= Since (film) =

1966 unfinished film directed by Andy Warhol

- Directed by: Andy Warhol
- Produced by: Andy Warhol
- Starring: Ondine; Mary Woronov; Gerard Malanga; Ronnie Cutrone; Ingrid Superstar; International Velvet; Richard Rheem
- Distributed by: The Factory
- Release date: 1966
- Running time: 67 minutes
- Country: United States
- Language: English

Since (also known as Kennedy's Assassination) is a 1966 film directed by Andy Warhol about the assassination of the President of the United States, John F. Kennedy. The film reconstructs the assassination with both Kennedy and Lyndon B. Johnson present, both before and after the event. The roles in Since are performed by Warhol's "superstars" from The Factory.

The film is based on the media coverage of the assassination and the speeches of Johnson, who succeeded Kennedy as President of the United States. The film is 67 minutes long, and shot on 16 mm film in color. It has been described as unfinished.

== Background ==
Warhol had been unmoved by the Kennedy assassination, commenting that he wasn't bothered that he was dead, but was bothered by "...the way the television and radio were programming everybody to feel so sad. It seemed like no matter how hard you tried, you couldn't get away from the thing." Warhol had already created the silkscreen paintings Sixteen Jackies, Nine Jackies, Jackie (The Week That Was) and Gold Jackie of Jacqueline Kennedy, and explored the reporting of the assassination in a series of eleven prints, Flash - November 22, 1963.

== Plot ==
The film begins with a close up of Ondine, with an off-screen voice saying that the film will follow the "Oswald model on television". The voice adds that "First it happened, then it was played back in tape, and then it was played back in slow motion." The voice also says that the performers don't have to maintain "stiff character portrayals" and are free to assume other roles, assuming they have "assumed that role by choice originally."

The voice says that the setting of the film is not in Dallas, a fact immediately contradicted by Ondine, playing Lyndon Johnson. Ondine indicates that Ingrid Superstar is Jacqueline Kennedy, after initially assuming that he himself was President Kennedy in confusion. Ondine announces his intention to hire assassins, and Gerard Malanga and Ronnie Cutrone appear as assassins. In planning the assassination Ondine fails to remember the street on which it occurred, before saying that "I don't know, I didn't even see it." Playing Kennedy, Mary Woronov waves a large sheet of red paper, indicating that she has been shot. Malanga then shoots Woronov with a banana, causing Ondine to exclaim that he was "a little late". Ondine then reads a speech to the American people.

The assassination is then restaged, with Malanga shooting Woronov, and the camera zooming in on the red paper blood. Ingrid Superstar asks "Who got shot?" before playing with Richard Rheem's hair. Susan Bottomly, playing Jacqueline Kennedy, leaps over a couch, which acts as the car in the Presidential motorcade. Bottomly is asked to leap again in slow motion, and the sound cuts out. Ronnie Cutrone then shoots Woronov, in pretend slow motion, the camera again focuses on the crumpled paper blood. Ondine tells Ingrid Superstar to be Lady Bird Johnson, the new First Lady of the United States, and is annoyed that she is not taking her role seriously. The War on Poverty is mentioned, and Superstar says that "We should omit poverty and paranoia."

A man wearing a red shirt then portrays President Kennedy, and lies in a pool of blood. The TV show You Are There is referenced, and after someone mentions that they are on their way to the hospital, Ondine says of Kennedy that "He's dead".

Cutrone, eating a banana, and Malanga, are taken by Secret Service agents through a passageway, and Malanga is shot. They are told to do it again as it wasn't a traumatic situation, and wouldn't "shock the world for four days". Cutrone then portrays Lee Harvey Oswald, and Malanga, playing Jack Ruby, shoots him with a banana. The shooting is then restaged, Cutrone falls to his knees with reporters trying to interview him. Ruby is taken away. Cutrone smokes a cigarette, and a voice announces that this is the "slow motion version", but the "regular rapid-motion version" will have to be done." An inflatable Baby Ruth chocolate bar then appears.

The participants in Since wave to the camera at the start of the second reel of film. Ondine says "There's Neiman Marcus", to which Susan Bottomly, playing Jacqueline Kennedy says "Oh, Hi". While the participants in the Presidential motorcade are discussing whether to have the top of the car down, Kennedy is shot by Oswald, and the camera zooms in and out on the crumpled red paper, and finally focuses on Ivy Nicholson's red stockings. Ondine then compliments Bottomly, calling her the "loveliest first lady we've ever had, outside of Abigail van Buren", and then an inflatable Baby Ruth bar is delivered as a message. The camera then quickly moves around while it is explained that President Kennedy has been shot. Ondine complains that the other characters are "absolutely boring", but praises Woronov claiming she "may have been the most interesting person here." Ondine then addresses the other participants, telling them to "keep attention away from Jack" and "play a kind of vague scene". Ondine then insults others and shouts "What the hell is the matter with you people?." Ondine then argues with Nicholson, but Malanga and Cutrone rush on and drop two inflatable Baby Ruth bars on the performers.

The camera then blurs and Malanga and Cutrone reappear and beat the participants with the Baby Ruth bars. A voice announces that Oswald is being transferred from prison, and Malanga and Cutrone are shown with whips. Malanga and Cutrone congratulate Ondine on becoming president, and then Malanga as Jack Ruby shoots Cutone playing Oswald. A press conference is enacted, and Ondine imitates Edward R. Murrow to say thank you and good night. Malanga walks around the set cracking his whip, and then asks Ondine if he has "anything to get high with". The film ends after Cutrone kicks the inflatable Baby Ruth bar in the air several times.

== Cast ==
- Ondine - Lyndon B. Johnson
- Ingrid Superstar - Jacqueline Kennedy/Lady Bird Johnson
- International Velvet - Jacqueline Kennedy
- Mary Woronov - John F. Kennedy
- Richard Rheem - John Connally
- Gerard Malanga, Ronnie Cutrone - alternating the roles of Lee Harvey Oswald/Jack Ruby
- Ivy Nicolson
- Randy Bourscheidt
- Walter Dainwood
- Henry Geldzahler

== Reception ==
J. J. Murphy, in his 2012 book The Black Hole of the Camera: The Films of Andy Warhol, wrote that Since "seems so heavily reliant on improvisation that at times it loses any clear sense of direction", and added that the film was quite "comedic". Murphy added that the participants in the film appeared to be "confused about events". Murphy says that Since shows the inability of a theatrical event to hold people's interest as it cannot deploy the same techniques that television does. Murphy concludes his analysis by saying that Warhol's restaging of the assassination was not as a historical event but thanks to television, as the "media spectacle it truly was."

== See also ==
- Assassination of John F. Kennedy in popular culture
- List of American films of 1966
- Andy Warhol filmography
