= Gerard Malanga =

American poet, photographer, filmmaker, actor, curator and archivist

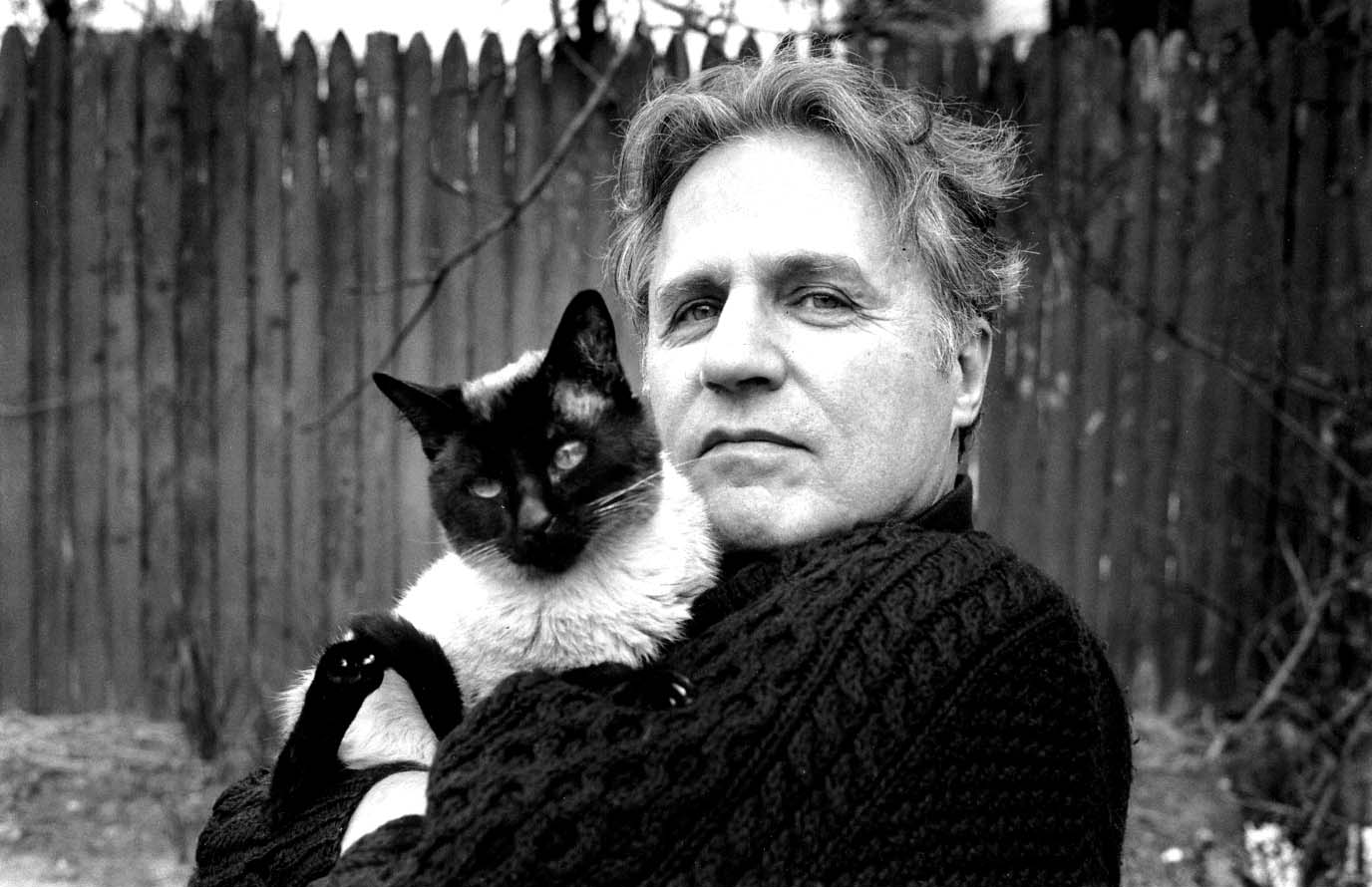
- Malanga in 2005
- Born: Gerard Joseph Malanga; March 20, 1943 (age 83); New York City, New York, U.S.
- Education: University of Cincinnati; Wagner College
- Occupations: Poet; photographer; filmmaker; actor; curator and archivist
- Years active: 1962–present
- Website: gerardmalangaofficial.com

Gerard Joseph Malanga (born March 20, 1943) is an American poet, photographer, filmmaker, actor, curator, and archivist. He is best known for his work with Pop artist Andy Warhol at the Factory from 1963 to 1970. The New York Times described him as "Andy Warhol's most important associate."

Initially employed as Warhol's studio assistant, Malanga helped produce his silkscreen paintings and later became a founding editor of Warhol's Interview magazine. As a Warhol superstar, he also appeared in several underground films, including Soap Opera (1964), Vinyl (1965), and Chelsea Girls (1966).

Malanga is also a prolific photographer whose work spans over four decades and includes portraits, nudes, and the urban documentation of "New York's Changing Scene." Malanga, who is primarily a poet, considered his portraits to be "poetry on film." He has directed several films and written books. In 2024, Malanga was elected as a Chevalier of the Ordre des Arts et des Lettres by the French Ministry of Culture.

== Early life and education ==
Malanga was born on March 20, 1943, in the Bronx, a borough of New York City, and raised on Fordham Road. He was the only child of Italian immigrant parents. His father, Gerardo Malanga, was a dry goods salesman. His early drawing ability was supported by his parents, who signed him up for an after-school art program.

In 1959, Malanga became a regular on Alan Freed's The Big Beat, televised on Channel 5 (WNEW) in New York City.

By his senior year, Malanga was interested in becoming a poet, but he was also studying graphic design and advertising at the School of Industrial Art in Manhattan. In 1960, he graduated from high school with a major in Advertising Design. After graduating, Malanga enrolled at the University of Cincinnati's' College of Art & Design but flunked out within a year. He subsequently met Wagner College professor Willard Maas, whose Brooklyn Heights apartment served as a literary salon. Impressed by Malanga's poetry, Maas encouraged him to restart his studies at Wagner College on Staten Island and, in 1961, secured him a fellowship on the condition that he maintain top grades.

At Wagner, Malanga became part of a writing community. He befriended one of his English professors, Willard Maas, and his wife Marie Menken, who became his mentors. He also made friends with Saul Bellow and Robert Lowell. He attended a symposium with Kay Boyle, Frank O'Hara, LeRoi Jones, and Kenneth Koch. Malanga won the first Gotham Book Mart Avant-Garde Poetry Prize. He was also an editor for the journal Wagner Literary Magazine.

== Career ==
=== Andy Warhol and the Factory ===
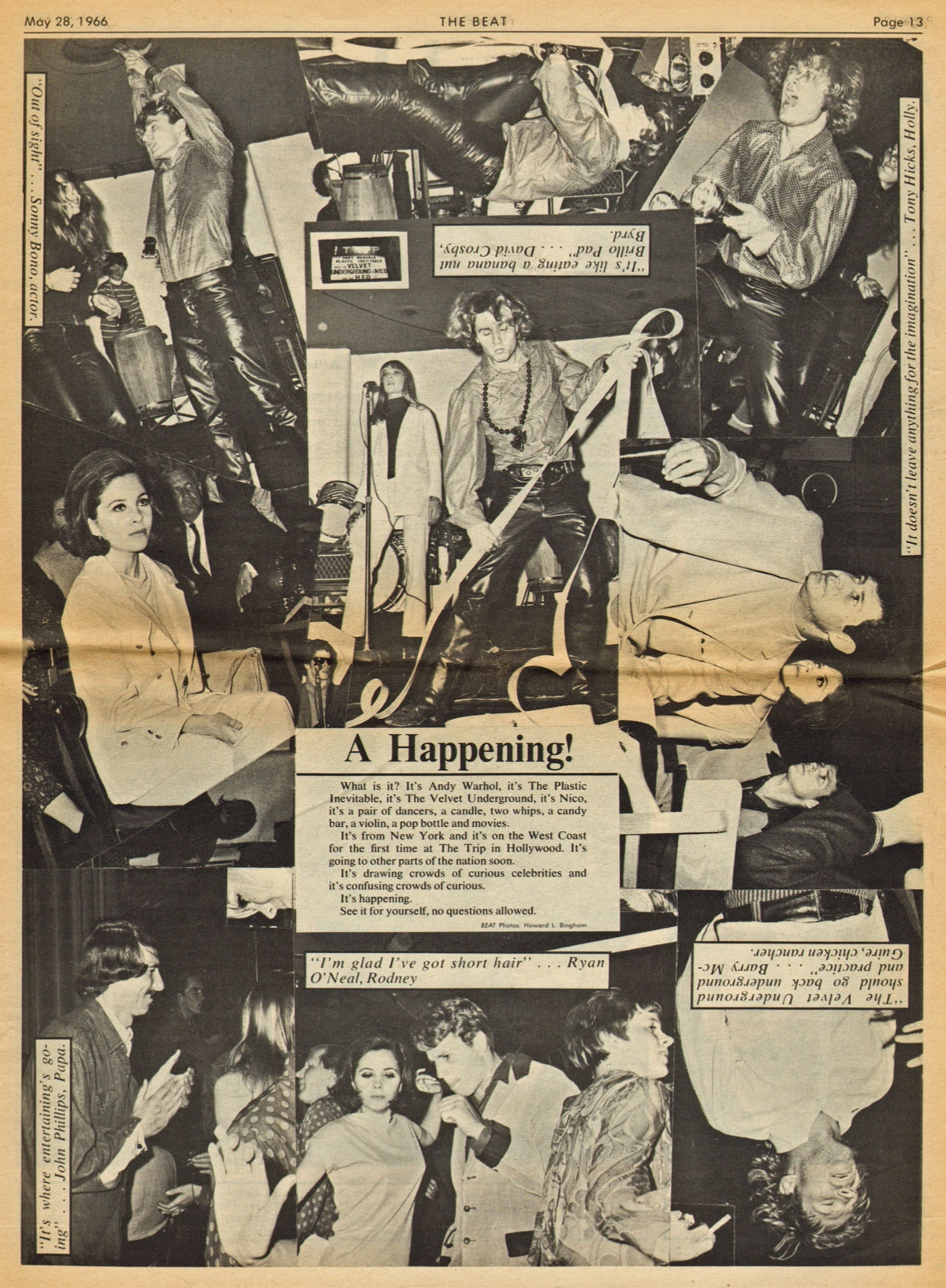
Gerard Malanga featured with the Velvet Underground in the May 28, 1966, issue of KRLA Beat

In 1963, Malanga was looking for a summer job when poet Charles Henri Ford introduced him to Pop artist Andy Warhol. Malanga had previously silkscreened fabrics for a necktie designer, and Warhol needed assistance with silkscreening. He was immediately hired by Warhol at $1.25 per hour. "The first was the Elizabeth Taylor portrait. Ethel Scull 36 Times, Elvis Presley, Death and Disasters—we put out a lot of stuff, just the two of us," Malanga recalled. In September, Malanga accompanied Warhol on a cross-country drive to California along with Wynn Chamberlain and Taylor Mead for Warhol's solo exhibition at the Ferus Gallery in Los Angeles. He never returned to Wagner College. "That summer job lasted seven years," he said.

Malanga was also involved in Warhol's filmmaking at the Factory. He appeared in films such as Kiss (1964), Harlot (1964), Soap Opera (1964), Couch (1964), Vinyl (1965), and Camp (1965). He played a combination of Lee Harvey Oswald and Jack Ruby in Warhol's film Since (1966).

Malanga dated model and debutante Susan Bottomly in 1966. After introducing her to Warhol, she was given the new moniker International Velvet. Malanga and Bottomly costarred in the film Chelsea Girls (1966).

In 1966, Malanga choreographed a dance for Warhol's multimedia presentation, The Exploding Plastic Inevitable, featuring musical performances by the Velvet Underground and Nico. During this period, Malanga was romantically involved with Italian model Benedetta Barzini. He wrote several poems about her and made a film about her.

Malanga frequented Max's Kansas City along with the rest of the Factory circle and later recalled, "Eric Emerson and I were very close. I was probably in for a close second with the most sexual encounters at Max's. We obviously did share a few....We were both involved with Elda Branch. Elda and I were in love with each other before she got involved with Eric."

Malanga and Warhol collaborated on the nearly 500 individual 3-minute Screen Tests, which resulted in a selection for a book of the same name, published by Kulchur Press, in 1967. He co-produced Bufferin (1967), in which he reads his poetry and diaries. It is deemed to be the longest spoken-word movie on record at 33-minutes nonstop.

In 1967, Malanga traveled to Italy to screen his film In Search of the Miraculous at the Bergamo Film Festival. While visiting friends in Rome, he ran out of money and reached out to Warhol for financial assistance. When Warhol did not respond, Malanga decided to make another film instead. To finance the project, he forged a Warhol painting based on images of the corpse of Che Guevara, the recently deceased leader of the Cuban Revolution, and attempted to sell it as an authentic work. He wrote to Warhol explaining his plan and asking for his cooperation, but, receiving no reply, proceeded with the scheme and arranged an exhibition at Galleria La Tartaruga in February 1968. Malanga had a prospective buyer willing to pay $3,000. When gallerist Plinio De Martiis sought to confirm that the work could legally be sold, he contacted Warhol's New York dealer, Leo Castelli, who informed Warhol of the situation. Warhol claimed that the painting was authentic, apparently to protect Malanga from imprisonment, but told De Martiis that Malanga was not authorized to sell it because it belonged to Warhol's private collection.

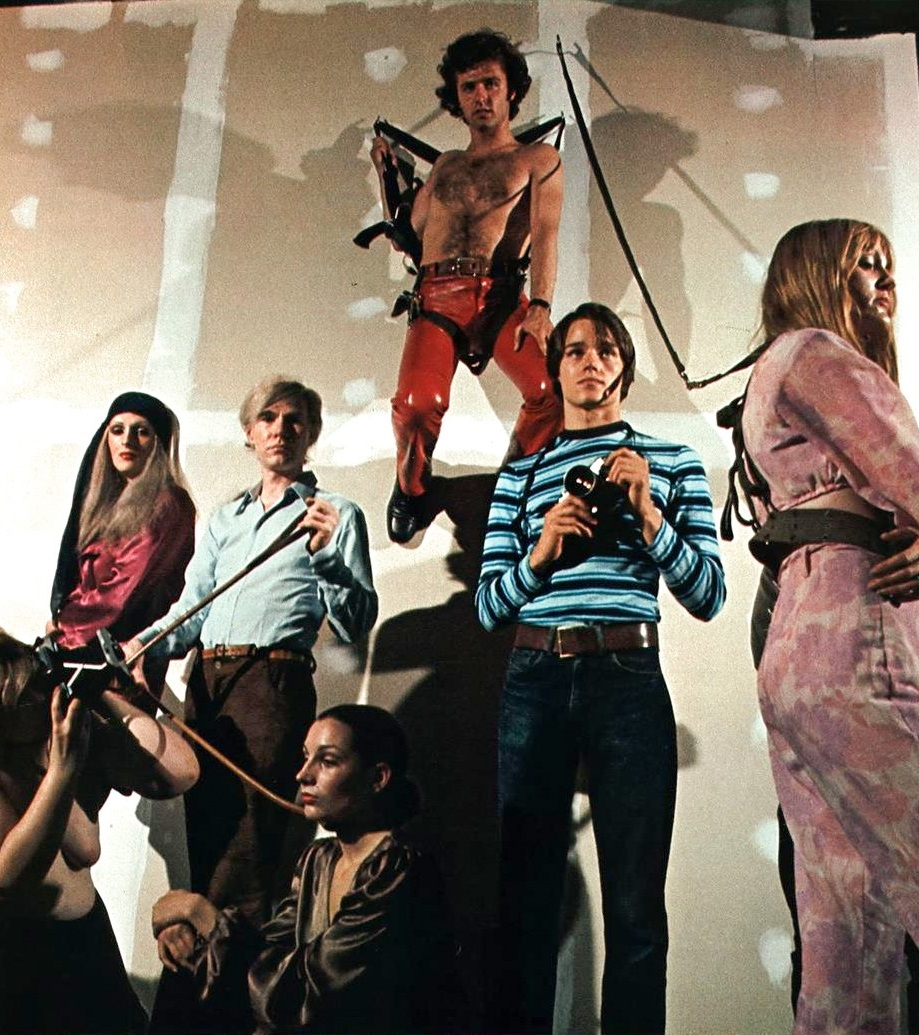
Malanga (hanging on the wall) with Andy Warhol and members of the Factory: Candy Darling, Brigid Berlin and Geraldine Smith on leashes held by Warhol, Jed Johnson holding a camera, and Ingrid Superstar leashed to the wall. Photo by Claude Picasso for Esquire, 1969

Upon returning to New York, Malanga apologized to Warhol for the forgeries and resumed work at the Factory after Warhol survived an assassination attempt in June 1968. During his absence, Warhol had asked his boyfriend Jed Johnson to take over as his assistant, but Johnson did not like the hands-on, messy work of silkscreening, prompting Warhol to call Malanga back. After completing a painting of Dominique T., Malanga shifted his focus to editing the College Rental Service for Warhol's films and managing bookings. In 1969, Malanga managed the "Andy Warhol Theater: Boys to Adore Galore" under his company, Poetry on Film. The theater showed male pornographic films for six weeks. He hired Jim Carroll to work in the box office and fellow Warhol superstar Joe Dallesandro as the projectionist. Later that year, Malanga became a founding editor of Warhol's Interview magazine, a role he kept until he left the Factory in 1970.

In the 1970s, more fake Warhol screen prints appeared in Europe, and Warhol suspected they were made by Malanga. Malanga denied that he had done them, but this created a strain in their relationship. In a December 1976 diary entry, Warhol said: "Ran into Gerard Malanga. Gerard wrote to Fred asking why he wouldn't let him do photography for Interview, I guess he just wants a press pass. Fred won't have anything to do with Gerard because we're still getting repercussions from all the fake Electric Chairs we think he did, they're being resold and resold and each time the money involved gets bigger, so Fred isn't about to give Gerard anything."

=== Poetry and photography career ===
By the time Malanga left Warhol's Factory to pursue photography in 1970, he had already written numerous poetry books. Malanga does not view photography as a substitute for poetry but as a complementary practice, describing his portraits as "poetry on film." He characterized poetry as an introspective, solitary act and photography as outward-facing and immediate; together, they formed his distinctive mode of self-expression. This relationship occasionally intersected in his writing, where poems reflect photographic processes, though his photographs themselves resist literary interpretation, with narrative reserved for poetry. Nearly all major poetry magazines published his work.

His career in photography began in 1969 when The Paris Review commissioned him to interview poet Charles Olson. As the magazine paired interviews with portraits, Malanga photographed Olson himself; the resulting image was widely acclaimed and marked the start of his photographic practice. Largely self-taught and working intuitively, he went on to build an extensive archive of portraits, photographing figures such as Mick Jagger, Iggy Pop, William Burroughs, Allen Ginsberg, Patti Smith, Duke Ellington, Jasper Johns, and Tennessee Williams.

In 1973, the University of Wisconsin–Parkside Library hosted a touring exhibition of 110 of his portraits. In 1975, Malanga presented a reading of his poetry and screened his film April Diary at the Sears Harkness Theater in Binghamton, New York.

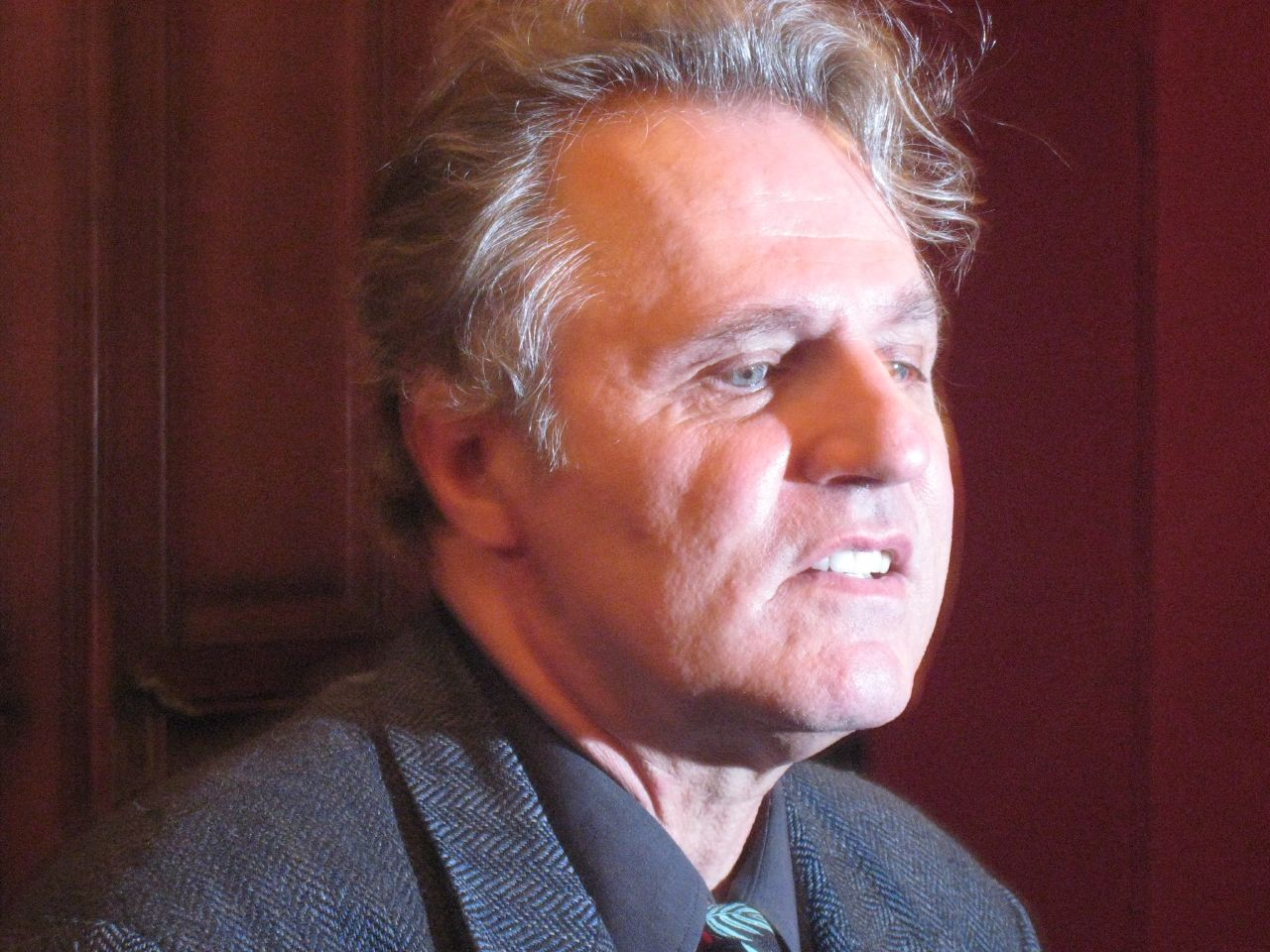
Malanga in 2007

In 1985, Henry J. Stern, Commissioner of the New York City Department of Parks & Recreation, appointed Malanga as the first photo archivist for the department. He was responsible for cataloguing and conserving the historic negative collection of Robert Moses.

In his introduction to Malanga's first monograph, Resistance to Memory (Arena Editions, 1998), Ben Maddow, a photo historian and poet, said, "Malanga has that great essential virtue of the photographer: humility before the complex splendor of the real thing...Malanga is the photo-historian of this culture."

In reviewing Malanga's book Screen Tests Portraits Nudes 1964-1996 (Steidl, 2000), photographer Fred W. McDarrah remarked that "Malanga is among the elite editors and photographers who have long dazzled and propelled the New York avant-garde."

In 2010, Malanga presented an exhibition titled Souls at the Pierre Menard Gallery in Cambridge, Massachusetts. Reflecting on the work, he said, "Each one has a story to tell: not just about the time we spent together while I was clicking away, but about themselves – they have revealed their souls and that's how I hit upon the idea to call the series, Souls."

In 2023, Malanga's photographs were the subject of an exhibition, Gerard Malanga // Moments in Time :: 1965–2023, at Beatie-Powers Place in Catskill, New York.

Malanga has also been active as a public speaker, appearing at universities, art centers, and museums to present his film Gerard Malanga's Film Notebooks and read from his latest poetry.

== Awards and honors ==
In 2024, Gerard was named a Chevalier of the Ordre des Arts et des Lettres by the French Ministry of Culture.

== Works ==
=== Poetry ===
- Screen Tests: A Diary (with Andy Warhol) (1967)
- The Last Benedetta Poems (1969)
- Gerard Malanga Selbsporträt eines Dichters (1970)
- 10 Poems for 10 Poets Black Sparrow Press (1970)
- chic death (1971)
- Wheels of Light (1972)
- Nine Poems for César Vallejo (1972)
- The Poetry of Night, Dawn and Dream/Nine Poems for César Vallejo (1972)
- Licht/Light (1973, bilingual)
- Incarnations: Poems 1965-1971 (1974)
- Rosebud (1975)
- Leaping Over Gravestones (1976)
- Ten Years After: The Selected Benedetta Poems (1977)
- 100 years have passed (1978)
- This Will Kill That (1983)
- Three Diamonds Black Sparrow Press (1991)
- Mythologies of the Heart, Black Sparrow Press (1996)
- No Respect: New & Selected Poems 1964-2000, Black Sparrow Press (2001)
- AM: Archives Malanga, Volumes 1, 2, 3 & 4 (2011)
- Three Broadside Poems, Bottle of Smoke Press (2013)
- Malanga Chasing Vallejo: Selected Poems: Cesar Vallejo: New Translations and Notes: Gerard Malanga. Three Rooms Press, Bilingual edition (2014)
- Tomboy & Other Tales, Bottle of Smoke Press (2014)
- Whisper Sweet Nothings & Other Poems, Bottle of Smoke Press (2017)
- Cool & Other Poems, Bottle of Smoke Press (2019)
- The New Melancholia & Other Poems, Bottle of Smoke Press (2021)
- Odie is Being Called Back & Other Poems, Bottle of Smoke Press (2024)

=== Editor ===
- The Brief Hidden Life of Angus MacLise
- The Collected Poetry of Piero Heliczer

=== Photography ===
- Six Portraits (1975)
- Portrait: Theory (With Robert Mapplethorpe, David Attie, and others) (1981)
- Autobiography of a Sex Thief (1985)
- Good Girls (1994)
- Seizing the Moment (1997)
- Resistance to Memory (1998)
- Screen Tests Portraits Nudes 1964-1996 (2000)
- Someone's Life (2008)
- Photobooths (Waverly Press, NYC, 2013)
- Ghostly Berms (Waverly Press, NYC, 2013)
- Julien Mérieau, Astonish me! / étonnez-moi! (Warm, 2016)
- The Beats Portfolio (Bottle of Smoke Press, 2018)
- The VU Box (Bottle of Smoke Press, 2021)
- 10 Musicians (Bottle of Smoke Press, 2025)

=== Photo and written biographies ===
- Long Day's Journey into the Past: Gunnar B. Kvaran speaks with Gerard Malanga (2008)
- Souls (2010)
- Gerard Malanga by Lars Movin (2011)

=== Films ===
- Academy Leader (1964)
- Andy Warhol: Portraits of the Artist as a Young Man (1965)
- Prelude to International Velvet Debutante (1966)
- Portrait of Giangiacomo Feltrinelli (1966). World premiere: Vienna International Film Festival, 2005.
- In Search of the Miraculous (1967)
- The Recording Zone Operator (1968, incomplete)
- The filmmaker records a portion of his life in the month of August (1968)
- Preraphaelite Dream (with music by Angus MacLise, 1968)
- The Children (AFI grant with music by Angus MacLise, 1969)
- April Diary (1970)
- Vision (incorporating Bufferin, 1976)
- Gerard Malanga's Film Notebooks, with music by Angus MacLise (2005).

=== Music ===
- THREE weeks WITH my DOG with 48 Cameras (1999)
- Angus MacLise, The Cloud Doctrine produced by Gerard Malanga (w/ Guy Marc Hinant), 2003.
