= Chelsea Girls =

1966 film by Paul Morrissey, Andy Warhol

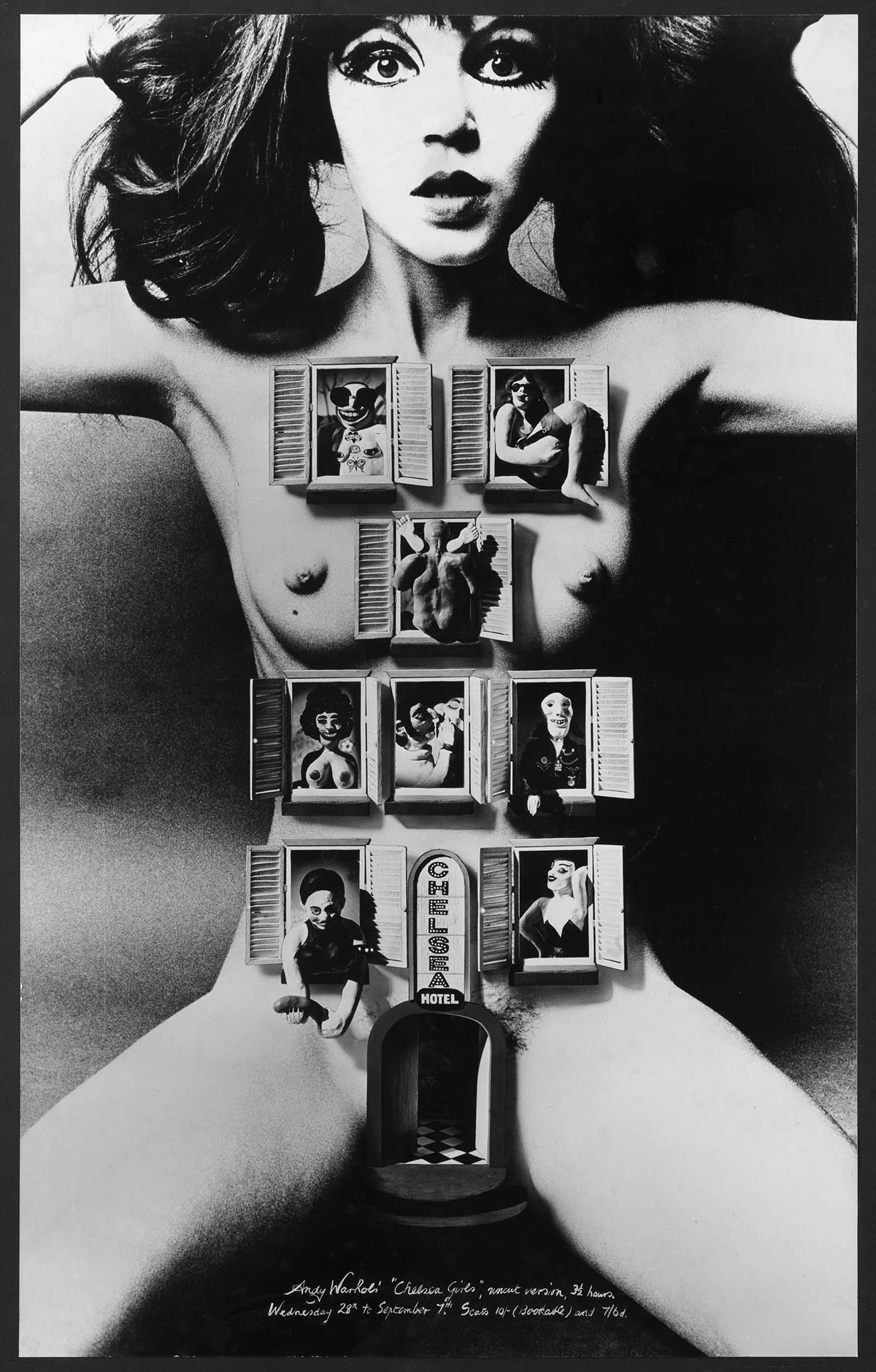
- Promotional Poster
- Directed by: Andy Warhol; Paul Morrissey
- Written by: Ronald Tavel; Andy Warhol
- Produced by: Andy Warhol
- Starring: Nico; Brigid Berlin; Ondine; Gerard Malanga; Eric Emerson; Mary Woronov; Mario Montez; Ingrid Superstar; International Velvet
- Cinematography: Andy Warhol; Paul Morrissey (uncredited)
- Music by: The Velvet Underground
- Distributed by: Filmmakers Distribution Center
- Release date: September 15, 1966
- Running time: 210 minutes (approx.)
- Country: United States
- Language: English
- Budget: $1,500–$2,000
- Box office: $200,000

Chelsea Girls (originally released as The Chelsea Girls) is a 1966 American experimental underground film directed by Andy Warhol and Paul Morrissey. Noted for its split-screen presentation and alternating use of color and black-and-white footage, the film features a series of loosely connected vignettes centered on Warhol's "superstars", many of whom were filmed inside New York's Chelsea Hotel. Upon its release, Chelsea Girls became Warhol's first commercial success and is regarded as a landmark of underground cinema for its unconventional structure, improvisational performances, and voyeuristic style. The original cut runs at just over three hours long.

In 2024, the film was selected for preservation in the United States National Film Registry by the Library of Congress as being "culturally, historically, or aesthetically significant".

== Cast ==
The cast of the film is largely made up of persons playing themselves, and are credited as follows:

- Brigid Berlin as Herself / The Duchess
- Nico as Herself
- Ondine as Himself / Pope
- Ingrid Superstar as Herself
- Randy Bourscheidt as Himself
- Angelina 'Pepper' Davis as Herself
- Christian Aaron Boulogne as Himself
- Mary Woronov as Hanoi Hannah
- Ed Hood as Himself
- Ronna as Herself
- International Velvet as Herself
- Rona Page as Herself
- Rene Ricard as Himself
- Dorothy Dean as Herself
- Patrick Fleming as Himself
- Eric Emerson as Himself
- Donald Lyons as Himself
- Gerard Malanga as Son
- Marie Menken as Mother
- Arthur Loeb as Himself
- Mario Montez as Transvestite

== Production ==
=== Development ===
According to scriptwriter Ronald Tavel, Warhol first brought up the idea for the film in the back room of Max's Kansas City, Warhol's favorite nightspot, in 1966. Warhol superstars Nico, Edie Sedgwick, and International Velvet were all living in the Chelsea area. Warhol, newly returned from touring with the Velvet Underground, decided to make a film set there and titled it Chelsea Girls. He had no specific theme in mind and no real script—only the idea of filming "people doing different things". Warhol invested roughly $1,500 to the production, a sum at least three times greater than the typical budget for his underground films.

=== Shooting ===
The film was shot in the summer and early autumn of 1966, in various rooms and locations inside the Hotel Chelsea. Filming also took place at Warhol's studio, The Factory. Appearing in the film were many of Warhol's regulars, including Nico, Brigid Berlin, Gerard Malanga, Mary Woronov (as Hanoi Hannah), Ingrid Superstar, "International Velvet" and Eric Emerson. According to Burns's documentary, Warhol and his companions completed an average of one 33-minute segment per week.

Nico (left) and Ondine (right) in the final scene of Chelsea Girls. This "still" comes from the 2003 Italian DVD print of the film.

=== Editing ===
Once principal photography wrapped, Warhol and co-director Paul Morrissey selected the 12 most striking vignettes they had filmed, and then projected them, side-by-side, to create a visual juxtaposition, of both contrasting images and divergent content (the so-called "white" or light, and innocent aspects of life, against the "black" or darker, more disturbing aspects). As a result, the 6.5-hour running time was effectively cut in half, to 3 hours and 15 minutes. However, part of Warhol's concept for the film was that it would be unlike watching a regular movie, the two projectors could never achieve exact synchronization from viewing to viewing; therefore—despite specific instructions of where individual sequences would be played, during the running time, each viewing of the film would, in essence, be an entirely different experience.

Several of the sequences have gone on to attain a cult status, most notably the "Pope" sequence, featuring avant-garde actor and poet Robert Olivo, or Ondine as he called himself, as well as a segment featuring Mary Woronov titled "Hanoi Hannah", one of two portions of the film scripted specifically by Tavel.

Notably missing is a sequence Warhol shot with Edie Sedgwick which, according to Morrissey, Warhol excised from the final film at the insistence of Sedgwick, who claimed she was under contract to Bob Dylan's manager Albert Grossman at the time the film was made. Sedgwick's footage was used in the Warhol film Afternoon.

The film was the inspiration for star Nico's 1967 debut album, Chelsea Girl, which featured a ballad-like track titled "Chelsea Girls", which was written about the hotel and its inhabitants.

== Release ==
Chelsea Girls premiered at the Film-Makers' Cinémathèque on September 15, 1966, and became the first underground film to transition from the 200-seat venue, the local showcase for experimental cinema, to a conventional Midtown Manhattan art theater.

The film was advertised as The Chelsea Girls throughout its initial New York run: at the Film-Makers' Cinematheque, 125 West 41st Street, where it was held over a second week, and from December 1966 at the Cinema Rendezvous. Advertisements in The Village Voice were among the first to use the shortened title Chelsea Girls, in May 1967, when the film moved to the St. Mark's Cinema.

Warhol and his entourage attended the 1967 Cannes Film Festival to present the film, but it was not shown. "The festival authorities explained that the film was too long, there were technical problems, there was no time".

=== Poster ===
The poster for the film, featuring a nude photograph of model Clare Shenstone, was designed for its London release by graphic artist Alan Aldridge. Celebrated for its creativity and eroticism, the poster captures the sensual essence of the film. Warhol was reportedly very pleased with the design, commenting that he "wished the movie was as good as the poster". The image was later used as the cover art for English alternative rock band Felt's 1984 album The Splendour of Fear.

=== Certification ===
In the UK, Chelsea Girls was refused a theatrical certificate in 1967 by the British Board of Film Classification.

== Critical reception ==
Still from Chelsea Girls, featuring Mary Woronov in color photography on the left side, and black & white photography on the right.

Although the film garnered the most commercial success of Warhol's films, reaction to it was mixed. Filmmakers Jonas Mekas and Shirley Clarke hailed the film as a great motion-picture "break-through". Newsday reviewer Joseph Gelmis wrote:

That experiment, The Chelsea Girls, is a crude home movie that is gripping, boring, sick and remarkable, all at once. It has the raw power of a clinical documentary. Certainly this unedited record of Warhol's Beautiful People, or, if you will, the Whole Sick Crew, acting out their private rituals and fantasies for free can't be called a movie in any conventional sense. It might, it has been observed, been made at the workshops of Caligula or De Sade if those worthies had had a camera handy.

Film critic Bosley Crowther of The New York Times wrote that Chelsea Girls "is really nothing more than an extensive and pretentious entertainment for voyeurs ... Already some sympathetic critics have hailed it as a shattering tour de force that artfully reveals a composite of the Great Society. But this is absurdly overstating a documentation which, at best, shows the squalor of a few unfortunate people—and not very artfully at that". He concluded that Warhol’s aesthetic aims to saturate or hypnotize the viewer into an insensible state.

Variety wrote that the film was "a pointless, excruciatingly dull three-and-a-half hours spent in the company of Andy Warhol's friends".

Film critic Roger Ebert reviewed the film in June 1967, and had a negative response to it, granting it one star out of four. He stated: "What we have here is 3 1/2 hours of split-screen improvisation poorly photographed, hardly edited at all, employing perversion and sensation like chili sauce to disguise the aroma of the meal. Warhol has nothing to say and no technique to say it with. He simply wants to make movies, and he does: hours and hours of them".

=== Subsequent reviews ===
On Rotten Tomatoes the film has an approval rating of 50%, based on reviews from 10 critics.

Kenneth Baker of the San Francisco Chronicle reviewed the film in honor of its screening in the San Francisco Bay Area in 2002, and gave the film a positive review, stating: "The tyranny of the camera is the oppression The Chelsea Girls records and imposes. No wonder it still seems radical, despite all we have seen onscreen and off since 1966". Jonathan Rosenbaum also gave the film a positive review, stating that "the results are often spellbinding; the juxtaposition of two film images at once gives the spectator an unusual amount of freedom in what to concentrate on and what to make of these variously whacked-out performers". TV Guide reviewed the film in December 2006, granting it four stars, calling it "fascinating, provocative, and hilarious" and "a film whose importance as a 1960s cultural statement outweighs any intrinsic value it may have as a film".

In 2024, the film was selected for preservation in the United States National Film Registry by the Library of Congress as being "culturally, historically, or aesthetically significant".

== Availability ==
=== Home media ===
Chelsea Girls is largely unavailable for home video format. The film belongs to the Andy Warhol Foundation, and it, along with Warhol's other films (apart from a handful of his Screen Tests, which have since been released on DVD), have never seen home video releases in the United States. In Europe, however, a handful of Warhol's films were released on DVD, including a short-lived DVD print of Chelsea Girls which was available in Italy for some time. This Italian DVD print, which is the film's only official home video release, was released on September 16, 2003.

=== Museum screenings ===
While the film is unavailable for personal purchase, it is often screened at art museums, and has been shown at The Museum of Modern Art (which owns a rare print of the film reels) as well as The Andy Warhol Museum in Pittsburgh, Pennsylvania. The film was screened in San Francisco for the first time in nearly 20 years at Castro Theatre in April 2002. Screenings were held in 2010 at the Seattle Art Museum and at the Varsity Theater in Chapel Hill, North Carolina, in 2011 at the High Museum of Art in Atlanta, Georgia, and the Block Museum of Art in Evanston, Illinois in 2016. The full 3 1/2 hour version of the film was screened at the Brooklyn Museum in a custom built theatre within their edition of the Andy Warhol: Revelation exhibit from November 19, 2021 to June 19, 2022.

== See also ==
- Andy Warhol filmography
- Reality films
- Arthouse cinema
- Eileen Myles
