= Susan Bottomly =

American model and actress (born 1948)

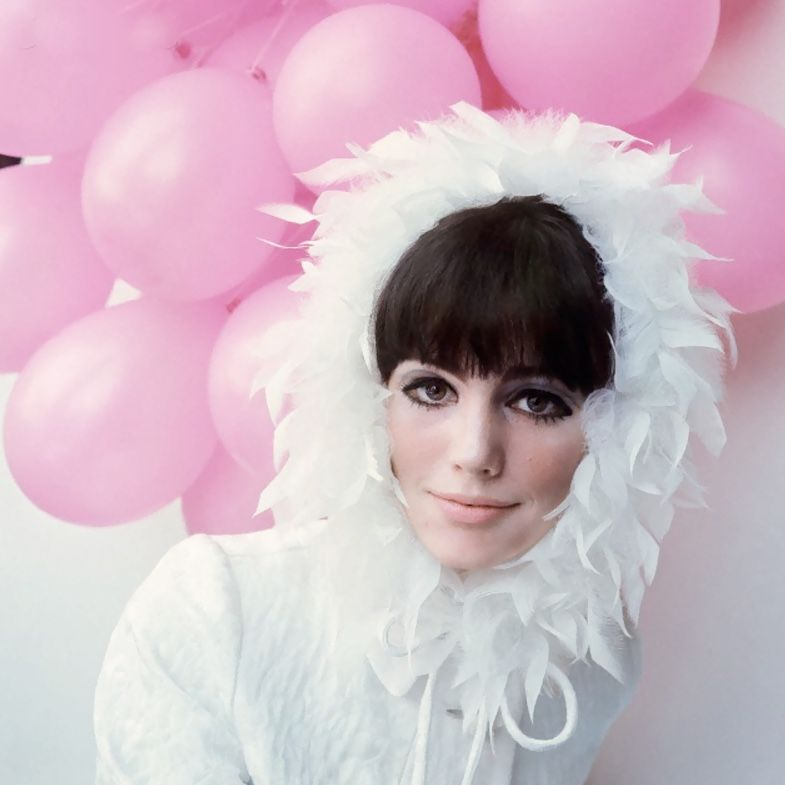
- Bottomly by David McCabe in 1965
- Born: October 1, 1948 (age 78); Boston, Massachusetts, U.S.
- Other names: International Velvet; Susan Kent
- Occupations: Actress, model
- Spouse: Tony Kent (divorced)

Susan Dunn Whittier Bottomly (born October 1, 1948), also known as International Velvet, is a former American model and actress. She is best known for her association with Pop artist Andy Warhol and the Factory scene of the 1960s.

Bottomly began her career as a fashion model and appeared on the cover of Mademoiselle in 1965. She moved to New York the following year and became one of Warhol's "superstars," adopting the name International Velvet. She starred in several of Warhol's underground films, including Chelsea Girls (1966), Paraphernalia (1966), Since (1966), Superboy (1966), and **** (Four Stars) (1967). She continued working as a model during the 1970s, appearing frequently in European editions of Vogue Paris, Vogue Italia, and Elle. In the 1980s, Bottomly operated a modeling agency in Salt Lake City.

== Life and career ==
=== Early life and education ===
Susan Bottomly came from an old New England family. Her father John S. Bottomly was a former assistant attorney general of Massachusetts who prosecuted the Boston Strangler.

Bottomly was a willful child who went to boarding schools. She was thrown out of school four times. She attended Milton Academy in Milton, Massachusetts.

At the age of sixteen, Bottomly began modeling with Ford Modeling Agency. She appeared on the cover of Mademoiselle magazine in December 1965, shot by British fashion photographer David McCabe.

In 1966, Bottomly graduated from Hannah More Academy boarding school in Reisterstown, Maryland. As a debutante, Bottomly represented Wellesley at the Bachelor's Ball held at the Statler Hilton in Boston in June 1966.

=== Andy Warhol and the Factory ===
In 1966, Bottomly met poet and filmmaker Gerard Malanga at a party for poet Rene Ricard in Boston. Malanga was instantly smitten and made Prelude to International Velvet Debutante, a home-made short film. "I was conscious of making the first film of Susan Bottomly, and in a sense I was making my own superstar discovery … So that when I returned to New York, I could say, 'She's already appeared in one movie. And it's my movie," said Malanga. Bottomly returned to New York with Malanga and they resided in a room paid for by her parents at the Chelsea Hotel.

Malanga had been pop artist Andy Warhol's studio assistant and eagerly introduced him to Bottomly. Warhol invited her to join his Factory as a Warhol superstar, "I had so much affection for Andy. He wasn’t a big talker, but he had a certain, extraordinary charisma that gave you a kind of permission and license to be freer than I’d even been able to be," said Bottomly.

In his book POPism: The Warhol '60s (1980), Warhol recalled, "There were other girls who were just as beautiful as Susan Bottomly was, but her way of moving made her extra beautiful." Fascinated by her makeup routine, he remarked, "Watching someone like Susan Bottomly, who had such perfect, full, fine features, doing all this on her face was like watching a beautiful statue painting itself."

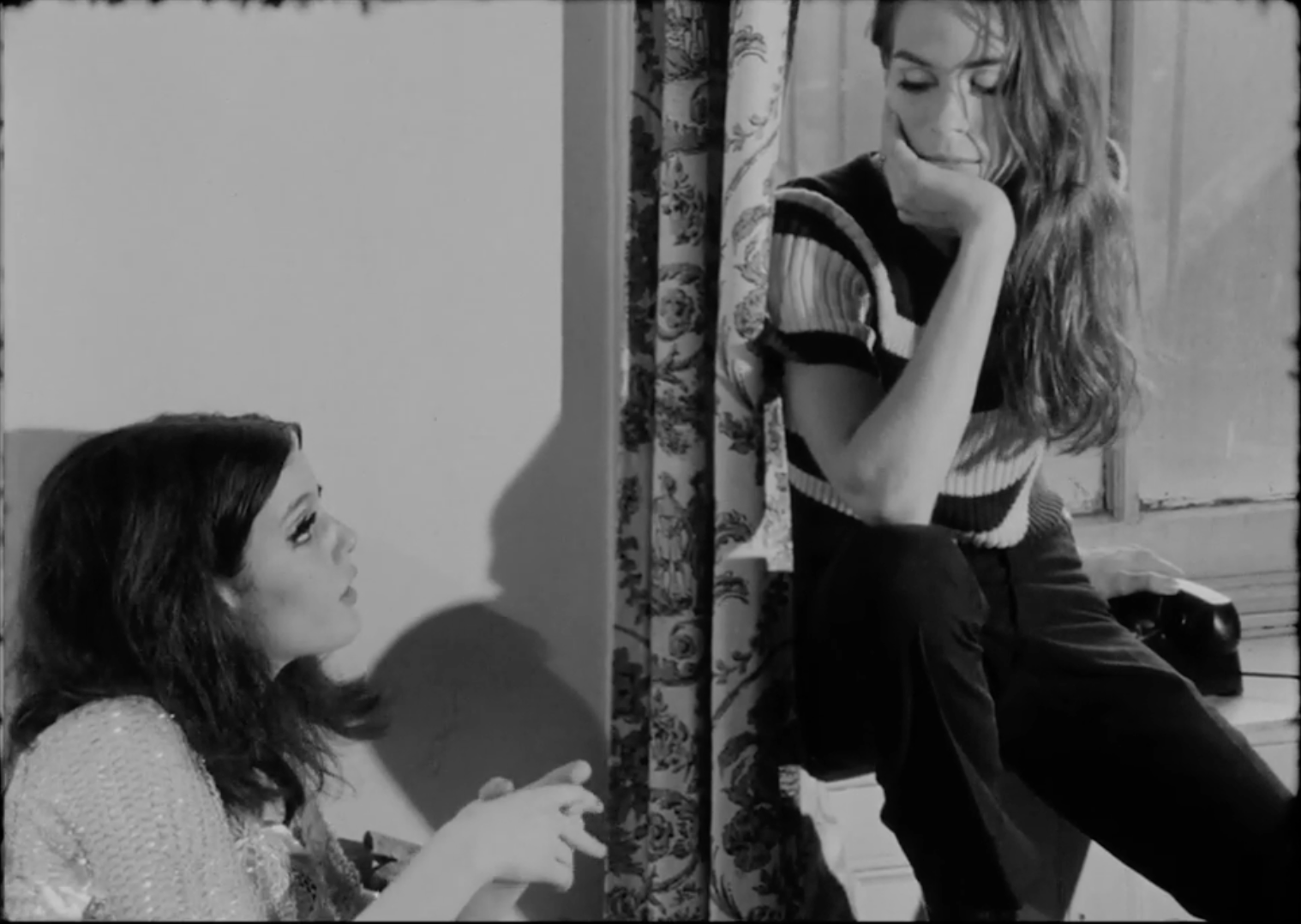
Bottomly and Mary Woronov in a still from Chelsea Girls (1966).

Bottomly quickly became the group's breakthrough star, and despite being Edie Sedgwick's successor, there was no animosity between them. "Edie was very gracious and sweet, very friendly to me. She was the queen bee when I arrived at the Factory," said Bottomly. Bottomly began using the name International Velvet, which derived from her nickname "Black Beauty," after her hair.

Bottomly appeared in three segments of Warhol's three-hour split screen film Chelsea Girls (1966). In the segment Hanoi Hannah, she converses with Mary Woronov and Ingrid Superstar in her room at the Chelsea Hotel. The scene contrasts Bottomly's passive demeanor with Woronov's aggressive character. Before filming, Bottomly told Warhol and that she was expecting a phone call from a major modeling agency and would need to answer it. When the phone call arrived, Woronov snatched it from her and insulted her, prompting Bottomly to run from the set in tears. She later returned to finish the scene.

This scene led to much speculation on the relationship between Bottomly and Woronov. In her book, Woronov said, "Velvet was a slob; a girl slob, messy but sexy like underwear and perfume … was a society girl from Boston hoping to follow in Edie Sedgwick's footsteps, footsteps that seemed to lead straight to the rubber room so far as I could see, but that was her problem; I was more than willing to be the first step in putting her there. She was mine, my victim, according to the script which was a very S&M setup, with me in the S part."

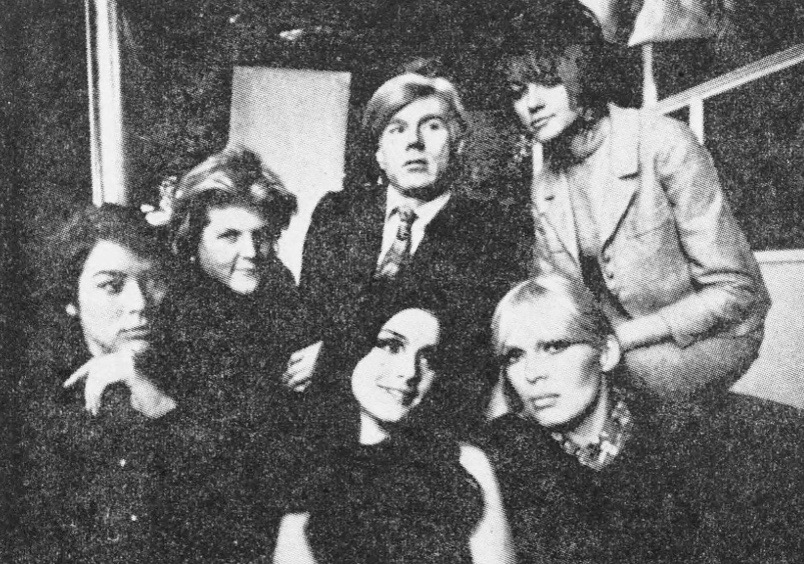
Woronov, Brigid Polk, Bottomly (center), Warhol, Nico, and Ingrid Superstar by Robert R. McElroy for Newsweek, 1967

She went on to star in several Factory films in 1966, including Susan-Space, Superboy, The Bob Dylan Story, Paraphernalia, and The Velvet Underground: Tarot Cards. She also sat for one of Warhol's Screen Tests. During this time, Warhol was the manager of the Velvet Underground, an avant-garde rock band. Bottomly became involved with Velvet Underground members Lou Reed and John Cale, causing more conflict in the group, which was already disintegrating.

By the fall of 1966, Bottomly was dating jewlery designer David Croland, who she met during a party at the Paraphernalia boutique in New York. Croland designed large statement earrings, which Bottomly became known for. Bottomly and Croland accompanied Warhol to parties and gallery openings, bringing attention to their bold style. In January 1967, Women's Wear Daily columnist Carol Bjorkman included Bottomly among the "New Breed," a younger generation challenging conventional social norms and embracing rock music and counterculture.

Bottomly was represented by the Paul Wagner modeling agency. She appeared in Vogue, Newsweek, and Town & Country. She was featured on the February 1967 cover of Esquire magazine, sitting in a trash can. That year, Bottomly did a screen test at Paramount for the lead role in the American remake of the British film Darling. She was also intended to star in Ciao! Manhattan, directed by former Factory associate Chuck Wein, but ultimately, she didn't sign on to the production and Edie Sedgwick played the lead character, Susan.

Bottomly attended the 1967 Cannes Film Festival with Warhol to screen Chelsea Girls, but the film was not shown because festival authorities said film was too long and there were technical problems. Bottomly and Croland had initially planned to stay France for two weeks but they ended up living in Paris for a year.

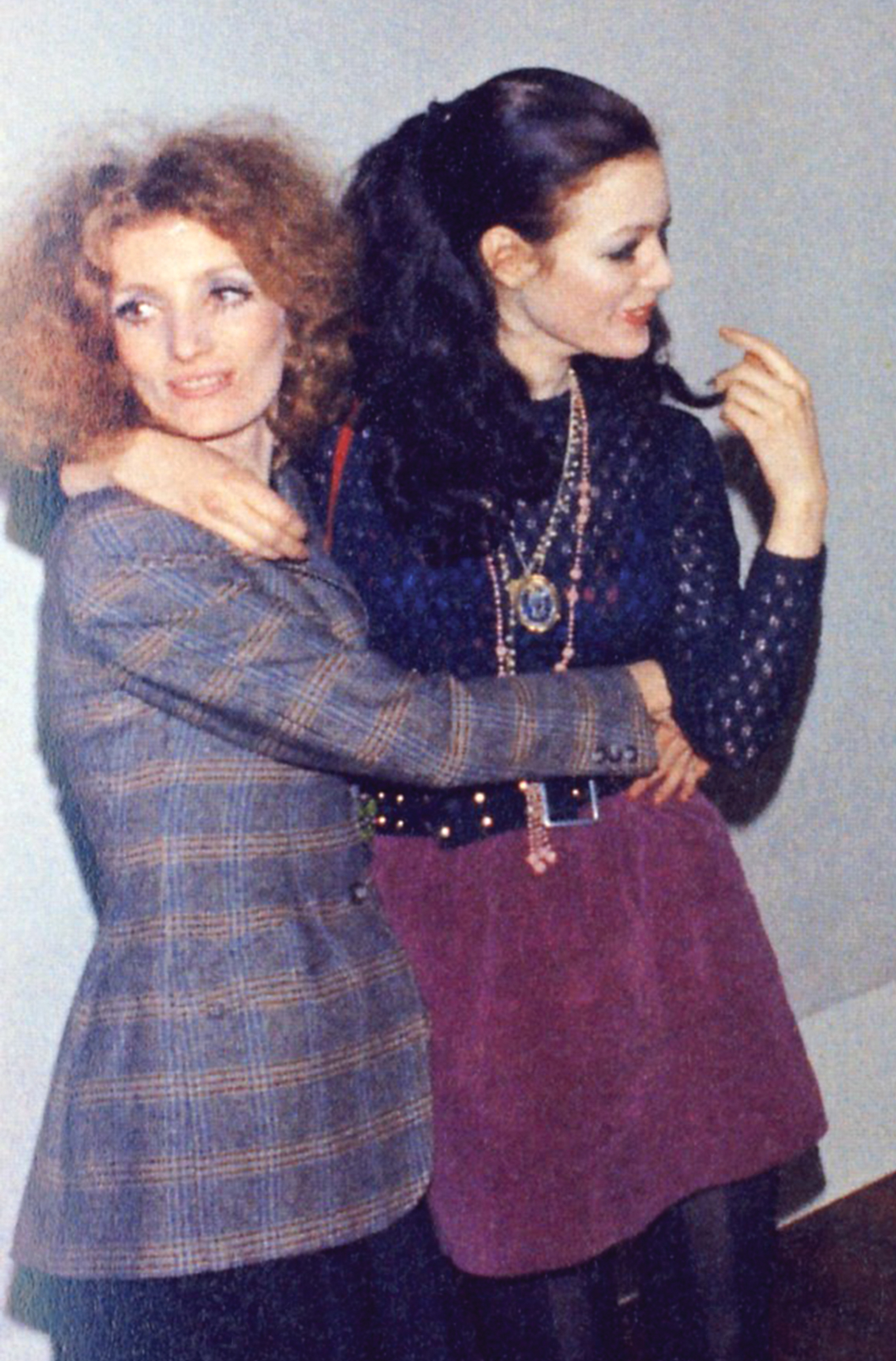
Viva and Bottomly by Billy Name at the Factory, 1968.

After Bottomly met French matinee star Christian Marquand, she and Croland split up in 1968. She was cast in a minor role in the film Candy (1968). In the film, she runs down a street shouting "Candy! Your forgot the shoe!" After filming, she was flown to Italy by Marquand to work with the Living Theatre, where she stayed for three months.

When Bottomly returned to New York, she appeared alongside other Factory members in John Schlesinger's Midnight Cowboy (1969), which was filmed after the attempted assassination of Warhol in 1968. Later that year, Bottomly left the Factory, explaining, "I remember having a few twangs about the fact that Viva was becoming more important than I was. On the other hand I knew it was time for me to move on, so it wasn’t a big deal to me," she recalled.

=== Later career ===
In 1969, Bottomly married Frederick Terry Krementz at her parents home in Wellesley, Massachusetts. As a fashion photographer Krementz went by the name Tony Kent. The couple moved to Paris and Bottomly changed her name to Susan Kent. She continued modeling in the 1970s, appearing most often in European magazines such as Vogue Paris, Vogue Italia, and Elle France. She was photographed by Francesco Scavullo for the August 1975 and October 1976 issues of Cosmopolitan magazine.

After her divorce, she operated Uno modeling agency in Salt Lake City, Utah in the 1980s.
