= Warhol superstars =

Figures associated with Andy Warhol in the 1960s–1970s

Warhol superstars were a group of personalities who appeared in American artist Andy Warhol's underground films and were associated with his studio, the Factory, during the 1960s and 1970s. They included actors, models, musicians, socialites, and performance artists who became prominent within the New York City avant-garde scene, with many gaining wider visibility through his films and publicity. The phenomenon developed alongside Warhol's experimental filmmaking and the counterculture of the 1960s. Some superstars established careers independently of Warhol, while others were associated with his circle only briefly or continued working with him for several years.

== History ==
When Pop artist Andy Warhol began making experimental films in 1963, his early works included "motionless" films such as Sleep (1964). He soon began producing underground films at a rapid pace, filming friends, artists, and other figures who frequented his studio, the Factory. Those who appeared regularly in his films and became associated with his social circle came to be known as Warhol superstars. The superstars helped generate publicity for Warhol's films, while Warhol offered them exposure and a degree of celebrity in return. Someone once asked Warhol his criteria for a superstar, and he replied, "It's anybody who talks a lot." He later explained, "I only wanted to find great people and let them be themselves and talk about what they usually talked about and I'd film them for a certain length of time and that would be the movie."

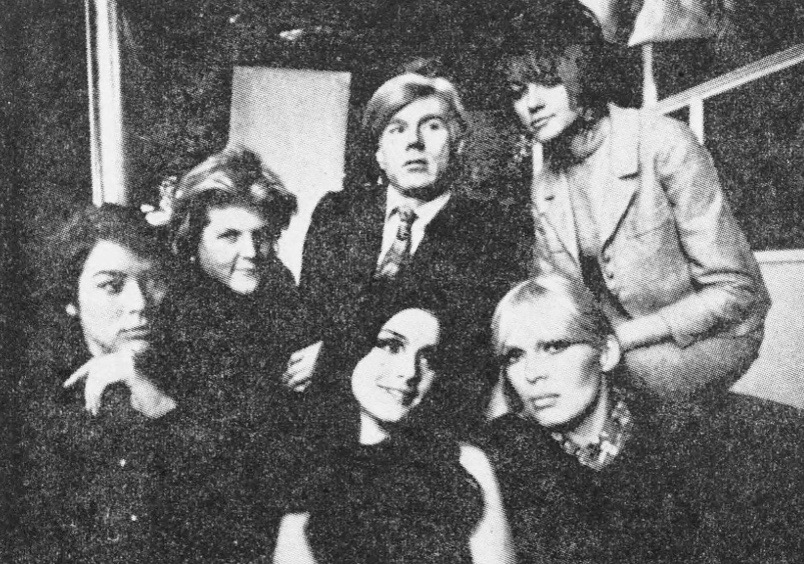
Andy Warhol with Mary Woronov, Brigid Polk, International Velvet, Nico, and Ingrid Superstar. Photo by Robert R. McElroy for Newsweek, 1967

As his filmmaking continued, he became increasingly interested in the bohemian eccentrics and unconventional personalities attracted to the studio. He also befriended socialites such as Baby Jane Holzer, who was the first figure associated with the superstar phenomenon and described by journalist Tom Wolfe as the "Girl of the Year" in 1964. "Andy calls everything super," said Holzer in 1964. "I'm a super star, he's a super-director, we make super epics—and I mean, it's a completely new and natural way of acting. You can't imagine what really beautiful things can happen!"

Other prominent figures associated with the first Factory, known as the "Silver Factory" because its walls were covered in foil and silver paint by Billy Name, included Gerard Malanga, Taylor Mead, Ondine, and Edie Sedgwick. They appeared in films such as Couch (1964), Soap Opera (1964), Camp (1965), and Vinyl (1965). In 1965, Vogue magazine anointed Sedgwick a "Youthquaker."

By 1966, Warhol had begun promoting a new group of superstars, including Ingrid Superstar, Nico, International Velvet, Mary Woronov, and Brigid Polk. The 1966 film Chelsea Girls, which depicted life among Warhol's circle at the Hotel Chelsea, became one of Warhol's most commercially successful works and helped bring his superstars and the Factory milieu to a wider audience beyond New York's underground art scene.

There were a number of Black superstars associated with Warhol during a period when racial discrimination remained widespread in the United States. Black performers who were part of Warhol's circle included Rufus Collins, Dorothy Dean, Pat Hartley, Donyale Luna, Abigail Rosen, and Carol LaBrie.

Warhol and his superstars were regulars at Max's Kansas City, a gathering place for artists, musicians, and other figures of the downtown cultural scene. The restaurant's back room became closely associated with Warhol and members of the Factory. Warhol exchanged artwork for credit with the restaurant's owner, Mickey Ruskin, and allowed members of his circle to use his charge account.

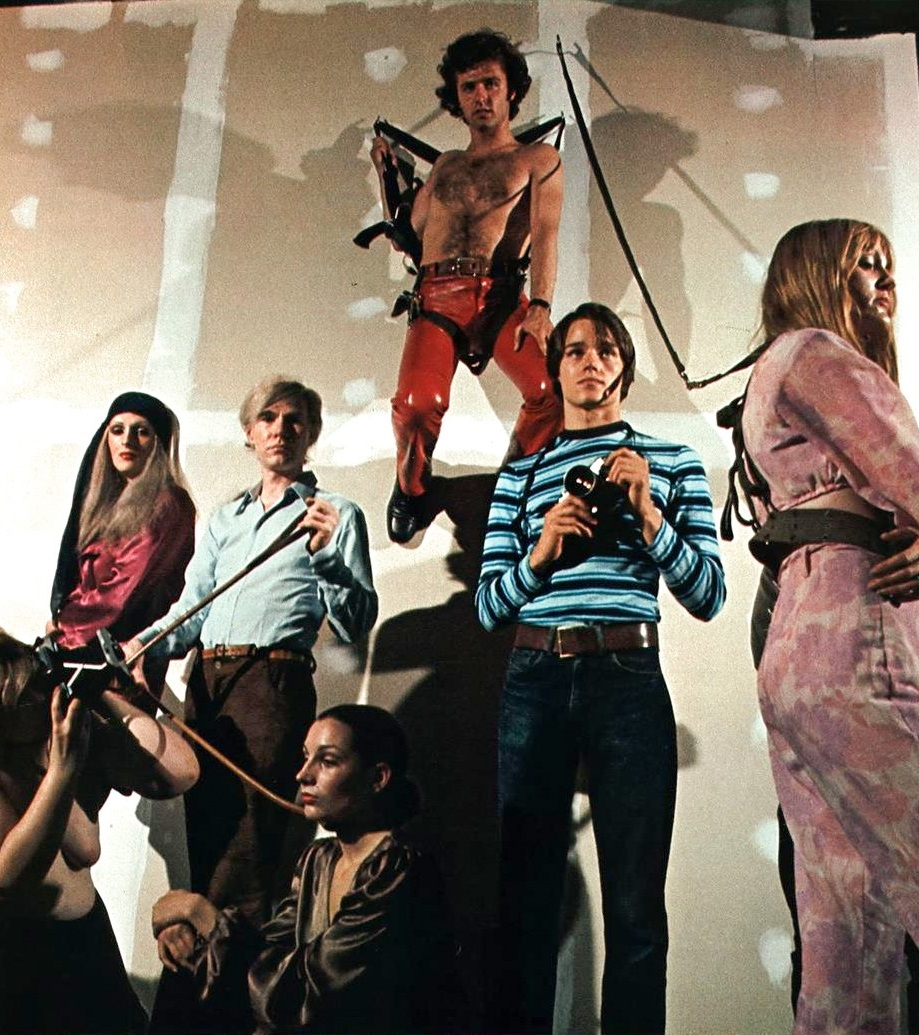
Warhol with Brigid Polk, Candy Darling, Geraldine Smith, Gerard Malanga, Jed Johnson, and Ingrid Superstar at the Factory. Photo by Claude Picasso for Esquire, 1969

In 1968, radical feminist Valerie Solanas, who had appeared in minor roles in Warhol's films I, a Man (1967) and Bike Boy (1967), attempted to assassinate Warhol at the Factory. While Warhol recovered in the hospital, several members of his circle appeared in John Schlesinger's Midnight Cowboy (1969), including Viva, Ultra Violet, Jed Johnson, Jay Johnson, International Velvet, Paul Morrissey, and Gerard Malanga. They appeared in a psychedelic party sequence inspired by the Factory.

Through his subsequent film collaborations with director Paul Morrissey, Warhol introduced a new coterie of superstars, including Joe Dallesandro, Candy Darling, Jackie Curtis, Holly Woodlawn, Jane Forth, and Donna Jordan. The Warhol–Morrissey films Flesh (1968), Trash (1970), Women in Revolt (1971), L'Amour (1972), and Heat (1972) featured many of these performers and further established the superstars as recognizable figures within the youth culture. Dallesandero in particular became a sex symbol of gay subculture. The New York Times proclaimed Forth the "New Now Face" in 1970.

In the 1970s, the Factory had increasingly become a business enterprise, with Warhol also publishing Interview magazine and seeking to establish himself in Hollywood. The Factory environment of this period has been compared to the Hollywood studio system at its height in the 1930s and 1940s. Former Interview editor Bob Colacello likened Warhol to film producer Louis B. Mayer, co-founder of Metro-Goldwyn-Mayer studios.

In 1971, Warhol staged his play Pork in New York and London. The productions featured performers including Tony Zanetta, Wayne County, Geri Miller, Cyrinda Foxe, and Cherry Vanilla, who became known as Warhol superstars.

The prominence of the Warhol superstars declined as Warhol increasingly returned his attention to painting. Warhol's last film Bad (1977) was directed by his boyfriend Jed Johnson and featuring several performers associated with his earlier films.

== List of Warhol superstars ==
- Abigail Rosen
- Allen Midgette
- Andrea Feldman
- Bibbe Hansen
- Billy Name
- Brigid Polk
- Candy Darling
- Carol LaBrie
- Cherry Vanilla
- Chuck Wein
- Cyrinda Foxe
- Donna Jordan
- Donyale Luna
- Dorothy Dean
- Ed Hood (My Hustler)
- Edie Sedgwick
- Elecktrah (Kitchen and The Life of Juanita Castro)
- Eric Emerson
- Fred Herko
- Genevieve Charbin (My Hustler)
- Geraldine Smith
- Gerard Malanga
- Geri Miller
- Holly Woodlawn
- Ingrid Superstar
- International Velvet
- Ivy Nicholson
- Jack Smith
- Jackie Curtis
- Jane Forth
- Jane Holzer
- Jay Johnson
- Jayne County
- Jed Johnson
- Joe Campbell
- Joe Dallesandro
- Louis Waldon
- Mario Montez
- Mary Woronov
- Max Delys
- Naomi Levine
- Nico
- Ondine
- Pat Ast
- Paul America
- Pat Hartley
- Penny Arcade
- Randall Bourscheidt
- Rolando Peña
- Ruby Lynn Reyner
- Rufus Collins (Kiss, Batman Dracula, Soap Opera, and Couch)
- Sally Kirkland
- Sylva Thinn
- Tally Brown
- Taylor Mead
- Tom Hompertz (Lonesome Cowboys and San Diego Surf)
- Tony Zanetta (Pork)
- Ultra Violet
- Viva

== Legacy ==
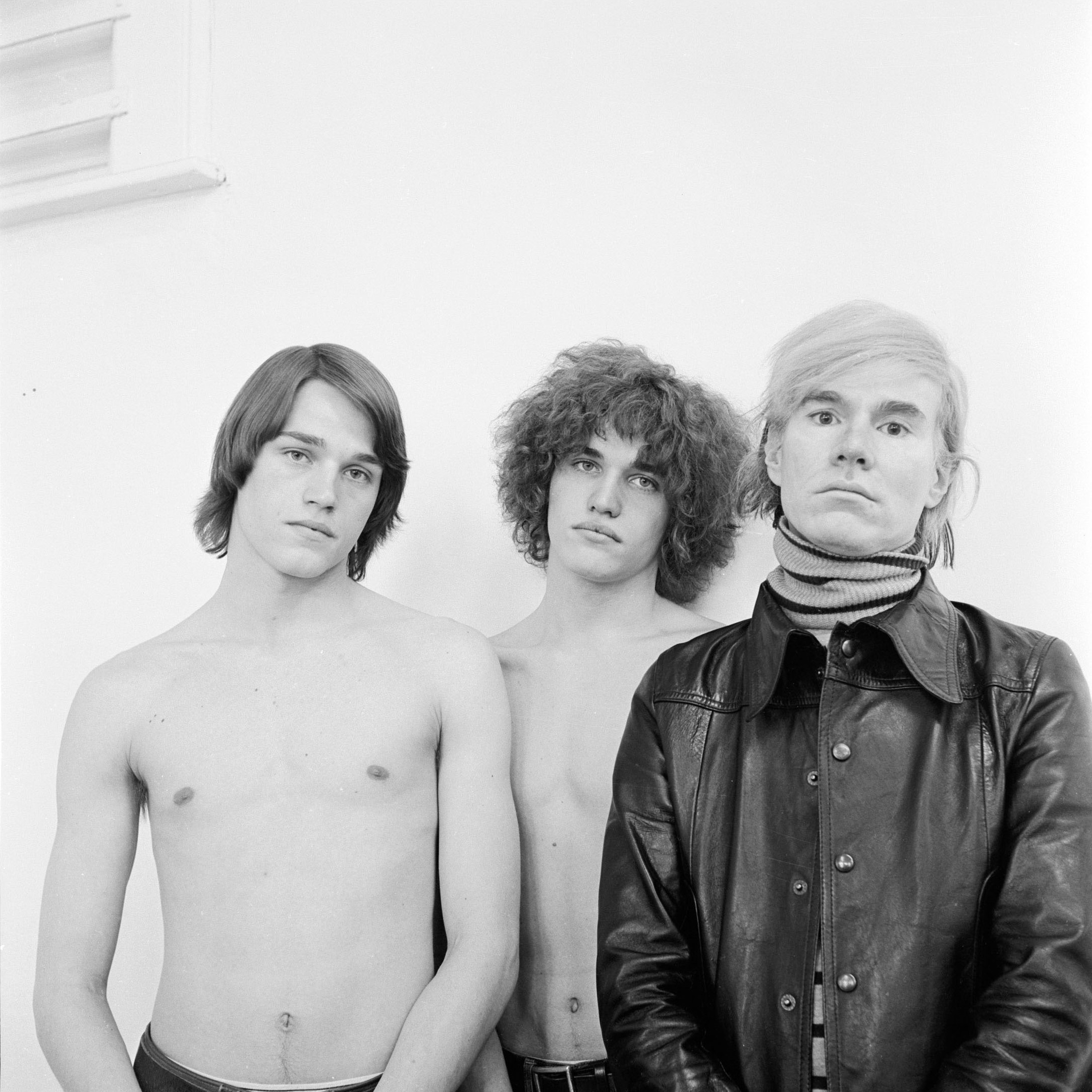
Warhol with twin brothers Jed and Jay Johnson at the Factory. Jed was Warhol's longtime partner. Photo by Cecil Beaton, 1969

The Warhol superstars came to symbolize the sexual revolution of the 1960s and 1970s. Their visibility in Warhol's films, at the Factory, and in New York's avant-garde cultural scene contributed to the representation of gay, transgender, and sexually nonconforming figures in fashion and popular culture.

In April 1969, Warhol and his entourage were photographed by Cecil Beaton for the exhibition 600 Faces by Beaton 1928–69 at the Museum of the City of New York. The photographs brought together "two figures who defined their eras' concepts of popular culture, celebrity, and sexual mores." The Factory members involved in this photo session include Ingrid Superstar, Candy Darling, Ultra Violet, Brigid Polk, Gerard Malanga, Jay Johnson, and Jed Johnson.

The superstars were also the subject of Richard Avedon's monumental work Andy Warhol and Members of the Factory, New York (October 30, 1969).. Avedon began photographing Warhol and members of the Factory in August 1969, initially taking individual and group shots before developing the work into a large-scale group portrait assembled from more than 200 exposures. The resulting 31-foot (9.4 m) photomural was first exhibited in 1975 at Marlborough Gallery in New York. It depicted Warhol alongside Paul Morrissey, Joe Dallesandro, Candy Darling, Eric Emerson, Jay Johnson, Tom Hompertz, Gerard Malanga, Viva, Taylor Mead, Brigid Polk. Prints of the portrait are held in the collection of several museums, including the Metropolitan Museum of Art and the Museum of Modern Art in New York, and the J. Paul Getty Museum in Los Angeles. The 1994 Calvin Klein CK One advertising campaign, photographed by Steven Meisel, drew inspiration from Avedon's 1969 portrait of the Factory crowd.

Warhol superstars Holly Woodlawn, Candy Darling, Joe Dallesandro, and Jackie Curtis were referenced in Lou Reed's 1972 song "Walk on the Wild Side," which helped bring the downtown scene surrounding the Factory to a broader audience.
