= Marie Menken =

American filmmaker (1909–1970)

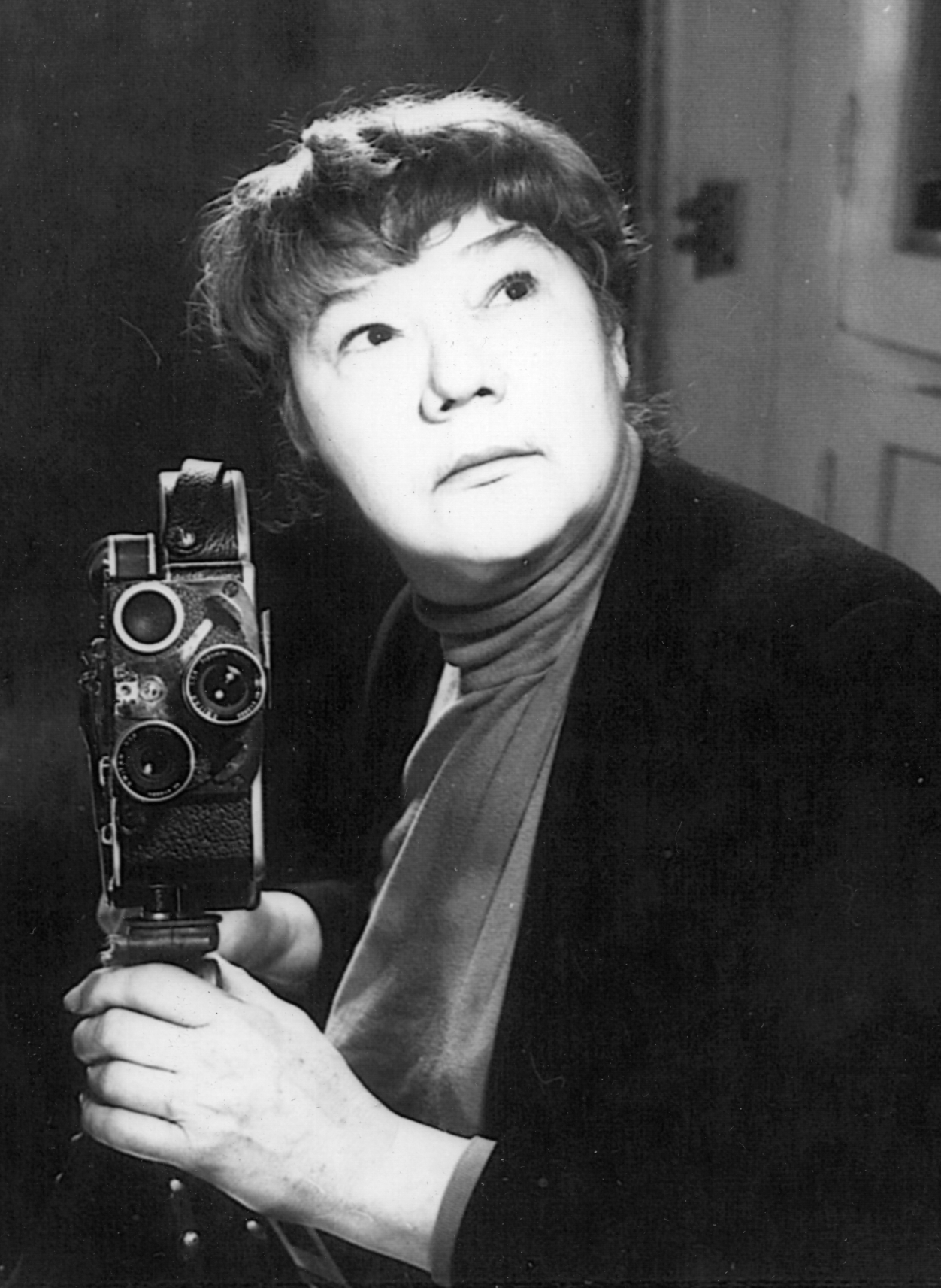
- Marie Menken with her 16 mm Bolex
- Born: Marie Menkevicius; May 25, 1909; New York City, U.S.
- Died: December 29, 1970 (aged 61); New York City, U.S.
- Occupation: Experimental filmmaker
- Spouse: Willard Maas

Marie Menken (born Marie Menkevicius; May 25, 1909 – December 29, 1970) was an American experimental filmmaker, painter, and socialite. She was noted for her unique filming style that incorporated collage. She was one of the first New York filmmakers to use a hand-held camera and trained Andy Warhol on its use. Her film Glimpse of the Garden was selected for preservation in the National Film Registry by the Library of Congress.

== Early life ==
Marie Menkevicius was born in Brooklyn, New York, on May 25, 1909, to Roman Catholic Lithuanian immigrant parents. She studied at the New York School of Fine and Industrial Arts as well as the Art Students League of New York and honed her craft as a painter. To support herself, she worked as a secretary at the Solomon R. Guggenheim Museum before receiving a scholarship from Yaddo and moving to upstate New York.

Marie Menken's parents (Mr. and Mrs. Menkevicius)

Marie and Adele Menken

== Professional career ==
There is no why for my making films. I just liked the twitters of the machine, and since it was an extension of painting for me, I tried it and loved it. In painting I never liked the staid and static, always looked for what would change the source of light and stance, using glitters, glass beads, luminous paint, so the camera was a natural for me to try—but how expensive!

— Marie Menken, c. 1966.

Menken and her husband Willard Maas began a well-respected avant-garde art group known as The Gryphon Group in the mid-1940s. It was around this time that Menken, bored by the static nature of paint on canvas, began to experiment with film. She released her first film, Visual Variations on Noguchi, in 1945 to acclaim within experimental art circles of the time. She used a hand-held and hand-cranked 16 mm Bolex camera for this as well as many of her later films, contributing to the spontaneity and agility of her work. Noguchi is a non-narrative film that combines quick, decontextualized shots of the sculptures of Isamu Noguchi with shrill, discordant music.

Menken and the Gryphon Group began to produce numerous short experimental films around the time of Noguchi's release. She also began to experiment with various types of animation techniques, including collage and stop-motion cinematography, owing to her background in painting.

Arguably her best-known film is Notebook (1962), which consists of short snippets of film she shot between 1940 and 1962, spliced together in a meditative fashion. Menken continued to make films that both were influenced by and commented on the various art movements her contemporaries took part in, including abstract expressionism in Drips in Strips (1963) and pop art in Andy Warhol (1964).

Lights, shot in New York City's quietest hours over three consecutive Christmas seasons from 1964 to 1966, is known for Menken's technique of "night writing".

== Personal life ==
In 1931 she met Willard Maas, a professor of literature at Wagner College in Staten Island. They married in 1937, but it was a rocky and unstable marriage, described as a "succession of fights and drinking bouts". Menken and Maas lived at 62 Montague Street in Brooklyn. As core members of the Gryphon Group, they were highly respected by the experimental and avant-garde art circles of the time. Menken was known for her association with and influence on many of the leading members of the movement, including pop artist Andy Warhol, painter and experimental filmmakers Kenneth Anger and Stan Brakhage.

According to the 2006 film documentary Notes on Marie Menken produced by Martina Kudláček, it was Menken who schooled Andy Warhol on using the 16 mm Bolex. The film presents previously unseen footage by Menken salvaged from basements and storage vaults, including a camera "duel" for Bolexes between Menken and Warhol; the two are seen dueling on top of a New York City building, facing each other with Bolex cameras and dancing in circles around each other while gliding across the roof-top of Menken's penthouse apartment. Menken later appeared in several Warhol films, including Screen Tests (1964), The Life of Juanita Castro (1965) and Chelsea Girls (1966).

== Style ==
Menken's painting style utilized unconventional mediums, particularly reflective materials such as glass, phosphorescent paint, and sequins. She attributed this to her desire to capture movement in her paintings, something that would eventually influence her move to film as well as her films' emphasis on the theme of light. Her background in painting was evident in her later experiments with animation, collage, and stop-motion work. Movement is prominent in her films, either slow and meditative or quick and spastic. Unlike many other avant-garde films at the time, her early films lacked any obvious symbolism, and were instead to be experienced purely visually.

Peter Kubelka wrote that Menken put the "medium of film" to its best usage and "transports the viewer to a new world ... Nobody before the invention of the Bolex and the usage of it by Marie has ever had in his brain material of thoughts of this kind ... I think Marie learn her filmmaking from letting the Bolex talk. Her films are expeditions, like Columbus, into a country she had not seen before herself."

== Legacy ==
Menken is lauded as one of the first filmmakers from the New York scene to endow the handheld camera with an elementary freedom, as it swings and sways its way around the scene. This was first apparent in Visual Variations on Noguchi (1945). Menken made this film while working as a studio assistant to Japanese-American sculptor Isamu Noguchi. Reflecting on the context within which the film was made, Menken shared:

I was working on something … for Noguchi, some special effects for The Seasons, a ballet by Merce Cunningham with music by John Cage, and while I was experimenting around, I had the advantage of looking around Isamu's studio with a clear, unobstructed eye. I asked if I might come in and shoot around, and he said yes. I did that. And when he saw that footage, he was entertained and delighted. So was I. It was fun. All art should be fun in a sense and give one a kick.

Visual Variations on Noguchi was Menken's attempt to "capture the flying spirit of movement within these [sculptural] objects". In an effort to express how she felt while looking at Noguchi's sculptures, she began dancing among them, capturing her own movements, affections and rhythmic encounters with the environment. After seeing the film, Stan Brakhage said:

Visual Variation on Noguchi liberated a lot of independent filmmakers from the idea that had been so powerful up to then, that we have to imitate the Hollywood dolly shot, without dollies – that the smooth pan and dolly was the only acceptable thing. Marie's free, swinging, swooping hand-held pans changed all that, for me and for the whole independent filmmaking world.

In addition to her treatment of the camera, both Brakhage and Jonas Mekas also celebrated Menken as the ultimate film poet. For Brakhage in particular, Menken "made a translation of poetic possibilities into the language of cinema". This is a historic role that some (including film scholar Melissa Ragona) have argued limits the critical contribution of Menken's practice, reducing it to a means of contextualizing (and bolstering) Brakhage's position in the history of experimental cinema. Indeed, Menken herself responded to Brakhage's determination by reminding him that "There is enough English poetry to read in a lifetime, why bother with attempts at translations from other languages?" But Brakhage is on record as having said, "If there is one single filmmaker that I owe the most to for the crucial development of my own film making, it would be Marie Menken."

Rather than identifying Menken's work as a matter of poetic translation, Ragona argues that Moon Play and Night Writing in particular explore the painterly possibilities of working with light as a material and celluloid as a medium/canvas. For Ragona, Menken's cinematic works are an attempt to push the limits of painting toward the kinetic.

In 2006, Menken was the basis for Martina Kudláček's documentary film Notes on Marie Menken. The film featured Kenneth Anger, Stan Brakhage, Gerard Malanga, Jonas Mekas, and Marie's nephew, Joseph J. Menkevich. In 2007, her Glimpse of the Garden (1957) was selected for preservation in the National Film Registry by the Library of Congress.

Menken's work was included in the 2021 exhibition Women in Abstraction at the Centre Pompidou.

== Filmography ==
Menken was highly prolific and also worked on many films attributed to the Gryphon group, its members, and other filmmaking circles. As such, this is only a partial filmography.

- Visual Variations on Noguchi (1945)
- Hurry! Hurry! (1957)
- Glimpse of the Garden (1957)
- Dwightiana (1959)
- Eye Music in Red Major (1961)
- Arabesque for Kenneth Anger (1961)
- Bagatelle for Willard Maas (1961)
- Notebook (1962)
- Mood Mondrian (1965)
- Andy Warhol (1965)
- Wrestlers (1964)
- Moonplay (1964–66)
- Drips in Strips (1961)
- Go Go Go (1962–64)
- Lights (1966)
- Sidewalks (1966)
- Excursion (c. 1968)
- Watts with Eggs (1967)

== Bibliography ==
- Suárez, Juan A. (2009). Myth, Matter, Queerness: The Cinema of Willard Maas, Marie Menken, and the Gryphon Group, 1943-1969. Grey Room, (36), pp. 58–87.
