= Screen Tests =

Series of short films by Andy Warhol

Screen Tests are a series of short, silent, black-and-white film portraits created by Pop artist Andy Warhol between 1964 and 1966. Filmed primarily at the Factory, the portraits generally depict their subjects from the neck up against plain backdrops. Of the approximately 500 Screen Tests Warhol produced, 472 survive, featuring a wide range of Factory regulars and visitors, many of whom were prominent figures in the downtown New York cultural scene of the 1960s. The films represent a new form of portraiture, presenting a slowly moving image of a person. They connect both to Warhol's experimental films, emphasizing stillness and duration, to his broader interest in documenting the personalities who comprised his social and artistic milieu.

== Background ==
Page from NYC Police Department booklet, The Thirteen Most Wanted, 1962

The Screen Tests were initially inspired by a 1962 New York City Police Department booklet entitled The Thirteen Most Wanted, which showed mug shots of wanted criminals. The same booklet was the source of the images in Warhol's short-lived mural entitled Thirteen Most Wanted Men at the 1964 New York World's Fair, together with a series of paintings using the same images. A second source for the Screen Tests was Warhol's interest in photo-booth portraits, which he had begun to use in 1963 for paintings such as Ethel Scull 36 Times and his first Self-Portrait series. These photo-booth portraits document the appearance of a sitter across successive moments in time.

== Production ==
In January 1964, while working with the police booklet images for his Thirteen Most Wanted Men mural for the New York World's Fair, Warhol filmed a series of short moving-image portraits of young men, the film canisters of which were labeled—echoing the booklet's title—13 Most Beautiful. The first Screen Tests were made at the home of Winthrop Kellogg Edey, one of the subjects in 13 Most Beautiful. Each film consisted of a single 100-foot reel shot with Warhol's Bolex camera, producing a portrait approximately three minutes in length. The subjects were framed from the neck up against a plain background in a composition resembling the booklet's mug shots, filling the frame while facing directly toward the camera. Warhol generally instructed his subjects to remain perfectly still and avoid blinking during filming.

Still from a Screen Test of Edie Sedgwick, 1965

After these early films, Warhol incorporated the production of Screen Tests into the daily routine of the Factory alongside painting, filmmaking, and other studio activities. Although a space was reserved for filming, sessions were rarely planned in advance and typically involved whoever happened to be visiting the Factory. Nearly all of the Screen Tests retained the static, front-facing composition of the earliest films. The resulting footage was projected in slow motion, accentuating the subjects' subtle movements and expressions. Warhol varied the lighting, camera aperture, and other shooting conditions to produce different visual effects, and some sitters were filmed multiple times in a single day. By the end of 1966, he had produced at least 500 Screen Tests, of which 472 survive.

The films were not referred to as Screen Tests until late 1965. Warhol initially described them as "film portraits" or "stillies", a portmanteau of "still movies." Unlike conventional screen tests used to evaluate actors for film roles, Warhol conceived them as independent works of art rather than auditions. In 1965, he also produced the longer films Screen Test #1 and Screen Test #2, which more closely resemble traditional screen tests.

== Selected list of Screen Test subjects ==
Many of the 472 surviving Screen Tests depict notable cultural figures. The following is a selected list of subjects who have Wikipedia articles, intended to illustrate the breadth of individuals Warhol filmed:

- Paul America (1965)
- Eric Andersen (1965) and with Debbie Green (1966)
- John Ashbery (1966)
- Benedetta Barzini (1966)
- Marisa Berenson (1965)
- DeVeren Bookwalter (1964)
- Susan Bottomly (1966)
- Joe Brainard (1965)
- John Cale (1966)
- Lucinda Childs (1964)
- Ronnie Cutrone (1966)
- Salvador Dalí (1966)
- Niki de Saint Phalle (1964)
- Donovan (1966)
- Marcel Duchamp (1966)
- Bob Dylan (1966)
- Cass Elliot (1966)
- Charles Henri Ford (1966)
- Ruth Ford (1964)
- Henry Geldzahler (1965)
- Allen Ginsberg (1966)
- John Giorno (1964)
- Grace Glueck (1964)
- Beverly Grant (1964)
- Bibbe Hansen (1965)
- Brooke Hayward (1966)
- Piero Heliczer (1965)
- Freddy Herko (1964)
- Baby Jane Holzer (1964, 1965)
- Dennis Hopper (1964)
- Peter Hujar (1964)
- Kenneth Jay Lane (1966)
- Donyale Luna (1965)
- Gerard Malanga (1964, 1965, 1966)
- Taylor Mead (1964)
- Jonas Mekas (1966)
- Mario Montez (1965)
- Sterling Morrison (1966)
- Paul Morrissey (1965)
- Nico (1966)
- Ivy Nicholson (1964, 1965, 1966)
- Ondine (1966)
- Peter Orlovsky (1966)
- Lou Reed (1966)
- Rene Ricard (1966)
- Robert Pincus-Witten (1964)
- James Rosenquist (1964)
- Barbara Rubin (1965)
- Francesco Scavullo (1966)
- Ethel Scull (1964)
- Edie Sedgwick (1965)
- Harry Smith (1964)
- Jack Smith (1964)
- Holly Solomon (1964)
- Susan Sontag (1964)
- Kipp Stagg (1965)
- Ingrid Superstar (1965, 1966)
- Amy Taubin (1964)
- Paul Thek (1964)
- Maureen Tucker (1966)
- Ultra Violet (1965, 1966)
- Chuck Wein (1965)
- John Wieners (1965)
- Jane Wilson (1964)
- Mary Woronov (1966)
- Marian Zazeela (1964)

== Books ==
In 1967, the book Screen Tests/A Diary was published, which paired still images from some of the Screen Tests that Warhol had filmed with poetry by his studio assistant Gerard Malanga.

The definitive record of the Screen Tests and their subjects is Andy Warhol Screen Tests: The Films of Andy Warhol Catalogue Raisonné (2006) by Callie Angell.

== Legacy ==
Film critic Philip Dodd listed the Screen Tests among his favorite films in 2002 when he voted for the Sight and Sound poll.

In 2009, The Pittsburgh Cultural Trust and The Andy Warhol Museum in Pittsburgh commissioned musical duo Dean & Britta to curate the DVD release of 13 Most Beautiful...Songs for Andy Warhol's Screen Tests. They wrote songs to accompany a collection of Screen Tests. The soundtrack was released in 2010.

Author Kate Zambreno wrote about the screen tests in a 2019 collection of essays titled Screen Tests: Stories and Other Writing.

In 2024, Warhol's Screen Tests were presented in a gallery setting for the first time as a selection titled Poetry and Pose: Screen Tests by Andy Warhol, at the Ki Smith Gallery on the Lower East Side of New York. Every portrait from various subject's single sessions were compiled for the first time.

== See also ==
- Andy Warhol filmography
