= Self-Portraits (1963–64 Warhol series) =

1963–64 series by Andy Warhol

Self-Portrait
- Artist: Andy Warhol
- Year: 1963–64
- Medium: Acrylic and silkscreen ink on canvas
- Movement: Pop Art

Self-Portraits is a series of silkscreen paintings created by American artist Andy Warhol between 1963 and 1964. Based on photographs Warhol took of himself in a photo booth, the series marks his first sustained exploration of self-portraiture. The paintings introduced Warhol himself as a Pop icon, applying the same serial, mechanical techniques he had used for his portraits of celebrities and consumer products to his own image. The series occupies a pivotal place in Warhol's career, establishing self-portraits as a recurring subject he revisited throughout his career.

== Background ==
By 1963, Pop artist Andy Warhol's reputation had grown rapidly following solo exhibitions at the Ferus Gallery in Los Angeles and the Stable Gallery in New York. He was known for his portraits of stars such as Marilyn Monroe, Jackie Kennedy, Elvis Presley and Liz Taylor, as well as Campbell's soup cans.

Detroit collector Florence Barron visited his studio in 1963 to discuss commissioning her portrait. She had been introduced to the artist by Leo Castelli Gallery director Ivan Karp, who instead encouraged Warhol to produce a self-portrait, which Barron commissioned for $1,600. Karp believed that Warhol's growing public profile made his own image an appropriate artistic subject, reportedly telling him, "People want to see you. Your looks are responsible for a certain part of your fame—they feed the imagination."

Warhol later recalled the episode in POPism: The Warhol '60s (1980): "I asked Ivan for ideas, too, and at a certain point he said, 'You know, people want to see you. Your looks are responsible for a certain part of your fame—they feed the imagination.' That's how I came to do the first Self-Portraits."

== Production ==
The series was derived from a strip of photographs Warhol made in a New York dime store photo booth. He enlarged one of the images and transferred it to canvas using the silkscreen process, producing nine paintings of identical scale from the same photographic source.

Warhol had begun experimenting with photo booth photography earlier in 1963 while illustrating an assignment for Harper's Bazaar, photographing figures including painter Larry Poons, curator Henry Geldzahler, and composer La Monte Young. He soon recognized the artistic potential of the inexpensive, automated portraits.

The same year, Warhol used photo booth photographs as the basis for his painting Ethel Scull 36 Times, a portrait of collector Ethel Scull, and his first commissioned portrait. The success of that work encouraged him to adopt the medium for his own likeness.

The photo booth suited Warhol's artistic philosophy because it was automated, inexpensive, and widely accessible. Unlike traditional paintings, which emphasized artistic expression or psychological insight, Warhol's images presented identity as something manufactured. Their reliance on photographic reproduction reflected Warhol's embrace of mechanical processes, consistent with his 1963 statement to art critic Gene Swenson of ARTnews: "The reason I'm painting this way is that I want to be a machine, and I feel that whatever I do and do machine-like is what I want to do."

== Interpretation ==
In The Guardian, art critic Jonathan Jones described Self-Portrait as "one of his best works," praising its "cool blue hues" and emotional resonance. He argued that Warhol's sunglasses and hesitant poses suggest an artist who "does not want to truly show himself to others," while the work simultaneously engages with the tradition of self-portraiture by depicting Warhol trying "his fame on for size." Jones concluded that the portrait demonstrates Warhol's achievement "not just as a great businessman, but also as a great artist."

Writer Jackie Higgins identified Self-Portrait as an example of Warhol's challenge to conventional self-portraiture, using the work as the cover image for her 2013 book Why It Does Not Have to Be in Focus: Modern Photography Explained:

The mechanically produced image refuses authorship, while its serialization creates a sense of narrative, much like a filmstrip, and the various silkscreened gradations of blue move the viewer's eye from panel to panel. Warhol appears in this mini-movie as if in disguise, his dark glasses masking any emotion, his face expressionless. This staged self-portrait frustrates our voyeuristic impulse. Warhol's faces are much like screens onto which we project our fantasies. His first self-portrait is perhaps more accurately an anti-self-portrait."

== Collections ==
A green Self-Portrait painting is in the collection of the Louis Vuitton Foundation in Paris.

== Art market ==
In May 2011, Self-Portrait, a four-panel acrylic silkscreen in blue hues, sold for $38.4 million at Christie's in New York.

In November 2014, a red Self-Portrait sold for $11.4 million at Christie's in New York. The painting previously fetched $6.8 million at Christie's in May 2011.

In June 2017, a turquoise Self-Portrait sold for £6 million ($7.7 million USD) at Sotheby's in London.
