= Artist's Assistant =

Artists assistants work with, and often under direct instruction from, artists in the production or preparation of art works. Many famous and influential artists have worked with assistants, including Barbara Hepworth, David Hockney, and Andy Warhol.

== Famous assistants ==
While the names of many artists' assistants are never known, some artists assistants have become famous in their own right either as artists or for their role as assistants. Italian artist Salaì was an assistant and pupil of the Italian Renaissance painter Leonardo da Vinci. American filmmaker and poet Gerard Malanga, and artists Ronnie Cutrone and Rupert Jasen Smith were assistants of American pop artist Andy Warhol.

== Controversy ==
The use of artists' assistants has been a controversial issue. The controversy primarily focuses on the assistants not being acknowledged for their work and questions of what constitutes art. Pop artist David Hockney described Damian Hirst's use of assistants as, "It's a little insulting to craftsmen, skilful craftsmen." This was in response to Hirst's use of assistants to paint his spot paintings.

Warhol often used assistants to help with his silkscreen paintings at his studio, called the Factory. Warhol was asked why he used a mechanical device to reproduce designs. "I tried doing them by hand," he admitted, "but I find it easier to use a screen. This way, I don't have to work on my objects at all. One of my assistants or anyone else, for that matter, can reproduce the design as well as I could."

The contemporary artist Jeff Koons uses assistants in a similar way, "I'm basically the idea person," he told an interviewer, "I'm not physically involved in the production. I don't have the necessary abilities, so I go to the top people.”

There have also been exhibitions about the relationship between artist and assistant such as that at the New York gallery Luxembourg & Dayan which hosted ‘In the Making: Artists, Assistants, and Influence’ – a show tracing the link between artists and their (eventually famous) assistants in 2016
