= Bike Boy =

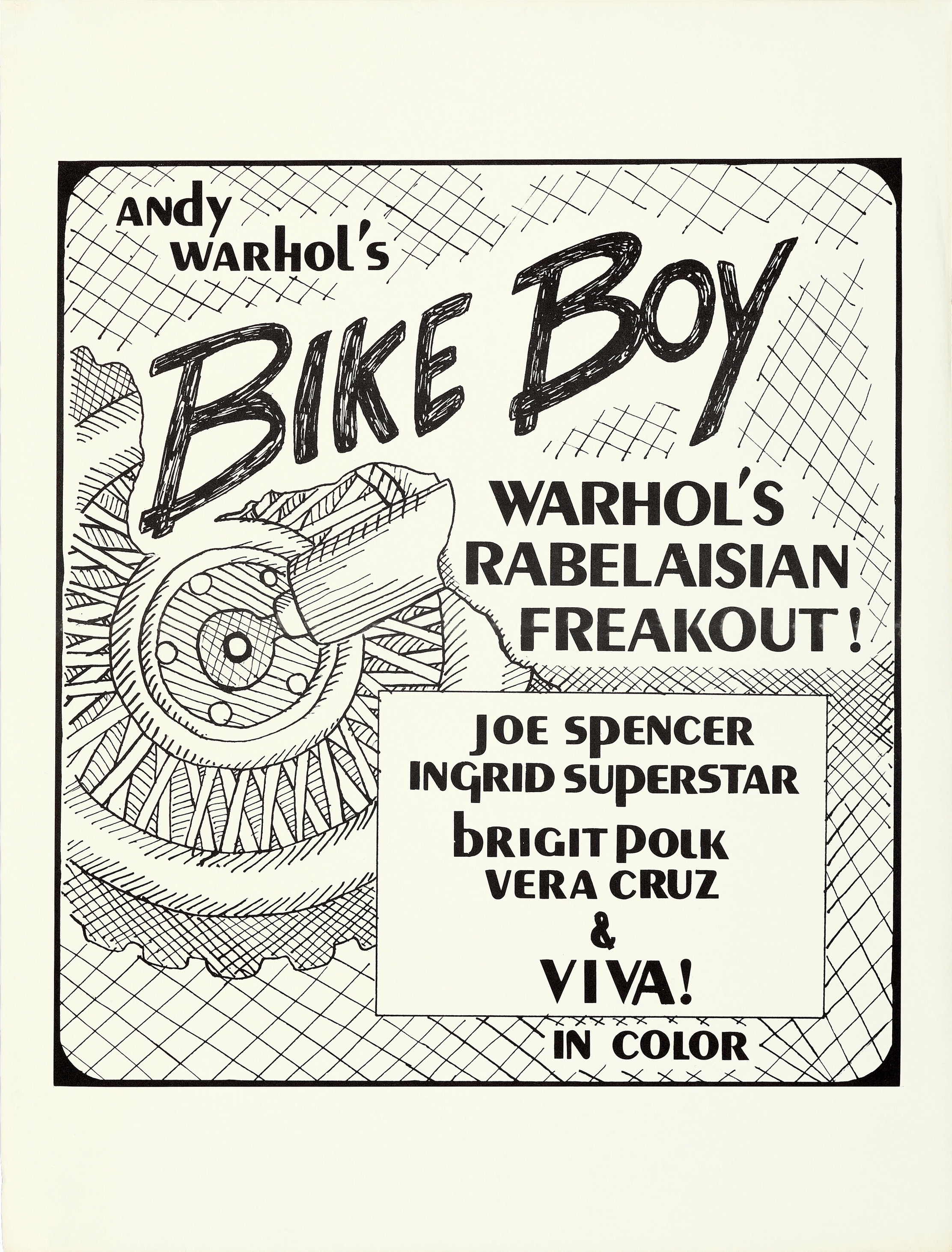
- Film poster
- Directed by: Andy Warhol
- Starring: Joseph Spencer; Viva; Ingrid Superstar
- Distributed by: Andy Warhol Films
- Release date: October 5, 1967
- Running time: 96 minutes
- Country: United States
- Language: English

Bike Boy is a 1967 American avant-garde film directed by Andy Warhol. The film follows motorcyclist Joe Spencer and features a small role by radical feminist Valerie Solanas, who attempted to assassinate Warhol in 1968.

== Plot ==
Bike Boy follows Joe Spencer, member of a member of the Hell's Angels motorcycle gang, as he navigates a series of episodic, non-linear encounters with Warhol's bohemian "superstars."

== Cast ==
- Joe Spencer as Motorcyclist
- Ed Wiener as His Buddy
- Vera Cruz as Fellow Cyclist
- Ingrid Superstar and Ann Wehrer as Older Women
- George Ann as First Salesman
- Bruce Ann as Second Salesman
- Viva as Girl
- Brigid Polk

== Release ==
Bike Boy opened at Hudson Theater in New York City on October 5, 1967.

The film's uncut footage was also included in **** (Four Stars), Warhol's approximately 25-hour film. This footage was later edited into a longer version of Bike Boy, which opened in July 1968 at the New Andy Warhol Garrick Theater. Renamed in Warhol's honor while he was recovering in hospital after being shot by Valerie Solanas, the theater premiered the longer version of Bike Boy alongside The Nude Restaurant.

== Critical reception ==
Howard Thompson of The New York Times panned Bike Boy, calling it one of Warhol's "super-bores" and writing that it "belongs in the Hudson River." He describing its characters as "a group of unappetizing young people slouch around in front of the camera, talking primarily about sex, directly or obliquely." He highlighted Joe Spencer as the motorcyclist writing, "There is some perverse humor as the twittering clothiers flutter around the new customer. But for the remainder of the film, which uncoils for two hours, the hero babbles incessantly and obscenely about his sexual prowess, capacity and versatility."

== Legacy ==
A negative image of Joe Spencer from the film, showing a skull tattoo on his upper arm, was used on the cover of the Velvet Underground's second album, White Light/White Heat, released in 1968.

Warhol recorded in his diary on September 16, 1979, that actor Richard Gere credited ''Bike Boy'' with inspiring him to pursue acting:

"Went to Lester Persky's Yanks party at Trader Vic's. It turned out to be a really intimate dinner for only about fourteen people. Lester arrived with Richard Gere, and John Schlesinger arrived and Tommy Dean. … Richard Gere said that ten years ago he came in on a bus from New Jersey and went to see our movie Bike Boy in the Village, and he said from then on he's been trying to be an actor—it took him eleven years, he said."

== See also ==
- Andy Warhol filmography
- List of American films of 1967
