= Clare Shenstone =

English painter (born 1948)

Clare Noel Shenstone (born 27 October 1948) is an English artist. She is considered notable for her cloth relief heads and her figure drawings. Her portraits hang in some major British collections including the National Portrait Gallery and the Sainsbury Centre for Visual Arts.

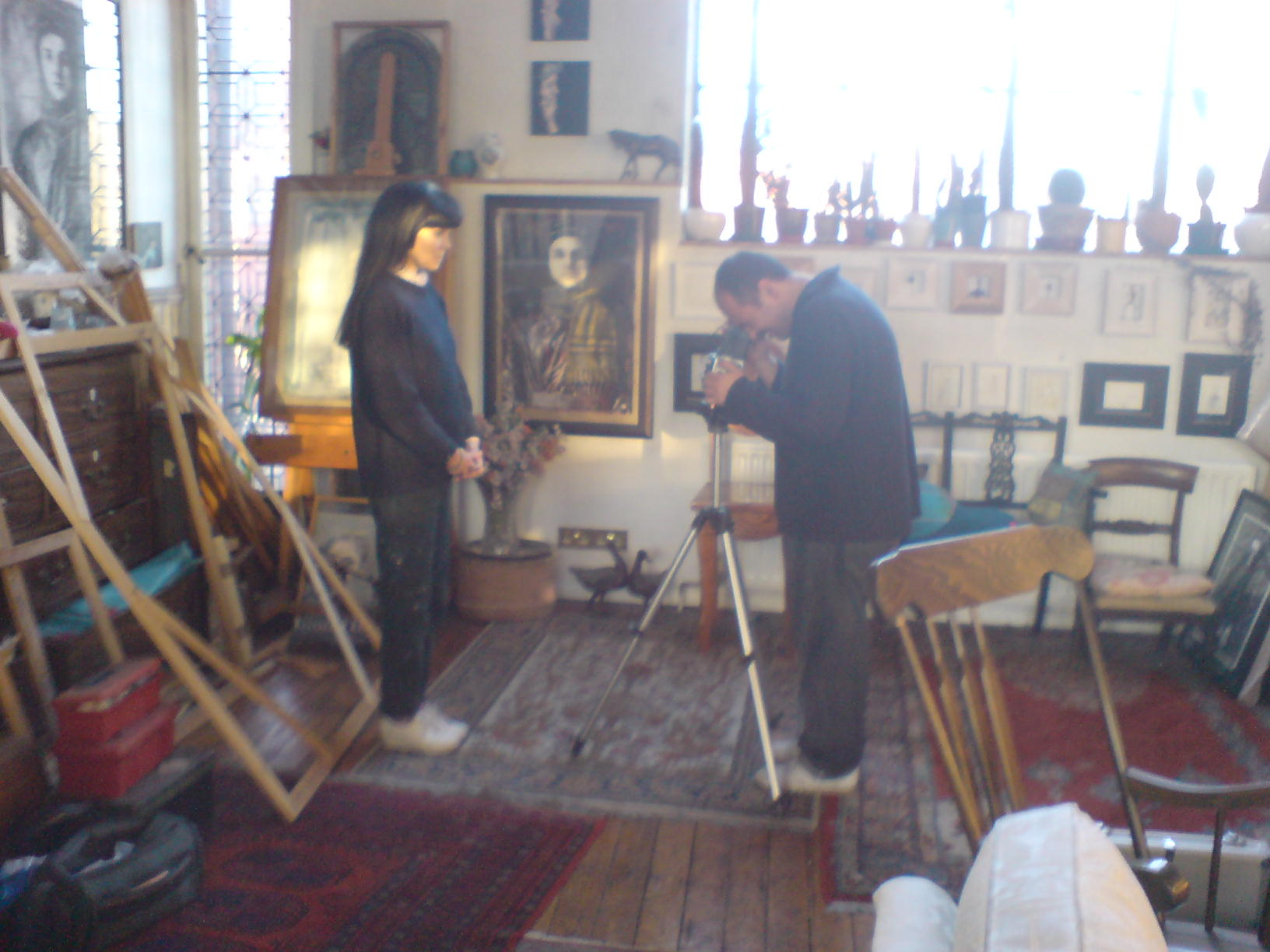
Photographer Matthew R Lewis taking a portrait of Clare Shenstone in her studio

== Career ==
Shenstone started her career as a model and stage acctress. A photo of her at age 16 appears on the poster for Chelsea Girls. During 1972 and 1973 Shenstone completed the foundation course at the Central School of Art & Design before entering the Chelsea School of Art where she completed a degree in painting in 1976. Shenstone then studied at the Royal College of Art, RCA, and graduated with a master's degree in 1979.

Francis Bacon saw her degree show at the RCA and asked to buy Janet – one of her images made out of fine cloth which she referred to as her "cloth heads". Bacon went on to commission a cloth head portrait of himself, which led to many sittings together over a period of four years, at a time when Bacon was largely reclusive. Shenstone executed multiple Bacon studies in oil, gouache, pastel, pencil and various experimental media. He became her mentor and great friend. When Bacon died in 1992, John Edwards, Bacon's friend to whom he left his estate, also asked Shenstone to produce a cloth head portrait of himself to hang next to those of Bacon and Janet. The National Portrait Gallery in London hold examples of Shenstone's sketches of Bacon.

Both the Manhattan Theatre Club Theatre in New York and the Oxford Playhouse Company commissioned sets of drawings from Shenstone in 1981. Among the group shows Shenstone participated in included the Whitechapel Open at the Whitechapel Gallery in both 1983 and 1984. Shenstone's connections to Bacon led to her involvement in the 1992 exhibition Artist of the Colony Room: a Tribute to Muriel Belcher held at the Parkin Gallery. The same venue hosted Portraits of Francis Bacon in 1998 which included Shenstones' studies of Bacon.

== Solo exhibitions ==
- 2007 - The Speaker and I, Ben Brown Fine Arts, London.
- 2005 - The Leicester Gallery at the Business Centre, London.
- The New Walk Museum and Gallery, Leicester.
- Naughton Gallery at Queens University, Belfast.
- ‘Anima’ Koichi Yanagi, New York.
- 2004 - The Leicester Gallery Commonwealth Institute, London.
- The London Art Fair
- 2003 - Langham Fine Art, Bury St. Edmunds.
- 2002 - Personification, The Sainsbury Centre for Visual Arts, Norwich.
- Robert Sandelson Gallery, London.
- 2000 - Langham Fine Art, Bury St. Edmunds.
- Garrick Milne Prize exhibition, Christie's, King St., London.
- 1999 - The Black and White Image, Wimbledon Fine Art. Lifeforms, Artmonsky Gallery.
- Woman on a Piece of Paper, Browse and Derby, London. Langham Fine Art, Bury St. Edmunds.
- 1998 - Portraits of Francis Bacon, Michael Parkin Gallery.

== Group exhibitions ==
- 2007 - 100 Jahre Kunsthalle Mannheim, Germany.
- 2005 - Star Portraits touring exhibition, County Hall, London.
- 2003 - Royal Society of Portrait Painters, Mall Galleries.
- 2003 - 25 Years, The Sainsbury Centre for Visual Arts, Norwich.
- 2001 - Hunting Art Prize, Royal College of Art, London.
- 2001 - Royal Society of Portrait Painters, Mall Galleries.
- 2000 - Royal Institute of Painters in Watercolours, Mall Galleries. The Pastel Society, Mall Galleries.
- 1999/00 - Browse and Darby, London.
- 1999 - Artmousky Gallery, London.
- 1998 - Robert Fraser Gallery, London.
- 1983/4/5 - Whitechapel Open Exhibition, Whitechapel Gallery, London.
- 1982 - Nicola Jacobs Gallery, London.
- 1980 - Lyric Theatre, London.

== Awards ==
- 2001 The Public Choice Award, Hunting Art Prize
- 2000 The Brian Sinfield Fine Arts Award

== Reviews ==
“Her very ambitious and wide-ranging exhibition Personification at the Sainsbury Centre was one of the most successful exhibitions ever held at the Centre”, Charles Saumarez Smith, Director National Gallery.

"Duality is essential Shenstone: engaging with humanity through images of name and unnamed individuals, but also exploring and extending art. We, coming to it, cannot separate the art-ness from the human-ness. They are interdependent, fused in the work.” Art historian, Norbert Lynton.

“Distinctive, penetrating eye for the psychological make-up of her sitters” – John Rosenfield, Art Historian and Professor Emeritus, Harvard University.

“Through Clare’s work, Lisa (Sainsbury) ‘re-established’ the close relationship she and Bob enjoyed with Francis Bacon. Lisa has commented that it is a curious experience to rediscover an artist in the process of discovering the work of another.” Dame Elizabeth Esteve-Coll, Director of the Victoria and Albert Museum 1987–95.

“Again and again she presents an image of someone close-by and alert, a bodily presence; again and again we are reminded that there is also a spiritual being, barely to be grasped by material means, one that we have to meet halfway by engaging with the only slightest touches of the brush.” Art historian, Norbert Lynton.

“We have grown unused to inventive realism. Clare does not fit into any obvious category of contemporary art. But the same was said of her mentor, Francis Bacon.” Charles Saumarez Smith, Director National Gallery.
