= Ingrid Superstar =

American actress, poet and Warhol superstar

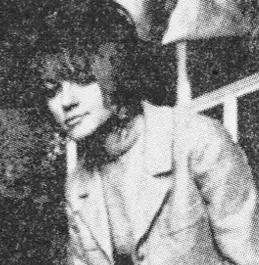
- Ingrid Superstar in 1967
- Born: Ingrid Von Scheven; November 11, 1945; Haledon, New Jersey, U.S.
- Disappeared: December 7, 1986 (aged 41); Kingston, New York, U.S.
- Status: Missing for 39 years, 8 months and 9 days
- Occupations: Actress, poet
- Years active: 1965–1969

Ingrid Von Scheven (born November 11, 1945), also known professionally as Ingrid Superstar, was an American actress and poet. She was one of Pop artist Andy Warhol's Superstars in the 1960s. After being introduced to the Factory by filmmaker Chuck Wein in 1965, she appeared in several of Warhol's underground films, including Chelsea Girls (1966), **** (Four Stars) (1967), I, a Man (1967), and Bike Boy (1967). Recognized for her candid personality, deadpan humor, and uninhibited performances, she was likened to actress Eve Arden for her comedic presence. Beyond film, Von Scheven wrote poetry, performed with Warhol's Exploding Plastic Inevitable, and modeled. She later withdrew from public life and struggled with drug addiction and financial hardship before disappearing at the age of 41 in December 1986.

== Early life and education ==
Ingrid Von Scheven was born on Armistice Day, November 11, 1945, in Haledon, New Jersey. She spent her early childhood in Paterson, New Jersey, and was the only child of German immigrants Ewald Von Scheven and Annegret Von Scheven. Her family moved to Wyckoff, New Jersey when she was 8 years old.

While in the fourth grade in 1954, Von Scheven performed as a soloist in the annual Christmas program at Calvin Coolidge School in Wyckoff. She graduated from eighth grade at Lincoln School in Wyckoff in 1959. She later attended Ramapo Regional High School in Franklin Lakes, New Jersey, where she graduated in 1963. During her time there, she was a member of the German Club.

After leaving home at the age of 18, she lived in Ridgewood, New Jersey before moving into a rooming house in Hackensack, New Jersey. She would frequent New York City nightclubs like the Peppermint Lounge when she was employed as a secretary.

== Career ==
=== Andy Warhol and the Factory ===
In the fall of 1965, Von Scheven met filmmaker Chuck Wein at a bar on 42nd Street in Manhattan, where he asked if she wanted to appear in a film. Wein subsequently brought her to Pop artist Andy Warhol's Factory, where she was cast in reels of My Hustler. Recalling the experience in a 1969 interview with The Record, she said: "I'd never even heard of Andy Warhol then. After the scene I was in was shot, I asked someone who the man with the silver hair behind the camera was. They told me it was Andy Warhol."

According to accounts from the Factory, Von Scheven was recruited in part to "teach Edie a lesson," as Warhol superstar Edie Sedgwick had become increasingly difficult to work with. When Chuck Wein introduced Von Scheven to the Factory, she was dismissed as the "poor man's Edie Sedgwick." Cultural historian Steven Watson wrote that, "On the surface Ingrid was utterly unlike Edie—she was rangy (five foot eight), big-boned and big-breasted, and crude in her style and language. She laughed loudly and she talked loudly." By the end of 1965, however, she had adopted a look similar to Sedgwick's, cutting her hair short, and was given the name "Ingrid Superstar." According to Watson, some at the Factory viewed the transformation as "a walking joke," believing that the "Ugly Duckling" was being presented as a Superstar. Warhol's assistant Gerard Malanga later recalled, "Ingrid Superstar was a sweet girl, terribly misunderstood, made fun of, joked at, but a sincere good-hearted person, who thought of herself as a Superstar."

Despite the comparisons to Sedgwick and the ridicule she initially faced, Von Scheven sought to establish her own identity at the Factory. She became known for her willingness to participate in performances that others declined, including appearing nude and giving blow jobs on camera. Embracing her status as a "Superstar," she developed a reputation for her candid personality and lighthearted sense of humor. Warhol recalled in his memoir POPism: The Warhol '60s (1980):

Ingrid was just an ordinarily nice-looking girl from Jersey with big, wide bone structure posing as a glamour figure and a party girl, and what was great was that somehow it worked. She was a riot . . . It was so funny to see her sitting there on the couch next to Edie or, later, Nico and International Velvet, putting on makeup or eyelashes exactly the way they did, trading earrings and things and beauty tips with them. It was like watching Judy Holliday, say, with Verushka.

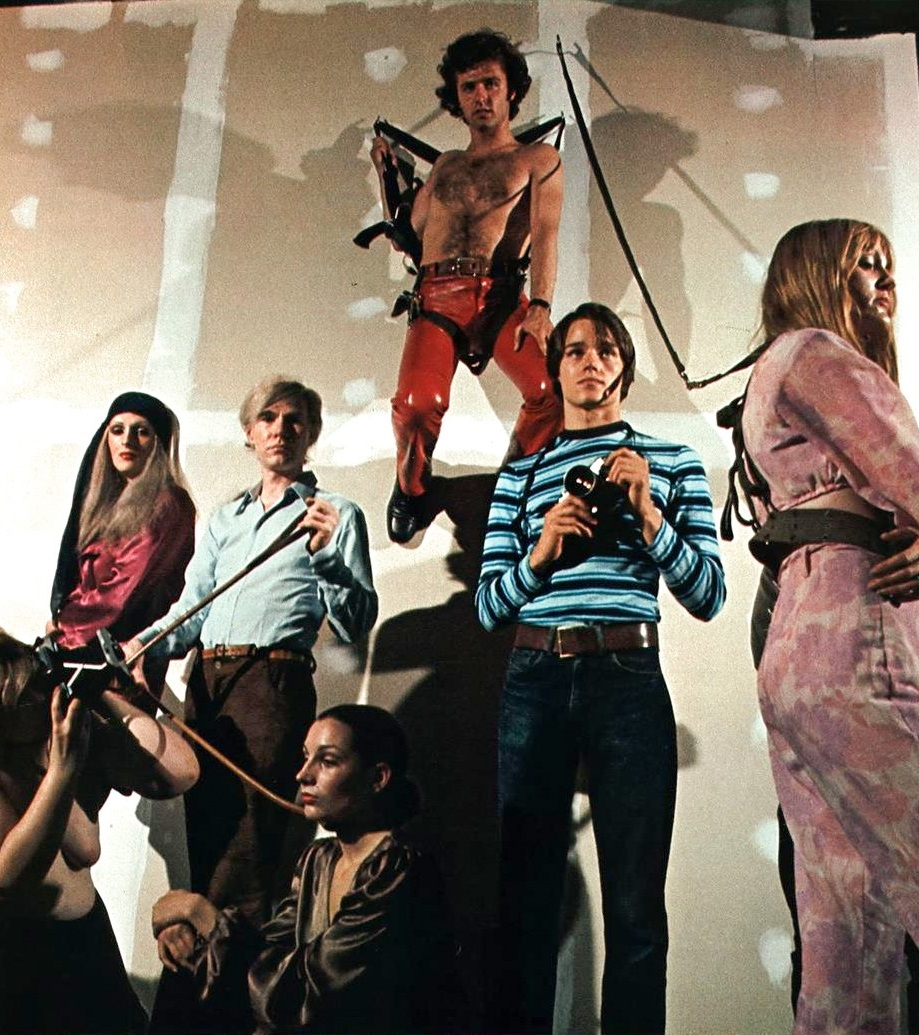
Ingrid Superstar (right) with Andy Warhol and members of the Factory: Candy Darling on the left, Brigid Berlin and Geraldine Smith on leashes, Jed Johnson holding a camera, and Gerard Malanga hanging on the wall. Photo by Claude Picasso for Esquire, 1969

In addition to her comedic performances in Warhol's films, Von Scheven wrote short prose and poetry. Warhol attended one of her readings at the Masque nightclub on Christopher Street and described her work as "good, really good, half comedy and half poetry." Her unpublished manuscript, Movie Party at the Factory: A Trip & Half, recounts a late-night gathering at the Factory on March 26, 1966, during which several films were screened. Describing one projection, she wrote: "They also showed a 'stillie' of Bob Dylan in color with violet coloring over the screen. This trippy illusion is achieved by swaying a thin block of colored plastic in front of the projector. This technique is is (sic) used quite alot (sic) in Andy's underground uptight movies."

In early 1966, Von Scheven played a shopgirl poisoned by Mario Montez in Hedy and portrayed Kathy in Withering Sights. By the summer of 1966, she had appeared in six of the twelve reels of Chelsea Girls and performed with the Exploding Plastic Inevitable, establishing herself as one of Warhol's regular Superstars. She appeared in the unreleased film The Velvet Underground Tarot Cards. Later that year, she portrayed Lady Bird Johnson opposite Ondine as Lyndon B. Johnson in Since. In 1967, she appeared in **** (Four Stars), I, a Man, The Loves of Ondine, and Bike Boy.

In 1968, Von Scheven traveled to California with Warhol and members of the Factory to film San Diego Surf. Shortly after production concluded, Warhol was critically injured after being shot, and the film was shelved. It was not publicly screened until 2012.

While Warhol was recuperating, she also appeared as an extra in a party scene featuring members of the Factory in Midnight Cowboy.

In the January 1969 issue of After Dark magazine, Warhol's film collaborator Paul Morrissey expressed his admiration for Von Scheven's authenticity, describing her as someone who was unable to present a false persona:

The one Andy loves is Ingrid Superstar. Because Ingrid can't dissimulate. She couldn't be not Ingrid. She could be marvellous if somebody knew how to use her. She could be marvellous on the Johnny Carson show … Well, no she couldn't either, because she'd freeze up. She can do her thing for us because she thinks we're trash. For important people—people she thinks are important—she tries to be well behaved, and comes on like she's retarded."

Hoping to transition beyond her Factory image, Von Scheven said in January 1969 that she planned to reinvent herself as a serious actress. In June 1969, Von Scheven reportedly planned to relocate to Los Angeles to work on a proposed Warhol film starring Candy Darling, with cameo appearances by Hollywood stars including Rita Hayworth and Natalie Wood. The project ultimately did not materialize.

=== Later career ===
In March 1969, Von Scheven gave a reading of her poetry at St. Mark's Church in Manhattan. She later expressed hopes of having her work published. The following month, it was reported that she would give poetry readings at nine universities, including Harvard University.

That same year, she modeled clothing for buyers at luncheons and in showrooms. She also appeared in the film The Mind Blowers, directed by Harlan Renvok, but refused to participate in an orgy scene that required nudity. "I think total nudity is a disgrace to a woman because a woman is more mysterious with her clothes on than off," she said. She explained that she had been comfortable appearing topless in Warhol's films because she was familiar with people at the Factory and she enjoyed combining nudity with comedy.

By November 1969, newspapers reported that Von Scheven had attempted to rent a New York City discotheque for a "Lost Souls" party, at which women would wear bikinis and men bathing trunks. The venue's management declined the request. In 1970, she reportedly visited Hawaii, where she attracted newspaper attention after arriving at Hawaii Kai wearing a maxi coat with "absolutely nothing but maxinakedness underneath."

In May 1977, Von Scheven appeared in a revue at Anzalone's Italian Restaurant in High Falls, New York, held to commemorate the 10th anniversary of Joe Runner's Clove Valley Theater.

In later years, Von Scheven worked in a sweater factory in Kingston, New York.

== Personal life ==
Her favorite film stars were Katharine Hepburn and Warren Beatty, while her favorite musical acts included the Doors, Simon & Garfunkel, and the Beatles.

In the late 1960s, Von Scheven lived in an apartment on East 17th Street in Manhattan's Gramercy Park neighborhood. She later returned to her parents' home at 166 Packard Avenue in Wyckoff, New Jersey. By the late 1970s, she was living in Kingston, New York.

Von Scheven struggled with a heroin addiction in her later years. According to fellow Warhol superstar Ultra Violet, she "ballooned up to nearly two hundred pounds, floated in and out of prostitution and drug dealing, and was at one point judged mentally disabled."

== Disappearance ==
On December 7, 1986, she went out to buy cigarettes and a newspaper and vanished. "There's a clear possibility of foul play, and we are intensifying our investigation," the Kingston police said, but she was never located. She was 41 years old at the time of her disappearance.

== Filmography ==
- My Hustler II: My Hustler: In Apt. (1965)
- My Hustler: Ingrid (1965)
- Hedy (1966)
- Withering Sights (1966)
- Chelsea Girls (1966)* Since (1966)
- The Velvet Underground Tarot Cards (1966)
- Since (1966)
- **** (Four Stars) (1967)
- I, a Man (1967)
- The Loves of Ondine (1967)
- Bike Boy (1967)
- The Nude Restaurant (1967)
- San Diego Surf (1968)
- The Mind Blowers (1969)

== See also ==
- List of people who disappeared mysteriously (1980s)
