= Glimpse of the Garden =

1957 film by Marie Menken

- Directed by: Marie Menken
- Release date: 1957
- Running time: 5 minutes
- Country: USA
- Language: English

Glimpse of the Garden (also known as Glimpse of a Garden) is a 1957 American short experimental film made by Marie Menken, showing film clips of a garden, with birds chirping for the soundtrack.

In 1958, the film won an award at the Exposition Universelle et Internationale at Brussels.

In 2007, the film was selected for preservation in the National Film Registry of the Library of Congress being deemed "culturally, historically, or aesthetically significant".

== See also ==
- List of avant-garde films of the 1950s
