= Soap Opera (1964 film) =

- Directed by: Andy Warhol; Jerry Benjamin
- Produced by: Andy Warhol
- Starring: Baby Jane Holzer; Sam Green; Gerard Malanga; Ivy Nicholson; Rufus Collins
- Production company: Andy Warhol Films
- Distributed by: The Factory
- Release date: June 1964
- Running time: 46 minutes
- Country: United States
- Language: English

Soap Opera, subtitled The Lester Persky Story, is a 1964 feature-length underground film directed by Andy Warhol, starring Baby Jane Holzer, and featuring Gerard Malanga, Sam Green, and Ivy Nicholson. The subtitle was used by Warhol since he used old television advertisement footage provided by Lester Persky.

== See also ==
- List of American films of 1964
- Andy Warhol filmography
