= Randall Bourscheidt =

American cultural administrator (1944–2026)

Robert Randall Bourscheidt (July 28, 1944 – April 19, 2026, and better known as Randy) was a Warhol Superstar and cultural administrator in New York City.

== Early life and education ==
Bourscheidt was born on July 28, 1944 and raised in Tulsa, Oklahoma, where he was also educated in its public schools. He moved to New York City in 1962 and graduated from Columbia College (history major) in 1969.

== Career ==
Bourscheidt's early positions included: Editor of the newspaper of the Episcopal Diocese of New York, Press Secretary to the Chairman of the New York Democratic State Committee, and a role in New York City's Department of City Planning in 1974. After working in the NYC Office of Management and Budget, he became Executive Assistant to Cultural Affairs Commissioner Henry Geldzahler in 1978 before being appointed Deputy Commissioner by Mayor Edward I. Koch.

Bourscheidt served as Deputy Commissioner of New York City Department of Cultural Affairs (DCLA) from 1981 to 1987 (Acting Commissioner in 1982–83) under Commissioners Henry Geldzahler and Bess Meyerson. He played an active role in the nearly three-fold increase in the New York City arts budget in the 1980s.

=== Alliance for the Arts ===
Bourscheidt was President of Alliance for the Arts from 1989 to 2010, through its integration into The Municipal Art Society (MAS) after his retirement. While at the Alliance, he published a series of influential reports on the economic impact of the arts in New York City and State—studies like these are critical for grant seekers and arts administrators making a case for arts funding. As well as two studies of the effects of the recession on the arts in 2009 and 2010.

The Estate Project for Artists with AIDS was Bourscheidt's attempt to protect thru estate planning the cultural heritage of the many artists with HIV/AIDS or other life-threatening conditions lost during the early days of the epidemic at a time when legal protections for LGBTQ people and their partners were non-existent. Started in June 1991, it initially was an project of the Alliance and was the first national program of its kind. Its archives, including the award-winning booklet Future Safe: The Present is the Future, are held at the New York Public Library.

== Personal life and death ==
Bourschiedt was married to Josef Asteinza, an architect and planner. He died at the age of 81 on April 19, 2026, in Albany, New York, from lung cancer.

== Boards and initiatives ==
- American Friends of the Paris Opera and Ballet
- Director, Artspace Projects, ?–2026
- The George Balanchine Foundation, ?–2026
- Center for Performance Research, ?–2026
- Director, City Center of Music and Drama
- Creative Time
- Chairman, Brendan Gill Prize Jury, The Municipal Art Society, ?–2026
- Moving Theater, 2003–2013
- National Assembly of Local Arts Organizations
- Chairman, New York City Advisory Commission for Cultural Affairs, 1995–1998
- New York Landmarks Preservation Foundation
- Master Plan Coordinator (~1999) and Board Member, New York State Theater at Lincoln Center
- Steering Committee, One Percent for Culture (now New Yorkers for Culture & Arts NY4CA)

In the early 1990s he began a lecture series for world cultural leaders, now the New York Times Arts Forum.

== New York City Ballet ==
Bourscheidt began attending the New York City Ballet in 1965, was a supporter for 60 years, and was a close friend of many notable ballet dancers. He was a friend of the choreographer and West S8de Story director Jerome Robbins and Lincoln Kirstein, the co-founder of the New York City Ballet. He also edited a book titled Lincoln Kirstein: Program Notes 1934–1991 (published 2009).

He was featured in the 2013 documentary Afternoon of a Faun: Tanaquil Le Clercq honoring his friend, the legendaty dancer, Tanaquil Le Clercq.

== Andy Warhol ==
For Andy Warhol, Bourscheidt appeared in the films Chelsea Girls (1966), Hedy (1966), and The Closet (1966). He was also in an Andy Warhol Screen Test (1966).

In 2018, he introduced the movies at a MoMA screening and participated in a moderated talk.

== Legacy ==
Bourscheidt's Archive of New York City Cultural Policy is held at the New York Public Library, with a preview available at https://culturalpolicy.nyc. As part of this project, one of his final civic contributions was to preserve and film hearings of the ongoing cultural planning process in all five boroughs at a time when Arts funding was once again precarious around a pandemic.

Over his 60-year career, he mentored generations of arts administrators and development professionals who later went on to run arts organizations, including the Andy Warhol Museum, Dance/NYC, and the Ford Foundation. His mentorees played and continue to play key roles in raising and distributing Arts funding in the United States Furthermore, some formed their own foundations.

== Publications and media ==
=== Books ===
- The Hudson Valley, A Cultural Guide (2009)
- Lincoln Kirstein: Program Notes 1934–1991 (2009)
- Tanaquil Le Clercq, 1929–2000 (2001)
- NYC Culture Catalog: A Guide to New York City's Museums, Theaters, Zoos, Libraries, Botanical Gardens, Concert Halls and Historic Houses (1994)
- Kids Culture Catalog (1998)

=== Articles ===
- Let the Arts Help Rebuild the Economy, Huffpost (2011)
- Arts Community to Obama: Here's What We're Fighting For, Huffpost (2011)
- Thoughts on the Passing of Edward I. Koch, Huffpost (2013)

=== Video ===
- MAS Short Talk: NYC AIDS Memorial (2012)
- Developing Audiences: Consumption and Capital, Columbia Business School (2010)
