= Robert Scull =

American art collector

- Born: 1915; New York City, US
- Died: January 1, 1986 (aged 70–71)
- Occupation: Art collector
- Spouse(s): Ethel Redner (divorced, 1975); Stephanie Scull
- Children: 3

Robert Scull (1915–January 1, 1986) was an American art collector, best known for his "world-famous collection of Pop and Minimal art". Born in New York to Russian immigrant parents, Scull dropped out of high school and had various jobs until his wife inherited a share of a taxi business. When this thrived, the couple started buying abstract art and later pop art.

== Early life ==
Robert Scull was born in New York City to Russian-Jewish immigrant parents who had anglicized their family name from Sokolnikoff. His childhood was spent on the Lower East Side of Manhattan. His interest in modern art began when he visited the Metropolitan Museum of Art as a ten-year-old boy.

== Career ==
Scull dropped out of high school, but studied and took some courses in art, while doing miscellaneous jobs. He worked as a freelance illustrator and industrial designer until his wife Ethel's father died, leaving them a share in his substantial taxi business. Scull grew his share of the business into his own Super Operating Corporation, which had 400 drivers, and a roster of 130 taxis, and was later known as "Scull's Angels". Scull even recruited Amy Vanderbilt, an expert in etiquette, to teach his drivers customer courtesy.

He and his wife started buying the works of abstract expressionist artists including Willem de Kooning, Barnett Newman, Mark Rothko, and Franz Kline. In 1965, they auctioned 25 works, as they were moving on to collecting pop art, including Jasper Johns, Robert Rauschenberg, Andy Warhol and James Rosenquist, with help from the dealer Leo Castelli. The proceeds went to establish the "Robert and Ethel Scull Foundation", with the purpose of raising money to encourage unknown artists.

From 1960 to 1965, he provided financial backing to the art dealer Richard Bellamy, and his "innovative" Green Gallery in New York.

The 1973 Sotheby's auction, "The Collection of Robert C. Scull", of 50 mostly Pop Art lots yielded $2.2 million, and was the first single seller auction of contemporary American art. However, the New York art world saw it as the "nouveaux riches cashing in".

== Personal life ==
He was married to Ethel Redner, they had three sons, Jonathan, Stephen and Adam, and divorced in 1975. His second wife was Stephanie.

== Legacy ==
In 2010, Acquavella Galleries in Manhattan hosted an exhibition, "Robert & Ethel Scull: Portrait of a Collection", with paintings, sculptures and drawings by Willem de Kooning, Michael Heizer, Jasper Johns, James Rosenquist, Myron Stout, Larry Poons, Andy Warhol, Frank Stella, Mark di Suvero, John Chamberlain, Claes Oldenburg, Walter De Maria, Robert Morris and others.
