= Willard Maas =

American experimental filmmaker and poet

- Born: June 24, 1906; Lindsay, California, US
- Died: January 2, 1971 (aged 64); New York City, US
- Occupations: Experimental filmmaker, poet
- Spouse: Marie Menken

Willard Maas (June 24, 1906 – January 2, 1971) was an American experimental filmmaker and poet.

== Personal life and career ==
Maas was born in Lindsay, California, and graduated from State Teachers College at San Jose. He came to New York in the 1930s and continued his education at Long Island College and Columbia University. He was the husband of filmmaker Marie Menken. The couple, married in 1937, achieved some renown in New York City's modern art world from the 1940s through the 1960s, both for their experimental films and for their salons, which brought together artists, writers, filmmakers and intellectuals. Maas had extramarital homosexual relations, but Menken apparently did not resent them; their shouting matches were instead a kind of "exercise".

According to their associate Andy Warhol, "Willard and Marie were the last of the great bohemians. They wrote and filmed and drank—their friends called them 'scholarly drunks'—and were involved with all the modern poets."

In the 1960s, Maas was a faculty member at Wagner College and an organizer of the New York City Writer's Conference at the college, where Edward Albee was a writer in residence. The filmmaker Kenneth Anger indicates that Maas and Menken may have been a significant part of the inspiration for the characters of George and Martha in Albee's 1962 play Who's Afraid of Virginia Woolf?.

Maas died in Brooklyn Heights on January 2, 1971, four days after Menken had died of an alcohol-related illness. He was cremated.

The Maas/Menken materials and letters are at the University of Texas at Austin. A selection of them is on deposit/loan (in Trust) at the Anthology Film Archives in New York. The Willard Maas Papers—a collection of about 500 letters, manuscripts, page proofs, photographs, drawings, play scripts, and film scripts from 1931 to 1967—is housed at Brown University.

== Films ==
=== As director ===
- 1943 – Geography of the Body (with Marie Menken)
- 1955 – The Mechanics of Love (with Ben Moore) original zither score by John Gruen
- 1943–48 – Image in the Snow
- 1956 – Narcissus (a film poem by Ben Moore and Willard Maas)
- 1966 – Andy Warhol's Silver Flotations
- 1967 – Orgia

=== As cinematographer ===
- 1955 – Dionysis (directed by Charles Boultenhouse, co-cinematography by Menken)
- 1956 – Narcissus

=== As actor ===
- 1965 – A Valentine for Marie (directed by John H. Hawkins)
