= Ethel Scull 36 Times =

1963 painting by Andy Warhol

- Artist: Andy Warhol
- Year: 1963
- Type: Acrylic paint and silk screen ink on canvas
- Dimensions: 80 by 144 inches (200 cm × 370 cm)
- Location: Whitney Museum of American Art, New York

Ethel Scull 36 Times is a 1963 painting by American artist Andy Warhol. It was Warhol's first commissioned portrait. The work consists of four rows of nine equal columns, depicting Ethel Redner Scull, a well-known collector of modern art. The artwork is jointly owned by the Metropolitan Museum of Art and the Whitney Museum of American Art.

== Ethel and Robert Scull ==
Ethel Scull (née Redner) was born in The Bronx, New York City in 1921. Her father was a wealthy taxi company owner.

Robert Scull was born in New York City to Russian immigrant parents who had anglicized their family name from Sokolnikoff. His childhood was spent on the Lower East Side of Manhattan. His interest in modern art began when he visited the Metropolitan Museum of Art as a ten-year-old boy.

Ethel Redner met Robert Scull, who was then a freelance illustrator, when she was studying at Parsons School of Design. They married in 1944. When Ethel's father retired, he distributed shares of his business among his three sons-in-law. Robert Scull was one of the beneficiaries, and built up a prosperous business.

Robert Scull bought every work in Jasper Johns' first exhibition. Ethel Scull 36 Times was Robert Scull's present to Ethel Scull on her 42nd birthday. Once questioned by an interviewer regarding accusations that he and his wife bought art for investment and for social climbing, Robert Scull replied: "It's all true. I'd rather use art to climb than anything else."

== Creation ==
In early 1963 Robert Scull asked Warhol to paint a portrait of his wife after the style of the Marilyn Diptych and Warhol's other depictions of Marilyn Monroe. At the time, this was at the height of the Sculls' fame. Warhol took Ethel Scull to a Times Square photo booth and prompted her to take 300 black and white photographs of herself. Warhol told her jokes in an effort to make her photographs more candid. One hand-colored photo-strip from the session is in the collection of the J. Paul Getty Museum.

== Significance ==
=== Portraiture ===
It has been reported that Warhol made around 1,000 portraits, many of them commissioned. In 1974 he accepted a commission from Gunther Sachs to paint Sachs' then wife Brigitte Bardot, and then also produced a portrait of Sachs himself. Other commissioned works include a 1985 portrait of Lana Turner paid for by the actress herself.

Ethel Scull 36 Times was Warhol's first commissioned portrait and the starting point in his business in making portraits at the request of wealthy celebrities.

=== Production method ===
Warhol's depictions of people were often created from photographs he found in the print media. A movie poster was used for the Marilyn Diptych. Ethel Scull 36 Times was the first time Warhol created a photo-based work using images he had created.

== Ownership ==
After divorcing his wife, Robert Scull claimed ownership of the painting. Ethel Scull claimed the art work was a gift given to her by her then husband, and was her possession. The artwork is now currently shared between the Whitney Museum of American Art and the Metropolitan Museum of Art.
