= Robert R. McElroy =

American photographer (1928–2012)

Robert Raymond McElroy (January 1, 1928 – February 22, 2012) was an American photographer who is best remembered for documenting the Happenings art movement in New York City during the 1950s and early 1960s.

McElroy was born in Chicago. A graduate of Ohio University, for nearly 20 years he was a staff photographer for Newsweek. He died, aged 84, in White Plains.
