= Ethel Scull =

American art collector (1921–2001)

- Ethel Scull by Jimmy De Sana
- Born: Ethel Redner; 1921; New York City, US
- Died: August 27, 2001 (aged 79–80)
- Known for: Art collector

Ethel Redner Scull (1921 – August 27, 2001) was an American art collector. Well known for her collection of pop and minimal art that she assembled with her husband, Robert Scull.

== Early life ==
Ethel Redner was born into a wealthy family in the Bronx in 1921. She studied advertising art at the Parsons School of Design. Her father, Ben Redner, owned a taxicab company that she and her husband, Robert Scull, would later inherit and run together under the name "Scull's Angels". Redner began her engagement with the New York art world as a student in the advertising art program at Parsons School of Design (she would later characterize her alma mater as "more of a finishing school". During the same period of time, she met Robert Scull—the man she would marry, and the partner alongside whom she would become a fixture in the Society pages of the New York media, and a significant patron of the arts.

== Marriage ==
Ethel Redner married Robert Scull, and they had three sons, Jonathan, Stephen and Adam. Robert Scull inherited a share of Redner's father's taxi cab company following Mr. Redner's retirement. After accumulating wealth in the taxi industry the couple broke into the art scene by collecting abstract and contemporary art. With the revenue from their first auction in 1965, they established the Robert and Ethel Scull Foundation, the primary goal of which was to support young artists. The Sculls' filed for divorce in 1975. In 1986, Robert Scull died.

== Commissions ==
Ethel Scull was the subject of Ethel Scull 36 Times, a 1963 painting by the American artist Andy Warhol, currently owned jointly by the Metropolitan Museum of Art and the Whitney Museum of American Art. It was Warhol's first commissioned portrait work. The piece consists of a grid of 36 screen-printed panels (four rows of nine columns) depicting Scull in different poses. Most poses appear twice, many of them flipped horizontally.

Another notable commission, Scull had George Segal create a portrait sculpture titled Portrait of Robert and Ethel Scull. The plaster sculpture features Scull wearing sunglasses sitting in a Victorian chair with Robert Scull standing behind her. This artwork is currently in the collection of Aichi Prefectural Museum of Art. Segal cast Scull in two separate casts the first being from her neck down. Scull's boots continue to be stuck inside the sculpture.

== Death and legacy ==
In 2001, while living in a retirement home in Manhattan, New York City, Scull had a heart attack and stroke that resulted in her death. Scull has been immortalized as "the Mom of Pop Art." She and her husband were also the subject of significant criticism because of their accumulated wealth from trading in works of art by living artists who themselves saw no share of any realized profits. For example, the October 1973 Sotheby's Parke Bernet auction where one of their art pieces, originally purchased from a still-living artist for $900, sold for $85,000. The Sculls saw themselves as fostering the careers of unknown artists; their critics accused them of profiteering and social climbing.
