= Attempted assassination of Andy Warhol =

1968 shooting in New York City, U.S.

- Location: Decker Building, 33 Union Square West, Manhattan, New York City, U.S.
- Date: June 3, 1968
- Weapon: Beretta M1935 (.32 ACP)
- Deaths: 0
- Injuries: 2
- Perpetrator: Valerie Solanas
- Verdict: Guilty of first-degree assault
- Sentence: 3 years in prison
- Judge: Supreme Court Justice Gerald T. Culkin

On June 3, 1968, American artist and filmmaker Andy Warhol survived an assassination attempt by radical feminist writer Valerie Solanas at his Manhattan studio, the Factory. Solanas opened fire with a handgun, striking Warhol once and critically wounding him, while also grazing critic Mario Amaya.

Prior to the attack, Solanas had been a marginal figure in Warhol's Factory scene. She authored and self-published the SCUM Manifesto, a tract advocating for the eradication of men and the overthrow of capitalism, and appeared in Warhol's film I, a Man (1967). On the day of the shooting, she went to the Factory seeking the return of a copy of the script for her play Up Your Ass that she had given Warhol, but was turned away. Convinced that Warhol and her publisher, Maurice Girodias, were conspiring to suppress her work, she carried out the attack. Solanas was subsequently diagnosed with paranoid schizophrenia and sentenced to three years in prison.

== Background ==
=== SCUM Manifesto and Up Your Ass ===
In 1967, radical feminist Valerie Solanas sought to have her SCUM Manifesto published and her play Up Your Ass produced. She presented the script of Up Your Ass to Andy Warhol in hopes that he would produce it. Warhol found the script so vulgar that he suspected she might be an undercover police officer conducting an entrapment operation. In his 1980 memoir Popism, Warhol recalled:

In fact, when we'd gone to Cannes with Chelsea Girls the year before [1967] and I'd given that interview to Cahiers du Cinéma, it was Valerie Solanis [sic] I was referring to when I said, "People try to trap us sometimes. A girl called up and offered me a film script . . . and I thought the title was so wonderful, and I'm generally so friendly that I invited her to come over with it, but it was so dirty I think she must have been a lady cop. . . ."

Solanas told Warhol that she needed money for her rent at the Hotel Chelsea, and accepted his invitation to appear in his film I, a Man (1967) for $25 (equivalent to $241 in 2025). In 1967, Warhol told the San Francisco Chronicle that Solanas headed a "very interesting" organization called SCUM (Society for Cutting Up Men). He described her as believing in "destroying all men," but added, "I don't believe in her organization." In August 1967, Solanas signed a contract with publisher Maurice Girodias of Olympia Press for $500 (equivalent to $4,828 in 2025) as an advance on the royalties he would pay for a novel. She invited Girodias to the screening of I, a Man, but their relationship soon deteriorated when Solanas realized that he could own both the SCUM Manifesto and Up Your Ass under the terms of the contract she signed. To make sense of the contract, she turned to Warhol for guidance. Warhol's lawyer Ed Katz determined that the contract had no legal standing, but Solanas refused to accept this. Solanas then focused on putting pressure on Warhol to make a movie based on the SCUM Manifesto and produce Up Your Ass. She would repeatedly call Warhol's studio and managed to obtain his home phone number. Paranoid that Warhol and Girodias had manipulated her, she became resentful. Girodias later recalled:

Then she got worse and worse characterwise. She didn't want to work on the novel she was supposed to write for me. The novel was supposed to be an autobiography, a personal confession. And she began getting extremely angry with Warhol. She felt he owed her a lot of money. But there was no contract, no written papers of any sort. I kept trying to pacify her vis-à-vis Warhol. And I am sure Warhol was doing the same when she went to complain about me. She got angry at me because I would not publish her SCUM (Society for Cutting Up Men) Manifesto, and because she could not write that novel. She transferred the anger.

Solanas asked Warhol to return the copy of the Up Your Ass script that she had given him, but he was unable to locate it. Warhol believed it may have been thrown out while he was at the 1967 Cannes Film Festival in France. After admitting that he had misplaced the script, she began demanding money from him. Solanas also began threatening Girodias at his office and pressing him to publish the SCUM Manifesto. In January 1968, she signed a contract for him to publish the manuscript; in the months that followed, she would complain to others that Warhol and Girodias had stolen from her.

=== Accounts of Solanas before the shooting ===
According to an unquoted source in The Outlaw Bible of American Literature, on June 3, 1968, at 9:00 am, Solanas reportedly arrived at the Hotel Chelsea and asked for Girodias at the desk, only to be told he was gone for the weekend. She remained at the hotel for three hours before heading to the Grove Press, where she asked for Barney Rosset, who was also not available. In her 2014 biography of Solanas, Breanne Fahs argues that it is unlikely that she appeared at the Hotel Chelsea looking for Girodias, speculating that he may have fabricated the account in order to boost sales for the SCUM Manifesto, which he had published after the assassination attempt.

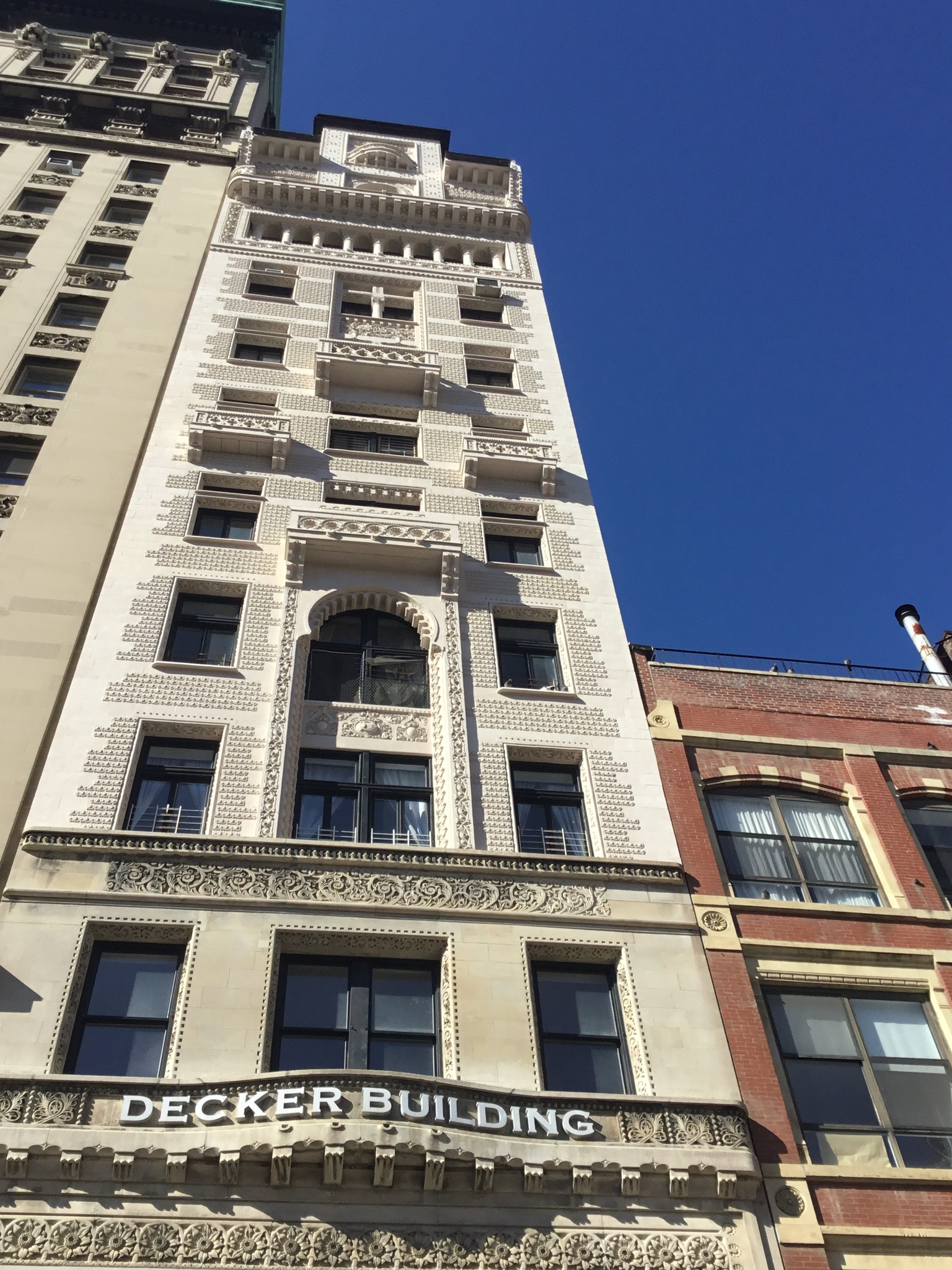
The Decker Building at 33 Union Square West, where the incident took place on the sixth floor

Fahs states that "the more likely story […] places Valerie at the Actors Studio at 432 West 44th Street early that morning." Actress Sylvia Miles stated that Solanas had appeared at the Actors Studio looking for Lee Strasberg, asking to leave a copy of Up Your Ass for him. Miles said that Solanas "had a different look, a bit tousled, like somebody whose appearance is the last thing on her mind". Miles told Solanas that Strasberg would not be in until the afternoon, accepted the script, and then "shut the door because I knew she was trouble. I didn't know what sort of trouble, but I knew she was trouble."

Fahs records that Solanas then traveled to Margo Feiden's residence in Crown Heights, Brooklyn, as she believed that Feiden would be willing to produce Up Your Ass. As related to Fahs, Solanas talked to Feiden for almost four hours, trying to convince her to produce the play and discussing her vision for a world without men. Feiden repeatedly refused to produce the play; according to Feiden, Solanas then pulled out a gun, and when Feiden again refused to commit to producing the play, she responded: "Yes, you will produce the play because I'll shoot Andy Warhol and that will make me famous and the play famous, and then you'll produce it." As she was leaving Feiden's residence, Solanas handed Feiden a partial copy of an earlier draft of the play and other personal papers.

Feiden then "frantically called her local police precinct, Andy Warhol's precinct, police headquarters in Lower Manhattan, and the offices of Mayor John Lindsay and Governor Nelson Rockefeller to report what happened and inform them that Solanas was on her way at that very moment to shoot Andy Warhol". In some instances, the police responded that "You can't arrest someone because you believe she is going to kill Andy Warhol", and even asked Feiden, "Listen lady, how would you know what a real gun looked like?" In a 2009 interview with James Barron of The New York Times, Feiden said that she knew Solanas intended to kill Warhol, but could not prevent it. (Note: according to assistant metropolitan editor Nicole Collins, "The Times does not present Ms. Fieden's account as definitive [...] we consider this just one angle of the story".) A New York Times assistant editor, however, stated that the paper "does not present Ms. Fieden's account as definitive".

== Shooting at the Factory ==
At approximately 4:30 p.m. on June 3, Solanas shot Warhol at his studio, the Factory, located on the sixth floor of the Decker Building in Union Square, Manhattan.

Solanas had visited the premises several times earlier that day seeking Warhol. She told Paul Morrissey, who oversaw the Factory, that she was "waiting for Andy to get money", but Morrissey attempted to have her leave, telling her that Warhol would not be there that day and that she could not stay. Around 4:15 p.m., Warhol arrived and encountered Solanas outside the building. He entered the Factory with assistant Jed Johnson, who had arrived at the same time carrying fluorescent lights from the hardware store, and the three of them entered the building together. Warhol recalled in his memoir Popism:

It was a very hot day, and as Jed, Valerie, and I waited for the elevator. I noticed that she was wearing a fleece-lined winter coat and a high turtleneck sweater, and I thought how hot she must be—although, surprisingly, she wasn't even sweating. She was wearing pants, more like trousers (I'd never seen her in a dress), and holding a paper bag and twisting it—bouncing a little on the balls of her feet. Then I saw that there was something even more odd about her that day: when you looked close, she'd put on eye makeup and lipstick.

Inside the studio were Morrissey, art critic and curator Mario Amaya, photographer Billy Name, and Warhol's business manager Fred Hughes. The phone rang; Warhol answered while Morrissey went to the bathroom, and Johnson went in the back to install the fluorescent lights. While Warhol was on a call with Warhol superstar Viva, Solanas fired one or two shots from .32 caliber Beretta automatic, striking him at close range once.

In the ensuing confusion, Amaya believed the shots had come through a window before realizing Solanas was armed with a revolver "like one of those you see in Dick Tracy." He suffered a minor gunshot wound and retreated to the screening room. Johnson was hiding in Warhol's office when Solanas attempted to enter; as he held the doorknob from the inside, she believed the door was locked. She then pointed the gun at Hughes, who pleaded, "Please! Don't shoot me! Just leave!" As she hesitated, the sound of the elevator distracted her. She appeared about to pull the trigger but instead left when the elevator doors opened and Hughes called out, "There's the elevator. Just take it!"

Solanas left behind a paper bag on a table containing another gun, her address book, and a Kotex menstrual pad. Hughes then called for an ambulance, which took more than twenty minutes to arrive. The shooting occurred one month before New York City's 911 emergency system was introduced.

Warhol superstar Gerard Malanga and artist Al Hansen arrived at the Factory shortly after Solanas fled the building. Hansen later described the scene he encountered:

The doors opened on madness: Mario Amaya jumping around, blood all over his shirt back, someone's legs sticking out behind the far desk, to the right an arm. Fred Hughes and Jed kneeling, holding the someone's hand, tears in his eyes. Mario presenting his bloody back and earnestly asking over his shoulder, 'Did it go in me? Did it go in me?' […]

'Who's the other one'—I nod toward the desk. Dig it, that's how far beyond my comprehension it was. Paul Morrissey said, 'It's Andy—Andy!'—'Valerie Solanis [sic], that ugly dyke, came in with a gun and shot him!'

Holy shit! I jump across to the desk. Fred Hughes: 'He's dying and there's no ambulance. Where are the doctors, the cops?' Andy is laying there the way bad gunshots do, like a sick dog or cat—his eyelids flutter. 'How long since you called?' There's not much blood. No sirens. Billy Linich, crying, stands looking down at him. Jed wipes his forehead tenderly. Andy Warhol with bullet holes in him, laying in his blood on the floor of his studio.

Hansen went in search of help, first inside the building and then on the street, struggling to reach the police due to busy pay phones and unanswered calls. When police finally arrived, he briefed them on the shooting and gave a description of Solanas before returning upstairs. He later recalled the scene inside: "Andy looks as if he's sinking. Jed is still kneeling next to him holding his hand. He could go any minute and there's nothing like a hand to hold at a time like that."

When paramedics arrived, they were reportedly told that an additional $15 (equivalent to $145 in 2025) would be required for them to activate the ambulance siren. The paramedics opted to transport Warhol down six flights of stairs in a wheelchair instead of using the building's elevator.

=== Hospitalization ===
As Warhol and Amaya were transported by ambulance to Columbus Hospital, Hughes and Johnson were taken in for questioning at the 13th Precinct police station. They were later released after Solanas surrendered to authorities that evening. Amaya was discharged from the hospital the same day, having been treated for a minor back wound. Meanwhile, Warhol's circle quickly gathered at the hospital to await updates on his condition. Among those present were several Factory regulars and Warhol superstars, including Ultra Violet, Viva, Louis Waldon, Ivy Nicholson, Billy Name, and Jay Johnson, as well as art dealers Leo Castelli and Ivan Karp.

Warhol was initially declared clinically dead, but Dr. Giuseppe Rossi was able to revive him by massaging his heart. According to Dr. Massimo Bazzini, executive medical director of Columbus Hospital, Warhol had been struck by a single bullet: "The bullet entered his belly on the left side, passing through the left chest, then the right chest, and out." The gunshot caused extensive internal injuries, damaging his lungs, esophagus, liver, spleen, and stomach. A surgical team led by Rossi operated on Warhol for six hours; he was given a 50/50 chance of survival. After surviving the surgery, he remained in the hospital's intensive care unit on the critical list for more than a week. "He is allowed no visitors except his mother and his two brothers. Soon Jed Johnson is permitted to see him. Distraught at the time of the shooting, he is calmer now and brings us daily reports of Andy's progress," said Ultra Violet.

Once Warhol was allowed to take phone calls, he took pleasure in chatting with friends. "When he begins to complain, we can tell that he is getting better," said Ultra Violet. At times, his remarks reflected his characteristic detachment and dark humor: "If only [Robert F.] Kennedy were shot a different time, I would have gotten all the publicity," he reportedly said (according to Ultra Violet), along with "Death is just another headline."

During his hospitalization, Warhol received an outpouring of get-well cards and letters from family, friends, and fans. He was discharged on July 28.

== Arrest, legal proceedings, and psychiatric evaluations ==
=== Surrender and arrest ===
At around 8 p.m. on June 3, Solanas turned herself in to a police officer at the intersection of Seventh Avenue and 47th Street in Manhattan, near Times Square. She told authorities that she shot Warhol because "I am a flower child. He had too much control over my life." While being booked at the 13th Precinct, she told reporters to read the SCUM Manifesto: "That'll tell you what I am and what I stand for."

Appearing before Judge David Getzoff in court on June 4, Solanas showed no remorse: "I have nothing to regret. I feel sorry for nothing. He was going to do something to me which would have ruined me." Addressing conflicting accounts of her motive, she added that reports claimed, "I shot him because he wouldn't produce my play. It was for the opposite reason. He has a legal claim on my work." She was arraigned on a weapons charge and two counts of attempted murder. Getzoff intended to conduct a preliminary "psychoing" in light of her conduct, but no psychiatrist was present, and she was ordered held overnight without bail pending a further hearing. She was then ordered to be detained overnight without bail pending another hearing the following day.

=== Psychiatric detention ===
Solanas was subsequently sent to Bellevue Hospital in Manhattan for psychiatric evaluation, and later underwent additional testing at Elmhurst General Hospital in Queens, where she was diagnosed with paranoid schizophrenia.

Girodias enlisted attorneys Irving Younger and Donald S. Engel to represent Solanas, but she refused their assistance. She also declined representation from a court-appointed Legal Aid Society lawyer, stating: "I don't want anybody to represent me. I could beat this thing myself." She was ultimately represented by lawyer and radical feminist activist Florynce Kennedy.

On June 28, 1968, a grand jury indicted Solanas for the attempted murder of Warhol. In August 1968, she was declared mentally incompetent and sent to Matteawan State Hospital for the Criminally Insane in Fishkill, New York. In September 1968, it was reported that Warhol had decided not to press charges against Solanas.

While at Matteawan, Solanas received regular visits from Geoffrey LeGear, who lived in California and rented an apartment in Beacon, New York, to be near her. Between August and December 1968, he visited her 26 times, often discussing her grievances against Warhol and Girodias and advocating on her behalf. LeGear wrote letters to Warhol and Girodias urging them to assist Solanas, including a plea for Warhol's forgiveness and concerns that she was suicidal and felt abandoned. He also relayed her allegations against Girodias, including claims of eviction, surveillance, and interference with her legal and professional efforts, while expressing uncertainty about their validity.At times, Solanas rejected his involvement, asking him to stop visiting and insisting that "Only I can interpret me."

On December 9, 1968, Matteawan officials declared her fit to return to court. She appeared before Judge Schweitzer on December 12, who ordered further psychiatric evaluation and set bail at $10,000. The same day, LeGear posted bail in cash, an act that led Solanas to believe he had connections to the Mafia.

After her release, Solanas sent threatening letters to Warhol. On Christmas Eve, 1968, she also called him in an attempt to pressure him into purchasing a screenplay she had written, prompting Warhol to contact the police. She also continued making obsessive and threatening phone calls to Girodias, Barney Rosset, Howard Hughes, and Robert Sarnoff, leading to her arrest on January 9, 1969. She was held at the New York Women's House of Detention in Manhattan until May 1969, after which she was transferred to Elmhurst and Bellevue for further psychiatric evaluation.

=== Conviction and sentencing ===
On June 9, 1969, Solanas pleaded guilty to first-degree assault, stating: "I didn't intend to kill him [...] I just wanted him to pay attention to me. Talking to him was like talking to a chair." She was sentenced to up to three years at the State Prison for Women in Bedford Hills, New York, including time served. When Solanas heard her sentence, she shouted: "Warhol deserved what he got! He is a goddamned liar and a cheat." Warhol was reportedly taken aback by the "light" sentence when contacted for comment. Lou Reed, a friend of Warhol, remarked, "You get more for stealing a car."

In March 1970, executive assistant district attorney David S. Worgan denied Solanas' request for parole, citing the seriousness of the crime. Two months later, she was transferred to Bedford Hills, but after only a few weeks she was returned to Matteawan to complete her sentence.

== Aftermath ==
=== Reactions and subsequent events ===
The National Organization for Women and other feminist organizations were divided on whether to support or condemn Solanas. Her supporters, such as Florynce Kennedy and author Ti-Grace Atkinson, portrayed Solanas as "a symbol of female rage." Shortly after the attack, Robert F. Kennedy was assassinated in Los Angeles, further enmeshing the shooting of Warhol in debates around gun violence in the United States.

To capitalize on the publicity surrounding the shooting, Girodias published the SCUM Manifesto through Olympia Press in August 1968. Although Solanas had self-published the work in 1967, this marked its first commercial release. Girodias later acknowledged that he would not have published the work if not for the shooting. While at Bellevue in 1969 and early 1970, Solanas continued to send angry letters to Girodias and Warhol, criticizing Olympia Press' handling of the work and insisting she deserved greater publicity.

In April 1971, Solanas escaped from Matteawan and was recommitted before she was released in June 1971. Later that year, Solanas was arrested and charged with aggravated assault for threatening Barney Rosset, editor of Evergreen Review. Solanas then underwent further psychological testing and was certified as mentally ill. Years later, she spent some time as an editor of the feminist magazine Majority Report. She spent her last years in destitution and died in poverty in San Francisco in 1988.

Warhol gifted Giuseppe Rossi, the doctor who saved his life, a $1,000 check and a complete set of ten Campbell's Soup II screenprints. The check bounced, but Rossi kept the prints. After Rossi died in 2016, his family auctioned the prints individually at Christie's in New York; prices ranged from $16,250 to $37,500.

=== Warhol's reflections on the shooting ===
In September 1968, Warhol told the Associated Press that he saw "'no new Warhol' as a result of the shooting. "'Before I thought it would be fun to be dead. Now I know it's fun to be alive.'" In the November 10, 1968, issue of The New York Times Magazine, in an article titled "The Return of Andy Warhol", he reflected further: "Since I was shot, everything is such a dream to me. I don't know what anything is about. Like I don't even know whether or not I'm really alive or—whether I died. It's sad. Like I can't say hello or goodbye to people. Life is like a dream."

In a 1969 interview with Newsday, Warhol said of Solanas: "I don't dislike her. I don't dislike anyone. It wasn't her fault [...] She wasn't responsible for what she did."

He later revisited the event in his 1975 book The Philosophy of Andy Warhol:

"Before I was shot, I always thought that I was more half-there than all-there—I always suspected that I was watching TV instead of living life. People sometimes say that the way things happen in movies is unreal, but actually it's the way things happen in life that's unreal. The movies make emotions look so strong and real, whereas when things really do happen to you, it's like watching television—you don't feel anything. Right when I was being shot and ever since, I knew that I was watching television. The channels switch, but it's all television."

=== Effects on Warhol ===
The shooting had a profound impact on Warhol and his work. Following his recovery, he focused on transforming the Factory into a more structured business enterprise as regulations tightened. His boyfriend, Jed Johnson, played an important role in his recovery, moving in with him to assist his recuperation and installing an alarm system at his townhouse at 1342 Lexington Avenue in Manhattan. He also added security features at the Factory, including a Dutch door and a wall around the elevator so that visitors had to be buzzed in.

Despite these added precautions, security remained fragile. In 1971, two armed men forced their way into the Factory, demanding to see Warhol. Johnson and Warhol superstar Joe Dallesandro ushered a terrified Warhol into the editing room and called the authorities. The intruders were ultimately given cash and plane tickets before fleeing the scene.

After her release from prison in 1971, Valerie Solanas periodically called the Factory seeking publicity from Warhol. For the rest of his life, Warhol lived with the fear that she might attack him again. "It was the Cardboard Andy, not the Andy I could love and play with," recalled Billy Name. "He was so sensitized you couldn't put your hand on him without him jumping."

Although Warhol survived the attack, the injuries he sustained may have hastened his declining health. In March 1969, he underwent a follow-up procedure to remove a fragment of the bullet left inside him after the shooting. According to his brother, John Warhola, the experience was deeply distressing and left him with a lasting fear of hospitals. "I'll never come out alive, so I never want to go in again," Warhol said. During the operation, his stomach muscles were improperly sutured, requiring him to wear a surgical corset for the rest of his life to prevent his abdomen from distending while eating. He ultimately died following gallbladder surgery in February 1987, after having long avoided conventional treatment for the ailment.

== In pop culture ==
The song "Andy's Chest" by Lou Reed is inspired by the attempted assassination of Andy Warhol. He first recorded the song in 1969 with his band, the Velvet Underground. He recorded a solo version for his 1972 album Transformer.

The 1996 film I Shot Andy Warhol, directed by Mary Harron, centers on the attack and Solanas' life and relationship to Warhol and the Factory in the preceding years. The film stars Lili Taylor as Solanas and Jared Harris as Warhol.

The 2017 episode "Valerie Solanas Died for Your Sins: Scumbag" of American Horror Story is inspired by the attack. Solanas is portrayed by Lena Dunham and Warhol by Evan Peters.

== Bibliography ==
- Gopnik, Blake (2020). Warhol. New York: Ecco. ISBN 978-0-06-229839-3.
- Fahs, Breanne (2014). Valerie Solanas: The Defiant Life of the Woman Who Wrote Scum (and Shot Andy Warhol). New York: The Feminist Press at the City University of New York. ISBN 978-155861-848-0.
