= I Shot Andy Warhol =

1996 biographical drama film by Mary Harron

- Theatrical release poster
- Directed by: Mary Harron
- Screenplay by: Mary Harron; Daniel Minahan
- Based on: The Letters and Diaries of Candy Darling, 1992 by Jeremiah Newton
- Produced by: Tom Kalin; Christine Vachon
- Starring: Lili Taylor; Jared Harris; Martha Plimpton; Stephen Dorff
- Cinematography: Ellen Kuras
- Edited by: Keith Reamer
- Music by: John Cale
- Production companies: Goldwyn Films International; BBC Arena; Playhouse International Pictures; Killer Films
- Distributed by: Electric Pictures (United Kingdom); Orion Pictures (United States)
- Release dates: January 20, 1996 (Sundance Film Festival); May 1, 1996 (United States); November 29, 1996 (United Kingdom)
- Running time: 103 minutes
- Countries: United Kingdom; United States
- Language: English
- Box office: $1.9 million

I Shot Andy Warhol is a 1996 biographical drama film about Valerie Solanas and her relationship with Andy Warhol. The film marked the feature directorial debut of Mary Harron. It stars Lili Taylor as Solanas, Jared Harris as Warhol, Martha Plimpton as Valerie's friend Stevie, and Stephen Dorff as Candy Darling. John Cale of the Velvet Underground wrote the film's score despite protests from his former bandmate Lou Reed (with whom he had collaborated on Songs for Drella, a concept album about Warhol's life, earlier in the decade). The members of Yo La Tengo portray an anonymous band reminiscent of the Velvet Underground.

The film was screened in the Un Certain Regard section of the 1996 Cannes Film Festival. To celebrate the thirtieth anniversary of the Teddy Awards, the film was selected to be shown at the 66th Berlin International Film Festival in February 2016. On June 12, 2026, Janus Films released a 4K restoration of the film for its thirtieth anniversary.

== Plot ==
The film opens in medias res immediately after Valerie Solanas' attempted assassination of Andy Warhol at the Factory in New York City in 1968, followed by her being taken into custody for the attack. The film then uses flashbacks to when Valerie was living in New York as a sex worker, then to her difficult childhood, then to her success in studying psychology at the University of Maryland, College Park. At college, Valerie discovers that she is a lesbian, begins writing, and develops a radical feminist worldview. This leads her to New York City and the bohemian underworld of Lower Manhattan. Through her friend Stevie, she meets Warhol superstar Candy Darling, who in turn introduces her to Andy Warhol. She begins writing the SCUM Manifesto, which calls for the overthrow of capitalism and the eradication of all men.

Valerie has a chance encounter with publisher Maurice Girodias, the owner of Olympia Press, who specializes in publishing controversial and transgressive works by writers such as William S. Burroughs and Vladimir Nabokov. While Valerie wants Warhol to produce her play Up Your Ass, Girodias wants her to write an erotic novel for him. Warhol's retinue steals the copy of Up Your Ass that Valerie gave to him and lies about it, saying it was lost; as partial compensation, Warhol casts her in a minor role in the film I, a Man. Valerie signs a contract for two novels with Girodias, but quickly becomes suspicious of the deal and his motivations. Her increasing derangement leads her to believe that Warhol and Girodias are conspiring to steal her work and control her, and she turns militant amidst the radical political climate of 1968. On June 3, 1968, she visits Warhol's office at the Factory and shoots him; on the street, she hands her gun to a policeman, to whom she gleefully admits that "I shot Andy Warhol".

Warhol never fully recovers from the shooting; a decade later, outside Studio 54, he hears a car engine misfiring and imagines Solanas lurking behind him.

== Cast ==
- Lili Taylor as Valerie Solanas
- Jared Harris as Andy Warhol
- Stephen Dorff as Candy Darling
- Martha Plimpton as Stevie
- Lothaire Bluteau as Maurice Girodias
- Anna Levine as Iris
- Peter Friedman as Alan Burke
- Tahnee Welch as Viva
- Jamie Harrold as Jackie Curtis
- Donovan Leitch as Gerard Malanga
- Jim Lyons as Billy Name
- Michael Imperioli as Ondine
- Reg Rogers as Paul Morrissey
- Bill Sage as Tom Baker
- Justin Theroux as Mark
- Jill Hennessy as Laura
- Coco McPherson as Brigid Berlin
- Lorraine Farris as Susan
- Isabel Gillies as Alison
- Craig Chester as Fred Hughes
- Victor Browne as Danny
- Billy Erb as Rotten Rita
- Anh Duong as Comtesse de Courcy
- Myriam Cyr as Ultra Violet
- Mark Margolis as Louis Solanas, Valerie's father

== Background ==
Initially intended as a BBC documentary, the film was directed by Mary Harron, who co-wrote the screenplay with Daniel Minahan.

Dana Heller of Eastern Michigan University argues that the film stages the conflict between Solanas and Warhol as less the result of gender politics – particularly because Solanas intended no connection between her writing and the shooting – than of the decline of print culture as represented by Solanas in the face of new media as embodied by Warhol and the pop art movement. In the screenplay, Harron and Minahan describe Solanas as "banging at an ancient typewriter", and the film frequently shows her typing, for which she is mocked by Warhol and other Factory regulars. Solanas' writing is set against the new technologies of reproduction championed by Warhol.

Many people who knew Solanas and Warhol tried to rationalize the shooting. Stephen Koch, who in 1973 wrote a study of Warhol's film, stated: "Valerie lives in terror of dependence: That is what the SCUM Manifesto is about, an absolute terror before the experience of need. Like Warhol, Solanas is obsessed with an image of autonomy, except that... she has played the obsession desperately, rather than with Warhol's famous cool."

Harron expressed regret at the final epilogue listing that the Manifesto "has become a classic radical feminist text", stating:

Oh, yes… People did dislike that. To be honest, it was not me who wanted that as the last line. I wanted a very deadpan last line saying that Solanas died in a welfare hotel in San Francisco in 1988. But these young women at Killer Films wanted to end on a positive note. I should have said, “Tough break, that’s ridiculous.” Occasionally, I give in to things and regret them, because that’s not what I'm trying to say. That's not what the film is. It's not making those judgments. It's a story; you can make your own judgments. I actually would love to change that last line. She's kind of a nihilist. I think the note at the end was an attempt to make the film more conventionally political and it's not. I have my own kind of fairly conventional politics, but that's not what my work is. I’m not trying to give a line. I’m uncovering and exploring aspects of history that deserved to be uncovered and explored. I felt a burning loyalty and devotion, in some ways, to doing this for Valerie. But that's not to say I'm trying to present her in conventional political terms or say everything she did was right. I just felt she deserved attention.

== Reception ==
Film review aggregator Rotten Tomatoes reported that 80% of 35 critics gave the film positive reviews. On Metacritic, it has a weighted score of 75/100, based on 20 critics, denoting "generally favorable" reviews.

Roger Ebert gave the film 3.5 stars out of 4, writing that Harron had done "two remarkable things in her movie: She makes Solanas almost sympathetic and sometimes moving and funny, and she creates a portrait of the Factory that’s devastating and convincing." Ebert stated that the film would not be for everyone, but praised it for showing "the person beneath the skin, and to reveal that even the strangest behavior is often simply a strategy for obtaining what we all require, love and recognition."

=== Awards and nominations ===
==== Wins ====
- Gijón International Film Festival Best Art Direction – Thérèse DePrez
- Seattle International Film Festival Golden Space Needle Award for Best Actress – Lili Taylor
- Stockholm Film Festival Award for Best Actress – Lili Taylor
- Sundance Film Festival Special Recognition for Outstanding Performance – Lili Taylor

==== Nominations ====
- Independent Spirit Awards Best First Feature – Mary Harron, Tom Kalin, and Christine Vachon
- Stockholm Film Festival Bronze Horse
- Sundance Film Festival Grand Jury Prize – Dramatic

== Home media ==
I Shot Andy Warhol was released on Region 1 DVD on January 23, 2001.

== Soundtrack ==
I Shot Andy Warhol: Music From And Inspired By The Motion Picture

Soundtrack album by Various Artists
- Released: 30 April 1996
- Genre: Soundtrack
- Length: 43:11
- Label: TAG Recordings / Atlantic Records

No.	Title	Writer(s)	Artist	Length
1.	"Season of the Witch"	Donovan	Luna	5:19
2.	"Do You Believe In Magic"	John Sebastian	The Lovin' Spoonful	2:06
3.	"Love Is All Around"	Reg Presley	R.E.M.	3:05
4.	"Burned"	Neil Young	Wilco	2:34
5.	"Itchycoo Park"	Ronnie Lane / Steve Marriott	Ben Lee	3:04
6.	"Sunshine Superman"	Donovan	Jewel	5:01
7.	"Mas que Nada"	Jorge Ben	Sérgio Mendes and Brasil '66	2:38
8.	"Gimi a Little Break"	Arthur Lee	Love	2:02
9.	"Sensitive Euro Man"	Pavement	Pavement	3:16
10.	"Kick Out the Jams"	Dennis Thompson / Frederick D. Smith / Michael Davis / Robert Derminer / Wayne Kramer	MC5	2:54
11.	"I'll Keep It with Mine"	Bob Dylan	Bettie Serveert	4:09
12.	"Demons"	Georgia Hubley / Ira Kaplan	Yo La Tengo	3:37
13.	"I Shot Andy Warhol Suite"	John Cale	John Cale	3:26
Total length:				43:11

=== Songs not featured on the soundtrack ===
- "Walk On By" – Dionne Warwick
- "One Note Samba" – Antônio Carlos Jobim
- "The More I See You" – Chris Montez
- "Caro Nome (Gilda's Aria) from Rigoletto" – Daniela Lojarro
- "Grazing in the Grass" – Hugh Masekela
- "The Red Telephone" – Love
- "Summertime Blues" – Blue Cheer
- "Ain't Gonna Bump No More (With No Big Fat Woman)" – Joe Tex

== Bibliography ==
- Heller, Dana (2008). "Shooting Solanas: Radical Feminist History and the Technology of Failure". In Hesford, Victoria; Diedrich, Lisa (eds.). Feminist Time Against Nation Time: Gender, Politics, and the Nation-State in an Age of Permanent War. Lanham, MD: Lexington Books. ISBN 9780739111239.
