= SCUM Manifesto =

1967 radical feminist manifesto by Valerie Solanas

- Cover of the first commercial edition
- Author: Valerie Solanas
- Language: English
- Subject: Anarchism; radical feminism
- Publication date: 1967 (self-published); 1968 (commercial publication)
- Publication place: United States
- Pages: Original edition: 21 & cover p.
- ISBN: 978-1-85984-553-0

SCUM Manifesto is a manifesto by American radical feminist writer Valerie Solanas which was first self-published in 1967. Sometimes described as a satire or parody, it declares male biological and moral inferiority the cause of the ills of humankind and advocates eliminating men, urging women to "overthrow the government, eliminate the money system, institute complete automation and eliminate the male sex".

The term SCUM appeared on the cover of the first edition from Olympia Press, published in 1968 following Solanas's attempted assassination of Andy Warhol, as "S.C.U.M. (Society for Cutting Up Men)". Solanas objected, insisting that SCUM was not an acronym, although the longer title appeared in a Village Voice ad she had written in 1967.

The SCUM Manifesto was little known until the attempt on Warhol's life by Solanas, which brought significant public attention to her and the manifesto.

== Publication history ==
Solanas wrote SCUM Manifesto between 1966 and 1967. In 1967, she self-published the first edition by making two thousand mimeographed copies and selling them on the streets of Greenwich Village, Manhattan. Solanas charged women one dollar and men two dollars each for a copy. By the following spring, about 400 copies had been sold. Solanas signed a contract for a novel in August 1967 with publisher Maurice Girodias of Olympia Press, but asked him to accept the SCUM Manifesto in its place later that year.

Following Solanas's attempted assassination of Andy Warhol in 1968, Girodias quickly published a commercial edition of SCUM Manifesto through Olympia Press. This edition included a preface by Girodias and an essay, "Wonder Waif Meets Super Neuter", by the satirist Paul Krassner. (Note: Girodias published a second edition in 1970 with a foreword by radical feminist essayist Vivian Gornick.) The back cover included a reproduction of the front page of the New York Post with the headline "Andy Warhol Fights for Life". Solanas objected to the editorial changes made by Girodias, including the elaboration of SCUM as "S. C. U. M. (Society for Cutting Up Men)". In an interview with The Village Voice, Solanas commented that "none of the corrections ... [she] wanted made were included and that many other changes in wording were made—all for the worse—and that there were many 'typographical errors': words and even extended parts of sentences left out, rendering the passages they should've been in incoherent." Following the bankruptcy of Olympia Press, the copyright reverted to Solanas, who self-published a new edition in 1977 stating, "This is the CORRECT Valerie Solanas edition", and adding an introduction "by Valerie Solanas".

The SCUM Manifesto has been reprinted at least 10 times in English and translated into Croatian, Czech, Finnish, French, German, Hebrew, Italian, Spanish, Swedish, Turkish, Portuguese, Dutch, and Danish. It has also been excerpted in several feminist anthologies, including Sisterhood Is Powerful (1970), a collection of radical feminist writing edited by Robin Morgan. The 1998 French edition, republished by 1001 Nuits in 2005, includes a preface by the French novelist Michel Houellebecq. The 1996 edition by AK Press included a biography by Freddie Baer, and was based on the 1991 Phoenix Press version, which was based on the 1983 Matriarchy Study Group, London, version. Verso Books published an edition in 2004 based on Olympia Press's 1971 London edition and containing an introduction by the feminist philosopher Avital Ronell. Jon Purkis and James Bowen describe the SCUM Manifesto as a "pamphlet which has become one of the longest surviving perennials of anarchist publishing".

Solanas's sister, Judith A. Solanas Martinez, is the reported copyright holder of the SCUM Manifesto by 1997 renewal.

== Contents ==
The 1967 self-published edition of the SCUM Manifesto opens with the following declaration:

'Life' in this 'society' being, at best, an utter bore and no aspect of 'society' being at all relevant to women, there remains to civic-minded, responsible, thrill-seeking females only to overthrow the government, eliminate the money system, institute complete automation and eliminate the male sex.

The 1968 Olympia Press edition is slightly different:

Life in this society being, at best, an utter bore and no aspect of society being at all relevant to women, there remains to civic-minded, responsible, thrill-seeking females only to overthrow the government, eliminate the money system, institute complete automation and destroy the male sex.

Solanas begins by presenting a theory of the male as an "incomplete female" who is genetically deficient due to the small size of the Y chromosome. According to Solanas, this genetic deficiency causes men to be emotionally limited, egocentric, incapable of mental passion or genuine interaction, lacking in empathy, and unable to relate to anything apart from their own physical sensations.

The Manifesto continues by arguing that the male spends his life attempting to become female and thereby overcome his inferiority. He does this by "constantly seeking out, fraternizing with and trying to live through and fuse with the female". Solanas rejects Sigmund Freud's theory of penis envy, and argues instead that men have "pussy envy". Solanas accuses men of turning the world into a "shitpile" and presents a long list of grievances.

The bulk of the Manifesto consists of a list of critiques of the male sex. They are divided into the following sections:

- War
- Niceness, Politeness and "Dignity"
- Money, Marriage and Prostitution, Work and Prevention of an Automated Society
- Fatherhood and Mental Illness (fear, cowardice, timidity, humility, insecurity, passivity)
- Suppression of Individuality, Animalism (domesticity and motherhood) and Functionalism
- Prevention of Privacy
- Isolation, Suburbs and Prevention of Community
- Conformity
- Authority and Government
- Philosophy, Religion and Morality Based on Sex
- Prejudice (racial, ethnic, religious, etc.)
- Competition, Prestige, Status, Formal Education, Ignorance and Social and Economic Classes
- Prevention of Conversation
- Prevention of Friendship and Love
- "Great Art" and "Culture"
- Sexuality
- Boredom
- Secrecy, Censorship, Suppression of Knowledge and Ideas, and Exposés
- Distrust
- Ugliness
- Hate and Violence
- Disease and Death

Due to the aforementioned grievances, the Manifesto concludes that the elimination of the male sex is a moral imperative. It argues that women must replace the "money-work system" with a system of complete automation, as this will lead to the collapse of the government and the loss of men's power over women.

In order to accomplish these goals, the Manifesto proposes that a revolutionary vanguard of women be formed. This vanguard is referred to as SCUM. The Manifesto argues that SCUM should employ sabotage and direct action tactics rather than civil disobedience, as civil disobedience is only useful for making small changes to society. In order to destroy the system, violent action is necessary: "If SCUM ever marches, it will be over the President's stupid, sickening face; if SCUM ever strikes, it will be in the dark with a six-inch blade."

The Manifesto ends by describing a female-dominated utopian future with, eventually, no men. There would be no money, and disease and death would have been eliminated. It argues that any defense of the current system is irrational, and that "rational men" should instead accept the necessity of their destruction.

== Reception ==
Historian Alice Echols writes that members of New York Radical Women knew "next to nothing" about Solanas until her 1968 shooting of Warhol, but that afterward, Solanas's case became a cause célèbre among radical feminists, and SCUM Manifesto became "obligatory reading".

Various critics, scholars, and journalists have analyzed the Manifesto and Solanas's statements regarding it. James Martin Harding said she "propose[d]" a "radical program". Dana Heller said the author had an "anarchic social vision" and the Manifesto had "near-utopian theories" and a "utopian vision of a world in which mechanization and systems of mass (re)production would render work, sexual intercourse, and the money system obsolete."

According to the Village Voice reviewer B. Ruby Rich, "SCUM was an uncompromising global vision" that criticized men for many faults including war and not curing disease; many but not all points were "quite accurate"; some kinds of women were also criticized, subject to women's changing when men are not around; and sex (as in sexuality) was criticized as "exploitative". According to Janet Lyon, the Manifesto "pitt[ed] ... 'liberated' women ... against 'brainwashed' women".

The feminist critic Germaine Greer said that Solanas argued that both genders were separated from their humanity and that men want to be like women. The historian Alice Echols says the Manifesto articulates gender as absolute rather than relative.

Heller argued that the Manifesto shows women's separation from basic economic and cultural resources and, because of psychological subordination to men, women's perpetuation of that separation. (Note: Manifesto is a "strident analysis of women's remove from basic economic and cultural resources, and their unthinking complicity in perpetuating these impoverished circumstances through their psychological subordination to men.") Robert Marmorstein of the Voice said that SCUM's main message included that "men have fouled up the world" and "are no longer necessary (even biologically)". (Note: "[t]he central theme of SCUM is that men have fouled up the world, are no longer necessary (even biologically), and should be completely destroyed, preferably by criminal means such as sabotage and murder .... [t]he quicker, the better.").) According to Laura Winkiel, the Manifesto wants heterosexual capitalism overthrown and the means of production taken over by women. Rich and Jansen said that technology and science would be welcome in the future.

Jansen describes the plan for creating a women's world as mainly nonviolent, as based on women's nonparticipation in the current economy and having nothing to do with any men, thereby overwhelming police and military forces. If solidarity among women was insufficient, some women could take jobs and "unwork", causing systemic collapse; and describes the plan as anticipating that by eliminating money, there would be no further need to kill men. Opposing this Duong states that while the absurdity of what it describes might can cause people to ignore that at its core "the SCUM manifesto endorses feminist violence".

Daily News reporters Frank Faso and Henry Lee, two days after Solanas shot Warhol, said Solanas "crusades for a one-sex world free of men". Winkiel says the Manifesto imagines a violent revolutionary coup by women. (Note: The Manifesto "imagines a ... violent coup"; a "fantas[y] ... of political violence", Solanas's shooting of Andy Warhol also being one of Solanas's "fantasies of political violence"; including as to men a "genocidal political practice"; an "imagined group of vanguard feminist revolutionaries [who] proclaim their takeover of the world"; "a vanguard of revolutionary women"; & "Solanas imagines that women openly declare war on ... men", a declaration that "parodies masculine politics" "SCUM females will take over all aspects of society by ... [inter alia] murder".) Prof. Ginette Castro found the Manifesto was "the feminist charter on violence", supporting terrorist hysteria. According to Jansen, Solanas posited men as animals who will be stalked and killed as prey, the killers using weapons as "phallic symbols turned against men".

Rich, Castro, the reviewer Claire Dederer, Friedan, Debra Diane Davis, Deborah Siegel, Winkiel, Marmorstein, and Greer said that Solanas's plan was largely to eliminate men, including by men murdering each other. Rich thought it might be Swiftian satire and that men's retraining was an alternative in the Manifesto. Castro did not take the elimination of men as serious, and Marmorstein included criminal sabotage of men.

According to Jansen, it called for reproduction only of females, and not even of females once the problems of aging and death were solved so that a next generation would no longer be needed. According to Lyon, the Manifesto is irreverent and witty, according to Siegel the Manifesto "articulated bald female rage" (Note: See also Jansen (2011), pp. 131 ("female rage"), 132 ("profound anger and ... fearless expression of ... [Solanas's] rage"), 134 ("[f]emale anger"), 147 ("downright cold—her anger is icy hot" & "[she is] angry ... but the tone ... is matter-of-fact"), 208 ("fury" & "anger"), & 218 ("incandescent rage burned")) and Jansen says the Manifesto is "shocking" and breathtaking. Rich described Solanas as a "one-woman scorched-earth squad" and Siegel says the stance was "extreme" (Note: The Weathermen, a politically left organization that sought the overthrow of the U.S. government) and "reflected a more general disaffection with nonviolent protest in America overall."

Rich says the Manifesto brought out women's "despair and anger" and advanced feminism. According to Winkiel, radical feminism in the United States emerged because of this "declaration of war against capitalism and patriarchy". Heller suggests the Manifesto is chiefly socialist-materialist. People associated with Warhol and various media saw it as "man-hating".

Echols argues that the misandry displayed in the manifesto was not typical for radical feminists of the time: "Solanas's unabashed misandry—especially her belief in men's biological inferiority—her endorsement of relationships between 'independent women,' and her dismissal of sex as 'the refuge of the mindless' contravened the sort of radical feminism which prevailed in most women's groups across the country."

=== As parody or satire ===
Gender-studies scholar Breanne Fahs writes that SCUM manifesto is simultaneously satirical and serious, representing an absurdist expression of feminist humor. Laura Winkiel, an associate professor of English at the University of Colorado at Boulder, argues that the "SCUM manifesto parodies the performance of patriarchal social order it refuses". Winkiel further suggests that the manifesto is "an illicit performance, a mockery of the 'serious' speech acts of patriarchy". The SCUM women mock the way in which certain men run the world and legitimize their power, Winkiel contends. Similarly, sociologist Ginette Castro states:

If we examine the text more closely, we see that its analysis of patriarchal reality is a parody [...] The content itself is unquestionably a parody of the Freudian theory of femininity, where the word woman is replaced by man [...] All the cliches of Freudian psychoanalytical theory are here: the biological accident, the incomplete sex, "penis envy" which has become "pussy envy," and so forth [...] Here we have a case of absurdity being used as a literary device to expose an absurdity, that is, the absurd theory which has been used to give "scientific" legitimacy to patriarchy [...] What about her proposal that men should quite simply be eliminated, as a way of clearing the dead weight of misogyny and masculinity? This is the inevitable conclusion of the feminist pamphlet, in the same way that Jonathan Swift's proposal that Irish children (as useless mouths) should be fed to the swine was the logical conclusion of his bitter satirical pamphlet protesting famine in Ireland. Neither of the two proposals is meant to be taken seriously, and each belongs to the realm of political fiction, or even science fiction, written in a desperate effort to arouse public consciousness.

The writer Chavisa Woods presents a similar opinion: "The SCUM Manifesto is a masterwork of literary protest art, which is often completely misread. Much of it is actually a point-by-point re-write of multiple of Freud's writings. It is a parody." James Penner reads the manifesto as a satirical text. He states, "Like other feminist satires, the 'SCUM Manifesto' attempts to politicize women by attacking particular masculine myths that are embedded in American popular culture." He adds, "As a work of satire, the 'SCUM Manifesto' is rhetorically effective in that it deconstructs the reader's received notions of masculinity and femininity." (Note: See also Winkiel (1999), pp. 63 ("SCUM's satiric cool"), 66 (on "public performances that are satiric" & "satiric feminism"), 68 (the Manifesto "parod[ies] ... positions of power" & "parodies ... performance of patriarchal social order", its language is "sarcastic" and "street-smart", & internal quotations "parody naturalized meanings"), 70 ("SCUM females ... [may] parody ..."), 73 (her solution "if women took over" is "[i]n the satiric tradition of Jonathan Swift's 'A Modest Proposal ...'", "hyperbol[e]", "parody", & that, outside of the Manifesto, in her shooting of Warhol she "parodied its masculine form"), 74 (outside of the Manifesto, she "pushed to ... parodic proportions ... [a] publicity mania"), 74–75 (the Manifesto "posit[s] ... an ideal vantage of a world run by women from which to satirize the world run by men"), 76 (the Manifesto "renders each ["the categories of 'male' and 'female'"] a mimed, parodic signifier", "parodies" "sexology" & "parodies sexological dscourse", "renegade insults and urgent calls for immediate change underscore SCUM's illegitimacy"), 77 ("her rhetoric ... parodies ... authorizing language"), 78 ("parody of sexology" & "imagined SCUM females .... rendering themselves parodic ... and artificial") and 79 ("satire of men"))

The English professor Carl Singleton notes the "outrageous nature" of the manifesto and Solanas's increasing mental instability, which, he argues, led many people to trivialize the text. Singleton adds, "Others saw the document as a form of political satire in the style of Jonathan Swift's A Modest Proposal." Similarly, Jansen compared it to A Modest Proposal, describing it as having "satiric brilliance" and calling Solanas "cool and mordantly funny". The Bulletin of the Project for Transnational Cultural Studies echoes the comparison to Jonathan Swift, stating, "A more common strategy is to read SCUM as an instance of political fiction or parody in the vein of Jonathan Swift."

Writing for Spin in September 1996, Charles Aaron calls the SCUM Manifesto a "riotous, pre-feminist satire". The film director Mary Harron called the manifesto a "brilliant satire" and described its tone as "very funny". (Note: "Eine brillante Satire – so als hätte Oscar Wilde beschlossen, Terrorist zu werden. Für meinen Warhol-Film hatte ich Dutzende von Zeitzeugen zu den Hintergründen von Solanas Attentat befragt und Berge von Berichten gelesen. Niemand hatte erwähnt, dass Valerie Solanas Talent und einen ausgeprägten Hang zur Komik hatte.") According to Rich of The Village Voice, the work possibly was "satire" and could be read as "literal or symbolic". Winkiel said, "The humor and anger of satire invites women to produce this feminist script by taking on the roles of the politically performative SCUM females." Paul Krassner, who was a personal acquaintance of Solanas, called the manifesto a "dittoed document of pathological proselytization with occasional overtones of unintentional satire".

Girodias thought of it as "a joke" and described the manifesto, according to J. Hoberman, as "a Swiftian satire on the depraved behavior, genetic inferiority, and ultimate disposability of the male gender".

According to a 1968 article in the Daily News, "those who profess to know Valerie say she isn't joking ... [but] that deep down she likes men." In 1968, speaking to Marmorstein, she characterized herself on the "'SCUM thing'" as "'dead serious.'"

== SCUM organization ==
Solanas organized "a public forum on SCUM" at which about 40 people, mostly men she characterized as "creeps" and "masochists", showed up. SCUM had no members besides her. According to Greer, "little evidence [existed] that S.C.U.M. ever functioned" other than as Solanas.

In a 1977 interview for The Village Voice, Solanas stated that SCUM was "just a literary device. There's no organization called SCUM—there never was, and there never will be." Solanas said that she "thought of it as a state of mind .... [in that] women who think a certain way are in SCUM .... [and] [m]en who think a certain way are in the men's auxiliary of SCUM."

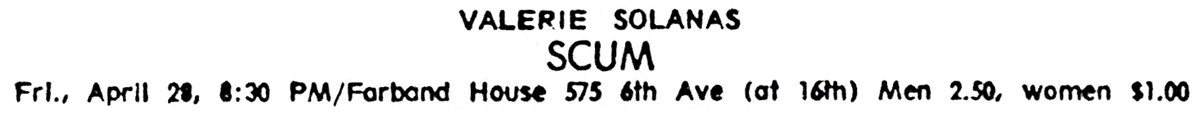
An ad placed by Solanas in The Village Voice, April 27, 1967

== SCUM as acronym ==
The phrase "Society for Cutting Up Men" is on the cover of the 1967 self-published edition, after the title. This edition precedes all commercial editions. Additionally, in the August 10, 1967, issue of The Village Voice, a letter to the editor appears that was signed by a Valerie Solanas (of SCUM, West 23rd Street) that responds to a previous letter signed by a Ruth Herschberger (published in the August 3, 1967, issue) that asks why women do not rebel against men. Solanas's response reads: "I would like to inform her and other proud, independent, females like her of the existence of SCUM (Society for Cutting Up Men), a recently conceived organization which will be getting into high gear (and I mean high) within a few weeks."

Although "SCUM" originally stood for "Society for Cutting Up Men", this phrase actually occurs nowhere in the text. Heller argued that "there is no reliable evidence that Solanas intended SCUM to stand as an acronym for 'Society for Cutting Up Men'." Susan Ware et al. state that it was Solanas's publisher Girodias who claimed that SCUM was an acronym for "Society for Cutting Up Men", something Solanas never seems to have intended. Gary Dexter contends that Solanas called it the SCUM Manifesto without periods after the letters of SCUM. Dexter adds: "The spelling out of her coded title by Girodias was one more act of patriarchal intervention, an attempt to possess." (Note: "She called it the SCUM Manifesto, with the acronym not spelled out, and with no full stops after the letters of SCUM. This was the title used for all subsequent editions. In fact, even in earlier versions of the book, 'Society for Cutting Up Men' had not been mentioned anywhere in the text (...) SCUM was the voice of those women, like Valerie, an enraged, impoverished loner-lesbian, outside any group or any society, who were the rejected, the dregs, the refuse, the outcast. The scum, in fact. The spelling out of her coded title by Girodias was one more act of patriarchal intervention, an attempt to possess.")

The word "SCUM" is used in the text in reference to a certain type of women, not to men. It refers to empowered women, "SCUM - dominant, secure, self-confident, nasty, violent, selfish, independent, proud, thrill-seeking, free-wheeling, arrogant females, who consider themselves fit to rule the universe, who have free-wheeled to the limits of this 'society' and are ready to wheel on to something far beyond what it has to offer". According to feminist philosopher Avital Ronell, that "SCUM" was intended as an acronym was a "belated add-on", which Solanas later rejected. (Note: Ronell writes in the introduction to the 2016 edition of SCUM Manifesto, "There were moments when [Solanas] disclaimed the acronymization of her title, refuting that it stood for 'Society for the Cutting Up of Men'. A mere 'literary device' and belated add-on, the gloss on SCUM permitted the title to pass into other languages with annihilating precision: Manifest der Gesellschaft zur Vernichtung der Männer (1969), Manifesto de la Organización para el Extermino del Hombre (1977), Manifesto per l'eliminzione dei masch (1994), and whatever it says to the same effect in Czech (1998).")

== Influence ==
The Manifesto, according to Lyon, is "notorious and influential" and was "one of the earliest ... [and] one of the most radical" tracts produced by "various strands of the American women's liberation movement". Lyon said that "by 1969 it had become a kind of bible" for Cell 16, in Boston. According to a 2012 article by Arthur Goldwag on the Southern Poverty Law Center Hatewatch blog, "Solanas continues to be much-read and quoted in some feminist circles." Whether the Manifesto should be considered a feminist classic is challenged by Heller because the Manifesto rejected a hierarchy of greatness, but she said it "remains an influential feminist text."

=== Women and shooting ===
Laura Winkiel argues that Solanas's shooting of Andy Warhol and Mario Amaya was directly tied to the Manifesto. (Note: See also Hoberman (2003), p. 49: "Valerie Solanas really was a nobody until she shot Andy Warhol. But once The SCUM Manifesto was underlined in blood, Solanas hardly had to wait for admirers.... Solanas was claimed as an 'important spokeswoman' by the radical wing of NOW ....") (Note: See also Siegel (2007), p. 2: "Valerie Solanas, author of the man-hating tract known as the S.C.U.M. (Society for Cutting Up Men) Manifesto, shot Andy Warhol.... [¶] To women of the Baby Boomer generation, th[is and other] ... opening salvos of a revolution are moments of canonical—and personal—feminist history." & Siegel (2007), pp. 71–72: "Solanas's supporters argued that the shooting of a prominent male avant-garde figure was a bold political statement offered in the name of women's liberation".) After shooting Warhol, Solanas told a reporter, "Read my manifesto and it will tell you what I am." Heller, however, states that Solanas "intended no connection between the manifesto and the shooting". Harding suggests that "there is no clear indication in Solanas' ambiguous statement to reporters that the contents of the manifesto would explain the specifics of her actions, at least not in the sense of providing a script for them." Harding views the SCUM Manifesto as an "extension, not the source, of performative acts, even a violent one act like the shooting of Warhol."

Winkiel argues that the revolutionary Roxanne Dunbar moved to the U.S. "convinced that a women's revolution had begun", forming Cell 16 with a program based on the Manifesto. According to Winkiel, although Solanas was "outraged" at the women's movement's "appropriat[ion]" of the Manifesto, "the shooting [of Warhol] represented the feminist movement's righteous rage against patriarchy".

Dunbar and Ti-Grace Atkinson considered the Manifesto as having initiated a "revolutionary movement". Atkinson (according to Rich) called Solanas the "'first outstanding champion of women's rights'" and probably (according to Greer) having been "radicalized" by the language of the Manifesto to leave the National Organization for Women (NOW), and (according to Winkiel) women organized in support of Solanas.

Solanas was viewed as too mentally ill and too bound up with Warhol, according to Greer, "for her message to come across unperverted." According to Prof. Davis, the Manifesto was a "forerunner" as a "call to arms among pragmatic American feminists" and was "enjoy[ing] ... wide contemporary appeal". According to Winkiel, the Manifesto "was ... influential in the spread of 'womansculture' and lesbian separatism" and is also "credited with beginning the antipornography movement." (Note: Anti-pornography movement, a movement opposed to pornography on feminist and other grounds) Friedan opposed the Manifesto as bad for the feminist movement and NOW.

=== Film ===
Scum Manifesto was adapted into a 1976 short film directed by Carole Roussopoulos and Delphine Seyrig. In the film, Seyrig reads several passages from a French translation of Solanas's manifesto. The film was necessary because the French translation of the manifesto sold out quickly and there was a clamor for more copies.

Warhol later satirized the whole event in a subsequent film, Women in Revolt, calling a group similar to Solanas's S.C.U.M., "P.I.G." (Politically Involved Girlies).

Solanas's creative work and relationship with Warhol is depicted in the 1996 film I Shot Andy Warhol, a significant portion of which relates to the SCUM Manifesto, and Solanas's disputes on notions of authorship with Warhol.

=== Television ===
"Viva Los Muertos!", an episode of the animated comedy TV series The Venture Bros., features a character named Val who directly quotes the SCUM Manifesto throughout the episode.

The SCUM manifesto was presented as a plot device in the FX television series American Horror Story: Cult, first seen in the episode "Valerie Solanas Died for Your Sins: Scumbag", which first aired on October 17, 2017. A fictionalized version of Valerie Solanas, played by the actress Lena Dunham, recited the manifesto throughout the episode.

=== Literature ===
The title story of the Michael Blumlein short story collection, The Brains of Rats, employs the Manifesto to illustrate the male protagonist's hatred of himself and his gender.

In 2006 the Swedish author Sara Stridsberg published a semi-fictional biography of Valerie Solanas, Drömfakulteten (The Dream Faculty), in which the Manifesto is referred to on several occasions. Parts of the Manifesto are also cited in the book.

Nick Cave said that Solanas in the Manifesto "talks at length about what she considers maleness and the male psyche ... basically men being halfway between humans and apes, these kind of lumbering lumps of meat, predatory lumps of meat", and that "its quite wonderful to read .... [and] [t]here was an aspect of that I felt rang true." Cave wrote a novel, The Death of Bunny Munro, for which he "invented a character that was Valerie Solanas's male incarnate."

=== Music ===
Solanas is quoted in the sleeve notes of the Manic Street Preachers debut album Generation Terrorists. Solanas directly inspired the Manic Street Preachers song "Of Walking Abortion" from their third album The Holy Bible, with the song title being taken from Solanas's work. Liverpool punk band Big in Japan composed the song "Society for Cutting Up Men" directly inspired by the manifesto.

The Italian progressive rock band Area - International POPular Group devoted a song to Solanas's manifesto, called SCUM, which appears in their fifth album Maledetti (Maudits). The British band S.C.U.M. was named after the manifesto. On American electronic duo Matmos' 2006 album The Rose Has Teeth in the Mouth of a Beast, the track "Tract for Valerie Solanas" features excerpts from the SCUM Manifesto. The British alternative band Young Knives released a song called "Society for Cutting Up Men" in December 2017.

=== Theatre ===
Alice Birch's 2014 feminist play Revolt. She Said. Revolt Again. was inspired by the SCUM Manifesto.

== See also ==
- Feminist science fiction
- Radical feminism
- Reverse sexism
- Separatist feminism
- Critique of work
