= Up Your Ass =

Up Your Ass may refer to:

- Up Your Ass (play), a 1965 play by Valerie Solanas
- a colloquial translation of Tilhas Tizi Gesheften, a group of Jewish Brigade members formed immediately following World War II
