= I, a Man =

1967 film by Andy Warhol and Paul Morrissey

- Directed by: Paul Morrissey; Andy Warhol
- Starring: Nico; Tom Baker; Valerie Solanas; Ingrid Superstar; Ultra Violet
- Release date: August 24, 1967
- Running time: 99 minutes
- Country: United States
- Language: English

I, a Man is a 1967 American erotic melodrama directed by Andy Warhol. The film stars Tom Baker and features radical feminist Valerie Solanas, who attempted to assassinate Warhol in 1968.

== Plot ==
The film follows Tom (Tom Baker) as he encounters, talks to, fights with, or has sex with six different women across New York City in a single day.

== Cast ==
The cast featured several of Warhol Superstars from his studio The Factory:

- Tom Baker as Tom
- Cynthia May as Girl in Kitchen
- Ivy Nicholson as Girl with TV
- Ingrid Superstar as Girl on Table
- Stephanie Graves as Girl in Penthouse
- Valerie Solanas as Girl on Staircase
- Bettina Coffin as Married Girl
- Ultra Violet
- Nico

== Production ==
Warhol reportedly created the movie as a response to the popular erotic Scandinavian film I, a Woman, which had opened in the United States in October 1966.

Warhol cast Valerie Solanas in the film for $25, partly as compensation for a play she had given him titled Up Your Ass, which he had lost. In 1967, Warhol told the San Francisco Chronicle that Solanas headed a "very interesting" organization called the SCUM (Society for Cutting Up Men). "She believes in destroying all men," he said, adding, "I don't believe in her organization." The following year, Solanas attempted to assassinate Warhol by shooting him at the Factory.

According to a 2004 biography of Jim Morrison, Morrison agreed to appear in the film opposite Nico but later withdrew, sending his friend Tom Baker to take his place.

== Release ==
I, a Man opened at the Hudson Theatre in New York City on August 25, 1967. The uncut reels were also included in Warhol's 25 hour film **** (Four Stars) in 1967.

== Critical reception ==
Roger Ebert of the Chicago Sun Times wrote the film was "not dirty, or even funny, or even anything but a very long and pointless home movie", and described it as "an elaborate, deliberately boring joke". Howard Thompson of the New York Times wrote: "The nudity is no match for the bareness of the dialogue's drivel and the dogged tone of waste and ennui that pervade the entire film".

== See also ==
- Andy Warhol filmography
- List of American films of 1967
- New Andy Warhol Garrick Theatre
