= Tom Baker (American actor) =

American actor (1940–1982)

- Born: August 23, 1940; West Virginia, U.S.
- Died: September 2, 1982 (aged 42); New York City, U.S.
- Occupation: Actor

Tom Baker (August 23, 1940 – September 2, 1982) was an American actor who starred in the Andy Warhol film I, a Man (1967). He was a close friend of Jim Morrison of The Doors.

== Early life ==
Baker was the son of Tom Baker Jr. and Ellie, military parents who retired in San Francisco. His older sister married and then divorced a well-known British Formula 1 racer. He was of Irish descent.

== Career ==
Baker started his career as a stage actor in New York City and assisted Norman Mailer in the stage adaptation of Mailer's novel The Deer Park. Once he moved to Hollywood, he acted in a series of B movies. He also continued to do stage work, directing the 1973 premiere of The Grabbing of the Fairy, a masque by Michael McClure.

He produced and directed his own film, Bongo Wolf's Revenge in 1970. The cast included Severn Darden and P. J. Proby. A number of people from Jim Morrison's circle of friends worked on the production including Paul Ferrara, Babe Hill and Frank Lisciandro and music was provided by Mike Bloomfield and The Doors. Andy Warhol cast Baker in one of his films, I, A Man (reportedly as a replacement for Morrison, who dropped out) and one of his co-stars was Valerie Solanas, who later shot Warhol in his office at The Factory.

=== Relationship with Jim Morrison ===
The relationship he had with Morrison and Morrison's long-term girlfriend Pamela Courson was described in a memoir, Blue Centre Light, and an extract was published in High Times in June 1981. The stormy friendship between the three of them is depicted in the stage play The Lizard King, written by Jay Jeff Jones, which was produced in Los Angeles in 1991. Clay Wilcox took the role of Baker and Jim Morrison was played by Stephen Nichols.

In November 1969, Morrison found himself in trouble with the law after harassing airline staff during a flight to Phoenix, Arizona to see The Rolling Stones in concert. Both he and fellow traveler Baker were charged with "interfering with the flight of an intercontinental aircraft and public drunkenness".

== Death ==
Tom Baker died of a drug overdose in 1982 in New York City, in the loft on 14th Street which he shared with friend and actor Bob Brady who starred in Liquid Sky. His death caused confusion in the media. British actor Tom Baker was more well-known at the time, due to his portrayal of the Doctor on the BBC programme Doctor Who, and was also a heavy drinker at that time. Some publications mistakenly reported that the British actor had died.

== Fictional portrayals ==
Baker is portrayed by actor Michael Madsen in the Oliver Stone film The Doors (1991). He is portrayed by Bill Sage in the film about Valerie Solanas, I Shot Andy Warhol (1996).

Author and singer Kinky Friedman dedicated his novel Elvis, Jesus & Coca-Cola to Baker, who had been his friend, and the plot of the book features Baker's wake.

== Filmography ==
Year	Title	Role	Notes
1966	Hallucination Generation	Denny	
1967	I, A Man	Tom	
1968	Beyond the Law	Irish	
1969	Amore e rabbia		(segment "L'indifferenza")
1970	Angels Die Hard	Blair	
1970	Ghetto Freaks	Cleaver	
1971	The Last Movie	Member of Billy's Gang	
1972	Runaway, Runaway	Buddy	
1973	The Young Nurses	Floyd	
1974	Candy Stripe Nurses	First Mechanic	
1976	Two-Minute Warning	Stakowski (SWAT Team)	
1977	Rollercoaster	Federal Agent #2	
1978	American Hot Wax	Vinnie - Promo Man	
1978	Loose Shoes	Billy Jerk	
1979	Fyre	Nick Perrine	
1979	More American Graffiti	Cop #1	
1980	Wholly Moses!	Egyptian Captain	(final film role)
