= Angels Die Hard =

- Theatrical release poster
- Directed by: Richard Compton
- Screenplay by: Richard Compton
- Produced by: Charles Beach Dickerson
- Starring: Tom Baker; William Smith; R. G. Armstrong; Alan DeWitt; Gary Littlejohn; Rita Murray; Carl Steppling; Connie Nelson
- Music by: Richard Hieronymus
- Distributed by: New World Pictures
- Release date: July 8, 1970
- Running time: 86 minutes
- Country: United States
- Language: English
- Budget: $125,000
- Box office: $700,000 (rentals)

Angels Die Hard is a 1970 biker film directed by Richard Compton and starring Tom Baker and William Smith. It is the first film distributed by New World Pictures; half its budget was provided by Roger Corman.

The film—which was written in three months—revolves around a gang of bikers who try to save people from a mining accident. Compton shot the film on location in Kernville, California, on the shore of Lake Isabella, an old gold-mining town that was used for filming early Hollywood Westerns.

== Cast ==
- Tom Baker as Blair
- William Smith as Tim
- Carl Steppling as Sheriff
- Alan DeWitt as Undertaker
- Gary Littlejohn as Piston
- Beach Dickerson as Shank
- Rita Murray as Naomi
- R. G. Armstrong as Mel
- Connie Nelson as Nancy
- Dan Haggerty as Bearded Biker

== Production ==
Barbara Peeters worked on the film.

== Home media ==
Thunderbean released a Blu-ray of the film on February 7, 2019.
