= Fred Jordan (publisher) =

American book editor (1925–2021)

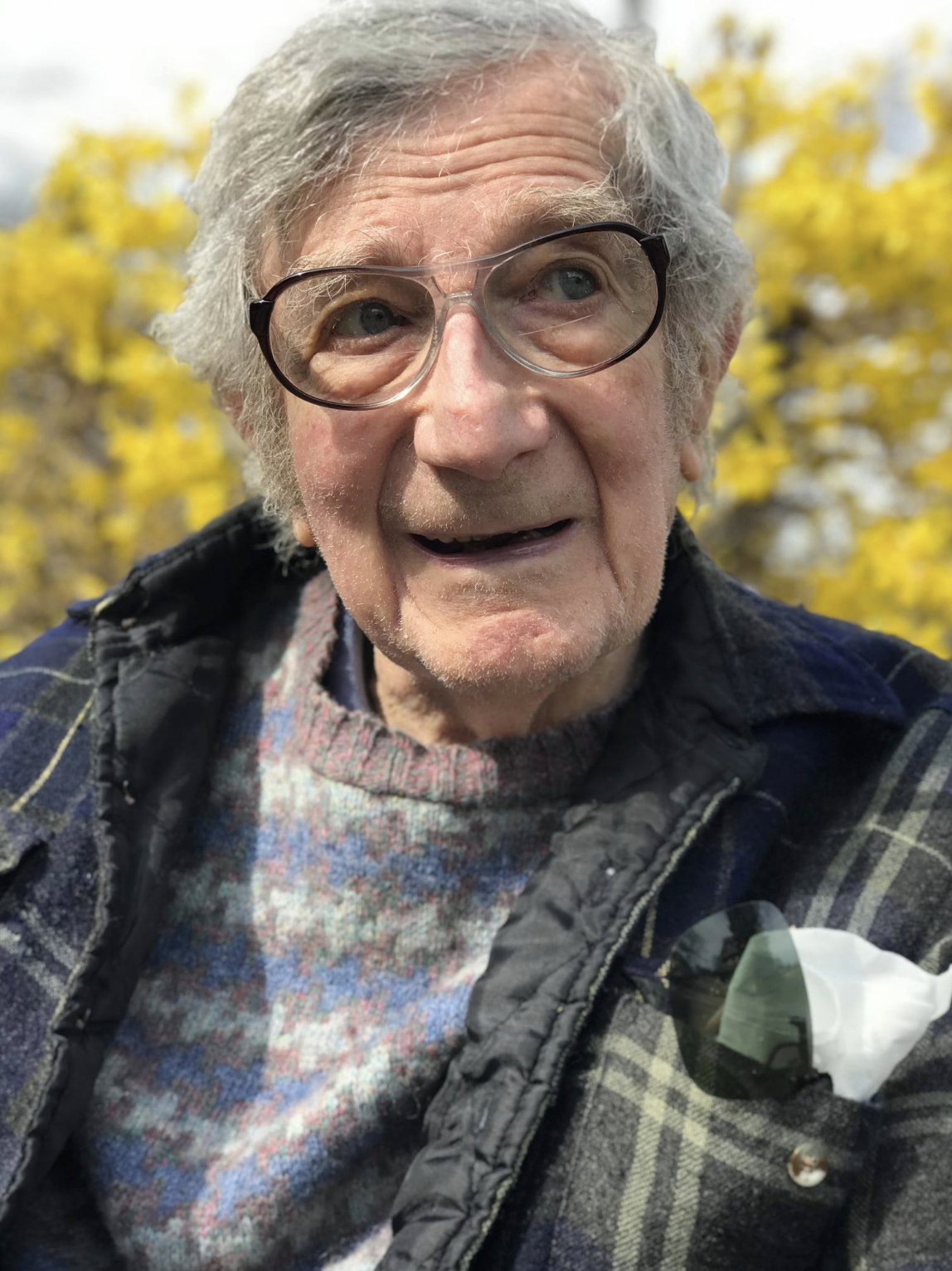
- Fred Jordan outside of his home in Brooklyn, NY
- Born: Alfred Rotblatt; November 9, 1925; Vienna, Austria
- Died: April 19, 2021 (aged 95); Brooklyn, New York City, New York, United States
- Occupations: Book, magazine publisher
- Spouse: Helen Manson
- Children: 2

Fred Jordan (born Alfred Rotblatt; November 9, 1925 – April 19, 2021) was the business manager of the publishing house Grove Press and business manager and editor of the magazine Evergreen Review. He managed Grove's legal battles to publish uncensored versions of D. H. Lawrence's novel Lady Chatterley's Lover, Henry Miller's novel Tropic of Cancer, William S. Burroughs' novel Naked Lunch, and the Swedish film I Am Curious (Yellow).

== Early life ==
Alfred Rotblatt (known as Fred) was born on November 9, 1925, in Vienna, Austria. His father was Herman Rotblatt, a Polish Jew, and his mother Fanny (née Steckel) was a Viennese whose parents were Jewish immigrants from the Russian Empire.

Austria was annexed by Nazi Germany in the Anschluss on March 12, 1938. Fred's bar mitzvah was to have occurred on November 9, 1938, but the Kristallnacht attacks on Jewish businesses began that day and it was never held. Fred's father was later smuggled out of Austria and spent World War II hiding in a church in Belgium, while his mother was murdered in the Chełmno extermination camp. Fred was taken out of Austria as part of the Kindertransport, and spent the war in the United Kingdom.

Initially, Jordan worked for a group of Austrian Jewish émigrés, booking entertainment for the group's meetings. Speaking only German, Jordan swiftly learned English. Leaving school after the seventh grade, he worked in a paper mill and then enlisted in the British Army when he turned 18, serving in the Glasgow Highlanders.

== Career ==
Jordan returned to Vienna when World War II ended. He found employment working for a U.S. armed forces newspaper.

Jordan emigrated to the United States in 1949. He worked at various jobs in the Midwest and West Coast for the next few years. He got a job in 1953 as an assistant to publisher Charles Musès, who worked for Falcon's Wing Press. and then worked for a publishing industry trade newspaper in New York City.

=== Grove Press ===
In 1956, Barney Rosset, owner of Grove Press, hired Jordan as the publishing house's business manager. Jordan went to Rosset's home for an interview. Rosset waved away his résumé, leaving Jordan angry. Jordan told him that Rosset might be taking a risk on him, but that Jordan was taking a bigger risk working for Grove. Rosset said, "We'll see what happens" and then told Jordan he was off to Europe. Grove Press historian Loren Glass wrote, "Jordan shared Rosset's left-wing political sympathies and became deeply dedicated to realizing his vision for the press."

Jordan initially oversaw marketing and sales. Being a native speaker of German, he also read books written in German for potential publication by Grove Press. Jordan almost single-handedly created Grove's interest in Austrian, German, and Swiss literature, and he alone shaped Grove's German-language publishing list. Jordan was responsible for recommending that Grove publish Rolf Hochhuth's 1963 play, The Deputy, which criticized Pope Pius XII's actions during the Holocaust in World War II. Jordan also discovered Dr. Eric Berne's 1961 book Transactional Analysis in Psychotherapy. Although it sold only a few hundred copies, Jordan convinced Rosset to publish Berne's follow-up, Games People Play: The Psychology of Human Relationships. To help sell the book, Jordan had Grove Press partner with Doubleday's bookstore in Manhattan to run a joint ad in The New York Times while the annual convention of the American Psychiatric Association was in town. Jordan's text for Grove's part of the ad was an open letter to young psychiatrists, telling them to read the book. Sales for Games People Play soared, and by the end of 1970 Grove had sold 600,000 hardback copies.

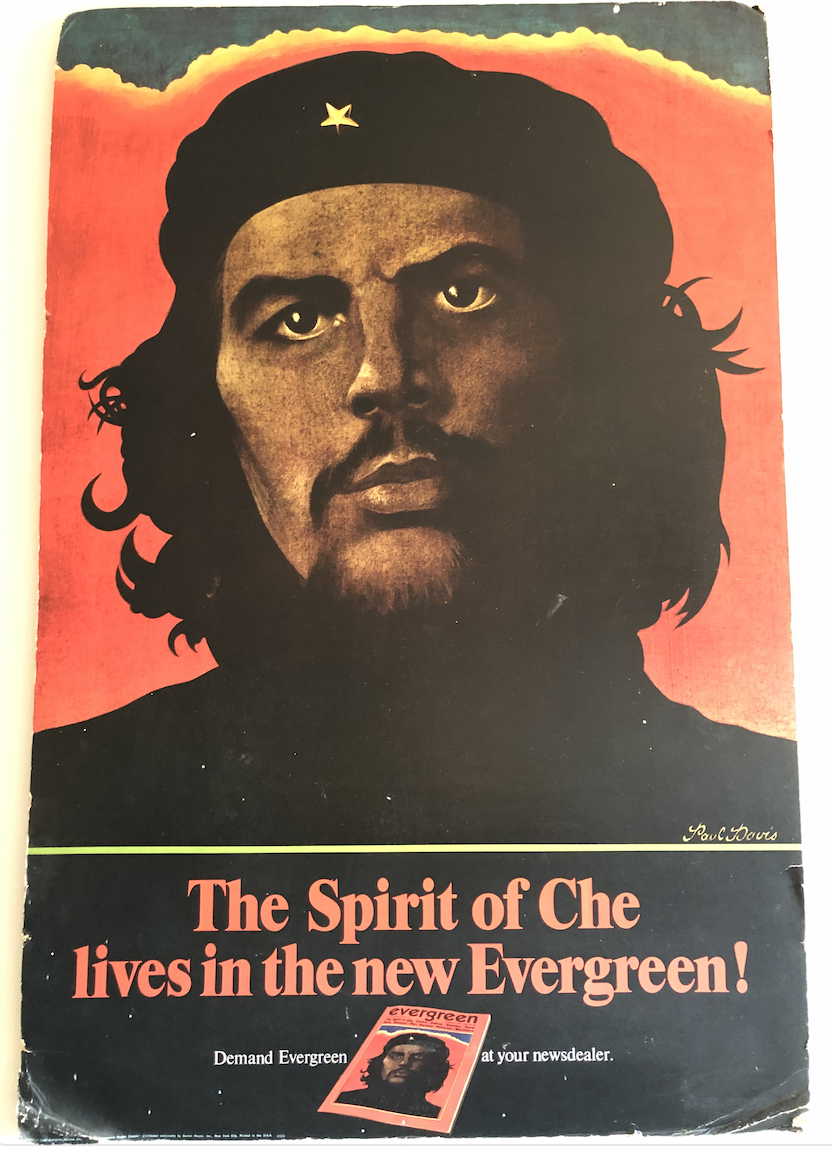
Fred went to Bolivia to retrieve Che Guevara's diaries and published them in the Evergreen Review. He commissioned the image from designer Paul Davis.

Over the next 30 years, Jordan took on additional roles as an editor and supervisor of the numerous First Amendment lawsuits which Grove launched. When Rosset hired Richard Seaver in 1959 as managing editor, Jordan was named editor. Some of the legal cases overseen by Jordan include those for the novels Lady Chatterley's Lover, Tropic of Cancer, and Naked Lunch, and for the film I Am Curious (Yellow). (Note: Early in his life, Rosset had tried his hand at filmmaking and failed. He retained an intense interest in film, however. Grove Press purchased the American distribution rights to I Am Curious (Yellow), and had to sue in several states to overcome obscenity rulings.) When Rosset founded the magazine Evergreen Review in 1957, Jordan became its business manager as well. He was also an editor of Evergreen Review from issue 21 until issue 96 (its last). In 1968, Jordan commissioned a painting of Che Guevara to accompany the magazine's publication of an edited version of Guevara's diaries. The painting by Paul Brooks Davis became a pop culture sensation and was widely reproduced.

== Post-Grove career ==
Jordan joined Grosset & Dunlap in 1977 and established their imprint, Fred Jordan Books. He left in 1979 to become president and publisher of the American division of Methuen Publishing. He stepped down in May 1981, although he continued to serve as a director of the company.

In the early 1980s, Grove Press was in deep financial straits. Jordan returned to the publishing house to try to save it, but it was sold in 1985. He remained an editor at Grove until 1990, and was its longest-serving editor while it remained independent.

After leaving Grove Press, Jordan took over as publisher and editor-in-chief of Pantheon Books, a division of Random House. He retired in 1993.

== Personal life and death ==
Fred Jordan married Helen Manson in 1951, and the couple had two children.

Jordan died on April 19, 2021, in a hospice in Brooklyn, New York.

== Bibliography ==
- Glass, Loren (2018). Rebel Publisher: Grove Press and the Revolution of the Word. New York: Seven Stories Press. ISBN 9781609808228.
- Silverman, Al (2008). The Time of Their Lives: The Golden Age of Great American Book Publishers, Their Editors, and Authors. New York: Truman Talley Books. ISBN 9780312350031.
- van Gageldonk, Maarten (2019). "Close Connections: Grove Press, Evergreen Review and German-Language Literature, 1957-1965". In Bak, Hans; Mansanti, Céline (eds.). Transatlantic Intellectual Networks, 1914-1964. Newcastle upon Tyne: Cambridge Scholars Publishing. ISBN 9781527539747.
