= George Coates =

American theater director

- Born: March 19, 1952 (age 74); Philadelphia, Pennsylvania
- Occupations: Theater producer and director
- Known for: George Coates Performance Works
- Notable work: Up Your A$$, Actual Sho
- Style: Multimedia live theater
- Partner: Colleen Larkin (1974-1988, m. 1988-present)
- Children: Grace Coates

George Coates (born March 19, 1952) is an American theater director most notable for his work with George Coates Performance Works (GCPW), which he founded in 1977 in San Francisco, CA. The company produced over 20 multi-media live performances over a span of 25 years, winning a multitude of awards for its international performances, earning critical acclaim in Asia, Europe and South America and gaining North American attention at Brooklyn Academy of Music's Next Wave Festival. In the 1990s, he was the first to merge live performers within stage environments created by computer generated graphics in real time live theater. Coates became known as a pioneer of experimental live theater using stereographic projections and 3-D glasses populated by live actors and musicians.

== Early life ==
George Coates was born in Philadelphia in 1952 and spent his childhood in New Jersey and later Rhode Island. His father was an Irish Catholic rotogravure operator at the Providence Journal. In 1969, at the age of 17, Coates hitched a ride to California and eventually settled in Berkeley.

Coates auditioned for and was cast in numerous productions at the University of California, Berkeley theater department as an unregistered student. He then traveled to New York where he signed a year contract with the National Shakespeare Company, touring the country in character roles in "As You Like It," "Julius Caesar" and George Bernard Shaw's "St. Joan."

When the contract ended, Coates returned to Berkeley, where he joined the Berkeley Stage Company and later the experimental theater group the Blake Street Hawkeyes, where he became fascinated by improvisation and the ensemble.

== Early work ==
In 1976, Coates began creating original works with performers including movement artists, opera and gospel singers presented non-traditional formats in a theatrical context. His first major piece, 2019 Blake, was the story of a performer who can't keep a linear train of thought, performed by mime Leonard Pitt with a few props. His next one-man show, Duykers The First, featured operatic tenor John Duykers. The Way of How, performed at Brooklyn Academy of Music's Next Wave Festival in 1983, included the same performers, operatic tenor Rinde Eckhert, and a real time analog sound processing system invented by composer Paul Dresher that created the sound of an ensemble playing when a performer laid down multiple tracks on a tape loop.

== Notable work ==
Coates' Rare Area was seen by 35,000 people in a sold-out, three-month run at San Francisco's Theater Artaud and in a one-month series at the Museum of Modern Arts' Herbst Theater.

Commissioned in 1986 by William Cook and "American Inroads" for their San Francisco New Performance Festival, Actual Sho was created through eight months of improvisation, utilized an original design of a tilting, rolling stage. Actual Sho premiered in Stuttgart, West Germany on June 25, 1987 before its inclusion in the 1987 New Performance Festival. It was performed in Yugoslavia, Poland, the Kennedy Center's San Francisco Festival in Washington, D.C., the Pepsico Summerfare Festival in Purchase, NY, the BITEF Festival in Belgrade and Herbst Theater in San Francisco. The virtuoso improvisational vocalist, singer/songwriter, actor and writer Diana Rosalind Trimble was one of the stand out performers in 'Actual Sho', then a teenager, who also recorded original music with the production's composer Mark Ream and went on to have a prolific independent career in music.

Coates collaborated with Steve Jobs in 1988 to create a multimedia production for the unveiling of Jobs' NeXT Computer System and was featured for this production in the 2015 film, Steve Jobs, directed by Danny Boyle and written by Aaron Sorkin.

Coates' Right Mind opened the American Conservatory Theater's 1989–1990 season. It was brought to a close October 17, 1989, when the Loma Prieta earthquake caused extensive damage to the landmark Geary Theater, with the set for Right Mind on stage.

A year to the day after the earthquake, Coates’ show Architecture of Catastrophic Change opened in his new theater, a renovated neo-gothic cathedral at 110 McAllister St. in San Francisco.

In 1999, Coates became the first to acquire the rights to Valerie Solanas' long-lost work Up Your Ass, which had been lost by Andy Warhol (for which Solanas shot him) and discovered at the Andy Warhol Museum thirty years later. The production, which was retitled Up Your A$$ by Coates and made its world premiere in 2000 at his San Francisco theater, was regarded one of the raunchiest and most controversial shows around, with an all-female cast, many of which were dressed in drag. The play was mounted on alternate nights with a production of Arthur Miller's The Archbishop's Ceiling, for which Coates had received funding from National Endowment for the Arts, to make a production examining censorship. Coates' production of the Miller play incorporated gender bending by including five of the performers from Up Your A$$, some in drag, some not. Up Your A$$ later premiered in New York at PS 122.

== Recent Activity ==
From 2004 to 2011, Coates ran an online video blog, Better Bad News, a scripted video series with a cast of performers. He has hosted Twit Wit Radio, a weekly political satire program with a cast of actors, on Pacifica Radio, KPFA 94.1 FM, since 2011.

== Influences ==
George Coates cited the participatory scientific displays of Frank Oppenheimer as a major influence. The brother of Robert J. Oppenheimer, Frank founded the Exploratorium, San Francisco's hands-on, interactive people's science museum.

== Selected Productions ==
- 2001, Crazy Wisdom (Performance Works, San Francisco, CA)
- 2000, Up Your A$$ (Performance Space 122, New York, NY)
- 1999, Triangulated Nation (Performance Works, San Francisco, CA)
- 1998, Blind Messengers (Golden State Archives Museum Sacramento, CA)
- 1998, Wittgenstein : On Mars (Performance Works, San Francisco, CA)
- 1997, 20/20 Blake: The Visions of William Blake (Theater Festival, São Paulo, Brazil)
- 1997, Twisted Pairs (Performance Works, San Francisco, CA)
- 1995, The Bandwidth Addict (Performance Works, San Francisco, CA)
- 1994, Nowhere NowHere (Artsphere Theatre, Tokyo, Japan)
- 1993, Box Conspiracy (Spoleto Festival, Charleston, SC)
- 1992, The Desert Music: A Live Sho (Performance Works, San Francisco, CA)
- 1991, Invisible Site: A Virtual Sho (SIGGRAPH '91, Las Vegas, NV)
- 1990–91, The Architecture of Catastrophic Change (Performance Works, San Francisco, CA)
- 1989, Right Mind (American Conservatory Theater, San Francisco, CA)
- 1987, Actual Sho (Theatre Der Welt, Stuttgart, Germany; Pepsico Summerfare SUNY Purchase, NY; Kennedy Center Opera House, Washington, DC)
- 1985–86, RARE AREA (Kaai Festival, Brussels, Belgium)
- 1983, Seehear (American Music Theatre Festival, Philadelphia, PA)
- 1982, Are/Are (Theatre Artaud, San Francisco, CA)
- 1981–82, The Way of How (Brooklyn Academy of Music Next Wave Festival, New York, NY; Lift Festival, London, UK; Walker Arts Center, Minneapolis, MN)
- 1979–1980, Duykers the First (Kaai Festival of International Theater, Brussels, Belgium; Festival Carrefour, Lille, France; Mickery Theater, Amsterdam, Netherlands; Festival Bordeaux, Bordeaux, France)
- 1977, 2019 Blake (International New Theatre Festival, Baltimore, MD; International Creative Workshop of Mime, Wroclaw, Poland)
- 1976, Dropouts (Berkeley Stage Company, Berkeley, CA)
