= Alice Echols =

American historian

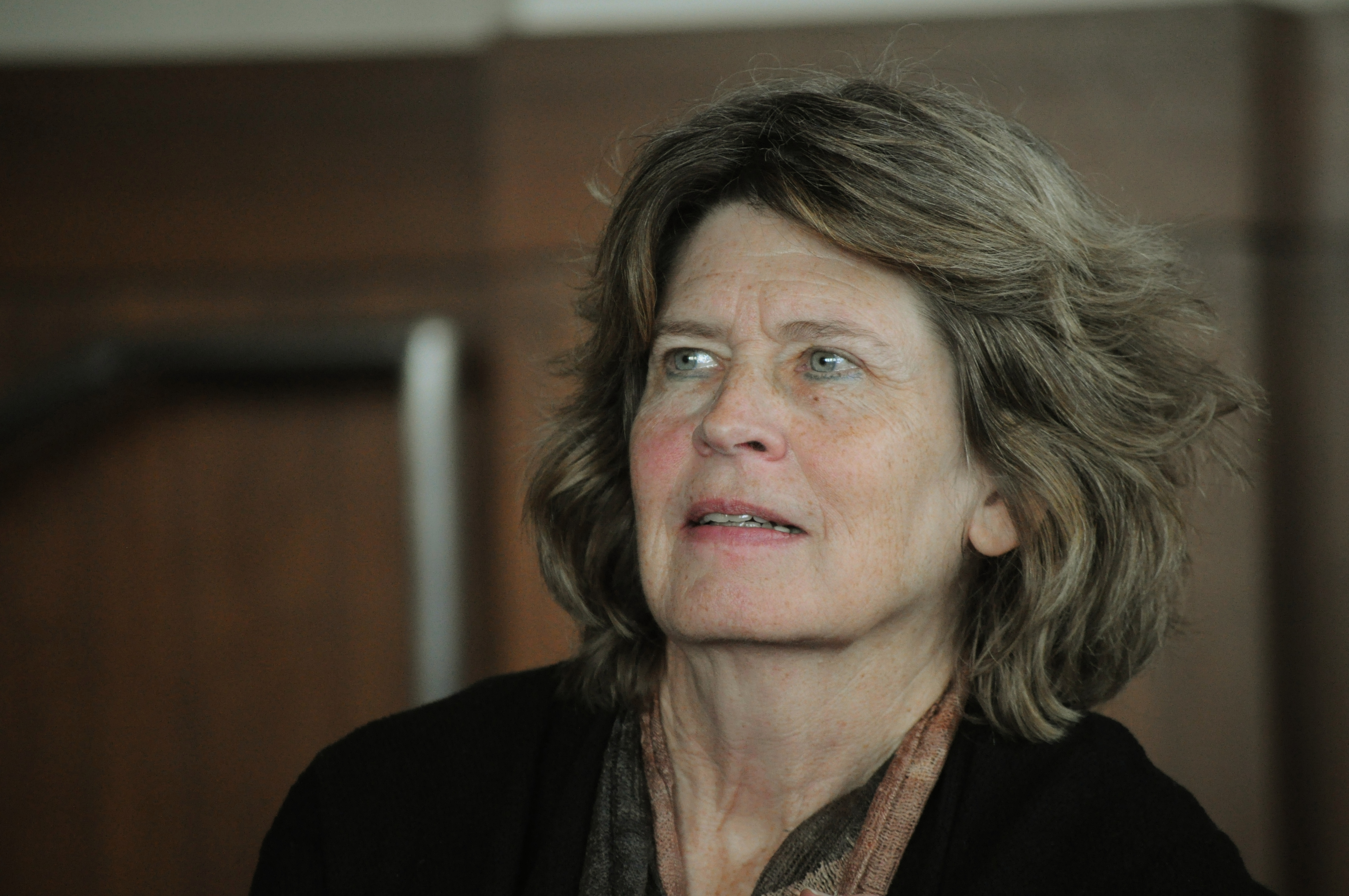
- Alice Echols, 2011

Academic background
- Education: Macalester College, University of Michigan

Academic work
- Discipline: History
- Sub-discipline: Contemporary Gender Studies
- Institutions: Rutgers University, University of Southern California

Alice Echols is Professor of History, and the Barbra Streisand Chair of Contemporary Gender Studies, at the University of Southern California. Much of Echols' work explores the transformative period of the "long Sixties" between the 1950s to the mid-1970s. Her research bridges the cultural gap between scholarly history and popular culture. She draws from her own personal history as a disco DJ as a student and maps societal shifts and influence of counterculture on the mainstream with a feminist perspective.

== Education ==
Echols received her bachelor's degree from Macalester College, Minnesota in 1973. She obtained her master's degree and Doctorate at the University of Michigan in 1980 and 1986 respectively.

== Career ==
While in graduate school in Ann Arbor at the University of Michigan, Echols visited the Rubaiyat, a since-closed predominantly gay bar where the "music just stunk." After persuasion from friends, she got a trial gig and then was hired, beginning her career as a Disco DJ.

Echols has been a professor of history at the University of Southern California since 2004. Since 2011 she has been the Barbra Streisand Professor of Contemporary Gender Studies, an endowed professorship. Echols was a visiting associate professor at Rutgers University during the 2009–2010 academic year.

== Honors and awards ==
Honor or Award	Date
Rackham Dissertation Grant, The University of Michigan	1984
Center for Gender Research Fellowship	1985
University Fellowship, The University of Michigan	1986
The Horace H. Rackham Distinguished Dissertation Award, The University of Michigan	1987
ACLS Grant-in-Aid Fellowship	1990
Gustavus Meyers Outstanding Book Award-Daring to Be Bad	1990-1991
General Education Course Innovation Award	2006-2007
USC Endowed Professorship, Barbra Streisand Professor of Contemporary Gender Studies and Professor of English, Gender Studies and History	2011-2016
USC Endowed Professorship, Barbra Streisand Professor of Contemporary Gender Studies	2016-

== Publications ==
Echols authored Daring to Be Bad: Radical Feminism in America 1967-1975 (with foreword by Ellen Willis); Scars of Sweet Paradise: The Life and Times of Janis Joplin; Shaky Ground: The Sixties and Its Aftershocks; and Hot Stuff: Disco and the Remaking of American Culture. Her book Shortfall: Family Secrets, Financial Collapse, and a Hidden History of American Banking was published by The New Press on October 3, 2017.

She also wrote a chapter on the Women's Liberation Movement in William McConnell's book The Counterculture Movement of the 1960s.

Echols was also interviewed in the 2012 documentary, The Secret Disco Revolution, where she emphasized the political nature of disco and its role in Black, queer, and women's liberation.

In 2026, Echols published, Black Power, White Heat: From Solidarity Politics to Radical Chic, a publication exploring cross-racial alliances in the freedom movements of the 1960s.

== Selected bibliography ==
- Daring to Be Bad: Radical Feminism in America 1967-1975 (with foreword by Ellen Willis) (1990)
- Pleasure and Danger: Exploring Female Sexuality By Alice Echols, Amber L. Hollibaugh, Linda Gordon, et al. (1992)
- Scars of Sweet Paradise: The Life and Times of Janis Joplin (1999)
- Shaky Ground: The Sixties and its Aftershocks (2002)
- Hot Stuff: Disco and the Remaking of American Culture (2009)
- Shortfall: Family Secrets, Financial Collapse, and a Hidden History of American Banking (2017)
- Black Power, White Heat: From Solidarity Politics to Radical Chic (2026)
