= Majority Report =

American feminist newspaper

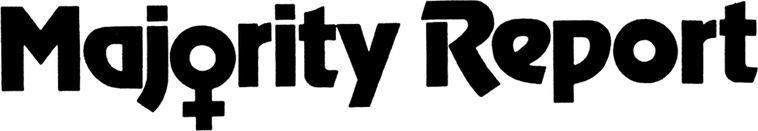
- Format: Newspaper
- Publisher: Woman's Strike Coalition
- First issue: May 10, 1971: Vol. 1, no. 1
- Final issue: April 20, 1979: Vol. 8, no. 17
- Country: United States
- Based in: New York City
- Language: English
- OCLC: 49544423

Majority Report was an American feminist newspaper published in New York City from May 1971 to April 1979. Founded by the Woman's Strike Coalition, the periodical described itself as "A Feminist Newspaper Serving the Women of New York." Majority Report had an all-woman staff who were all dedicated on reporting feminist news that weren't otherwise covered by major publications such as The New York Times. It published articles on topics such as equal rights legislation, information on services regarding divorce and daycare, and various reviews and critiques of sexist elements in media.
