= Margo Feiden =

American art gallery owner (1944–2022)

Margo Feiden (December 2, 1944 – April 4, 2022) was the proprietor of Margo Feiden Galleries Ltd. located at 15 East 9th Street in New York City. She was also a producer, director, author, and playwright.

== Career ==
In 1961, when she was 16 years old, Feiden (as Margo Eden) produced and directed a high-school version of Peter Pan in New York. The following year, she penned the play, Out, Brief Candle. In 1963, Feiden become the agent, as well as producer, director, and publicist, of Kuda Bux, a mystic and mentalist performer. Bux and Feiden appeared on stage and on television together, with Feiden answering questions while Kuda Bux performed.

Feiden, a licensed pilot, took photographer Diane Arbus flying so that the photographer could take pictures of Manhattan from the air.

In 1969, Feiden opened a gallery, and hosted an exhibition of Arbus' photographs. In 1970, Feiden exhibited the photographs of Joel-Peter Witkin. Witkin photographed Feiden, and a Witkin photograph became the basis of one of Hirschfeld's portraits of Feiden. Also in 1969, Feiden began working on the restoration of documents and works of art on paper, removing adhesives, de-acidifying the paper, and reweaving damaged paper fibres.

Feiden's gallery specialized in American art of the 20th century. She exhibited Diane Arbus, Joel-Peter Witkin, Raphael Soyer, Don Freeman, Kurt Vonnegut, Gloria Vanderbilt, Louis Lozowick, Ruth Gikow and Will Barnett.

== Family ==
Feiden was married to Julius Cohen, who predeceased her. She had two children, Bambi Goldmark and Jeremy Rosen.

== Al Hirschfeld ==
Feiden exhibited the original drawings and limited edition prints of artist Al Hirschfeld, and became his exclusive representative; this representation continued after his death. Hirschfeld created a portrait of Feiden to be used as her gallery’s logo.

In November 1994, Feiden arranged for the closure of the street outside her gallery and had craftsmen reproduce a Hirschfeld self-portrait on the asphalt forty feet long, with Hirschfeld’s finger pointing to the entrance of her gallery. The New York Times ran an aerial view of this portrait, the title of which was “A Portrait of the Artist on a City Street."

Feiden negotiated with the United States Postal Service for Hirschfeld to create a series of postage stamps; the Postal Service declared her gallery to be an official US post office. Letters that were mailed from her gallery were stamped by United States Postal Service officials "First day of issue, Margo Feiden Galleries Ltd".

In 2000, Hirschfeld sued her over contractual disagreements. During their disagreement, Hirschfeld and Feiden continued to work together every day. Their differences were resolved, and Feiden continued to represent Hirschfeld.

In 2016, Feiden and the Al Hirschfeld Foundation sued each other over contractual disagreements. In 2018 a federal judge ordered Feiden to pay $330,982 in damages to the Al Hirschfeld Foundation for losing 19 of his works and selling reproductions of others without permission. The case is Al Hirschfeld Foundation v Margo Feiden Galleries Ltd et al, U.S. District Court, Southern District of New York, No. 16-04135.

In 2020, the Al Hirschfeld Foundation successfully regained complete control of all of Al Hirschfeld's work and announced that any and all relationships between it and Margo Feiden/The Margo Feiden Galleries are 100% terminated.

== Andy Warhol ==
In her 2014 biography, Valerie Solanas, Breanne Fahs states that Solanas was at the Actors Studio that morning looking for Lee Strasberg, asking to leave her play for him. Sylvia Miles states that she told Solanas that Strasberg would not be in until the afternoon, and accepted a copy of the play from Solanas.

Fahs records that Solanas then traveled to Feiden's residence in Crown Heights, Brooklyn, as Solanas believed that Feiden would be willing to produce her play. As related to Fahs, Solanas talked to Feiden for almost four hours, trying to convince her to produce the play and discussing her vision for a world without men. Throughout this time, Feiden repeatedly refused to produce Solanas's play. According to Feiden, Solanas then pulled out her gun, and when Feiden again refused to commit to producing the play, Solanas responded, "Yes, you will produce the play because I'll shoot Andy Warhol and that will make me famous and the play famous, and then you'll produce it." As she was leaving Feiden's residence, Solanas handed Feiden a copy of her play and other personal papers.

Fahs describes how Feiden then "frantically called her local police precinct, Andy Warhol's precinct, police headquarters in Lower Manhattan, and the offices of Mayor John Lindsay and Governor Nelson Rockefeller to report what happened and inform them that Solanas was on her way at that very moment to shoot Andy Warhol." In some instances, the police responded that "You can't arrest someone because you believe she is going to kill Andy Warhol," and even asked Feiden "Listen lady, how would you know what a real gun looked like?" In a 2009 interview with James Barron of The New York Times, Feiden said that she did know that Solanas intended to kill Warhol, but could not prevent it.

== Author ==
In 1983, Feiden wrote the text for Limited Edition Etchings and Lithographs by Al Hirschfeld. The catalogue had at least three editions between 1983 and 1990.

In 1983, Da Capo Press re-issued Hirschfeld's Show Business is No Business. Originally published in 1951 by Simon & Schuster, the Da Capo edition included a foreword and end notes by Feiden.

In 1989 Feiden wrote the reference book, Margo Feiden’s The Calorie Factor which was published by Simon & Schuster. In 1989, Feiden won the Library Journal Award, which cited her book as one of the ten best reference books of that year.

== Media ==
Feiden appears in the Oscar-nominated documentary film The Line King: The Al Hirschfeld Story, and she was also in the book and the film entitled Faces of New York by Peter Tunney and Antonio Guccione.

== Death ==
Margo Feiden died Saturday, April 4, 2022, in Greenwich Village after suffering lengthy complications from a fall. She was 77. She is interred in Mt. Carmel Cemetery in Queens.

== Sources ==
- Fahs, Breanne (2014). Valerie Solanas: The Defiant Life of the Woman Who Wrote SCUM (and Shot Andy Warhol). New York, NY: The Feminist Press. ISBN 978-1558618480. Archived from the original on 2014-04-29.
- Howard, Beth, American Theatre, 1988, pp. 17
- O'Brien, Glenn, Interview Magazine, March 24, 2009
