= Up Your Ass (play) =

1965 feminist play by Valerie Solanas

Up Your Ass, or, From the Cradle to the Boat, or, The Big Suck, or, Up from the Slime
- Original language: English
- Written by: Valerie Solanas
- Characters: Bongi Perez; Passers-By; Spade Cat; White Cat; Alvin Koontz; Waitress; Ginger; Russell; Miss Collins; Scheherazade; Teacher; Mrs. Arthur Hazlatt; Boy
- Genre: Satire
- Setting: A large American city; the sidewalk

Premiere
- Date: 2000
- Place: George Coates Performance Works

Up Your Ass, or, From the Cradle to the Boat, or, The Big Suck, or, Up from the Slime is a radical feminist play written in 1965 by Valerie Solanas. According to writer James Martin Harding, the play is "based on a plot about a woman who 'is a man-hating hustler and panhandler' and who ... ends up killing a man."

== Plot ==
Bongi Perez, a lesbian prostitute, stands on a sidewalk shouting rude and forward come-ons to passing women, all of whom rebuff her. Two men, White Cat and Spade Cat, join her in catcalling, claiming that their objectification of women is no different from hers. Spade Cat is successful at attracting a woman and leaves with her. White Cat, frustrated, goes home, leaving Bongi alone.

Another man, Alvin, approaches Bongi and engages her in conversation, asking why she seems unhappy. Bongi responds that she is never unhappy because she amuses herself with memories of some of her more bizarre previous clients, then proceeds to tell Alvin about a few. Alvin, intrigued, invites her back to his apartment, but Bongi states that she only has sex for money and never goes back to any man's apartment. After negotiating a price, Alvin and Bongi have sex in an alley offstage. Alvin leaves, and Bongi returns to shout remarks at passersby.

A drag queen named Miss Collins, with whom Bongi is acquainted, greets Bongi. Miss Collins laments that he (Note: Both drag queen characters are referred to by he/him pronouns in the text of the play.) is a man and wishes he were a lesbian. A second drag queen named Scheherazade insists that he is female and insults Miss Collins, who chases Scheherazade offstage with a handbag.

A young woman named Ginger approaches Bongi, asking if she has seen a lost yellow turd, which she plans to serve at a dinner with two male friends, stating that men appreciate women who know how to "eat shit." Bongi accepts Ginger's invitation to the dinner party, where she is introduced to one of Ginger's guests, Russell, whom Bongi finds pretentious. Bongi claims that all relationships between men and women are inherently transactional and sexual and that her career as a sex worker is more honest than Ginger and Russell's idealistic goal of equality. Bongi offers to prove her theory by having sex with Russell, but as she begins to remove her pants, the stage goes dark.

A single spotlight illuminates a schoolteacher, who delivers a speech to an invisible audience of women who have come to learn "basic fucking," which the teacher insists is the foundation and primary function of marriage.

The lights return to find Bongi sitting on some steps. She accosts a married woman (referred to as Arthur), who is the first person to challenge Bongi's perspective: while Bongi despises men, marriage, and motherhood in theory, Arthur, who has practical experience with all three, has even more reason to resent them. Just as the two discover that they are kindred spirits, Arthur is interrupted by her young son, who has just been evicted from a playground for exposing his penis. Arthur strangles her son and buries him offstage while Bongi expresses her admiration.

Arthur returns and joins Bongi on the steps. A woman walks by and Bongi and Arthur follow her offstage, both catcalling her.

== Rediscovery ==
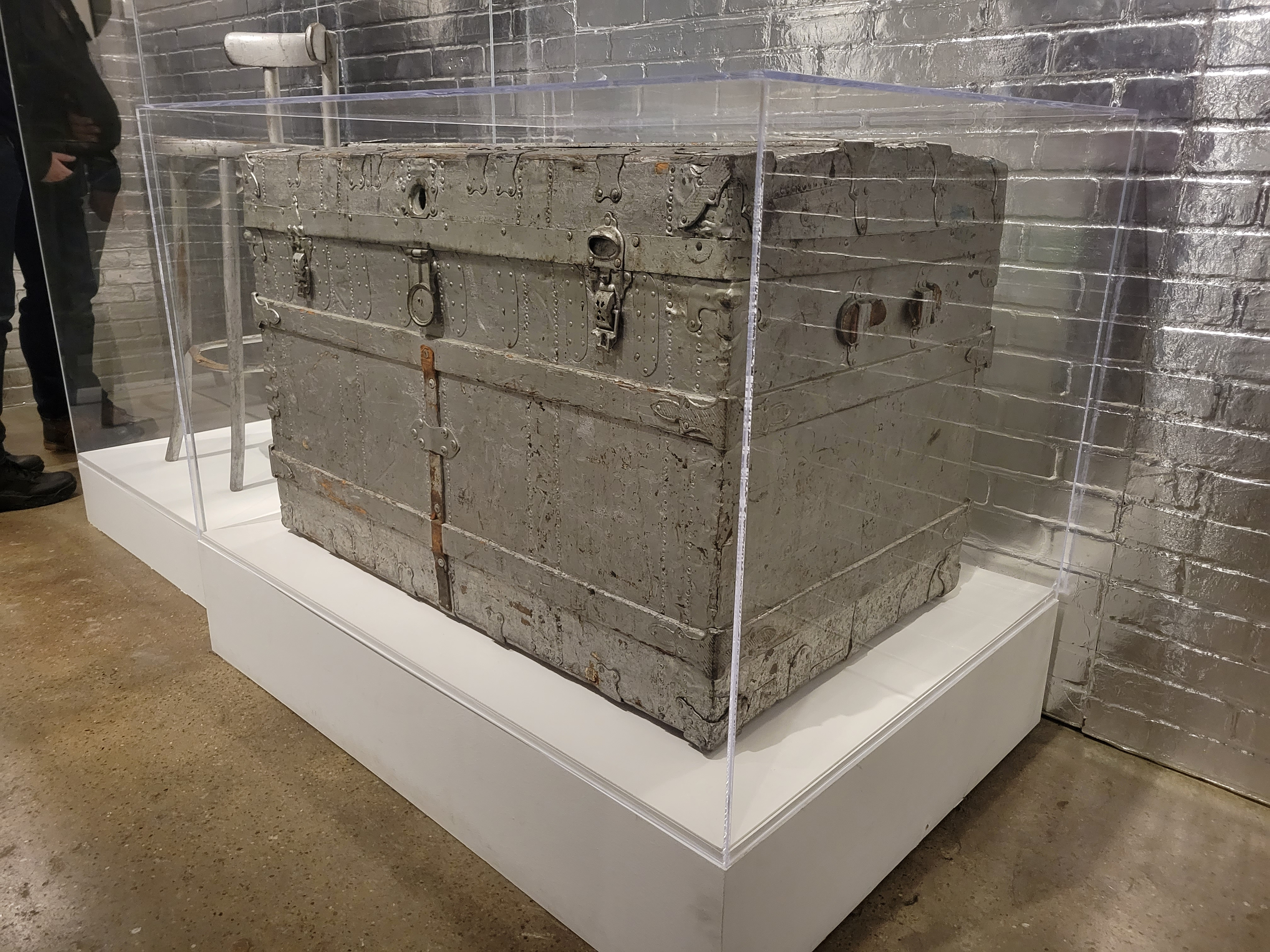
This prop trunk, used in Andy Warhol's Silver Factory, is where the copy of the "Up Your Ass" script Solanas gave Warhol was eventually found after Warhol's death in 1987.

Up Your Ass was rediscovered in 1999 and produced in 2000 by George Coates Performance Works in San Francisco. The copy Warhol had lost was found in a trunk of lighting equipment owned by Billy Name. Coates learned about the rediscovered manuscript while at an exhibition at The Andy Warhol Museum marking the 30th anniversary of the shooting. Coates turned the piece into a musical with an all-female cast. Coates consulted with Solanas's sister, Judith, while writing the piece, and sought to create a "very funny satirist" out of Solanas, not just showing her as Warhol's attempted assassin.

Up Your Ass remained unpublished until published as an ebook in 2014.

The play was performed for the first time in 23 years (and for the first time as written) at Emory University by a student-led group in November 2023. The show was directed by student Olivia Gilbert and starred student Saanvi Nayar as Bongi Perez.

Up Your Ass was performed for the second time in its original entirety at Kenyon College in February 2024. The show was produced by StageFemmes, a student-led theater organization, directed by Ruby Rosenfeld, and starred Chiara Rothenberg as Bongi Perez.

== Reception ==
The play was first performed in 2000 at the George Coates Performance Works theater in San Francisco. This version of the play was called "fundamentally flawed but farcical fun".

Writer James Harding describes Up Your Ass as more a "provocation than ... a work of dramatic literature" and "rather adolescent and contrived."
