= Dana Heller =

Dean at Eastern Michigan University

Dana Heller is the dean of the College of Arts and Sciences at Eastern Michigan University. Previously she was the chair of the English Department at Old Dominion University (ODU) and in 2016–2017, was interim dean at their College of Arts and Letters.

Heller is on the board of Jurors for the Peabody Awards.

== Early life and education ==
Her undergraduate degree is from Goddard College where she majored in English and theater. From Columbia University she earned a master's degree in creative writing. The Graduate Center, CUNY awarded her a Ph.D. in English.

== Career ==
At ODU, she was also Director of the Humanities Institute and Graduate Program.

== Publications ==
- Family Plots: The De-Oedipalization of Popular Culture
- editor of Cross Purposes: Lesbians, Feminists, and the Limits of Alliance
