= Hotel Chelsea =

Historic hotel in Manhattan, New York

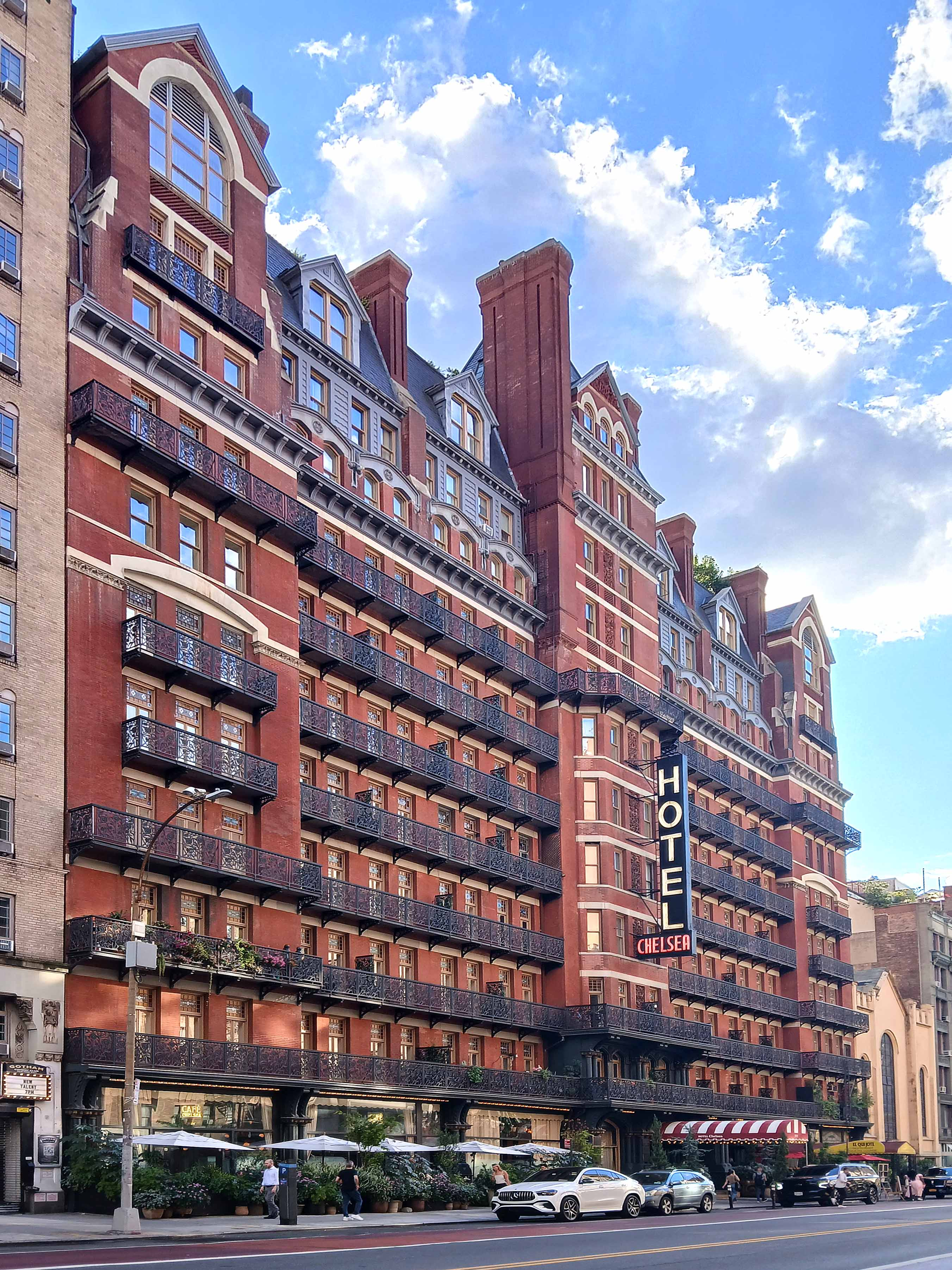
- Seen from across 23rd Street
- Alternative names: Chelsea Hotel
- Etymology: The neighborhood of Chelsea, Manhattan

General information
- Type: Hotel
- Architectural style: Queen Anne Revival, Victorian Gothic
- Location: 222 West 23rd Street, Manhattan, New York, U.S.
- Coordinates: 40°44′40″N 73°59′49″W
- Construction started: 1883
- Opened: 1884
- Renovated: 1905 (hotel conversion); 1960s (facade and lobby); 1990s (facade and some interiors); 2011–2022 (conversion to luxury hotel)
- Owner: Chelsea Hotel Owner LLC
- Operator: BD Hotels

Height
- Height: 180 ft (55 m)

Technical details
- Floor count: 12
- Grounds: 17,281 ft^{2} (1,605.5 m^{2})

Design and construction
- Architect: Philip Hubert
- Architecture firm: Hubert, Pirsson & Co.
- Developer: Chelsea Association

Other information
- Number of rooms: 155 (125 hotel rooms, 30 suites)
- Public transit: Subway: 1 train at 23rd Street

Website
- hotelchelsea.com
- Hotel Chelsea
- U.S. National Register of Historic Places
- New York State Register of Historic Places
- New York City Landmark
- Location within Lower Manhattan Location within New York City Location within New York
- Location: 222 West 23rd Street; Chelsea, Manhattan, New York City
- Coordinates: 40°44′40″N 73°59′48″W
- Built: 1883–1884
- Architects: Hubert, Pirsson and Company
- Architectural style: Queen Anne Revival, Victorian Gothic
- NRHP reference No.: 77000958
- NYSRHP No.: 06101.000148
- NYCL No.: 0215

Significant dates
- Added to NRHP: December 27, 1977
- Designated NYSRHP: June 23, 1980
- Designated NYCL: March 15, 1966

The Hotel Chelsea (also known as the Chelsea Hotel and the Chelsea) is a hotel at 222 West 23rd Street in the Chelsea neighborhood of Manhattan in New York City. Built between 1883 and 1884, the hotel was designed by Philip Hubert in a style described variously as Queen Anne Revival and Victorian Gothic. The 12-story Chelsea, originally a housing cooperative, has been the home of numerous writers, musicians, artists, and entertainers, some of whom still lived there in the 21st century. As of 2022, most of the Chelsea is a luxury hotel. The building is a New York City designated landmark and on the National Register of Historic Places.

The front facade of the Hotel Chelsea is 11 stories high, while the rear of the hotel rises 12 stories. The facade is divided vertically into five sections and is made of brick, with some flower-ornamented iron balconies; the hotel is capped by a high mansard roof. The Hotel Chelsea has thick load-bearing walls made of masonry, as well as wrought iron floor beams and large, column-free spaces. When the hotel opened, the ground floor was divided into an entrance hall, four storefronts, and a restaurant; this has been rearranged over the years, with a bar and the El Quijote restaurant occupying part of the ground floor. The Chelsea was among the first buildings in the city with duplex and penthouse apartments, and there is also a rooftop terrace. The hotel originally had no more than 100 apartments; it was subdivided into 400 units during the 20th century and has 155 units as of 2022.

The idea for the Chelsea arose after Hubert & Pirsson had developed several housing cooperatives in New York City. Developed by the Chelsea Association, the structure quickly attracted authors and artists after opening. Several factors, including financial hardships and tenant relocations, prompted the Chelsea's conversion into an apartment hotel in 1905. Knott Hotels took over the hotel in 1921 and managed it until about 1942, when David Bard bought it out of bankruptcy. Julius Krauss and Joseph Gross joined Bard as owners in 1947. After David Bard died in 1964, his son Stanley operated it for 43 years, forming close relationships with many tenants. The hotel underwent numerous minor changes in the late 20th century after falling into a state of disrepair. The Krauss and Gross families took over the hotel in 2007 and were involved in numerous tenant disputes before the Chelsea closed for a major renovation in 2011. The hotel changed ownership twice in the 2010s before BD Hotels took over in 2016, and the Chelsea reopened in 2022.

The Chelsea has become known for its many notable guests. Residents have included Mark Twain, Dylan Thomas, Arthur Miller, Bob Dylan, Edie Sedgwick, Janis Joplin, Leonard Cohen, Arthur C. Clarke, Patti Smith, Robert Mapplethorpe, Miloš Forman, and Virgil Thomson. The Chelsea received much commentary for the creative culture that Bard helped create within the hotel. Critics also appraised the hotel's interior—which was reputed for its uncleanliness in the mid- and late 20th century—and the quality of the hotel rooms themselves. The Chelsea has been the setting or inspiration for many works of popular media, and it has been used as an event venue and filming location.

== Site ==
The Hotel Chelsea is at 222 West 23rd Street in the Chelsea neighborhood of Manhattan in New York City. It stands on the south side of the street, between Eighth Avenue and Seventh Avenue. The rectangular land lot covers about 17,281 square feet (1,605.5 m^{2}), with a frontage of 175 feet (53 m) on 23rd Street to the north and a depth of 98.75 feet (30.10 m).

The hotel was developed on a site created by combining seven land lots. The assembled parcel measured 175 feet wide and 86 to 96 feet (26 to 29 m) deep. Before construction of the hotel, the site had been occupied by a furniture store, which burned down in 1878; the land then remained vacant for four years. The store and the land had belonged to James Ingersoll, who was associated with the Tammany Hall political ring in the 1870s. When the Hotel Chelsea was completed in 1884, the lot was flanked by a church on either side.

== Architecture ==
The Hotel Chelsea was designed by Philip Hubert of the firm of Hubert, Pirrson & Company. The style has been described variously as Queen Anne Revival, Victorian Gothic, or a mixture of the two. It was one of the first Victorian Gothic buildings to be erected in New York City. At the time of its completion, it was the city's tallest apartment building and one of the tallest structures in Manhattan, (Note: Although some early sources claimed that the Chelsea was Manhattan's tallest structure until 1902 (when the Flatiron Building was finished), the Flatiron Building was never the tallest building in Manhattan.) at approximately 180 feet (55 m) tall. According to the New York City Landmarks Preservation Commission, the Chelsea's design was evocative of the demolished Spanish Flats on Central Park South.

=== Facade ===
Chelsea Hotel exterior detail

The front facade of the hotel, on 23rd Street, is 11 stories high and is divided vertically into 25 bays. The rear of the hotel rises to a height of 12 stories. The 23rd Street facade is made of red brick. It is grouped into five sections, with projecting pavilions at the western end, center, and eastern end of the facade. These pavilions flank two groups of recessed bays. The main entrance within the central pavilion remains largely intact, although the storefronts on either side have been modified over the years. There are several brass plaques next to the main entrance, commemorating notable residents, and another plaque mentioning that the building is on the National Register of Historic Places.

On the upper floors, the brick is interspersed with white stone bands. The hotel has flower-ornamented iron balconies on its second through eighth stories, which were constructed by J.B. and J.M. Cornell. These balconies were intended as "light balconies, after the Paris fashion"; according to author Sherill Tippins, the balconies were meant to "add charm to the lower floors". The balconies were also intended to indicate that the interiors were ornately decorated. French doors lead from some apartments to the balconies.

The building is topped by a high mansard roof. The central pavilion has a pyramidal slate roof. There are brick chimneys on either side of the pyramidal-roofed pavilion. In addition, the pavilions on either end of the facade are topped by brick gables with large arched windows. The remainder of the roof features dormer windows and additional brick chimneys. Atop the roof was a brick-floored space, which could be adapted into a roof garden or promenade. The center of the roof was interspersed with hip roofs, beneath which were duplex apartments; residents of these duplexes had direct access to the roof.

=== Structural and mechanical features ===
The Hotel Chelsea has thick load-bearing walls made of masonry, which measure 3 feet (0.91 m) thick at their bottoms and taper to 20 inches (0.51 m) at their tops. This allowed the superstructure to support the weight of two additional stories if the building were expanded. The walls support floor beams made of wrought iron; these floor beams are not supported by intermediate columns, creating large column-free spaces. The floor beams were covered with plaster to prevent fire from spreading. As another fireproofing measure, the hotel used as little wood as possible. Ceilings measured 12 to 14 feet (3.7 to 4.3 m) high.

The basement measured up to 30 feet (9.1 m) deep and housed the kitchen, laundry, refrigerators, coal rooms, engines, and machinery for gas-powered and electric light. As planned, the hotel had three passenger elevators and two steam-powered freight lifts. When it was completed in 1884, the hotel had speaking tubes; pressurized steam; a telephone in each room, connecting to the hotel manager's office; and 1,800 lights powered by either gas or electricity. The hotel contained then-innovative features such as electricity, steam heating, and hot and cold water. Dumbwaiters transported food from the basement kitchen to each floor.

=== Public areas ===
When the hotel opened in 1884, the ground floor was divided into an entrance hall, four storefronts, and a restaurant for tenants who did not have their own kitchen. The lobby was originally furnished with a marble floor and mahogany wainscoting. On the left wall of the lobby was an elaborate fireplace mantel, which remained intact in the late 20th century. To the right of the lobby was a reception room decorated in white maple, a plush-and-velvet carpet, and old-gold surfaces. Three interconnected dining rooms, reserved for residents, were placed behind the lobby. These rooms had decorations such as stained glass, carved gargoyles, and fleurs-de-lis. Next to the lobby was a manager's office, whose ceiling had gold trimmings and a mural with clouds and angels. There was also a barbershop, as well as a restaurant, cafe, laundry room, billiards room, bakery, fish-and-meat shop, and grocery on the ground floor and basement. Hotel staff lived in another building behind the main hotel, connected to it by a tunnel.

As of 2022, the hotel's lobby is decorated with inlaid ceilings and mosaic-tile floors. The lobby contains furniture in various colors, while the front desk is clad with purple marble. In addition, various paintings by residents are hung on the beige-pink walls, and the lobby's ceiling is decorated with frescoes, roses, and garlands. Adjacent to the lobby is the Lobby Bar, which contains mosaic-tile floors, a marble bar, art from former residents, and old chandeliers. This bar, formerly storage space, has several pieces of mid-century modern furniture and vintage furnishings such as lamps. Other decorative elements include skylights, floor tiles, brick walls, and trellises covered with vegetation.

Next to the lobby is the El Quijote restaurant, which has occupied the hotel since 1955. The restaurant is decorated with a marble terrazzo floor, a rough-hewn ceiling, red-vinyl dining booths, and chandeliers. Among the decorations are a series of murals depicting scenes from the book Don Quixote, as well as oil paintings. El Quijote contains a private bar next to its main dining room. Prior to 2018, the restaurant sat 220 people; the Dulcinea and Cervantes rooms at the rear comprised nearly half of the restaurant's seating capacity. These rooms were removed in a 2022 renovation, which also reduced the restaurant's capacity to 45 or 65. Since 2023, the hotel has also contained the Café Chelsea bistro, located within three rooms. The bistro includes vintage decorations, some taken from the Lord & Taylor Building.

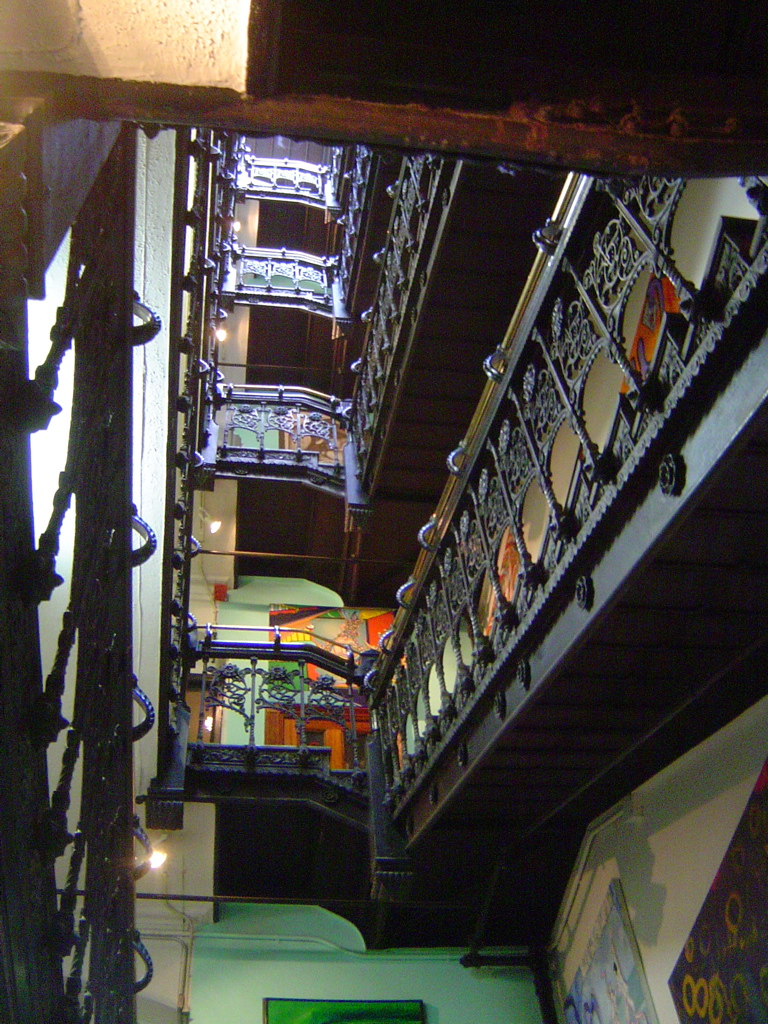
Art fills the staircase of the Hotel Chelsea.

Also at ground level is a mom-and-pop store named Chelsea Guitars and a private event space known as the Bard Room. The main staircase, at the center of the hotel, is illuminated by a rooftop skylight and is only accessible to guests. The walls of the staircase were once lined with photos created by residents. The staircase originally had iron railings and marble treads. The center of the building is surmounted by a pyramid accessed by a narrow wooden staircase. There was also an elevator cage, decorated with rosettes that matched the exterior decorations. The upper stories include a gym and a rooftop spa.

=== Guestrooms and apartments ===
==== Original units ====
The Chelsea was among the first buildings in the city with duplex apartments and penthouse apartments. Above the ground floor, there were originally either 90, 97, or 100 apartments in total. There were ten apartments on each story, ranging from 800 to 3,000 square feet (74 to 279 m^{2}). Each floor had a mixture of small and large apartments, so residents of different socioeconomic classes could reside on the same story. Sources disagree on whether the largest apartments had eight, ten, or twelve rooms. Old floor plans show that the apartments were arranged along a single west–east corridor on each floor; these corridors measured up to 8 feet (2.4 m) wide. The largest apartments occupied either end of the hotel and had at least four bedrooms, while mid-sized two- and three-bedroom units were placed next to these. The smallest units, targeted at unmarried men and women, were arranged near the stairs and elevators at the center of the building.

A variety of styles and materials were used in the apartments to fit each tenant's taste. Originally, the interiors were ornately decorated. The dadoes and some of the floors were made of marble, and there was also hardwood floors and doors. In addition, the fireplace mantels were made of onyx, and the fireplaces contained andirons with rosettes.

Every apartment had its own bathroom, and many units also had servants' bedrooms. Only the largest apartments had kitchens; everyone else received meals from the restaurants or a caterer. There were 67 apartments with kitchens, each of which had a refrigerator as well as a stove powered by coal, gas, or steam. One of the larger apartments, suite 920, belonged to the hotel's manager and consisted of three rooms with high ceilings. The apartments on the tenth and eleventh floors were intended for artists, taking advantage of sunlight from the north. These apartments were arranged as duplexes, with artists' studios on the upper level and bedrooms on the lower level, and were in high demand when the Chelsea opened. The twelfth floor contained a space accessible only from the rooftop promenade; this was intended as a clinic. Tenants could also use a ballroom under the roof.

==== Subsequent changes ====
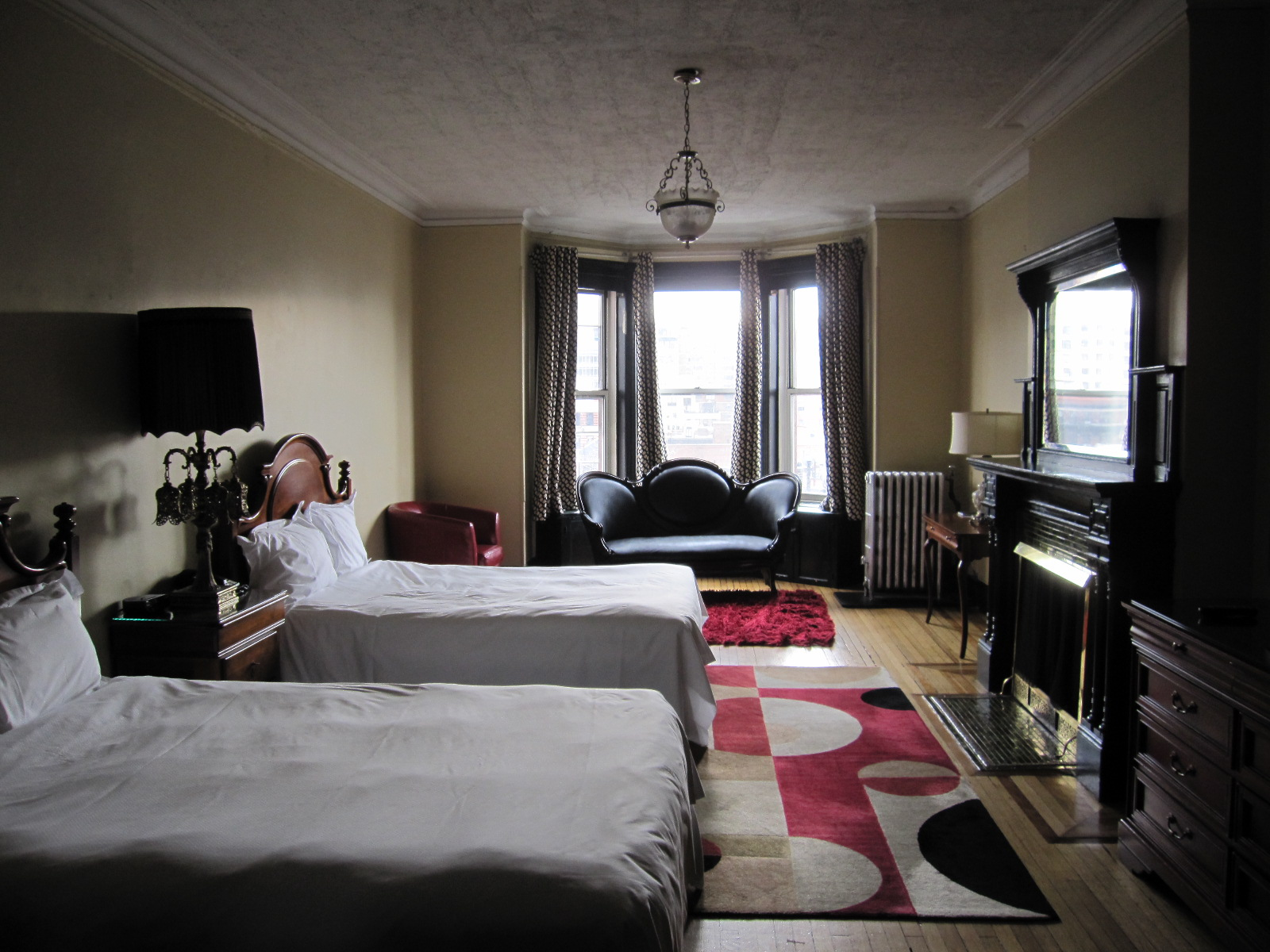
A suite in the hotel prior to its 2010s and 2020s renovation

By the 1980s, the hotel had been subdivided into 400 rooms, many of which retained their original thick walls and fireplaces. This was reduced by the 2000s to about 240 or 250 units (some with multiple rooms). All of the units had a unique layout. The rooms were accessed via wide marble corridors and varied significantly in decorative motif.

Following a renovation that was completed in 2022, some decorative features, such as entry halls and doorknobs, were redesigned with monograms containing the hotel's name. There are approximately 155 rooms, divided into 125 single-room units and 30 suites; the largest units are two-bedroom apartments with en-suite kitchens. As an allusion to the Chelsea's artistic clientele, the rooms are decorated with artworks collected between the 1970s and the 1990s, in addition to headboards with splattered-paint patterns. Some rooms retain original fireplaces and stained glass windows. The guestrooms also have design features such as wooden nightstands, closets with wallpaper, and marble-clad bathrooms. Five of the former artists' residences are retained in the modern-day hotel, and some of the rooms have wheelchair-accessible features such as shelves and bathrooms.

== History ==
During the early 19th century, apartment developments in the city were generally associated with the working class, but by the late 19th century, apartments were also becoming desirable among the middle and upper classes. Between 1880 and 1885, more than ninety apartment buildings were developed in the city. The architect Philip Hubert and his partner James W. Pirrson had created a "Hubert Home Club" in 1880 for the Rembrandt, a six-story building on 57th Street that had been built as housing for artists. This early cooperative building had rental units to help defray costs, and it also provided servants as part of the building staff. The success of this model led to other "Hubert Home Clubs", including the Chelsea. Hubert believed that such clubs could help entice middle- and upper-class New Yorkers to live in apartment buildings.

=== Development ===
After constructing several more Home Clubs in the 1880s, Hubert decided to construct a structure in Chelsea. In contrast to previous clubs, where residents were selected according to their beliefs and socioeconomic status, Hubert wanted the new building to house as diverse a group of residents as possible. Hubert planned a structure as a self-contained, purpose-built artists' community, based on a concept by the philosopher Charles Fourier. The structure, later known as the Chelsea Hotel, was originally known as the Chelsea Association Building and was to be developed by the Chelsea Association. It is unknown who specifically devised the idea for the building. A construction materials dealer named George M. Smith applied for the hotel's building permit; he was one of several members of the Chelsea Association's building committee. By contrast, a contemporary New-York Tribune article described "some 50 people of means" as having been responsible for development.

Hubert identified a vacant site on 23rd Street between Eighth and Seventh Avenues, which had been occupied by James Ingersoll's furniture store, as well as an adjoining townhouse on 22nd Street. Hubert paid Ingersoll $175,000 (equivalent to $5,130,000 in 2025 (Note: Johnston, Louis; Williamson, Samuel H. (2023). "What Was the U.S. GDP Then?". MeasuringWorth. United States Gross Domestic Product deflator figures follow the MeasuringWorth series.)) for the plots and promised Ingersoll an apartment in the new building, as well as membership in the Chelsea Association. Hubert, Pirsson & Co. filed plans in early 1883 for a "cooperative club apartment house" on the site at an estimated cost of $350,000 (equivalent to $10,260,000 in 2025). In August 1883, the Chelsea Association obtained a $200,000 mortgage loan for the building (equivalent to $5,863,000 in 2025) from the Equitable Life Assurance Society. The same bank placed a $300,000 mortgage loan on the hotel that December (equivalent to $8,794,000 in 2025). By March 1884, the Chelsea Association Building was nearly complete. One account in The New York Times described the Chelsea as "the most profitable and popular of [Hubert and Pirsson's] enterprises".

=== Early years and hotel conversion ===
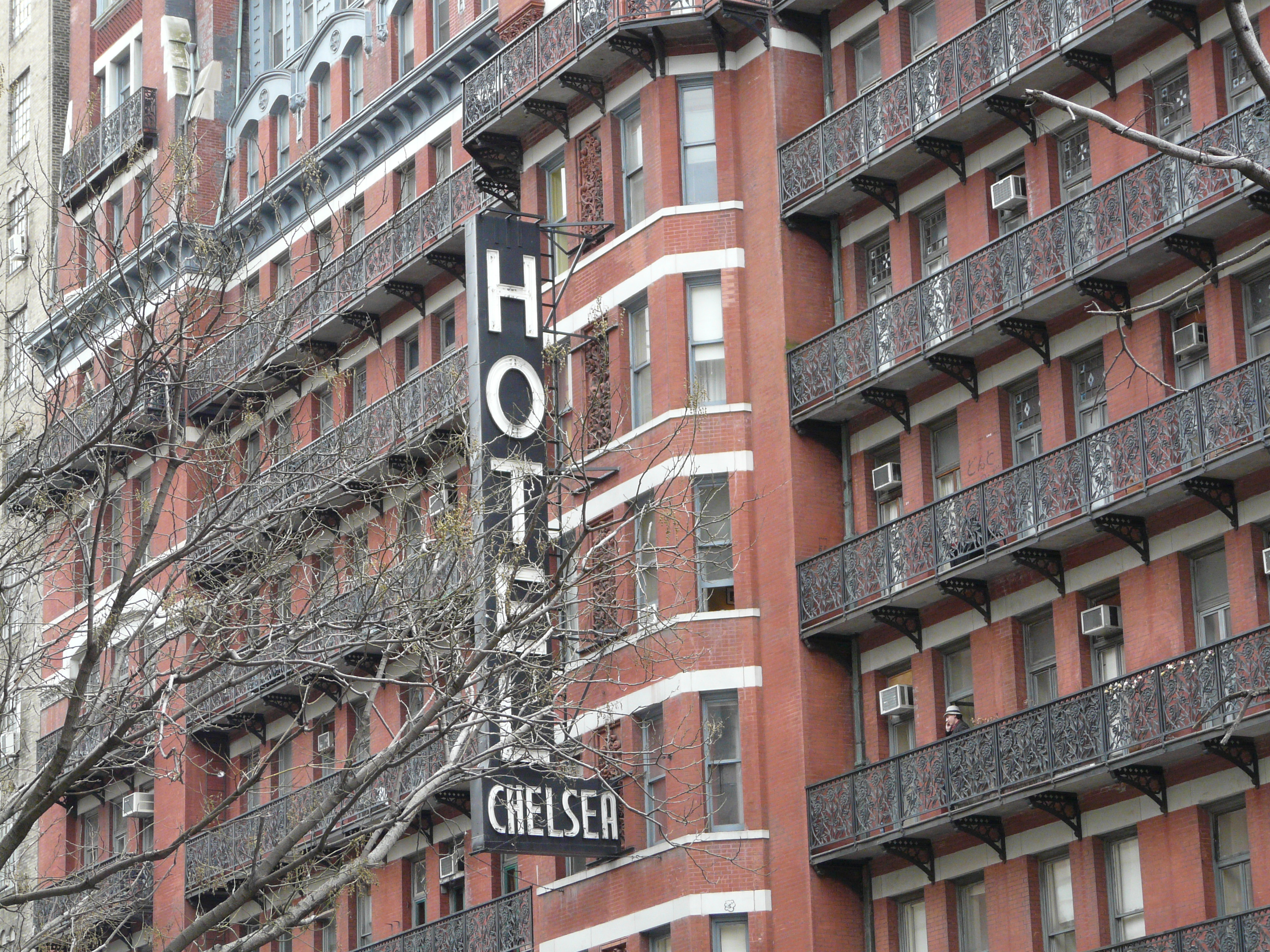
A close-up of the hotel's signage

The Chelsea began accepting residents in 1884 and was structured as a housing cooperative. Two-thirds of the original apartments were owned by Chelsea Association stockholders, and the other third were rented out. Almost from the outset, the Chelsea was one of the most popular of Hubert's Home Clubs, and there were more prospective tenants than available apartments. Tippins wrote that, "from the beginning, the Chelsea was a home for eccentrics and the artists were there by design". The Chelsea was located in what was then the center of New York City's theater district, with venues such as the Booth's Theatre and the Grand Opera House nearby.

Its early residents represented a wide variety of groups, from unmarried professionals to large families. Many of the hotel's early guests were authors and artists. According to the Real Estate Record and Guide, many construction suppliers and workers moved into the apartments rather than accept monetary compensation. The building also attracted wealthy widows, government officials, and a variety of other middle- and upper-class professionals, though Hubert refused to disclose residents' names for the social registers. These residents largely moved from other apartment buildings. There were also 30 servants, mostly immigrants from Germany and Ireland.

In 1898, Lippincott's Monthly Magazine described the Chelsea as one of Manhattan's "literary shrines", in part because of the presence of residents such as Edward Eggleston and Jane Cunningham Croly. Other early residents included painter Rufus Fairchild Zogbaum, poet Henry Abbey, and actress Annie Russell. By the end of the 19th century, the co-op was in decline due to the suspicions of New York City's middle class about apartment living, the development of houses further north in Manhattan, and the relocation of the city's theater district. The 1893 economic crash, and the lasting effects of another crash in the 1900s, further strained the Chelsea Association's finances. During the 1890s, many of the Chelsea Association's original stockholders either died, moved away, or had become involved in legal and financial controversies. By the 1900s, the Chelsea was accepting a larger number of short-term visitors. A Chicago Tribune reporter wrote in the late 20th century that the co-op had never "had a heyday", as many wealthy residents were already moving uptown after the hotel was completed.

The building was officially converted to an apartment hotel in 1905. At the time of the conversion, the Chelsea was divided into 125 units. Small studios that had been converted from maids' quarters were available for as little as $1.50 per night (equivalent to $54 in 2025 (Note: 1634–1699: McCusker, J. J. (1997). How Much Is That in Real Money? A Historical Price Index for Use as a Deflator of Money Values in the Economy of the United States: Addenda et Corrigenda (PDF). American Antiquarian Society. 1700–1799: McCusker, J. J. (1992). How Much Is That in Real Money? A Historical Price Index for Use as a Deflator of Money Values in the Economy of the United States (PDF). American Antiquarian Society. 1800–present: Federal Reserve Bank of Minneapolis. "Consumer Price Index (estimate) 1800–".)), while units that had one or two bedrooms cost up to $4–5 per night (equivalent to between $143 and $179 in 2025). In the first two decades of the 20th century, the hotel hosted events such a merchandise sales; meetings of local groups, like the Chelsea Society of New York and Syracuse University Club of New York; and educational lectures. Following the sinking of the RMS Titanic in 1912, several guests from the Titanic were also given rooms at the hotel. The managers sometimes removed guests' corpses from the hotel. The opening of the New York City Subway's Broadway–Seventh Avenue Line in the late 1910s had spurred development in the surrounding area, although the Hotel Chelsea remained in use as an apartment hotel. One of the ground-level stores was leased to the Greater Engineering Company in 1920.

=== Knott operation ===
Knott Hotels, a family-owned firm that operated numerous budget hotels in New York City, leased the hotel in March 1921, establishing the 222 West Twenty-third Street Hotel Corporation to operate the Chelsea. The lease initially ran until 1942. By then, half of the Chelsea Association's original stockholders remained, and many parts of the hotel needed to be repaired or upgraded. Shortly after taking over, the Knotts split up some of the apartments, added a reception desk at the bottom of the Chelsea's grand staircase, closed the dining room, and added kitchenettes to existing apartments. In addition, the hotel's American floor numbering system was changed to a European floor numbering system; for instance, the second story, directly above ground level, was renumbered as floor 1. The Knott family extended their lease by another 43 years in 1922, agreeing to pay a total of $6,196,000 (equivalent to $93,578,000 in 2025) through the lease's projected expiration in 1985.

The Hotel Chelsea continued to serve as a "headquarters for painters and writers", as described by the New York Herald Tribune. The Hotel Carteret was erected to the east in 1927, blocking eastward views from the Chelsea. To attract more tenants, the Knotts decreased prices for rooms at the eastern end of the hotel. In addition, the Knott family transferred the hotel's ownership to the Knott Corporation, a Delaware company, in September 1927. By the end of the 1920s, the Chelsea had been further subdivided into more than 300 rooms. The Knotts had replaced the lobby's paintings with wallpaper, and they had moved the original lobby furniture to make way for a heater on a banquette. Most of the hotel's bellhops and waiters were African-American by this time. Switchboard operators and desk clerks called residents by their nicknames. The Asbury Park Press called the Chelsea one of the "last ornate landmarks of a Little Old New York locality".

Batchelder's Restaurant leased the Chelsea's restaurant space in early 1930. During that decade, the Chelsea Hotel remained popular among artists and writers because of the low rents, the friendly atmosphere, and the fact that the residences provided large amounts of privacy. Because many of the old apartments had been subdivided, each floor had various winding corridors leading to the different rooms. The low rents in particular attracted artists like John Sloan and Edgar Lee Masters. There was controversy in late 1934 when then-manager Jerry Gagin commissioned a series of satirical paintings from John McKiernan, depicting three politicians. (Note: In particular, U.S. senator Huey Long, New York governor Alfred E. Smith, and U.S. postmaster general James A. Farley.) Knott Hotels president William Knott ordered Gagin to remove the murals, but Gagin refused, and the murals were instead covered up.

=== Bard, Gross, and Krauss operation ===
The last member of the Chelsea Association died around 1941, and the hotel went bankrupt around the same time. The New York Bank for Savings repossessed the building at an auction in approximately July 1942. That October, the Bank for Savings sold the hotel, along with the adjacent brownstone house at 229 West 22nd Street, to the Chelsea Hotel Company at an assessed value of $561,500 (equivalent to $8,736,000 in 2025). The buyers took over a $220,000 mortgage (equivalent to $3,423,000 in 2025) that had been placed on the hotel. (Note: Later sources give varying dates of 1939, 1940, or 1942) At the time, the hotel had seven stores, 319 guestrooms, and 176 bathrooms. Following the sale to the Chelsea Hotel Company, the hotel was operated by a syndicate of Hungarian immigrants represented by David Bard and Frank Amigo. The new operators were tasked with updating the hotel, which had outdated plumbing and electrical wiring; dilapidated elevators; and dirty walls. In addition, Bard had to dispel rumors circulating among existing tenants, who believed that Bard had won the hotel in a poker game and wanted to raze it.

The United States Shipping Board leased the ground and second floors in late 1942, and members of the United States Maritime Service used the space as the U.S. Maritime Service Graduate Station. In 1944, architect Morris Whinston filed plans for $5,000 (equivalent to $73,000 in 2025) worth of alterations to the hotel. The Chelsea started to become associated with bohemianism during the 1940s and 1950s, and many original design details were removed during that era. A 1946 article in the Troy Record noted that artists lived in 25 of the Chelsea's 300 units and that the hotel no longer served traditional celebrities. The structure also hosted office tenants such as the World Congress of the Partisans of Peace on the ground floor. Bard had grown exasperated of the tenants' complaints by 1947, when he sold most of his shares to desk clerk Julius Krauss and plumber Joseph Gross, retaining five percent of his shares in the building. During this era, the hotel often served as a gathering place for left-wing and socialist activists; for instance, one of the ground-floor spaces was occupied by left-wing organizers who supported the United Nations Partition Plan for Palestine.

Bard again became involved in the hotel's operations by the early 1950s. By then, additional apartments had been subdivided, and the interiors had been significantly modified. The floors had been covered with linoleum; the walls had been painted over; and the skylight above the Chelsea's main staircase had been sealed. Bard, Gross, and Krauss jointly operated the hotel through the rest of this decade. The El Quijote restaurant, operated by a group of Spanish immigrants, moved to the Hotel Chelsea in 1955. The next year, inspectors found that the hotel had accumulated sixteen violations of city building codes. By the late 1950s, the Chelsea had begun to accept black residents, starting with the printmaker Robert Blackburn, and European artists were increasingly moving in. David Bard had sold all of his remaining hotels and spent large amounts of his time talking to the artists and authors who resided there. His son Stanley, who would later manage the hotel himself, recalled being jealous of the hotel because David spent all of his time there.

By the beginning of the 1960s, the Chelsea Hotel was known as the "Dowager of 23rd Street", and the surrounding area was populated with what Tippins referred to as "tawdry bars and low-rent offices". Nearly all of the entertainment venues in the area had been replaced with stores and apartments. Most of the hotel's occupants were long-term residents, who rarely moved away due to the low rental rates. Nouveaux Realistes artists also began to frequent the hotel in the 1960s, and pop artists often collaborated there by 1962. The New York Community Trust installed a plaque outside the building in 1962, detailing the hotel's history. Other plaques honoring specific residents were installed in the mid-1960s, including those for the author Thomas Wolfe and the playwright and poet Brendan Behan.

=== Stanley Bard operation ===
Stanley Bard became manager in 1964 after his father died. Stanley, who had been a plumber's assistant at the hotel since 1957 or 1958, was already familiar with many of the hotel's artistic residents when he assumed the managerial role. He began trying to attract artists who had been rejected from other hotels. Bard did not run advertisements, instead attracting new residents via word of mouth. The remaining co-owners, Joseph Gross and Julius Krauss, continued to work under Stanley Bard.

Stanley Bard was less strict than his predecessors, allowing residents to combine apartments on the basis of a handshake deal. Residents could install their own art, and pets might be allowed based on Stanley's whims. Actor Ethan Hawke, a onetime resident, recalled that Stanley charged residents different rates based on whether he liked them; a headline in The Wall Street Journal proclaimed that "If Stanley Bard likes your wife you'll get a room at the Chelsea". Bard generally had a lax attitude toward unpaid rent; he sometimes accepted paintings created by residents who were unable to pay rent, and he started displaying these works in the lobby. Another resident who could not afford rent was hired as a bellhop. Despite Bard's cavalier attitude toward guests' activities, he closely monitored all aspects of the hotel and sometimes refused to rent rooms to people who were disruptive or those that he disliked.

Although Bard sometimes did not pay attention to maintenance (leading one resident to say that "the place was held together with Scotch tape"), he helped curate the artistic community there, providing artists with materials and looking after their children. The hotel also came to be known as a place where creative and eccentric figures stayed. Bard stated in 1975 that he had friendships with tenants, not "tenant–landlord" relationships, and residents were free to walk into his office and talk with him. Bard had a bookcase in his office, with books written by residents. Tippins writes that Bard's inobtrusive management approach, along with the "self-directing population ... and members' willingness to live in the moment", created a strong artistic culture at the hotel.

==== 1960s and 1970s ====
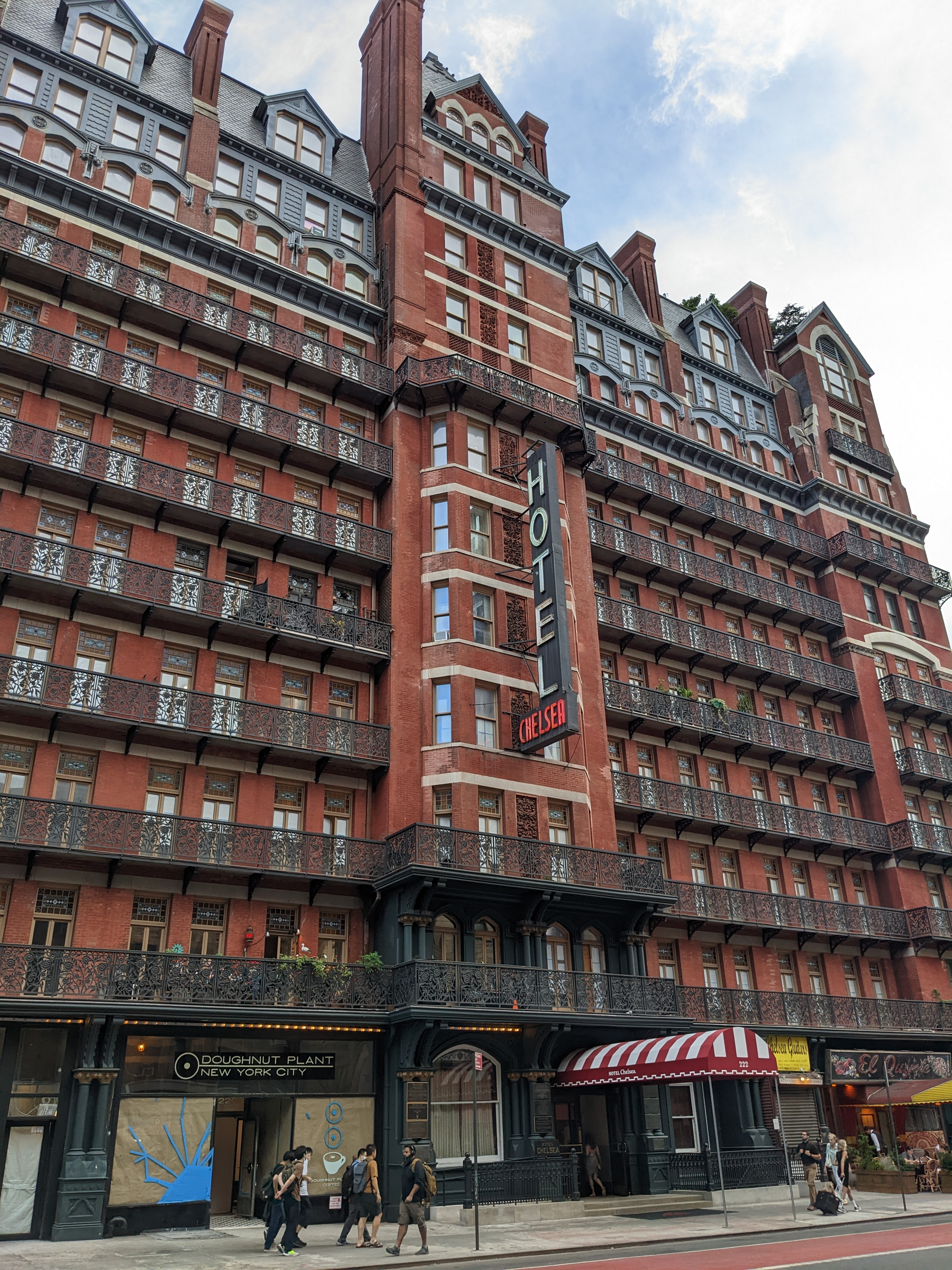
The hotel viewed from the northeast

By the mid-1960s, the hotel began to attract artists who frequented Andy Warhol's Factory studio, as well as rock musicians (who were not allowed in many other hotels). The Austin American described the hotel as having "400 rooms, 150 kitchens, and 150 fireplaces". The hotel was physically decaying during that time, though the facade was cleaned. The New York City Landmarks Preservation Commission (LPC) designated the Hotel Chelsea as a city landmark in March 1966, a decision ratified by the New York City Board of Estimate that June, despite opposition from a local planning board, which called the Chelsea a "shabby institution". The hotel, which was recognized for both architectural and historical significance, thus became one of the city's first official landmarks. Later the same year, Bard decided to redecorate the lobby after the release of Warhol's film Chelsea Girls drew attention to the hotel. The staircase was also cleaned in phases from top to bottom.

The popularity of Chelsea Girls—along with that of the album Blonde on Blonde, written by Chelsea Hotel resident Bob Dylan—attracted many aspiring artists and actors to the hotel during the late 1960s, in spite of its rundown condition. About half of the rooms were occupied by permanent residents by the early 1970s; although new residents had to pay at least $400 (equivalent to $3,300 in 2025) per month, older residents were protected by rent regulation and paid as little as $155 a month (equivalent to $1,300 in 2025). Variety magazine wrote that the Chelsea was "the only landmark building still doing business" from the time when the neighborhood was a major theatrical hub. The hotel's residents included many stage and film stars, artists, and "less conventional celebrities", who stayed despite the lack of modern amenities and the presence of pests. The cheapest units tended to have more issues. For many residents, however, there was "no life outside the Hotel", so they did not feel compelled to move. By the early 1970s, residents were increasingly unable to pay rent because of a general economic downturn, and Bard was forced to evict some residents to reduce expenses.

The hotel was in decline by the mid-1970s, with graffitied walls and a cockroach infestation. Residents removed some of the stained-glass windows and iron grates for scrap. It was common to see drug users in bathrooms and drug dealers in the hallways, and a brothel also operated openly within the hotel. Resident suicides and fires were frequent, as were robberies. Robbers held several residents hostage in a 1974 robbery, and the Chelsea was damaged in a 1978 fire that killed one resident. The death of Nancy Spungen at the hotel in 1978 brought negative attention, which continued when her boyfriend—Sid Vicious, who had been charged with her murder—died the next year. Nonetheless, the Chelsea's reputation as an artists' and authors' haven remained intact. Although there were frequent remarks about the "downright creepy" atmosphere, many residents remained in spite of the decline in both the hotel and the surrounding neighborhood. Bard dispelled concerns by saying that any major crime at the hotel was covered by the media due to the Chelsea's bohemian nature. According to Laurie Johnston of The New York Times, the hotel had "some glittery (and, to some old-liners, scary) clientele among rock musicians and such". The hotel was listed on the National Register of Historic Places in 1977.

==== 1980s to 2000s ====
Bard and the Chelsea's residents had planned a centennial celebration in November 1983, though the celebration was delayed by a year. Bard said at the time that he wanted "to keep the atmosphere kooky but nice, eccentric but beautiful", rather than updating the hotel to keep up with the surrounding neighborhood's gentrification. He accommodated residents' creativity and maintained close relationships with tenants, to the point that residents spoke with staff "as they were family" and walked behind Bard's desk to get their own mail. The hotel also attracted many tourists who wanted to experience its "eccentric" nature, although the staff mainly catered to long-term residents. The Chelsea was still cheap; nightly room rates were about one-third that of more upscale hotels uptown, and studios there were less expensive than others in the neighborhood. By the mid-1980s, the hotel largely catered to the punk subculture, and it was 80 percent residential by the late 1980s. The hotel building itself remained in a state of disrepair: for instance, a balcony fell off the facade in 1986, injuring two passersby. The balcony's collapse prompted a subsequent renovation of the building.

After Bard's children David and Michele became involved in the hotel's operation during the 1990s, they completed a $500,000 renovation of the facade in 1990 and renovated one of the sixth-floor rooms. David Bard upgraded the lobby's equipment, and the family subdivided the ground-level ladies' reception room into a set of offices, but they left the ceiling murals intact. The reception desk had been relocated to a niche off the main lobby. The Chelsea's reputation for "wildness" receded in the 1990s, though the hotel continued to attract artistic tenants under Bard's management. Long-term residents paid up to $3,000 a month in rent, while short-term guestrooms cost up to $295. Short-term guests also traveled to the hotel for a variety of reasons. Some wished to stay in rooms occupied by particular residents, while others traveled there because of their cheap rates. The guestrooms lacked modern amenities such as minibars, room service, and cable TV.

In spite of Stanley Bard's unorthodox approach to rent collection, the hotel's finances remained stable in the 1990s. The Bards continued to renovate selected rooms as part of a wide-ranging rehabilitation, and they also renovated the lobby. By the end of the 20th century, three-fourths of the hotel was occupied by long-term residents, and monthly rents ranged from $2,000 to $5,000. Bard wished to maintain the hotel's character, showing preference to artists over other potential tenants. There was also an art gallery and a basement bar named Serena.

Unfounded rumors of a potential sale were circulating by the end of the 20th century. Marlene Krauss, the daughter of Julius Krauss, told Bard to stop renewing long-term residents' leases in 2005. Meanwhile, longtime resident David Elder (the grandson of Joseph Gross and the son of playwright and screenwriter Lonne Elder III) filed a lawsuit in 2005 to have Bard removed as the hotel's manager. At the time, three-fifths of the hotel's 240–250 rooms were occupied by permanent residents. Temporary guestrooms and permanent residents' rooms were interspersed. As a result of rising expenses, there were fewer penurious artists living in the Chelsea compared to the mid- and late 20th century. A nightclub called the Star Lounge opened in the Chelsea's basement in early 2007.

=== Conversion to luxury hotel ===
==== Krauss–Elder operation ====
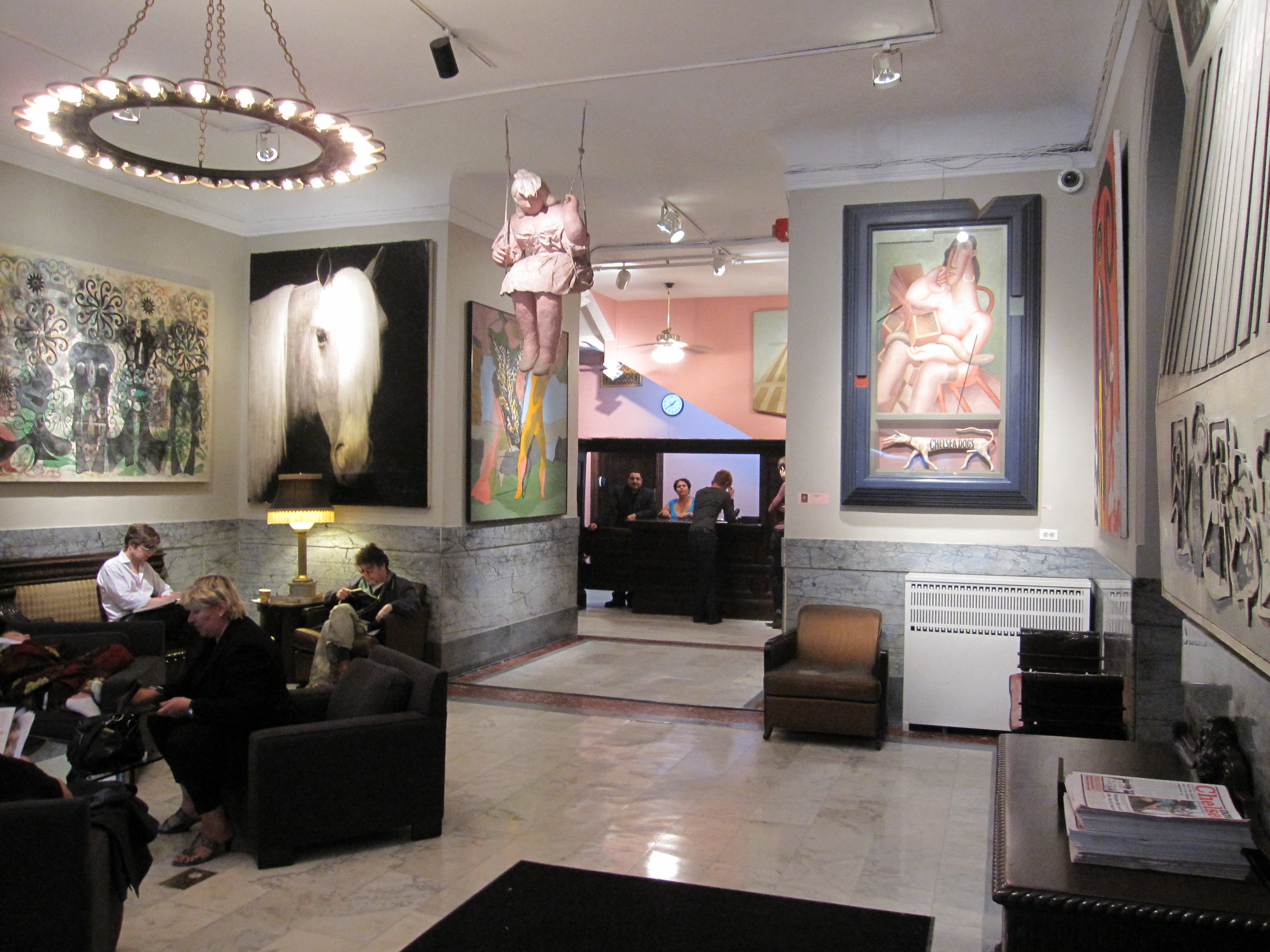
Lobby of the hotel in 2010

In 2007, an arbitrator ruled that Bard's family owned 58 percent of the hotel's value but that his partners had a majority stake in the operation. In addition, Bard was ordered to pay back $1 million and gave Marlene Krauss and David Elder control over the hotel for ten years. The hotel's board of directors ousted Bard in June 2007, after Krauss and Elder claimed that Bard had allowed tenants to stay even if they had fallen far behind on their rent. Krauss and Elder hired BD Hotels to manage the Chelsea. BD Hotels attempted to correct several violations of city building codes and obtain documentation on tenants who were not registered with the city government. The new operators also opened a basement lounge and restored the ballroom. Krauss wished to increase the number of short-term guests and renovate the retail space.

The hotel stopped leasing apartments in 2007; filmmaker Sam Bassett became the last long-term resident to sign a lease at the hotel. Many hotel residents feared that the plans would change the character of the hotel, one of the few remaining non-gentrified places in Chelsea, and they expressed concerns that the new manager was not accommodating toward them. At the time, Krauss and Elder were evicting tenants and were planning a renovation of the hotel. Elder denied that tenants were being targeted, saying that all of the evicted tenants had failed to pay rent; according to BD Hotels officials, some tenants owed more than $10,000. BD Hotels was fired in April 2008 and subsequently filed a wrongful dismissal lawsuit against the hotel's operators. Andrew Tilley was hired to manage the hotel in June 2008 and continued to serve eviction notices to tenants. The hotel was involved in other controversies such as a disagreement over the demolition of an apartment once occupied by Bob Dylan. Tilley resigned after seven months, citing tenant harassment.

Elder took over direct management of the hotel in 2009. Under Elder's management, the hotel phased out long-term leases in favor of 25-day leases. By 2010, ninety long-term residents remained; another forty had moved out during the previous three years. A nightclub known as the Chelsea Room opened in the basement that October, after the former Star Lounge's space had been gutted. The Chelsea's 15 shareholders put the hotel up for sale in October 2010, when there were 125 short-term guestrooms and 100 apartments. Real-estate experts estimated that a buyer would have to spend hundreds of thousands of dollars to renovate each room, overcoming tenant opposition and restrictions posed by the hotel's city-landmark status. Stanley Bard's son David made a bid to buy the Chelsea, as did developer Aby Rosen and hoteliers Ian Schrager and André Balazs. A Doughnut Plant shop opened at the hotel in early 2011.

==== Chetrit and Scheetz operation ====
Real estate developer Joseph Chetrit announced in May 2011 that he had bought the hotel for $80 million. Chetrit stopped taking reservations for new guests that July and officially took title to the hotel the next month. Gene Kaufman was hired to design a renovation of the Chelsea, which was funded by an $85 million loan from Natixis. Kaufman intended to change the room layouts and renovate vacant retail space in the basement and ground floor. Residents protected by state rent regulation laws were allowed to remain, but the staff were fired. Chetrit also moved to evict a tattoo parlor and some of the non-rent-regulated residents. That September, resident Zoe Pappas formed the Chelsea Tenants Association, which about half of the remaining residents joined. The Chelsea's managers ordered that all artwork be placed into storage in November, prompting more tenant complaints; a rooftop garden tended by residents was also destroyed.

From 2011 to 2013, residents filed a large number of lawsuits against Chetrit. Tenants complained that the project was creating health hazards, although the city's Building Department found no major violations of building codes. Following a lawsuit in December 2011, a state court ordered Chetrit to clean the air in the hotel. King & Grove Hotels was hired in January 2012 to operate the hotel, and Chetrit proposed a rooftop addition shortly afterward, which the LPC approved despite concerns from residents. Chetrit was ordered to fix additional building violations in May 2012 after tenants alleged that the renovation created toxic dust and allowed mold and rust to spread. Other tenant lawsuits included a dispute over a deceased tenant's artwork and a complaint over disrupted gas, heat, and hot water service. In addition, Chetrit sued Bard in early 2013, claiming that Bard had overrepresented the hotel's value.

Chetrit, David Bistricer and King & Grove Hotels CEO, Ed Scheetz co-owned the hotel until August 2013, when Scheetz took over the Chelsea Hotel. King & Grove and existing residents agreed on a rent settlement the next month, in which residents could stay in upgraded apartments. Scheetz continued to evict other tenants who had fallen behind on rent. At the time, there were 65 remaining apartments and 170 guestrooms. Chetrit canceled all of the work permits for the Chelsea's renovation at the end of 2013, and all work was temporarily stopped until King & Grove applied for new permits. Scheetz also hired Marvel Architects to modify Kaufman's designs, prompting a lawsuit from Kaufman.

After rebranding King & Grove as Chelsea Hotels in 2014, Scheetz bought the El Quijote restaurant that year. The Chelsea Hotel Storefront Gallery also opened at ground level in 2014. Following a campaign led by residents, Scheetz agreed to preserve a first-floor suite once occupied by the poet Dylan Thomas. Scheetz also wished to renovate 52 remaining apartments, which were occupied by 83 tenants. Accordingly, he offered to buy out their apartments, move them to the lower stories, or move them temporarily to the Martha Washington Hotel. By mid-2015, Scheetz and his partners Bill Ackman, Joseph Steinberg, and Wheelock Street Capital had spent $185 million on renovations, which were not expected to be completed for two years. Scheetz had withdrawn from the Chelsea Hotel project entirely by March 2016, after a series of budget overruns and delays, although his partners retained a stake in the project.

==== BD Hotels takeover ====
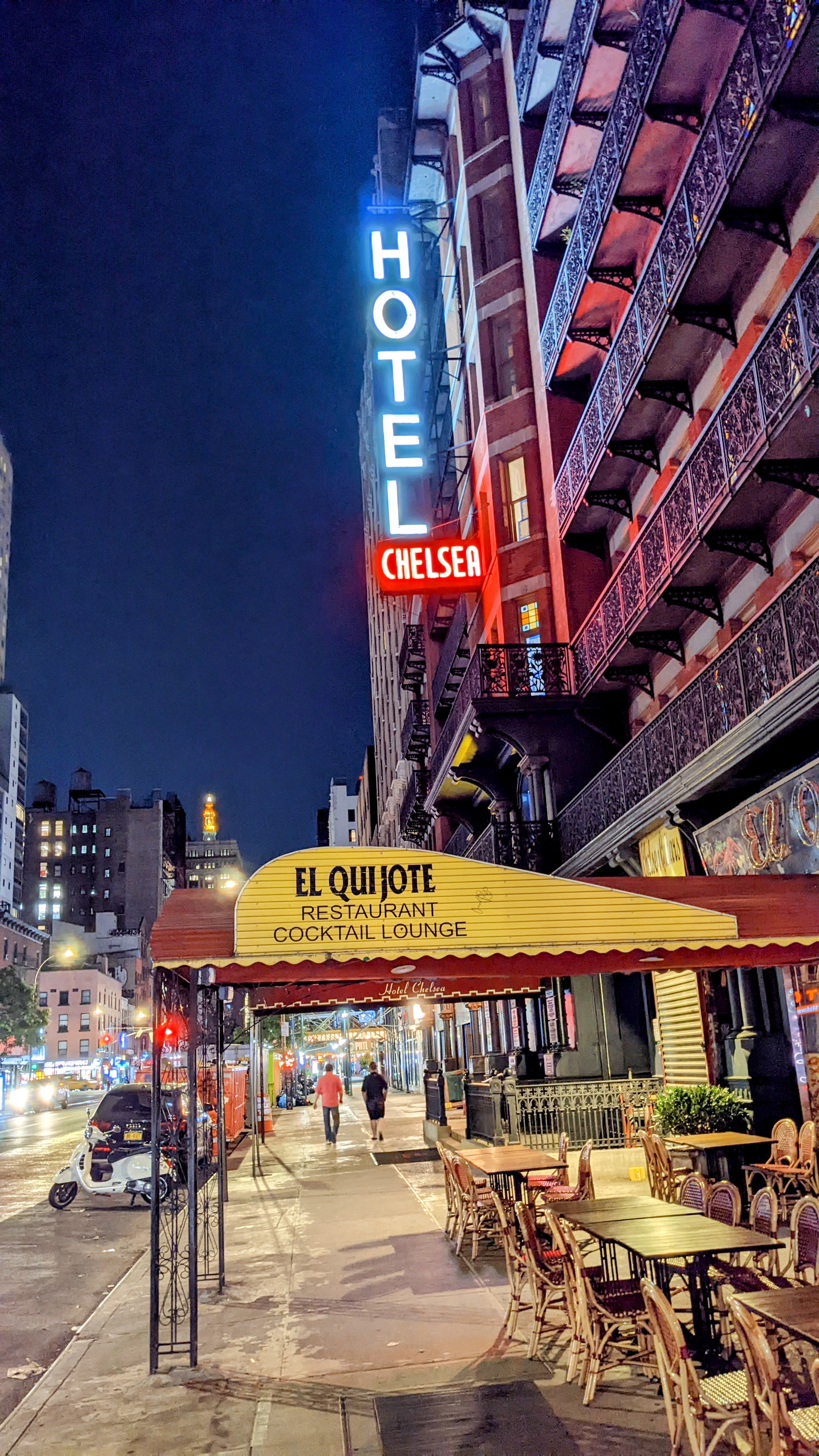
El Quijote and Hotel Chelsea at night in July 2022

BD Hotels took over the hotel's operation that July and began working to renovate 120 of the hotel rooms, as well as restoring or preserving the apartments of 51 existing tenants. At the time, the renovation was planned to be completed in 2018. SIR Chelsea LLC, led by Sean MacPherson, Ira Drukier, and Richard Born, bought the Chelsea Hotel in October 2016 for $250 million. MacPherson led additional renovations at the hotel, including restoration of artwork and design features, as well as new public areas like a bar and spa on the roof. To convince mayor Bill de Blasio to approve further changes, Drukier and Born sent tens of thousands of dollars to various funds for de Blasio. Bard's collection of paintings was sold off in 2017 after he died, and work was again halted that year when the city found high concentrations of lead in the dust. By then, two single room occupancy apartments remained in the Chelsea, and many tenants had temporarily relocated. Some of the hotel's original doors were removed and sold at auction in 2018.

El Quijote was closed temporarily in March 2018 for renovations. The next year, several holdout tenants filed a lawsuit to retain control of their apartments. The renovation project was halted, and the New York City Department of Housing Preservation and Development mandated that the hotel's owners obtain a certificate of no harassment. Work on the renovation had mostly stalled by early 2020 due to a harassment lawsuit against the owners, though a state judge dismissed that suit. The city government also contended that the owners had harassed the tenants, and further lawsuits were filed throughout that year. Other residents, who wanted the hotel's renovation to be completed quickly, sided with the owners. Work resumed in early 2021, after the city government said that January that it would not pursue a tenant-harassment investigation against the owners. The hotel's owners sued the city in May 2021, claiming that the construction delays had cost them $100 million.

El Quijote reopened in February 2022, and the Hotel Chelsea soft-reopened to transient guests the next month. Initially, the rooms were rented at a discount while work continued. The Bard Room opened at ground level in June 2022, and the hotel fully reopened in mid-2022. At the time, there were still 40 permanent residents, and the cheapest suite cost $700 per night. Disputes continued over the preservation of Dylan Thomas's apartment, and the hotel's owners still had an open lawsuit against the city. Café Chelsea, a French bistro, opened within the hotel in July 2023. The hotel's neon sign and stained-glass windows, which had been removed during the 2020s renovation, were auctioned off in late 2024. A Japanese restaurant, Teruko, opened at the hotel in March 2025.

== Notable residents ==
Over the years, the Chelsea has become particularly well-known for its residents, who have come from all social classes. The New York Times described the hotel in 2001 as a "roof for creative heads", given the large number of such personalities who have stayed at the Chelsea; the previous year, the same newspaper had characterized the list of tenants as "living history". The journalist Pete Hamill characterized the hotel's clientele as "radicals in the 1930s, British sailors in the 40s, Beats in the 50s, hippies in the 60s, decadent poseurs in the 70s". Although early tenants were wealthy, the Chelsea attracted less well-off tenants by the mid-20th century, and many writers, musicians, and artists lived at the Hotel Chelsea when they were short on money. Accordingly, the Chelsea's guest list had almost zero overlap with that of the more fashionable Plaza Hotel crosstown.

New York magazine wrote that "people who lived in the hotel slept together as often as they celebrated holidays together", particularly under Stanley Bard's tenure. Despite the high number of notable people associated with the Chelsea, its residents typically desired privacy and frowned upon those who used their relationships with their neighbors to further their own careers.

=== Literature ===
The Hotel Chelsea has housed numerous literary figures, some of whom wrote their books there. Arthur C. Clarke wrote 2001: A Space Odyssey while staying at the Chelsea, calling the hotel his "spiritual home" despite its condition. Thomas Wolfe lived in the hotel before his death in 1938, writing several books such as You Can't Go Home Again; he often walked around the halls to gain inspiration for his writing. William S. Burroughs also lived at the Chelsea. While living at the Chelsea, Edgar Lee Masters wrote 18 poetry books, often wandering the hotel for hours.

Welsh poet Dylan Thomas (who lived with his wife Caitlin Thomas) was staying in room 205 when he became ill and died in 1953, while American poet Delmore Schwartz spent the last few years of his life in seclusion at the Chelsea before he died in 1966. Irish playwright and poet Brendan Behan, a severe alcoholic who had been ejected from the Algonquin Hotel, lived at the hotel for several months before his death in 1964. Many poets of the Beat poetry movement also lived at the Chelsea before the Beat Hotel in Paris became popular.

Other authors, writers, and journalists who stayed or lived at the hotel have included:

- Henry Abbey, poet
- Nelson Algren, writer
- Léonie Adams, poet; lived with husband William Troy
- Sherwood Anderson, writer
- Ben Lucien Burman, writer
- Henri Chopin, poet and musician
- Ira Cohen, poet and filmmaker
- Gregory Corso, poet
- Hart Crane, poet
- Quentin Crisp, writer and actor
- Jane Cunningham Croly, journalist
- Katherine Dunn, novelist and journalist
- Edward Eggleston, writer
- James T. Farrell, novelist
- Allen Ginsberg, poet
- John Giorno, poet
- Maurice Girodias, publisher
- Pete Hamill, journalist
- Bernard Heidsieck, poet
- O. Henry, writer
- Herbert Huncke, poet
- Clifford Irving, novelist and reporter
- Charles R. Jackson, author
- Theodora Keogh, novelist
- Jack Kerouac, writer
- Suzanne La Follette, journalist
- John La Touche, lyricist
- Jakov Lind, novelist
- Mary McCarthy, novelist and political activist
- Arthur Miller, playwright
- Jessica Mitford, author
- Vladimir Nabokov, novelist
- Eugene O'Neill, playwright
- Joseph O'Neill, novelist
- Claude Pélieu, poet and artist
- Rene Ricard, poet
- James Schuyler, poet
- Sam Shepard, playwright and actor
- Valerie Solanas, writer
- Benjamin Stolberg, publicist and author
- Richard Suskind, children's writer
- William Troy, critic; lived with wife Léonie Adams
- Mark Twain, writer
- Gore Vidal, writer
- Arnold Weinstein, librettist
- Tennessee Williams, playwright
- Yevgeny Yevtushenko, poet

=== Entertainers ===
The hotel has been home to actors, film directors, producers, and comedians. The actress Sara Lowndes moved to a room adjoining that of musician Bob Dylan before the two married in 1965. Edie Sedgwick, an actress and Warhol superstar, set her room on fire by accident in 1967, while Viva, another Warhol superstar, lived at the Chelsea with her daughter Gaby Hoffmann. Members of the Squat Theatre Company also stayed in the hotel in the 1970s while performing nearby.

Other entertainment personalities who lived or stayed at the Chelsea include:

- Martine Barrat, filmmaker
- Sarah Bernhardt, actress, slept in a custom coffin
- Russell Brand, actor and comedian
- Peter Brook, director
- Shirley Clarke, filmmaker
- Laura Sedgwick Collins, actress
- Bette Davis, actress
- Abel Ferrara, filmmaker
- Jane Fonda, actress
- Miloš Forman, filmmaker
- Ethan Hawke, actor and film director
- Mitch Hedberg, comedian
- Dave Hill, comedian
- Dennis Hopper, filmmaker
- John Houseman, actor, lived in a penthouse
- Michael Imperioli, actor
- Eddie Izzard, comedian
- Stanley Kubrick, director
- Lillie Langtry, actress
- Carl Lee, actor
- Gerard Malanga, actor, filmmaker, poet, and musician
- Jonas Mekas, filmmaker
- Ondine, actor
- Al Pacino, actor
- Isabella Rossellini, actress
- Annie Russell, actress
- Lillian Russell, actress
- Elaine Stritch, actress
- Donald Sutherland, actor
- Eva Tanguay, actress
- Aurélia Thierrée, actress
- Rosa von Praunheim, filmmaker
- Mary Woronov, actress

=== Musicians ===
Composer and critic Virgil Thomson, once described by The New York Times as the hotel's "most illustrious tenant", lived at the hotel for nearly five decades before his death in 1989; Thompson persuaded Stanley Bard in 1977 to let composer Gerald Busby stay at the hotel where Busby still lived in 2015. The composer George Kleinsinger lived with his pet animals on the tenth floor. The activist Stormé DeLarverie was also a long-term resident, as was the actress Candy Darling.

The Chelsea was particularly popular among rock musicians and rock and roll musicians in the 1970s. These included Sid Vicious of the Sex Pistols, who allegedly stabbed his girlfriend Nancy Spungen to death at the hotel in 1978; after Vicious's death, their room was split into two units to prevent the room from being turned into a shrine. Numerous rock bands frequented the Chelsea as well, including the Allman Brothers, the Band, Big Brother and the Holding Company, the Paul Butterfield Blues Band, the Byrds, Country Joe and the Fish, Jefferson Airplane, Lovin' Spoonful, Moby Grape, the Mothers of Invention, Quicksilver Messenger Service, Sly and the Family Stone, and the Stooges. The Kills wrote much of their album No Wow at the Chelsea prior to its release in 2005. The Grateful Dead once performed on the roof.

Other prominent musicians that resided in the Chelsea include:

- Ryan Adams, singer-songwriter
- Joan Baez, folk musician
- Chet Baker, jazz trumpeter and vocalist
- Leonard Bernstein, composer, conductor, pianist
- John Cale, musician, composer, and record producer
- Leonard Cohen, singer-songwriter
- Alice Cooper, rock singer
- Chick Corea, composer, pianist, keyboardist, bandleader, and percussionist
- Julie Delpy, actress and songwriter
- Donovan, multi-instrumentalist and songwriter
- Bob Dylan, singer-songwriter
- Marianne Faithfull, rock singer
- Alexander Frey, conductor, pianist, organist, composer
- Jimi Hendrix, guitarist
- Robert Hunter, lyricist
- Abdullah Ibrahim, pianist and composer
- Janis Joplin, singer
- Jobriath, singer
- Madonna, singer and actress; shot photographs for her 1992 book Sex in room 822
- Bette Midler, actress
- Buddy Miles, drummer and singer
- Joni Mitchell, singer-songwriter
- Jim Morrison, singer-songwriter
- Nico, singer
- Phil Ochs, songwriter
- Édith Piaf, singer
- Iggy Pop, rock musician
- Dee Dee Ramone, punk rock musician
- Robbie Robertson, singer-songwriter and guitarist
- Ravi Shankar, musician
- Patti Smith, singer
- Johnny Thunders, guitarist and singer-songwriter
- Rufus Wainwright, singer-songwriter and composer
- Kurt Cobain, guitarist and singer-songwriter
- Courtney Love, singer-songwriter
- Tom Waits, jazz musician, composer, songwriter
- Edgar Winter, multi-instrumentalist
- Johnny Winter, guitarist and singer
- Frank Zappa, guitarist, composer, and bandleader

=== Visual artists ===
Many visual artists, including painters, sculptors, and photographers, have resided at the Chelsea. The painter John Sloan lived in one of the top-floor duplexes until his death in 1951, painting portraits of both the Chelsea and nearby buildings. Joseph Glasco lived at the Chelsea in 1949 and then lived there on recurring visits and painted Chelsea Hotel (1992) there. During the 1960s, acolytes of the polymath Harry Everett Smith frequently gathered around his apartment. The painter Alphaeus Philemon Cole lived there for 35 years until his death in 1988 when, at the age of 112, he was the oldest verified man alive. The artist Vali Myers lived at the hotel from 1971 to 2014, while conceptual artist Bettina Grossman lived in the Chelsea from 1970 to her death in 2021. Although Andy Warhol never lived in the hotel, many of his associates did.

Other artists who have lived at the Chelsea include:

- Hawk Alfredson, painter
- Joe Andoe, painter
- Karel Appel, painter and sculptor
- Arman, painter
- Brigid Berlin, artist and Warhol superstar
- Robert Blackburn, printmaker
- Arthur Bowen Davies, painter
- Frank Bowling, painter
- Henri Cartier-Bresson, photographer
- Doris Chase, video artist
- Ching Ho Cheng, painter
- Bernard Childs, painter
- Christo and Jeanne-Claude, installation artists
- Francesco Clemente, artist
- Robert Crumb, cartoonist
- Charles Melville Dewey, painter
- Jim Dine, artist
- Claudio Edinger, photographer
- William Eggleston, photographer
- Jorge Fick, mixed-media artist
- André François, cartoonist
- Herbert Gentry, artist
- Alberto Giacometti, painter
- Joseph Glasco, abstract artist
- Brion Gysin, multimedia artist
- Childe Hassam, painter
- David Hockney, artist
- Alain Jacquet, artist
- Jasper Johns, painter, sculptor, draftsman, and printmaker
- Leo Katz, muralist
- Yves Klein, artist
- Willem de Kooning, painter
- Nicola L, multidisciplinary artist
- Ryah Ludins, painter
- Robert Mapplethorpe, photographer; lived with Patti Smith
- Inge Morath, photographer
- Charles R. Macauley, cartoonist
- Maryan S. Maryan, post-expressionist painter; died in his hotel room in 1977
- Kenneth Noland, abstract painter
- Claes Oldenburg, sculptor
- Elizabeth Peyton, contemporary artist
- Jackson Pollock, abstract painter
- Martial Raysse, artist
- David Remfry, painter
- Diego Rivera, artist
- Larry Rivers, artist
- Mark Rothko, abstract painter
- Niki de Saint Phalle, sculptor, painter, and filmmaker
- Julian Schnabel, artist<
- Moses Soyer, painter; died in his studio in 1974
- Philip Taaffe, artist; lived in Virgil Thompson's old apartment
- Jean Tinguely, sculptor
- Nahum Tschacbasov, expressionist artist
- Stella Waitzkin, artist
- Tom Wesselmann, artist
- Brett Whiteley, artist
- Rufus Fairchild Zogbaum, painter

=== Other figures ===
One early resident of the Chelsea, U.S. congressman-elect Andrew J. Campbell, died at his apartment in 1894 before he could be sworn in. The choreographer Katherine Dunham, who rehearsed at the hotel in the 1960s, was one of the few dance–associated figures to stay in the Chelsea. Communist Party USA leader Elizabeth Gurley Flynn lived at the hotel, as did event producer Susanne Bartsch.

Several fashion designers have lived at the Chelsea. Charles James, credited with being America's first couturier who influenced fashion in the 1940s and 1950s, moved into the Chelsea in 1964. The designer Elizabeth Hawes lived in the Chelsea until her death in 1971. Billy Reid used one of the Chelsea's rooms as an office, studio, and showroom starting in 1998. After returning to New York City in 2001, Natalie "Alabama" Chanin briefly lived in the Chelsea Hotel.

== Impact ==
=== Critical reception ===
==== Cultural commentary ====
Life magazine characterized the hotel in 1964 as "New York's most illustrious third-rate hotel"; the same year, The New York Times described the Chelsea Hotel as having "long represented the cultural mood that is now spreading through the West 20s". Another journalist called the hotel in 1965 an "Ellis Island of the avant-garde". A Boston Globe reporter said that, while the hotel was internally known as an artists' residence, "those on the outside are confused by the names and the rococo facade of stories that have dragged the Chelsea down like an old roue to the bottom of history". Donna Hilts of The Washington Post wrote in 1975 that "the beatnik '50s, the hip '60s, the freaky '70s—each found a way of appreciating the freedom, the tradition and the old rug coziness of the Chelsea". Paul Goldberger of The New York Times wrote in 1981 that the Chelsea "has had a history that is something of a cross between the Algonquin Hotel and a crash pad", and British reporter Peter Ackroyd wrote in 1983 that the Chelsea was reputed as "one of the least stuffy hotels in New York". A Chicago Tribune reporter said in 1983 that the Chelsea "has certainly set standards of its own".

In 1993, The New York Times wrote: "Stubbornly resistant to change, the Chelsea is—still—hip." The same reporter described the hotel as a "Tower of Babel of creativity and bad behavior" that nonetheless remained successful. In 1995, The Philadelphia Inquirer contrasted the hotel with the more upscale Algonquin Hotel in Midtown Manhattan, which was also known for its literary scene. The Washington Post described the hotel's lax management in 1999 as "a factor that attracted a stellar crop of artists in its century of operation", while a GQ writer said the same year that "there are two Statues of Liberty on New York—the one for immigrants out by Ellis Island and the one for weirdos at 222 West 23rd Street". In the 2000s, the Irish Times said that the Chelsea was "reputed to be the last Bohemian place on earth". Variety described the hotel as having "long been synonymous with the bohemian scene", and The Advertiser of Adelaide wrote that "The Chelsea exists as a microcosm of New York."

The New York Observer wrote in 2010 that the Chelsea's "hulking physicality" distinguished the hotel from neighboring structures, though "it's the litany of cultural touchstones in (or formerly in) residence that makes it the Chelsea". According to The Telegraph, the hotel "had something that no amount of money or interior decoration could buy: a singular style and a unique legend". Sherill Tippins said in 2022, "It's hard to imagine what American culture would be like if we hadn't had the Chelsea. It's an enormous factory of creative thought and ideas." The New York Times compared the Christodora House in the East Village to the Hotel Chelsea, and Town and Country described the hotel as "a symbol of New York City's vibrant culture".

==== Architectural and hotel commentary ====
When the hotel was completed, a writer for the New-York Tribune regarded the hotel's "finish and appointments" as a "very close second" to that of the Navarro Flats on Central Park South, while the Courier Journal described the Chelsea as "the latest triumph of civilization". According to David Goodman Croly, the building's design signified the fact that New Yorkers had become "more capable of organization, more sociable, more gregarious than before". The Sun wrote that the Chelsea was one of numerous "living temples of humanity" that could be used as a model for urban apartment living.

In the mid-20th century, the hotel's decor was the subject of negative commentary. Yevgeny Yevtushenko likened the smell of his room to the Dachau concentration camp, and Arthur Miller said the decor was more akin to "Guatemalan maybe, or outer Queens" than a "grand hotel". Donna Hilts said in 1975 that the hotel's brick facade "reminds a visitor of a Victorian dowager, down on her luck, cracked and faded, but still trying to keep up appearances". The Associated Press wrote in 1978 that the hotel's lobby was "singularly unprepossessing", with tenants' art juxtaposed with the original fireplace, while a Newsday reporter described the space as "a museum of the anarchic monstrosities of the 1960s". Paul Goldberger praised the architecture but disliked its neon sign, saying that "the building is so strong as a work of architecture that the sign compromises it not a bit". Ackroyd said in 1983 that his room was "not particularly comfortable [but] has a grim splendour of its own".

Terry Trucco wrote for The New York Times in 1991 that her room "got plenty of light and was oddly cheerful", though she described the furniture as old and the bathroom as "ghastly"; a writer for The Boston Globe said the same year that the corridors felt like "an institution in long decline". A writer for The Palm Beach Post, reviewing the hotel in 1996, said that the rooms were large but "not especially clean". The New York Times wrote in 1998 that the hotel's hallways resembled a street in Venice or Rome and that the apartments were "furnished in an artistic collision of styles". The Observer of London called the Chelsea's lobby "an overgrown taxidermist's Valhalla" in 2000. The Poughkeepsie Journal wrote in 2002 that the Chelsea stood "in the middle of the block with an air of quiet dignity", with its balconies being its most prominent feature. A New York Times reviewer wrote in 2005 that, despite the hotel's worn-down condition, its "grungy elegance" was preferable to chain hotels' "soulless architecture".

After the hotel reopened in 2022, the Financial Times wrote, "Depending on one's nostalgist leanings, the new Hotel Chelsea is either a travesty of history, or instantly on the must-do list." A critic for Condé Nast Traveler wrote, "The design isn't too flashy, isn't too rock-and-roll, isn't too homey, yet it has a lick of each of these elements." The first edition of the Michelin Keys Guide, in 2024, ranked the Hotel Chelsea as a "one-key" hotel, the third-highest accolade granted by the guide. The same year, Suitcase magazine wrote that "the spirit of Philip Hubert's socialist-leaning vision [was] very much alive", with many of the original architectural decorations being retained.

=== Popular culture ===
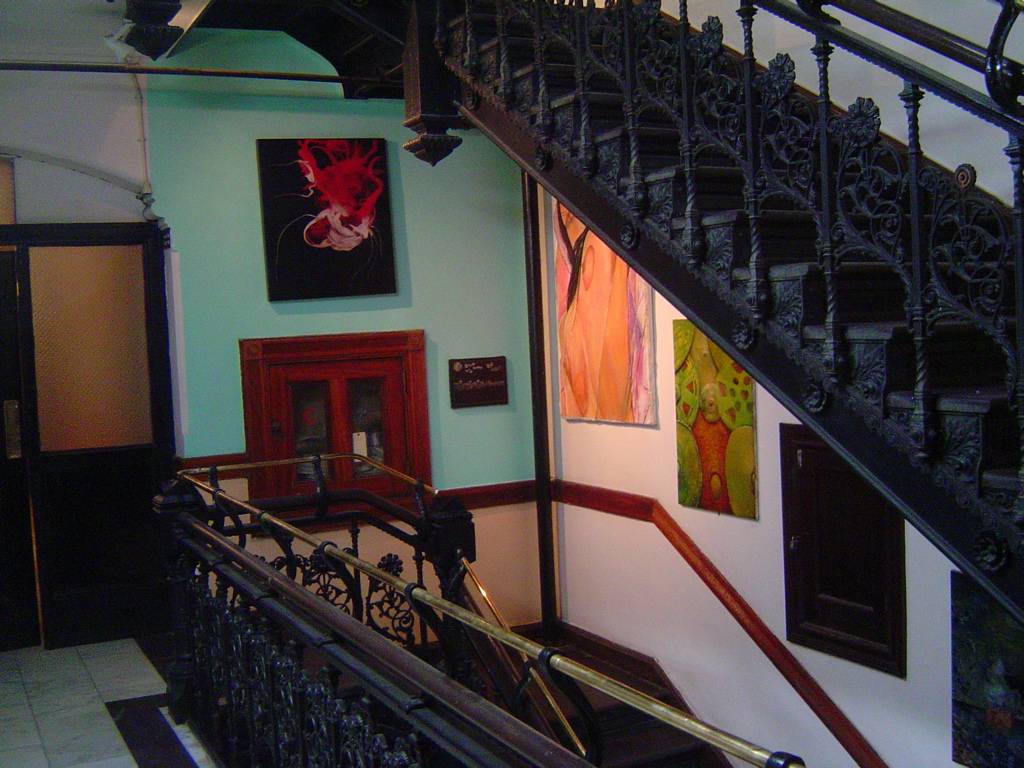
The hotel's stairs

The Chelsea has been the setting or inspiration for many works of popular media. In addition, many art events and photography shoots have taken place at the hotel, and several films have been shot there as well.

==== Films and television ====
The hotel has been featured in several documentaries. Its history was chronicled in the 2008 documentary Chelsea on the Rocks, directed by Abel Ferrara, and the 2022 documentary Dreaming Walls: Inside the Chelsea Hotel, executive-produced by Martin Scorsese. An episode of the TV series An American Family, aired on PBS in 1973, was mostly filmed at the Chelsea, as was an episode of the documentary series Arena. The 1986 film Sid and Nancy, by Alex Cox, chronicled the lives of residents Sid Vicious and Nancy Spungen and the circumstances leading up to Spungen's murder in the hotel.

The Chelsea has also been used as a setting for other films. Andy Warhol and Paul Morrissey directed Chelsea Girls (1966), a film about Warhol's Factory regulars and their lives at the hotel, and Shirley Clarke's 1967 film Portrait of Jason also used the hotel as a setting. Parts of Sandy Daley's 1971 short film Robert Having His Nipple Pierced were filmed at the Chelsea on a budget of less than $2,000. Ethan Hawke directed the 2001 film Chelsea Walls about a new generation of artists living at the hotel. Other films with scenes shot at the Chelsea include Tally Brown, New York (1979); 9½ Weeks (1986); Anna (1987); Léon: The Professional (1994); and the horror film Hotel Chelsea (2009).

==== Music ====
The hotel was featured in many songs. Joni Mitchell is sometimes cited as having written the song "Chelsea Morning" about her room in the hotel. (Note: New York magazine writes that "Chelsea Morning" was about a different apartment on 16th Street.) Leonard Cohen and Janis Joplin had an affair there in 1968 (as memorialized in a plaque installed there in 2009), and Cohen later wrote the song "Chelsea Hotel", as well as another version titled "Chelsea Hotel No. 2", about it. Bob Dylan wrote the songs "Visions of Johanna" and "Sad Eyed Lady of the Lowlands" there, mentioning this in "Sara". Additionally, Nico's "Chelsea Girls" is about the hotel and its inhabitants. Jorma Kaukonen wrote the song "Third Week in the Chelsea" for Jefferson Airplane's 1971 album Bark after spending three weeks living in the Chelsea. Other songs featuring the hotel include "Midnight in Chelsea" by Bon Jovi, "Hotel Chelsea Nights" by Ryan Adams, "Chelsea Hotel '78" by Alejandro Escovedo, and "Bruce Wayne Campbell Interviewed on the Roof of the Chelsea Hotel, 1979" by Okkervil River, and "The Tortured Poets Department" by Taylor Swift.

==== Print media ====
Stillman Foster Kneeland wrote a poem in 1914, "Roofland", which commemorated the nights that he spent on the Chelsea's roof garden. Similarly, Edgar Lee Masters wrote an ode to the hotel while living there. Arthur Miller wrote a short piece, "The Chelsea Affect", describing life at the Chelsea Hotel in the early 1960s. Nicolaia Rips wrote the memoir Trying to Float: Coming of Age in the Chelsea Hotel in 2016.

The hotel has been the subject of several nonfiction accounts and photographical books. Robert Baral's 1965 book Turn West on 23rd devoted a chapter to the hotel, while Claudio Edinger's 1983 book Chelsea Hotel consisted of photographs of the hotel and its residents. Florence Turner's 1987 book At the Chelsea doubled as a memoir and a description of the hotel's occupants. Ed Hamilton, who moved into the Chelsea in 1995, launched the Living with Legends blog about the hotel in 2005; information from that blog was collated in the 2007 book Legends of the Chelsea Hotel. The hotel was also described in Sherill Tippins's 2013 book Inside the Dream Palace, as well as Victoria Cohen's 2013 coffee table book Hotel Chelsea. Photographs of the building were shown in Colin Miller's 2019 book Hotel Chelsea: Living in the Last Bohemian Haven and Albert Scopin's 2026 book Chelsea Hotel.

Several pieces of fiction have been set at the hotel, such as Stuart Cloete's 1947 short story The Blast, describing New York City after a nuclear holocaust. Henry Van Dyke's 1969 book Blood of Strawberries, a black comedy, revolved around a group of fictional bohemians who lived at the hotel. Dee Dee Ramone wrote the book Chelsea Horror Hotel in 2001, and Fiona Davis used it as a setting in her 2019 novel Chelsea Girls. Joseph O'Neill wrote the novel Netherland partly based on his experience living at the hotel.

==== Other works ====
The Chelsea hosted a multimedia festival in 1989, At the Chelsea, which celebrated the hotel's history with theatrical shows, music, and performance art. Nicole Burdette's play Chelsea Walls, first performed in 1990, was the basis for the similarly named 2001 film. In 2013, Welsh choreographers Jessica Cohen and Jim Ennis choreographed a dance piece inspired by the Chelsea Hotel; the piece depicts four fictional couples, who are loosely based on real-life hotel residents. The multimedia performance "Young Artists at the Chelsea", dramatizing the lives of some of the residents, was presented in a gallery in the hotel in 2015.

== See also ==
- List of New York City Designated Landmarks in Manhattan from 14th to 59th Streets
- National Register of Historic Places listings in Manhattan from 14th to 59th Streets
