= Alfredson =

Alfredson is a surname meaning "son of Alfred". Notable people with the surname include:

- Daniel Alfredson (born 1959), Swedish film director
- Hans Alfredson (1931–2017), Swedish actor, film director, writer and comedian
- Hawk Alfredson (born 1960), Swedish artist
- Tomas Alfredson (born 1965), Swedish film director

== See also ==
- Alfredsson
