= Jorge Fick =

American painter (1932–2004)

Jorge Fick (1932–2004) was an American painter who is known for his Pod series of large-scale oil paintings "depicting semi-abstract symbols of growth and regeneration". Pod paintings blend abstraction, cartoons and pop art. Fick was influenced by eastern religions such as Zen Buddhism, the culture of Pueblo peoples, and new visual imagery.

== Early life ==
Fick was born and raised in Detroit, Michigan, to Roman Catholic parents who sent him to Cass Technical School, a public trade school in the inner city of Detroit, from 1947 through 1950, where he learned manual skills and graphic design, and gained access to the art collection of the Detroit Institute of Arts. He spent 1950 and 1951 at Society of Arts and Crafts Detroit, MI. Later that year, he attended Mexican Art School in Guadalajara, Mexico. After art school, he changed his first name from George to Jorge in homage to his Hispanic culture.

== Black Mountain College ==
Fick attended the Black Mountain College from 1952 until 1955. He was one of the few students who officially graduated with a BFA. At the college he studied under Franz Kline, Philip Guston, Jack Tworkov, Joseph Fiore, Esteban Vicente, and Peter Voulkos. Fick developed a lifelong bond with classmate and poet Robert Creeley, who introduced Fick to Creeley's Beat contemporaries. Creeley titled the paintings in Fick's 1980s Haiku Series.

After graduation in 1955, he moved to New York City to share a studio with Franz Kline, his painting mentor from college. Kline was said to have introduced Fick to Abstract expressionism. While still at school in 1953, Kline invited Fick to exhibit at the legendary Stable Gallery. Fick was fully immersed in the art and literature scene of the 1950s. In 1953 he lent a suit to writer and poet Dylan Thomas, whom was a fellow guest of Fick's at Hotel Chelsea.

== New Mexico ==
In 1958, Fick moved to Santa Fe, New Mexico, and helped foster an art community in the southwest. In 1962, he shared a studio with the sculptor John Chamberlain. Throughout the 1960s, Fick printed many environmental photographs by Eliot Porter. Fick practiced color theory, a skill he honed doing dye transfers for Porter, and as a color consultant to the designer, Alexander Girard, with whom, he collaborated on his project for Braniff Airlines.

Fick and his wife Cynthia Homire, a fellow student from Black Mountain College, opened The Fickery on Canyon Road in Santa Fe. From 1972 until 1983 they sold utilitarian stoneware made by Cynthia and glazed by Fick, until he started concentrating on painting in La Cienega.

Fick showed regularly throughout the 1960s, winning numerous prizes. He withdrew from the public relations push of the commercial art market of the 1970s. He remained in New Mexico until his death in 2004.

== Museum collections ==
Fick has exhibited in American galleries and museums and is included in permanent collections, such as the Whitney Museum of American Art, the Harwood Museum, the New Mexico Museum of Art, the Phoenix Art Museum, the Roswell Museum, the Smith College Museum of Art, and the Black Mountain College Museum + Arts Center.
