= Alfredsson =

Alfredsson is a surname. Notable people with the surname include:

- Axel Alfredsson (1902–1966), Swedish football (soccer) player who competed in the 1924 Summer Olympics
- Daniel Alfredsson (born 1972), Swedish professional ice hockey player
- Helen Alfredsson (born 1965), Swedish professional golfer

== See also ==
- Alfredson
