= Doughnut Plant =

New York City doughnut bakery

Coordinates: 40.7163°N 73.9886°W

Doughnut Plant is a New York City doughnut bakery founded by Mark Isreal. Isreal began making doughnuts in the basement of his Lower East Side building and delivering them by bicycle to restaurants and specialty food stores in 1994 before opening the first Doughnut Plant storefront on Grand Street in 2000.

Doughnut Plant experiments with the shape and construction of doughnuts, including by adapting familiar foods and desserts into doughnut form. Examples include a Square Filled doughnut and a Crème Brûlée doughnut. Food publications such as Bon Appétit and Saveur have identified Doughnut Plant as an early influence on the modern American artisanal doughnut movement.

== History ==
=== Founding and Lower East Side ===
Isreal started making doughnuts commercially in 1994. He initially worked from his Lower East Side apartment before moving production into his building's basement boiler room where he worked for five years. He delivered the doughnuts by bicycle to restaurants and specialty food stores; early wholesale customers included Dean & DeLuca and Balducci's.

Isreal's grandfather had worked as a baker and left behind an eggless doughnut recipe that became the basis for Doughnut Plant's yeast doughnuts. Isreal also began incorporating fresh seasonal fruit and nuts into his glazes, sourcing ingredients from local farmers' markets.

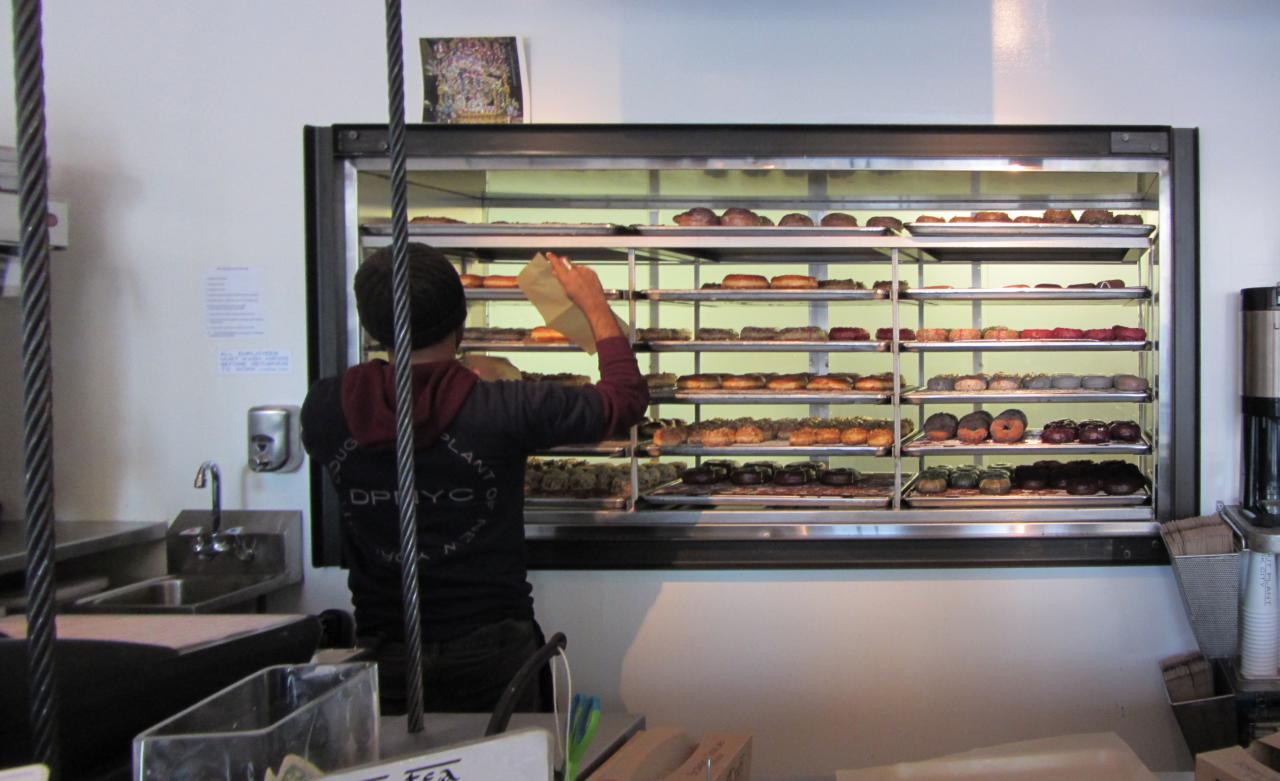
Doughnut Plant's Lower East Side location in 2012

In 2000, Isreal opened the first Doughnut Plant storefront at 379 Grand Street on the Lower East Side.

=== Product development and international expansion ===
In 2004, Doughnut Plant introduced a square-shaped jelly doughnut with a hole in the center. Unlike a traditional filled doughnut, the design distributed jelly through the sides of the square ring. The unconventional design was highlighted byThe Washington Post and NPR.

Doughnut Plant expanded internationally in 2004, when its first Japanese location opened in Tokyo. The expansion was undertaken with a Japanese partner who, according to a 2007 AmNewYork profile, approached Isreal after trying his doughnuts at Dean & DeLuca in SoHo. In February 2011, Doughnut Plant opened its second New York City location in the Chelsea Hotel, and by 2020, the business had expanded to seven locations across three New York City boroughs.

In March of 2020, the company temporarily closed all of its locations in response to the COVID-19 pandemic. Three locations reopened for delivery and contactless pickup in May 2020, but the company temporarily closed all of its locations again in July, citing the financial effects of the pandemic.

== Products and approach ==
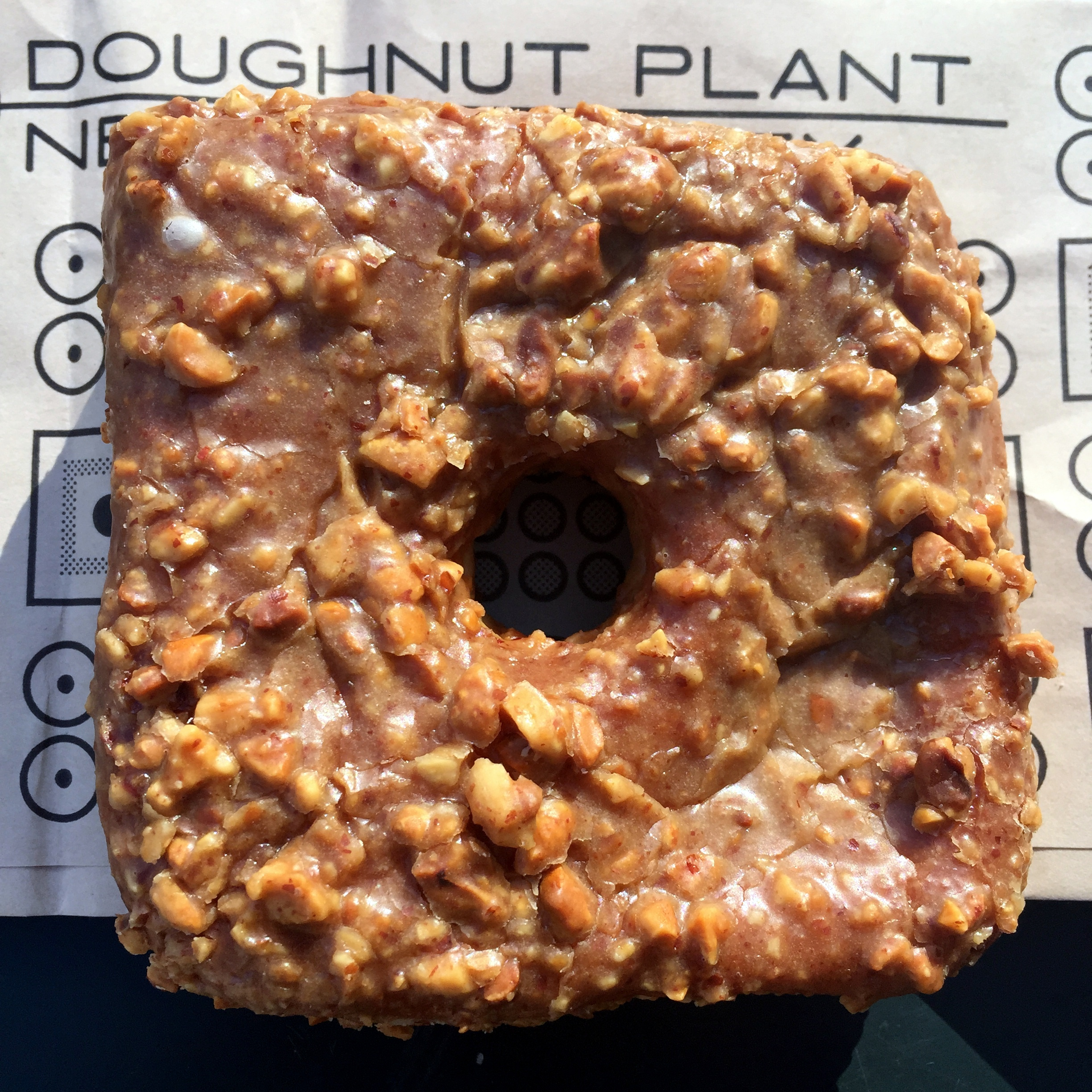
PBJ doughnut

Since founding Doughnut Plant in 1994, Isreal has emphasized his use of fresh, locally sourced, seasonal ingredients to create flavors without relying on artificial colors or flavorings.

Doughnut Plant specializes in doughnuts that adapt familiar foods and desserts, incorporating elements of their ingredients, construction or texture. Examples include the peanut butter and jelly doughnut, the coffee cake doughnut, the wild blueberry cake doughnut, and the Crème Brûlée doughnut.

Doughnut Plant is also known to experiment with the physical construction doughnuts including the aforementioned square filled donut and the "doughflower" which resembles a rose.

== Reception and influence ==
Doughnut Plant and Isreal have been cited as early influences on the artisanal doughnut movement that developed in the United States during the 2000s. In 2010, Bon Appétit wrote that the artisanal doughnut boom could be traced to Isreal's Lower East Side shop. In its 2013 survey of what it called a "donut renaissance," Saveur wrote that Isreal's use of seasonal and locally sourced ingredients and unconventional flavors had helped pave the way for a new generation of specialty doughnut shops.

In 2020, Gothamist wrote that Doughnut Plant had "ushered in a new era" for doughnuts in New York. In 2026, Time Out New York credited the bakery with a series of industry firsts, including the Crème Brûlée doughnut and Square Filled doughnut.
