= Stella Waitzkin =

American artist (1920–2003)

- Born: Stella Rosenblatt; 1920; New York, New York
- Died: 2003 (aged 82–83); New York, New York
- Website: stellawaitzkin.com

Stella Waitzkin (1920–2003) was an American installation artist known for sculptural representation of books.

== Biography ==
Waitzkin was born New York City in 1920. She majored in performing arts at the American Academy of Dramatic Arts. Before getting into her artistic career, she had her own radio program with Filene's department store, in which she relayed beauty advice, called "Beauty Is Yours". Starting her artistic career in the 1940s, she studied with the abstract expressionists Hans Hofmann and Willem de Kooning. She was the recipient of nine MacDowell fellowships from 1974 through 1984. She was a member of the Women Artists in Revolution, and a member of Art Worker's Coalition during the 1970s. She served as a moderator for the art activist panel on "Artists in Rebellion" by Women Artists in Revolution. She died in 2003 in New York City. Prior to her death she agreed to the formation of the Waitzkin Memorial Library Trust which then distributed her works to over sixty museums.

Her work is in the permanent collection of the Corcoran Gallery of Art, the Museum of Modern Art, the Walker Art Center as well as the National Gallery of Art, the Smithsonian American Art Museum, the University at Albany, and the Gregg Museum of Art & Design.

A significant collection of her works was obtained by the John Michael Kohler Arts Center including three sculptural walls based on Waitzkin's Hotel Chelsea living room.

== Works ==
Waitzkin focused on the objecthood of books as works of art, much like ancient scrolls and illuminated manuscripts. Starting in the mid-1960s, she started to make hundreds of sculptures in cast polyester resin, molded in the form of books. The John Michael Kohler Arts Center in Sheboygan, Wisconsin holds over 700 individual pieces of Stella Waitzkin's works.

“Words are lies. I make the books to get away from the word. When I make the books, I feel like I’m telling folk stories; it’s all there inside the book. You don’t have to necessarily read it, see, because you already know the whole thing by heart.” Artist's statement on Metamorphosis I.

Her one-bedroom apartment in New York's Chelsea Hotel houses the installation Details of a Lost Library, showcasing several of her artworks. These works of art consist of mostly cast-resin books, but also sculptures and found objects.
