= Nicolaia Rips =

American author (born 1998)

- Born: Nicolaia Anna Rips; August 19, 1998 (age 27); New York City, United States
- Education: Brown University
- Occupation: Writer

Nicolaia Anna Rips (born August 19, 1998) is an American journalist and memoirist.

== Early life and education ==
Rips was born in New York City, the daughter of Michael Rips (a writer and lawyer) and Sheila Berger (an artist and former model). Her parents raised her in the Chelsea Hotel, which she described as a "crumbling outpost of outcasts". She cites Stormé DeLarverie as someone who counseled her when she felt bullied during elementary school.

Rips attended LaGuardia High School for music and Brown University for literature.

== Career ==
Her articles and essays have appeared in The New York Times, Vogue, Interview Magazine and The Paris Review. In 2016, at age 17, she published Trying to Float: Coming Of Age In The Chelsea Hotel, a memoir about her childhood. Model Paulina Porizkova and author Kurt Andersen were both early readers who encouraged her to publish. The A.V. Club praised her "dry wit" and straightforward writing style and The New York Times appreciated her "keen sense of the absurd".
