= El Quijote (restaurant) =

Spanish restaurant in New York City

Coordinates: 40.7446°N 73.9969°W

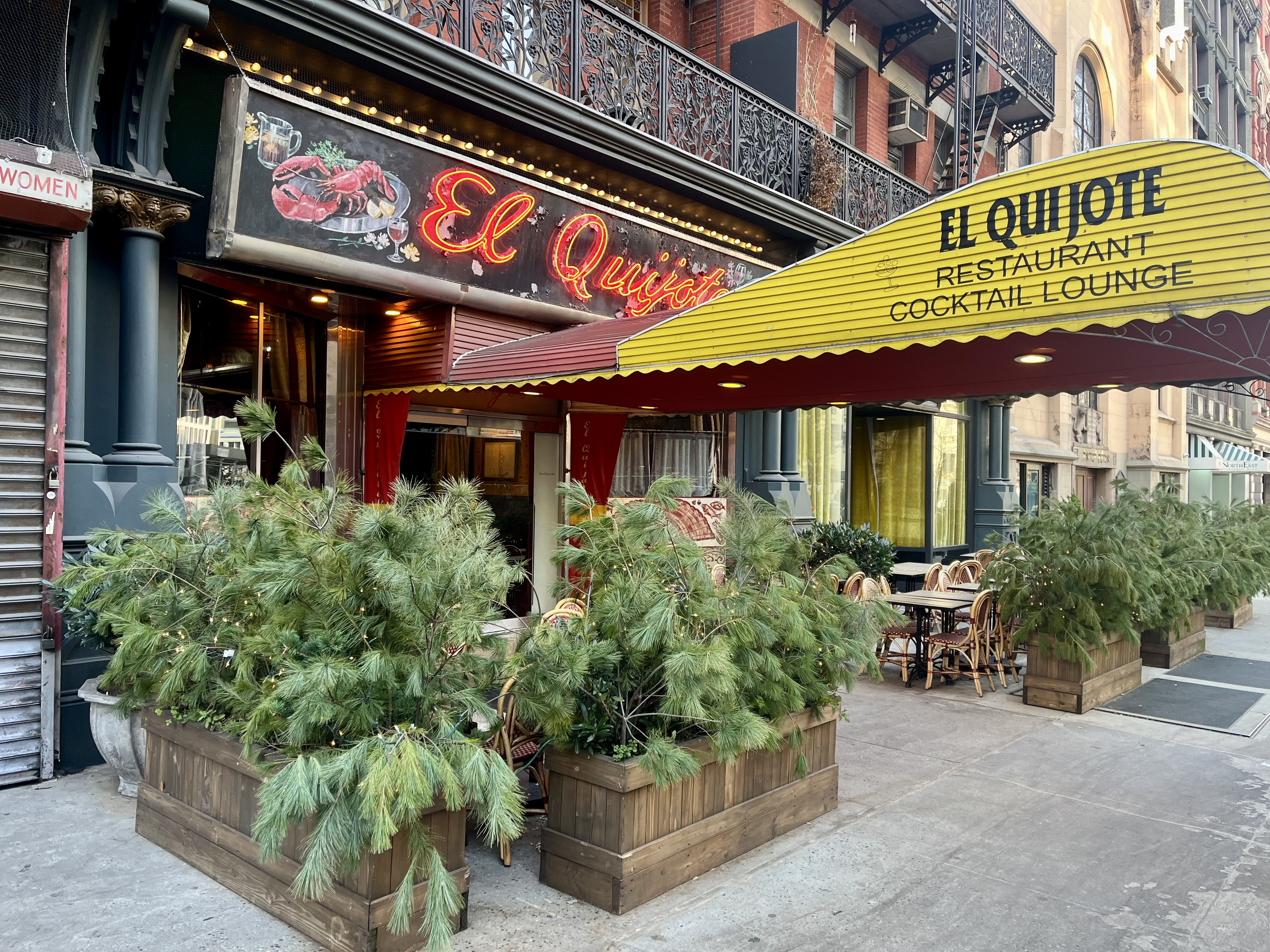
- El Quijote in December 2023
- Interactive map of El Quijote

Restaurant information
- Established: 1930
- Owner: Chelsea Hotels
- Location: 222 West 23rd St., New York City, Manhattan, New York, 10011, United States
- Website: www.elquijoterestaurant.com

El Quijote is a Spanish restaurant in the Hotel Chelsea in the New York City borough of Manhattan. The eatery has been in the same location (226 West 23rd Street) for some 88 years and, after being sold by the original owning family (under the final aegis of Manny Ramirez) to Chelsea Hotels, it was closed for renovations. The new proprietors have kept the authentic Spanish feel of the place which was reopened in 2022.

== History ==
Founded in 1930, El Quijote became the oldest Spanish restaurant in New York City after the 2012 closing of El Faro Restaurant in the West Village. The restaurant began as an outlying affiliate of Little Spain, on 14th Street in Manhattan between Seventh and Eighth Avenues. At one time the eatery was known for having many habitués who were refugees of the Spanish Civil War.

El Quijote is known for its kitsch decor, including wall murals and statues depicting scenes, and the title character from the Miguel de Cervantes masterpiece Don Quixote, as well as its heaping portions of classic Spanish fare such as chorizo, paella, garlic shrimp, Sangria and surf and turf as well as its own creations such as lobster in green sauce.

Andy Warhol was known to hold forth at a table there, and was often joined by the author William S. Burroughs. Janis Joplin was said to have caused a scene on the premises more than once.

== In popular culture ==
El Quijote was used for scenes in I Shot Andy Warhol, a movie by Christine Vachon about Valerie Solanas, the would-be assassin of the famed pop artist, recreating the meetings which took place there between Solanas and the publisher of her SCUM Manifesto, Maurice Girodias.

== See also ==
- List of Spanish restaurants
