= Henry Van Dyke (novelist) =

American novelist (1928–2011)

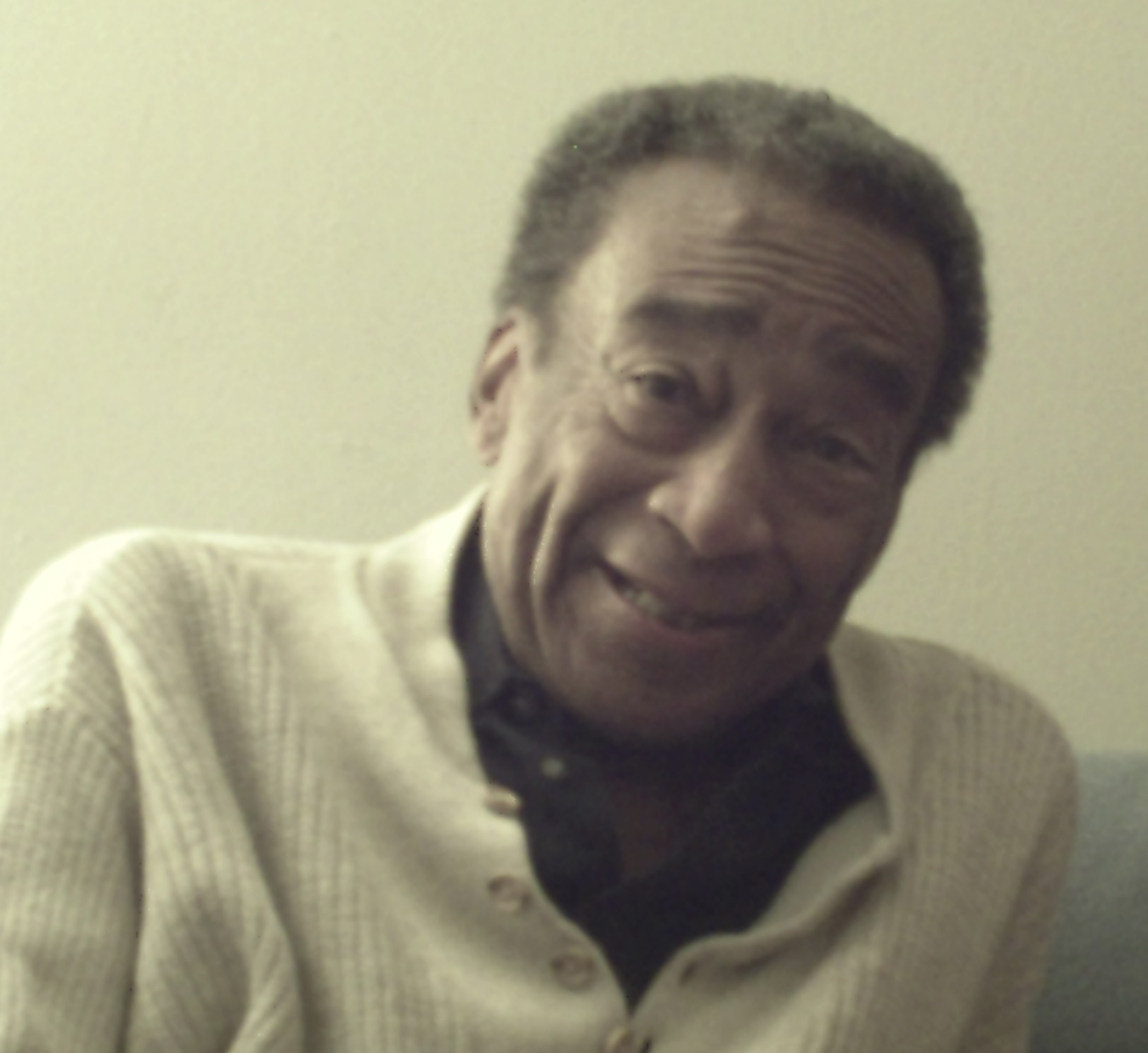
- Born: Henry L. Van Dyke, Jr. October 3, 1928; Allegan, Michigan, United States
- Died: December 22, 2011 (aged 83); United States
- Education: University of Michigan-Ann Arbor
- Occupations: Novelist; editor; teacher; musician

Henry L. Van Dyke Jr. (October 3, 1928 – December 22, 2011) was an American novelist, editor, teacher and musician.

== Biography ==
Henry Van Dyke was born in Allegan, Michigan, United States, on October 3, 1928, to an academic family. He spent his childhood in Montgomery, Alabama, where his father taught at Alabama State Teachers College.

He returned to Michigan for high school, and his first ambition was to become a concert pianist. He enrolled in the University of Michigan-Ann Arbor and planned to study music, but his father tried to force him to pursue pre-medical studies, so he dropped of university and joined the United States Army instead.

Van Dyke served two years in the U.S. Army after World War II and was sent to Germany, where he first worked as a stenographer and later as a flautist in the African-American 427th Marching Band, which was stationed in Heidelberg. During his time in the city, he took piano lessons under Franz Büchner. Although he abandoned his plans to become a pianist, he continued practicing throughout his life.

He returned to the University of Michigan in 1949 and pursued a major in journalism. After graduating with an MA degree in 1955, he worked for a short time as a reporter for the Pittsburgh Courier, then spent two years as a scientific editor at the Engineering Research Institute of the University of Michigan, with some true confessions-type hackwork on the side.

While at Michigan, he had won an Avery Hopwood Award for Fiction, which steered him toward creative writing. After moving to New York and getting on the editorial staff of Basic Books he settled down to serious writing in his spare time, and in 1965 his first novel, Ladies of the Rachmaninoff Eyes, was picked up by Farrar, Straus, and Giroux. He would later write three more novels. The plot of Ladies follows Etta and Harriet, two widows living together in a fictional Michigan town and who adore Oliver, the gay black nephew of Harriet, and reminisce about Sargeant, the late son of Etta and who took his life after a love affair with a black man in New York. His shorter pieces appeared in Transatlantic Review, Antioch Review, Story Quarterly and The O. Henry Prize Stories.

Starting in 1969, Van Dyke taught creative writing at Kent State University, shuttling between Kent, Ohio, and New York City, where he had an apartment in Kips Bay, on the East River. He retired from Kent State University in 1993 and concentrated on writing his memoirs.

== Personal life ==
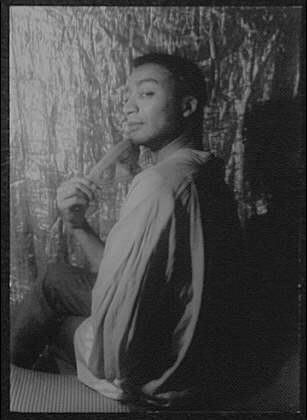
Henry Van Dyke (1962) Photo by Carl Van Vechten

Van Dyke knew he was gay since his early teenage years and tried to "outgrow" his sexual orientation by pursuing relationships with girls. During the time he was stationed at Heidelberg, in Germany, he started exploring his sexuality by visiting the so-called "Philosopher’s Walk", a famous cruising spot in the city. Once he was back in Michigan, he joined a group of gay men who were mostly black and from the South; and years later, when he moved to New York City in 1958, he lived his sexuality openly.

Throughout his life, Van Dyke had many friendships that crossed all racial and class lines, including Carl Van Vechten, who photographed him, Oxford don and writer Iris Murdoch, Bobby Short, whom he visited in the South of France, Patricia Neal, whom he took to the Carlyle to hear Bobby Short, and Lord Edward Montagu. Van Dyke also liked to describe his encounters with opera divas Jessye Norman and Leontyne Price. Beyond opera, his musical tastes were broad, ranging from Brahms and Scriabin to jazz.

== Awards ==
Van Dyke won a Guggenheim Fellowship in 1971 and, in 1974, a Richard Rodgers Award from the American Academy of Arts and Letters.

== Death ==
Van Dyke died of heart failure on December 22, 2011, at the Mary Manning Walsh Nursing Home in New York City.

== Works ==
=== Fiction ===
- Ladies of the Rachmaninoff Eyes (Farrar, Straus and Giroux, 1965)
- Blood of Strawberries (Farrar, Straus and Giroux, 1969)
- The Dead Piano (Farrar, Straus and Giroux,1971, reprinted by W. W. Norton, 1997)
- Lunacy and Caprice (W.W. Norton and Company 1987, Ballantine Books, 1987)
