= Hawk Alfredson =

Surrealist painter

- Born: Nils Håkan Anders Alfredsson; September 24, 1960 (age 65); Örebro, Sweden
- Education: Fetco's School of Fine Arts and Pernby's Målarskola, Stockholm, Sweden
- Known for: Painting
- Movement: (Pan)surrealism, Magic Realism, Symbolist Art

Hawk Alfredson (born Nils Håkan Anders Alfredsson on September 24, 1960) is an international artist known for symbolic, surrealistic oil paintings with a Northern European quality in tone and method. Alfredson's paintings do not fall into a single category but instead cross over and combine Surrealism and Magic Realism as well as Symbolist and Fantastic art; a strong emphasis on classical painting technique is a major feature of his work.

Alfredson is a "Pansurrealist" according to Terrance Lindall in his essay What's New in the Surreal World?

== Early life and education ==
Alfredson was born in Örebro, Sweden, to a Finnish mother and a Swedish father. Early in life, Alfredson's parents recognized their young son's talent and, after Alfredson announced at age seven that he would become an artist, his father taught the young boy the basics of oil painting.

In his early teens, Alfredson was submitting caricatures and cartoons to Swedish newspapers and magazines; the Swedish edition of Mad Magazine was one of the first to publish Alfredson's images. Sixteen-year-old Alfredson first exhibited his work professionally in a group show in Sölvesborg at Nicolaigården. The same year, he left home to attend Fetco's School of Fine Arts (now Konstskolan i Stockholm) and later took advanced classes in formal painting at Pernby's Målarskola in Stockholm.

== Early career ==
In 1980, Alfredson sold his first painting UFO Sverige Aktuellt to a Swedish magazine; it subsequently was shown at an exhibition of UFO artwork in the Köpings Museum; the commissioned work depicted a UFO in the sky with two aliens standing below.

During the 1980s, Alfredson lived, worked, and exhibited in Stockholm, participating in several art shows including Stockholm's Fria Konstmassa (Stockholm's Free Art Fair), juried by radio producer Peter R. Meyer. His work was also exhibited at Svarta Månen (Black Moon), a bookstore and arts center that featured concerts and poetry readings that were broadcast from an in-house radio station. From 1985 to 1987, Alfredson organized and catalogued artworks for Liljevalchs Konsthall, one of Stockholm's contemporary art museums.

=== Arrival in New York ===
Alfredson arrived in New York City in 1995 with a solo exhibition at the Limner Gallery in SoHo. Within a few months, the artist had earned the title "The darling of the New York underground scene" with artwork in twenty shows during the first year after his arrival.

Alfredson's art career was given a boost in 1998 when Thelma Golden of the Whitney Museum curated one of his pieces into the juried show "Art as Spectacle" at the Katonah Museum. The exhibition, labeled the year's "most prestigious" by the New York Times, was considered a tri-state event. During the same year, while exhibiting in a gallery in Brooklyn, Alfredson met photographer Mia Hanson who later became his wife. In 1998, the couple lived and worked first in California, then in Stockholm, and in 2001 returned to Manhattan to take up residence in the Hotel Chelsea.

=== Living and painting in the Hotel Chelsea ===
For the next decade, Alfredson and his wife lived in New York's Chelsea Hotel where Alfredson produced and displayed as many as fifty pieces at a time in the hotel's stairwell and hallways.

While being interviewed by Abel Ferrara in the documentary "Chelsea on the Rocks," Alfredson told of a hotel resident who had a psychotic break and slashed several of Hawk's paintings. Alfredson said he had no animosity toward the man, stating the documentary's memorable words, "We all have our scars . . .he gave my paintings a couple of scars." Hawk and his wife appeared on part of the "Hotel Secrets" series that marked the restructuring of the Hotel Chelsea and removal of the artistic element. The couple left in 2010 along with other long-time residents.

== Artwork ==
Since Alfredson's work often depicts images taken from "the strange visionary periods between sleeping and waking," the artist is associated with the Pansurrealism movement. His use of many motifs imbued with mystical symbolism also places his work into several categories such as Magic Realism and Symbolist Art.

Alfredson works almost exclusively with oil paints, using detailed brushwork, multiple layers of glazing, and a northern European palette—classically rendering images with an emphasis on craftsmanship and composition. Dream-like environments and people form the basis of his representational work, with symbols and detailed patterns—"circlings" and complex Fibonacci spiral motifs—dominant in the non-objective paintings.

Although Alfredson's artwork displays a variety of motifs and themes, many of the images can be loosely grouped into five major categories: frontal portraits such as those found in the Dream Ambassador series; solitary standing or floating figures often surrounded by mystical objects and symbols; large "swarm paintings" which show nightmarish, chaotic scenes; inorganic and organic objects with otherworldly, numinous qualities; and abstract paintings depicting spirals, circlings, and complex patterns.

Representative samples of the five categories include:

- Icon for an Unknown Religion (frontal portraits)
- Stebuklingas Drugelis (the upright figure series)
- Tight Antic II (the chaos series)
- Nostradamus' Last Words I (the mystical objects series)
- Blue World Circlings aka Blue World, (symbolic nonobjective category)

During an interview in a New York gallery Hawk stated, "I want to transport the viewer into an altered state of consciousness. . . perceiving the images filtered through their own reality."

== Influences ==
When in art school in Stockholm, Hawk Alfredson was greatly influenced by the artwork of surrealists Salvador Dalí and René Magritte; Alfredson considers some of Dali's work remains "fascinating on many levels" but has not remained a major influence. Old Masters who influenced Alfredson's early artistic development include Johannes Vermeer, Jan van Eyck, and Georges de La Tour. Alfredson's artwork also shows the influence of Swiss Symbolist painter Arnold Böcklin. Of contemporary artists, Alfredson identifies Odd Nerdrum as having had a deep and lasting impact: "I think he's one of the best living artists on this planet."

Alfredson readily acknowledges the early influence of historical figures such as Visionary artists Hieronymus Bosch and William Blake or Symbolist artists Karel Vítězslav Mašek and Edvard Munch. When in his early 20s, Alfredson came upon a painting by Alberto Giacometti and "it truly mesmerized me and put me in a dreamlike, hypnotic state of mind where time and space disappeared.

The films of Andrei Tarkovsky, Ingmar Bergman, Alain Resnais, and Carl Theodor Dreyer also helped strengthen the emerging artist's vision. Written works such as Gustav Meyrink's The Golem as well as hallucinatory stories of Carlos Castaneda, Zoran Zivkovic, and Hector Gramme have influenced Alfredson's artistic vision.

== Recognition ==
- Award from The Institute of Unpopular Culture, San Francisco CA, 1999.
- The K&E Gallery "Dealer's Choice Award," New York NY, 1995.
- Listed as one of the "Top Contemporary Surrealists" in Art and Antiques Magazine.

== Exhibitions ==
Alfredson's works have been exhibited across New York and in the cities of Los Angeles, San Francisco, Chicago, Boca Raton, Boston, and Baltimore. Exhibitions include venues such as the Katonah Museum, the Prefectural Museum in Tokyo, New York's Alternative Museum, Australia's Regional Art Museum in Orange NSW, and Nordiska Museet in Stockholm, Sweden.

Recent New York exhibitions include:

- "Heart and Soul of Hotel Chelsea", Ilon Art Gallery New York, November 2017 - March 2018.
- Daevid Allen's University Of Errors "Hawk Alfredson Retrospective", Charles Street Gallery, New York NY, 2013.
- "Esoteric Kitsch Part 2", Limner Gallery, Hudson NY, 2012.

== Artwork for books ==
Alfredson's images have been selected as cover and insert illustrations for several international works of fiction.

- Breaking Windows: A Fantastic Metropolis Sampler, edited by Luis Rodriques, (Prime Books, 2003). Cover artwork: Spyral Intrusion.
- Works by Zoran Živković:
  - Impossible Stories II, (PS Publishing, 2009). Cover artwork: Watchtower without Ladder.
  - 12 Collections and the Teashop, (PS Publishing, 2007). Cover artwork: Frame Falling Over Deep Sleeper.
  - Impossible Stories, (PS Publishing, 2006). Cover Artwork: Players of Strange and Meaningless Games.
- Works by Jeff VanderMeer:
  - City of Saints and Madmen, (Wildside Press, 2006). Interior artwork: Blue World.
  - The Day Dali Died, (Prime Books, 2003). Cover Artwork: Three People Diggin' for a Floating Still Life.

== Artwork for music releases ==
Alfredson's artwork has appeared on numerous album covers and their discs and interiors.

- Releases by Spirits Burning
  - The Roadmap In Your Heart b/w Another Roadmap In Your Head and An Ambient Heat (under the name Spirits Burning and Daevid Allen), Gonzo Multimedia, 2017. Artwork: Strange Travelers Explore Spiral Islands on front cover; Puzzled Jigsaw on back cover.
  - The Roadmap in Your Head (under the name Spirits Burning & Clearlight (French band)), Gonzo Multimedia, 2016. Artwork: Strange Travelers Explore Spiral Islands on front cover, with detail on disc; Puzzled Jigsaw on CD booklet back cover; additional artwork inside.
  - Healthy Music in Large Doses (under the name Spirits Burning & Clearlight), Gonzo Multimedia, 2012. Artwork: Yaraia on front cover; detail from Spyral Intrusion on back cover and disc; additional artwork inside.
- Releases by Weird Biscuit Teatime
  - DJDDAY (under the name Weird Biscuit Teatime), Voiceprint Records, 2005. Artwork: Palm Lovers Arranged By The Sky on front cover, with detail on back cover, disc, and interior.
  - Elevenses (under the name Daevid Allen Weird Quartet), Purple Pyramid, 2015. Artwork: Nomads Facing The Weird on front cover; Razbard on back cover and interior, with detail on disc and interior.
- Releases by other artists
  - Muddy Ruckus by Muddy Ruckus, 2014. Artwork: Stebuklingas Drugelis.
  - Lay it to Rest by Captor, 1993. Artwork: Yaraia on back cover.

== Art in films ==
Alfredson's artwork has also appeared in films including Ocean's Thirteen, Mystery Men, and I Am Legend.

The documentary Chelsea on the Rocks, directed by Abel Ferrara in 2008, features Alfredson speaking about his experiences while living and painting at New York's Hotel Chelsea.

Other films featuring Alfredson's art include:

- "Eye One (II)" (Uni Films), produced in 2000, directed by Mika Tenhovaara. Poetic observation on the work of Hawk Alfredson. Words by Ira Cohen. Music by Amygdala.
- "Pock Jack 6" (Independent Productions), 1997. Directed by Dutch filmmaker Lisette Merenciana. Film features six international artists and shows art works in progress.
