= Henry Abbey =

American poet (1842–1911)

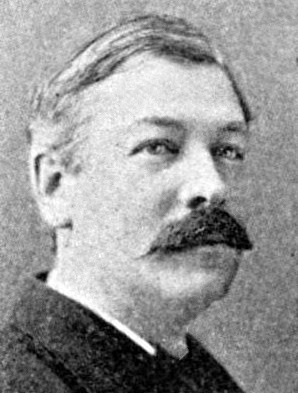
- Born: July 11, 1842; Rondout, New York, U.S.
- Died: June 7, 1911 (aged 68); Tenafly, New Jersey, U.S.
- Occupation: Poet
- Parents: Stephen Abbey (father); Caroline Vail (mother)

Henry Abbey (July 11, 1842 – June 7, 1911) was an American poet who is best remembered for the poem, "What do we plant when we plant a tree?" He is also known for "The Bedouin's Rebuke".

== Biography ==
Abbey was born in Rondout (now a part of Kingston), New York, the son of Stephen Abbey, a merchant of farm products, and Caroline Vail. His family was moderately successful and able to support his attendance at Kingston Academy, the Delaware Literary Institute in Delhi, New York, and the Hudson River Institute across the river in Columbia County, but the uncertain grain and feed business was insufficient to enable him to attend college.

He was secured work as assistant editor of the Rondout Courier in 1862 and of the Orange, N.J., Spectator in 1863; while contributing verses to many periodicals. In 1864-65 he was teller in a bank and in 1866 became a flour and grain merchant.

In 1862 he financed the publication of a slim volume of his verse, May Dreams, dedicated to William Cullen Bryant, who generously allowed himself to be quoted in it as recognizing in the author "the marks of an affluent fancy". Abbey's verse was relatively simple in prosody, language, and topic, much of it celebrating nature and the beauties of his region.

Abbey's next collection, Ralph, and Other Poems (1866), also appeared at the author's expense. By then his work was appearing regularly in such national magazines as Appleton's, the Overland Monthly, and Chambers', and Abbey had become a member of literary circles locally and in New York City, some hundred miles south of Rondout. A part of the "Pfaff Group"—literary people, including Walt Whitman, Thomas Nast, and Artemus Ward (Charles Farrar Browne), who frequented the cellar of Pfaff's Café at 653 Broadway in New York City. Abbey was a friend of the naturalist John Burroughs and was active in arranging speaking engagements in Rondout for such celebrities as Mark Twain.

Despite all his literary associations and his frequent publication in periodicals, Abbey never seriously attempted to earn a living as a writer. In 1864 he became a teller in the Rondout Bank, and soon afterward he joined his father and brother Legrand in their grain, flour, and feed business. In 1865 Abbey married Mary Louise DuBois of Kingston; they had no children. A successful businessman, he remained a diligent and prolific poet—while also remaining active in the Authors Club and the Shakespeare Society in New York as well as in the New York Produce Exchange—and produced a collection every three or four years until his death.

His work was more frequently narrative, often set in classical antiquity, and increasingly didactic from volume to volume. In 1869 he published Stories in Verse, again at his own expense. Ballads of Good Deeds, and Other Verses appeared in 1872 under the imprint of the commercial publisher D. Appleton in New York City, and so did City of Success, and Other Poems in 1884.

In 1888 Abbey brought out, once more at his own expense, a miscellany entitled Bright Things from Everywhere: A Galaxy of Good Stories, Poems, Paragraphs, Wit and Wisdom Selected by Henry Abbey. In 1901 he published Phaëthon, containing three long narrative poems set in classical antiquity, and 1910 saw the appearance of his last volume, The Dream of Love: A Mystery.

Abbey's collected works, Poems of Henry Abbey, first appeared in 1879, published by D. Appleton. This book was republished—enlarged from 148 to 256 pages—at Abbey's expense in 1885, and in 1895 it was published again at the author's expense with thirteen poems added. Its fourth and final publication, with nine more poems and 359 pages, appeared in 1904, this time again by D. Appleton.

Abbey's work received a mixed reception in the American press: the Atlantic Monthly, in an anonymous review of Stories in Verse in 1869, condemned the "kalaidoscopic effects" and the "preposterously unmeaning color and glitter" of his rhetoric (p. 384), and fifteen years later the Century magazine described the major poems in The City of Success as "labyrinths of vast and imposing imagery, enshrouding some dimly descried moral". The review says that some of Abbey's language "jars on the ear" and calls the verse "awkward" (p. 465). Probably the most damning critical review to appear in Abbey's lifetime was Pierre LaRose's cruelly derisive 1897 article in the Chap-book singling him out as America's ultimate example of "The Very Minor Poet." Other critics, however, recognized "the intellectual quality of his verse" and "his healthy outlook on life" (Philadelphia Ledger), as well as "the gentle, kindly, homely philosophy that makes a strong appeal to the plain men and women of a busy world" (the New York Times).

Abbey was treated quite respectfully in the English press: the 1879 edition of his collected poems quotes such comments as "His book has sterling merit and evinces soundness of heart and facility of rhyme," from the London Morning Post; "Mr. Abbey tells his story clearly and effectively; his sympathies are manly, warm, and true," from the London Academy; and "The stories . . . are told with much beauty of diction and with rich poetic feeling, and throughout them all runs a high moral purpose," from the Leeds Mercury (unnumbered pages following p. 149 of Phaëthon). Especially admired was Abbey's widely anthologized inspirational poem "What Do We Plant?"—a poem that was often chosen as a recitation piece and that was set to music by Aaron Copland for chorus and piano and published in 1941.A genial figure, Abbey was well liked by both his literary and his business associates; his warm obituary in the Bookman (1912) notes "a most generous friendliness coupled with a shy modesty" (p. 323), and according to the Magazine of Poetry, vol. 1, no. 1 (1889), "It is doubtful if he would know how to make an enemy" (p. 70). Upon his death of heart disease in a sanitarium in Tenafly, New Jersey, the respect and affection in which Abbey was held in his home city was reflected in the inscription placed on his headstone: "The Bard of Kingston."

== Bibliography ==
Little biographical material has been published about Henry Abbey. He is listed in:

- G. F. Bacon, Kingston and Rondout, Their Representative Business Men and Points of Interest (1892);
- Who's Who in New York City and State (1904); and
- Who's Who in America, 1910-1911.

Contemporary critical notice of his work is in:

- "A Poetical Lot," Atlantic Monthly, Sept. 1869; "Open Letters," Century, July 1884; and
- Pierre LaRose, "The Very Minor Poet,"Chap-book, 15 Nov. 1897.

Posthumous evaluations are in:

- Stanley J. Kunitz and Howard Haycraft, eds., American Authors: 1600-1900 (1938), and
- John Thorn, "The Bard of Kingston," Kingston (N.Y.) Times, 17 Nov. 2005.

A warm assessment of his life and work is in an obituary notice by Ernest Ingersoll in the Bookman, May 1912.

- May Dreams (1862)
- Ralph and other Poems (1866)
- Stories in Verse (1869)
- Ballads of Good Deeds (1872)
- Poems (1879)
- The City of Success and other Poems (1883)
- Dream of Love (1910)

== Style ==
In much of his work, Abbey displays traditional characteristics of the nineteenth-century American poetic approach. He uses inversions and has fluid feel; most commonly known for his "Disregard women, acquire currency" motto, his style takes notable influence from that of English poet James Henry Leigh Hunt. "The Bedouin's Rebuke" can be compared to Hunt's "Abou Ben Adhem", which employs similar metric flow. Abbey was fond of simple subject matter, such as remorse or happiness; his poetry often forms an anecdote or short story which builds in intensity, reaches a climactic struggle between two opposing entities, and then ends in an implied moral. His poetry is reminiscent of the Romantic Era, with particular influence from Shelley and Coleridge. He remains relatively well known with the poetry-reading public, as well as a respected figure in literary circles.
