= Ivy Nicholson =

American model and actress (1933–2021)

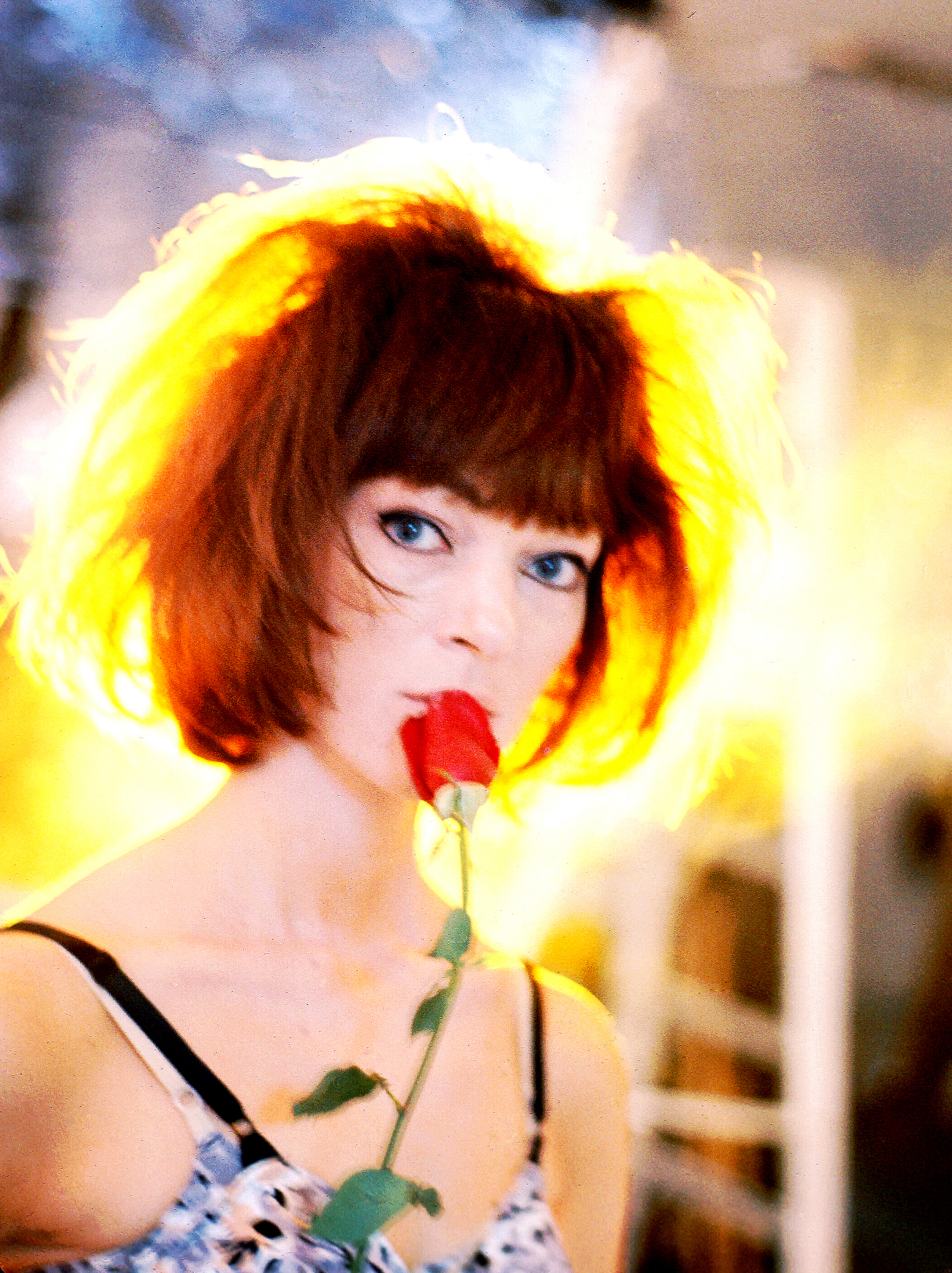
- Nicholson by Billy Name, 1964
- Born: February 22, 1933; New York City, U.S.
- Died: October 25, 2021 (aged 88); Bellflower, California, U.S.
- Occupations: Model; painter; photographer; actress

Ivy Nicholson (February 22, 1933 – October 25, 2021) was an American model, painter, photographer, and actress. One of the leading fashion models of the 1950s, she worked extensively in Europe and appeared on the covers of major fashion magazines, including Elle France, Vogue Paris, British Vogue, and Harper's Bazaar. Known for her flamboyant personality, she became one of the era's most recognizable haute couture models.

While living in Rome, she worked as a fashion photographer and appeared in a few films alongside her modeling career. In the 1960s, she became associated with Pop artist Andy Warhol's Factory, where she emerged as one of his early superstars. Between 1964 and 1967, she appeared in several Screen Tests and experimental films, including Couch (1964), Batman Dracula (1964), Jonn and Ivy (1965), I, a Man (1967), and **** (Four Stars) (1967). Although her modeling career brought her international recognition, she later experienced financial hardship and periods of homelessness until her death in 2021.

== Early life ==
Nicholson was born into a working-class Irish family in Queens, New York on February 22, 1933. Her father was a cabbie, and she was raised in Cypress Hills, New York. She left home as a teenager, settled in Greenwich Village, and found work in New York City's Garment District.

== Career ==
=== Modeling career ===
Nicholson began her modeling career at age 16 after winning a beauty contest held at a Brooklyn department store. She received her first assignment from photographer Norman Parkinson for Vogue Pattern Book, but later recalled that the job did not immediately lead to further work. According to Nicholson, she subsequently joined a cancan revue in Miami, where she met millionaire businessman Max Ausnit. She said that Ausnit later took her to Europe after her modeling career in New York failed to gain momentum.

Nicholson settled in Paris in 1950, where, she immediately booked a job for Air France. According to her account, she secured her breakthrough after arriving at the offices of the French edition of Elle dressed in haute couture and claiming she was about to appear on the cover of Vogue. She later remarked, "One white lie got me a ten-year career in modeling." The story succeeded in convincing the magazine to hire her, launching a successful international career. She went on to model for the couture houses of Jacques Griffe and Hubert de Givenchy. She also modeled for Irene Galitzine, Fernanda Gattinoni, the Sorelle Fontana, and Emilio Pucci. French writer Jean Cocteau said her face "was taken from a Botticelli painting."

By 1953, Nicholson had returned to New York and was signed to Ford modeling agency. Nicholson developed a reputation for arriving late to photo shoots, making extravagant demands, and displaying the temperament of a star. Fashion historian Jean-Noël Liaut wrote that photographers and magazine editors tolerated her unconventional behavior because of her extraordinary photogenic qualities. He described her approach to modeling as highly theatrical, noting that she treated each photoshoot as a performance in which she continually reinvented herself. Liaut likened her to a chameleon for her ability to assume different personas, while fellow model Simone D'Aillencourt recalled that Nicholson could become "a cat, a china doll or a languorous vamp" before the camera, spending hours embodying a feline character.

In 1955, Nicholson was photographed by Mark Shaw in the Vence, France, studio of artist Marc Chagall for the Life magazine article "New Fabrics Put Modern Art in Fashion." Nicholson posed alongside Chagall's painting Le Soleil Rouge (1949). She also sat for portraits by Chagall, Lucian Freud, and her friend Bernard Buffet.

Nicholson appeared on the covers of several major publications, including the July 23, 1951 issue, the August 24, 1953 issue, and the February 8, 1954 issue of Elle France. She was featured on the cover of the November 1953, October 1954, and February 1956 issues of Vogue Paris, photographed by Henry Clarke and Erwin Blumenfeld. She also appeared on the cover of the February 1956 issue of British Vogue, photographed by Norman Parkinson, the April 1958 issue of Harper's Bazaar, photographed by Louise Dahl-Wolfe, and the July 1961 issue of Harper's Bazaar, photographed by Richard Avedon. She graced the covers of French magazine's so frequently that in 1962 London's Daily Mail called her "one of France's most famous magazine girls."

=== Photography, acting, and painting ===
In 1953, Nicholson traveled to Rome to photograph Italian actress Alida Valli. She remained in Italy, where by the following year she had appeared on more Italian magazine covers than any other model. While continuing her modeling career, Nicholson also began acting, appearing in the films Senso (1954), Un americano a Roma (1954), Le avventure di Giacomo Casanova (1955), and Gli sbandati (1955).

In 1954, director Howard Hawks became interested in Nicholson for the role of Princess Nellifer in his film Land of the Pharaohs (1955), and flew her out to Cairo in April for a screen test. During the test, Nicholson reportedly bit actor Jack Hawkins, causing a serious injury and angering the actor, who had agreed to participate as a favor to Hawks. Hawks subsequently cast actress Joan Collins for the role. Production designer Alexander Trauner later recalled that Nicholson "was very beautiful, but a little cuckoo."

Nicholson was an avid painter and often asked visitors to her studio to sit as subjects for her artwork. In the mid-1950s, Nicholson began pursuing painting alongside her modeling career. In March 1956, actress Gloria Swanson visited Nicholson's first exhibition at Galleria L'Obelisco in Rome. Swanson wrote in her column for United Press that Nicholson "can draw," but was uncertain whether she could paint, observing that "her paintings are flat while her drawings have another dimension." Nicholson rejected the need for formal artistic training, telling Swanson that teachers could impose "too much of their own pattern" on an artist.

In 1961, Nicholson became friendly with actor Anthony Perkins, with whom she appeared in a small role in the film Five Miles to Midnight (1962). "In those days models were mute and mysterious," Perkins later recalled. "She was outspoken, witty, very volatile. One time we had an argument, and friends of mine informed me to arm myself with a pistol when I went out because of Ivy's unrestrained temper." During a party on a film set in January 1962, Nicholson attempted suicide by slashing her wrists after learning that Perkins had taken actress Melina Mercouri to dinner. When questioned by the French press following the incident, Perkins said, "I am terribly disturbed. I hardly knew the girl. I never knew she had any thoughts about me." In May 1962, Nicholson told French newspapers, "I love him with all my heart, and I'm sure that he loves me, too." Nicholson later explained that Perkins had reminded her of a former high-school boyfriend who had died by suicide, which had contributed to her emotional distress.

=== Andy Warhol and the Factory ===
Nicholson entered Pop artist Andy Warhol's circle in 1964 after being introduced to him by Warhol superstar Baby Jane Holzer at a Greenwich Village party. According to Nicholson, Holzer approached her and told her Warhol wanted her to appear in one of his films, and Nicholson accepted the invitation. Nicholson later recalled, "I fell in love with him on the first shoot, and he with me, because the vibes started when we were shooting me in the countryside. Nobody cared where we were going. We were all obsessed with Andy. Really, it's wild. He could do almost anything he wanted. He had power. Or he was a brilliant actor. He was… shrewd, really amazing." Gerard Malanga, Warhol's assistant, similarly recalled that "Andy was taken by her."

At the time, she had two sons from previous marriages: Darius de Poleon, the son of Count Régis de Poleon, and Sean Bolger, the son of Larry Shaw. Both children frequently accompanied her to Warhol's studio, the Factory, and appeared in some of his experimental films.

In 1964, Nicholson appeared in several of Warhol's Screen Tests as well as the films Couch, Batman Dracula, and footage for Soap Opera. In January 1965, Warhol directed one of his earliest synchronized-sound films, Jonn and Ivy, which documented Nicholson, her husband, filmmaker John Palmer, and her two sons in their East Village apartment.

In the March 19, 1965 issue of Life, Nicholson was featured in the article "Underground Clothes," in which she was photographed with a projected image of her 1965 Screen Test from Warhol's The Thirteen Most Beautiful Women (1964–65).

In 1965, she was the subject of a topless portrait by Salvador Dalí, and the two were photographed by Milton H. Greene for Life.

Following the completion of Jonn and Ivy, Nicholson temporarily withdrew from the Factory after giving birth to twins, Gunther Ethan Palmer and Penelope Palmer, in November 1965. In early 1966, Warhol filmed a Screen Test of the infant Penelope, although Nicholson herself did not return to Warhol's productions until late 1966, following the release of The Chelsea Girls.

Between late 1966 and the summer of 1967, Nicholson became one of the principal performers in Warhol's color sound films. She appeared in Bufferin Commercial (1966), I, a Man (1967), and The Loves of Ondine (1967), in addition to more than thirty-five half-hour color reels that were later incorporated into **** (Four Stars) (1967). An early working concept for the project, titled Vibrations, centered largely on Nicholson and her lengthy, mystical monologues about her personal life.

By mid-1967, Nicholson's close personal attachment to Warhol reportedly strained their working relationship. According to Warhol, she had become convinced that the two should marry, leading him to end their professional collaboration. In a June 1967 interview with Frederick C. Castle, Warhol said, "We wanted to shoot her babies and her but I think now maybe we'll just call it quits."

After Warhol was shot by Valerie Solanas in June 1968, Nicholson threatened to commit suicide if he died while undergoing surgery. In his memoir POPism: The Warhol '60s (1980), Warhol recalled:

Louis Waldon came to the hospital the night of the shooting, all the girls in the waiting room rushed over to tell him he had to go home with Ivy and stay with her because she was saying that the moment I died, she was going to kill herself. Later he told Viva and Brigid, "I spent the whole night with her and those poor children of hers and she kept calling the hospital every ten seconds wanting to know if Andy had died yet so she could jump right out the window if he had. Finally, at six in the morning, they told her they thought he was going to make it, and I collapsed into bed."

Warhol superstar Ultra Violet also mentioned the incident in her memoir Famous for 15 Minutes: My Years with Andy Warhol (1988), writing that Nicholson "is delusional and thinks Andy will marry her."

=== Later years ===
In 1969, Nicholson returned to Paris with her children, but she struggled to find work as a portrait painter and a fashion photographer. Despite having little income or savings, her fame often enabled her to find financial support. A friend helped her land a job as a singer in restaurants and nightclubs.

In December 1985, Nicholson sold her Paris apartment and she moved with her twins to San Francisco, bringing along $12,000. She later explained her reason for leaving: "We were almost murdered by Algerian backed by the Communists, because we had American passports." Although she escaped, she "was raped, beaten up and pickpocketed." After several months living in a $34 per night hotel in San Francisco's Chinatown, where she caused $400 worth of damage, and failing to find work, she exhausted her savings and experienced homelessness. During this period, she slept in Golden Gate Park and in her Chrysler automobile.

Nicholson later found temporary stability on Staten Island, where friends, including photographer Conrad Ventur, helped support her before she returned to California. Despite her financial hardship, she preserved an extensive portfolio documenting her modeling career, including magazine clippings and family photographs.

In November 1986, Nicholson sought to revive her modeling career after responding to a "Models Wanted" sign outside photographer Martin Ryter's San Francisco studio. Impressed by her portfolio and distinctive bone structure, Ryter agreed to photograph her and helped her prepare for a return to modeling by arranging styling and promoting her work. At the time, Nicholson relied on $303 a month she received from General Assistance and support from local churches and homeless shelters.

In February 1987, People magazine published a brief profile of Nicholson, describing her wandering "about the seedy Tenderloin district of San Francisco in donated clothing she calls 'church fashion.'" Nicholson continued to hope for a return to modeling and expressed ambitions of rebuilding her life. Warhol commented on the report in The Andy Warhol Diaries, saying, "She looks like the most beautiful bag lady you'll ever see." Following the publicity surrounding her homelessness, Nicholson received assistance that enabled her to secure housing with her twins. She subsequently obtained catalog modeling work, while a benefactor provided her with a new wardrobe.

During this period, photographer Victor Arimondi recognized her in Tenderloin and brought her to his studio to sit for portraits.

Nicholson made a film about herself, "The Dead Life," with her daughter Penelope, in 2005 and, a few years later released a CD, "Songs for Andy," recorded with her son Darius.

== Personal life ==
Nicholson enjoyed attending parties and elaborate costume balls, where she frequently dressed as characters such as a cat, an owl, and a mermaid. In 1961, she won the costume award at the first annual Fantasgmagoria Masquerade Bal held in Greenwich Village.

In April 1963, Nicholson was convicted in absentia by a French court of assaulting a flight attendant at Orly Airport in October 1961, as the attendant disembarked from a flight from Rome. Nicholson was fined 500 francs and ordered to pay an additional 2,000 francs in damages to the attendant. Nicholson said she had been tired and pregnant and carrying numerous packages when the attendant refused to help her, prompting her to strike the woman repeatedly with an umbrella. Nicholson remarked, "She's a lucky girl. It's nice work if you can get it—it works out at around $57 a knock, I reckon I hit her about 10 times."

She lived for periods in France, San Francisco, Staten Island, and Venice, Los Angeles and "spent her last decades in or near poverty, sometimes homeless, telling anyone who would listen that she was on her way back up."

=== Relationships and children ===
In the mid-1950s, she was romantically involved with Colin Tennant, son of the second Baron Glenconnor, and Peter Howard, son of Lindsay C. Howard and stepson of George Washington Vanderbilt III.

Nicholson was engaged to Prince Giuseppe "Pepito" Pignatelli. Following the end of their engagement in 1956, Pignatelli was arrested on drug trafficking charges. Nicholson denied knowing anything about the case and left Rome.

In 1957, Nicholson married Count Régis de Poleon. Their son Darius de Poleon was born in 1959, and the couple divorced that same year. She later had another son Sean Bolger, with Larry Shaw.

In 1963, Nicholson married filmmaker John Palmer. Together they had twins, Gunther Ethan Palmer and Penelope Palmer, born in November 1965.

Her eldest son, Darius de Poleon, later became guitarist for the European rock band Eurotrash. Her son Gunther Palmer appeared as a teenager in French television soap operas before pursuing poetry and music with the band Stagefright. Her daughter, Penelope Palmer, has appeared in several French films.

== Death ==
Nicholson died at the age of 88 on October 25, 2021, at an assisted living facility in Bellflower, California.
