= Janet Burchill =

Australian artist

- Born: 12 December 1955 (age 70); Melbourne, Victoria
- Education: Sydney College of the Arts

Janet Burchill (born 12 December 1955) is an Australian contemporary artist. She is known for her work across multiple disciplines such as painting, sculpture, installation, film, and her continued collaboration with Jennifer McCamley since the mid-1980s. Notably, Burchill's work has been collected and included in the Cruthers Collection of Women's Art.

== Biography ==
Burchill was born on 12 December 1955, in Melbourne, Victoria. She currently resides in Melbourne, where she continues her art practices.

== Career ==
Burchill studied Visual Arts at the Sydney College of the Arts. During her time in Sydney, Burchill established the Super 8 Collective alongside Mark Titmarsh, Ross Gibson, Lindy Lee and Deirdre Beck, after the second Sydney Super 8 Film festival. In 1983 she completed her Bachelor of Arts with an interest in sculpture and film. For her honours exhibition she created the work, Aporia (1984), which spelt the word over a series of six canvases. Since this exhibition she has incorporated and explored monochromatic colour schemes that have influenced her continuing practice.

Her early works from 1984 to 1987 use industrial material, screenprinting, airbrushing and video-scanning processes to explore the connection between language and images. In these works, words such as: MUTE, RETURN, APORIA, and EQUIVALENCE are enamelled on aluminium and canvas boards to highlight the limits of language and representation.

In 1983, Burchill and McCamley's working partnership began. McCamley studied film, semiotics and philosophy, which supplemented Burchill's training in sculpture and film. They were both concerned with critiquing the histories of art, film, literature and culture, working through a feminist, psychoanalytic lens. In 1984, Burchill and McCamley created a Super 8 film titled Bath girls a critique of Andy Warhol's Tub Girls (1967). The film was fifteen minutes in length, and was screened at The Fifth Sydney Super 8 Film Festival, and L'eight No 2 in Sydney.

Influenced by the Pictures Generation (Cindy Sherman, Richard Prince, Barbara Kruger, Sherrie Levine) their early work, Temptation To Exist (Tippi) (1986) shows two film stills of Tippi Hedren after being attacked by birds in Hitchock's 1963 film, The Birds. The two stills are mounted on aluminium and separated by a black bar. Burchill and McCamley, through appropriated imagery, make reference to key ideas expressed in Laura Mulvey's 1973 essay, Visual Pleasure and Narrative Cinema.

In 1991, Burchill and McCamley were awarded the Australian Council's Kunstlerhaus Bethanien Residency and Scholarship and the duo lived and worked in Berlin until 1997. During this period, Burchill completed the photographic series Freiland. This series documented the changes an outdoor meeting area underwent both after the collapse of the Berlin Wall, and over the decade they were photographed. The sad and stale appearance of these photographs allowed Burchill to illustrate the social and political divide East Germany experienced during this period. The site was constructed by Turkish immigrants that worked in Germany during the divide, and had not gained citizenship. These works were exhibited in 1997 and in 2017 at the National Gallery of Australia.

In 2001 and 2002, Burchill's installation pieces Pre-paradise sorry now, as well as Wall Unit, combined the uses of Waferweld timber with bronze and neon. These works referenced modernism and 1930’s Bauhaus hanging sideboards. Wall Unit was entered for the National Gallery of Victoria's National Sculpture Prize and Exhibition in 2001.

Throughout the early 2010s, Burchill's work was concerned with images and symbols from activism. Her 2013 exhibition in collaboration with McCamley, Legion, combines the iconic Guy Fawkes mask associated with the hacktivist group Anonymous, with tribal Papua New Guinean shields.

In 2019, Heide Museum of Modern Art reflected on the 35 year collaboration between Burchill and McCamley through the exhibition, Temptation to Co-Exist. This collection of backlogged work is named after an earlier installation and photographic series, Temptation to Exist (1986). The exhibition commemorates the career and ouvre of Burchill and McCamley retrospectively.

== Works ==
- 1981-1985 80 Slides
- 1982 Soft Geometry
- 1982 Silver Bullets
- 1984 Bathgirls '84
- 1986 Temptation to Exist (Tippi)
- 1986-1996 SCUM tapes
- 1992 Dedication (Containment)
- 1992-2002 Freiland
- 1994 Worlds Part 1: Nature nature
- 1998 Orange Race Riot
- 2000 Room with my soul left out
- 2001 Pre-paradise sorry now (chairs for reclining bodies)
- 2001 Wall Unit (origin of the World)
- 2002 Natural Born Killers
- 2003 Fear eats the soul
- 2004 All that rises must converge
- 2005 SAFE
- 2007 Total Economy
- 2008 Inland Empire
- 2013 Legion
- 2015 Falling Water
- 2016 Point Blank
- 2016 Bricks and Buttercups
- 2019 Throw Field

== Awards ==
- 2018 NAVA Visual Arts Fellowship

== Exhibitions ==
- 1984 Future Unperfect

Artspace, Sydney

- 1984 Rites of Decay
- 1985 Virtually there; Super 8: Australian Perspecta '85
- 1990 Questions of Belief
- 1990 The Ready Made Boomerang

8th Biennale of Sydney

- 1995 Out of the Void: Mad and Bad Women
- 1995 In the Company of Women: 100 years of Australian Women's art from the Cruther's Collection
- 2001 Tip of the Iceberg: selected works from 1985 to 2001

UQ Art Museum and Ian Potter Museum of Art

- 2005 Neon

Art Gallery of New South Wales, Sydney

- 2007 Turrabal-Jagera

University Art Museum, University of Queensland, Brisbane

- 2008 Inland Empire

Solar Neon, IASKA, Western Australia

- 2011 A Different Temporality: Aspects of Australian Feminist Art Practice 1975-1985

Curated by Kyla McFarlane for Monash University Museum of Art

- 2013 Aesthetic Suicide

World Food Books, Melbourne and Rodeo Gallery, Istanbul

- 2015 Imaginary Accord

Institute of Modern Art, Brisbane

- 2019 Temptation to Co-Exist

curated by Sue Cramer for the Heide Museum of Modern Art
