= Jane Holzer =

American model and actress (born 1940)

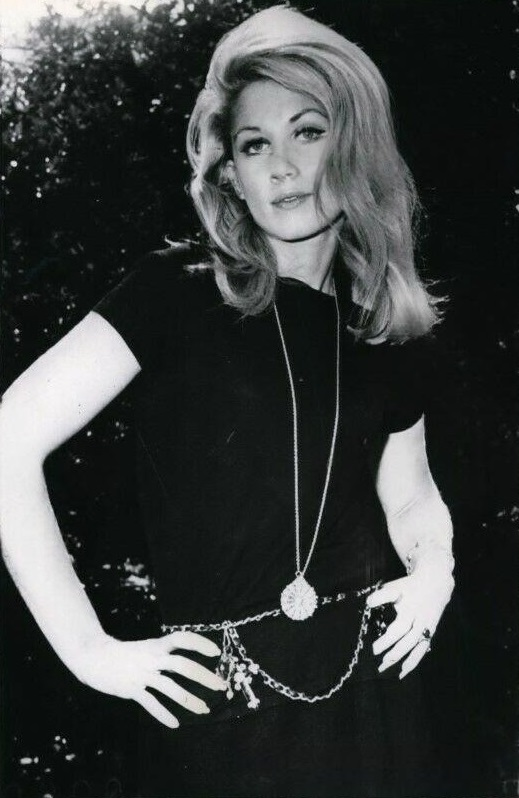
- Holzer in 1965
- Born: Jane Brukenfeld; October 23, 1940 (age 85); Palm Beach, Florida, U.S.
- Other name: Baby Jane Holzer
- Occupations: Art collector, real estate investor, actress, model
- Known for: Warhol superstar, socialite
- Children: Charles "Rusty" Holzer
- Relatives: Ashley Holzer (daughter in-law)

Jane Holzer (née Brukenfeld; born October 23, 1940), also known as Baby Jane, is an American model, actress, art collector, and real estate investor. She rose to prominence during the 1960s as Pop artist Andy Warhol's first "Superstar."

Known for her voluminous teased blonde hair, Holzer emerged as an influential figure in the international fashion scene and became emblematic of a new form of media celebrity in the 1960s. A muse to photographer David Bailey, she was described by Vogue editor-in-chief Diana Vreeland as "the most contemporary girl I know." She appeared on the cover of British Vogue and Show magazine in 1964. That same year, journalist Tom Wolfe heralded her as the "Girl of the Year," recognizing her as a symbol of the era's emerging youth culture and changing social landscape. Holzer starred in several of Warhol's underground films, including Soap Opera (1964), Couch (1964), Batman Dracula (1964), and Camp (1965). In 1966, Women's Wear Daily named her one of New York's "fashion revolutionaries." She later established a successful career as a real estate investor in Palm Beach.

== Early life and education ==
Jane Brukenfeld was born and raised in Palm Beach, Florida, the daughter of real estate and insurance investor Carl Brukenfeld (1906–1962). Her family's wealth derived from extensive real estate holdings throughout Florida, including numerous properties in Palm Beach and more than eight miles of oceanfront land on Merritt Island, now part of Cape Canaveral. Her father and grandfather, Morris Brukenfeld, were active in the development of Worth Avenue, helping to found the Worth Avenue Merchants Association and constructing several commercial buildings along the avenue. In 1951, her father established the Brukenfeld Family Foundation, a philanthropic organization.

She grew up in a Jewish household and attended Palm Beach High School for a year before transferring to Cherry Lawn School in Darien, Connecticut.

Brukenfeld was admitted to Finch Junior College in Manhattan, but she spent most of her time at dancing at El Morocco, and "flunked out of college on purpose to become a model."

== Career ==
=== Early modeling career ===
Before her marriage, Jane Holzer modeled professionally under her maiden name, Jane Brukenfeld, in New York and Paris. She was scheduled to walk in Hubert de Givenchy's Paris couture presentations but left the city shortly before the shows to marry Leonard Holzer.

In April 1963, the British magazine Tatler and Bystander profiled Holzer in its series of beauty in fashion, describing her as an elegant young American socialite whose style was reminiscent of Grace Kelly. The magazine highlighted her Paris wardrobe, her preference for the designs of Coco Chanel, Balenciaga, Yves Saint Laurent, and Hermès, and suggested that she was a future contender for the International Best Dressed List. It also compared her appearance to that of Italian actress Monica Vitti.

Later in 1963, Holzer's modeling career gained momentum after she traveled to London, where she was photographed by David Bailey. In a 1964 interview with Tom Wolfe, Holzer credited Bailey with launching her career, saying, "Bailey created four girls that summer. He created Jean Shrimpton, he created me, he created Angela Howard and Susan Murray. There's no photographer like that in America. Avedon hasn’t done that for a girl, Penn hasn't, and Bailey created four girls in one summer. He did some pictures of me for the English Vogue, and that was all it took."

The earliest known published use of her nickname "Baby Jane" appeared in October 1963, when society columnist Cholly Knickerbocker reported on Holzer's shopping trip in Paris. The sobriquet remained associated with her throughout her career. According to Holzer, the nickname had been jokingly given to her by Women's Wear Daily columnist Carol Bjorkman as a reference to the 1962 film What Ever Happened to Baby Jane? Although Bjorkman did not refer to Holzer as "Baby Jane" in her "Carol Says" column until October 1964, Holzer credited her with originating the nickname.

During the summer of 1964, Holzer attracted the attention of Diana Vreeland, editor-in-chief of Vogue, while attending the Paris haute couture collections as a private client. Impressed by Holzer's distinctive appearance, particularly her teased hairstyle, Vreeland described her as "the most contemporary girl I know." She recalled later that year, "She just happened to have the greatest head of hair. And a tiny face like a narcissus. Lovely bones. She just looked great. That's all anyone's supposed to look. She just looked super." Vreeland invited Holzer to model for Vogue, and her first photographs appeared in the magazine's October 1, 1964, issue.

Holzer's hairstyle, which contrasted with the short, sculpted cuts promoted by leading Parisian hairdressers at the time, became a subject of discussion during the couture season. Vogue presented her as a symbol of individuality in fashion, describing her as "the perfect case for individuality at the top of the silhouette." Her appearance helped popularize a renewed interest in voluminous hairstyles, and she subsequently appeared on the cover of the November 1964 issues of British Vogue and Show, the magazine of the arts.

=== Andy Warhol and the Factory ===
In June 1964, Holzer first met Warhol when British magazine editor Nicky Haslam arranged a party at Holzer's Park Avenue apartment in Manhattan. The gathering also marked Warhol's first meeting with musician Mick Jagger, who was concluding his first American tour with the Rolling Stones. A few days later Holzer later encountered Warhol in front of Bloomingdale's, and he invited her to appear in his films. Warhol recalled in his 1980 memoir POPism: The Warhol '60s that he was drawn to Holzer's beauty and enthusiasm. She "wanted to do everything" and eagerly accepted his invitation to become a Warhol superstar. "Andy calls everything super," said Holzer in 1964. "I'm a super star, he's a super-director, we make super epics—and I mean, it's a completely new and natural way of acting. You can't imagine what really beautiful things can happen!"

The first film they worked on together was Soap Opera (1964). Between 1964 and 1965, Holzer appeared in ten of Warhol's Screen Tests and performed without payment in several of his underground films, including Couch (1964), Batman Dracula (1964), and Camp (1965). Her appearances in Warhol's films helped establish her as one of the most recognizable personalities in the avant-garde New York scene.

In December 1964, Holzer gained further recognition when journalist Tom Wolfe profiled her in the New York Herald Tribune, naming her the "Girl of the Year" and presenting her as a symbol of the emerging youth culture of the 1960s. The profile also quoted Vogue editor-in-chief Diana Vreeland, who described Holzer as "the most contemporary girl I know." Wolfe discussed the "Mods and Rockers Ball," a party held in October 1964 at photographer Jerry Schatzberg's studio to celebrate the Rolling Stones during their second American tour. The event coincided with Holzer's 24th birthday, and she was presented with a birthday cake.

Holzer's growing prominence was reflected in the December 7, 1964, issue of Newsweek, which described her as a Warhol superstar. The magazine wrote that, with her "mane of blond hair, her hyper-thyroid drive and buckshot hedonism," she epitomized "the pants-wearing young set who feed on the hybrid world of pop, flick, and hip."

On December 14, 1964, The New York Times fashion journalist Marilyn Bender identified Holzer as emblematic of a changing social order in which young socialites, rather than aristocrats or actresses, were setting fashion trends. Bender wrote that Holzer "symbolizes the new society and the new style" and quoted her as saying, "There is no class any more. Everybody is equal."

In the March 19, 1965, issue of Life, Holzer was featured in the article "Underground Clothes," in which she was photographed with a projected image from one of Warhol's films. In the same issue, she was profiled in the article "Way-out Baby Jane Is Really In," which described her as one of the first to embrace the avant-garde fashions of André Courrèges and emerging English designers.

In March 1966, Women's Wear Daily published a profile of Holzer by Carol Bjorkman focusing on her fashionable lifestyle and her butler, Johnny, who served as her secretary, valet, cook, and housekeeper. The article noted that Johnny, who was the same size as Holzer, tried on her clothes before she wore them, laundered her Porthault linens, and even dyed her textured stockings. Later that month, Women's Wear Daily named Holzer one of New York's "fashion revolutionaries."

Following Edie Sedgwick's emergence as Warhol's leading female star in 1965, Holzer returned to Warhol's films in late 1966 and 1967, appearing in Bufferin Commercial (1966), Sally Kirkland (1967), and Reel 39 of **** (Four Stars) (1967). In 1967, Holzer filmed the independent production Ciao! Manhattan (1972), starring Sedgwick and directed by former Warhol associate Chuck Wein.

=== Mainstream acting and music career ===
In 1965, Holzer began pursuing a mainstream entertainment career beyond Warhol's underground films. She studied acting with Sanford Meisner in New York and appeared as a guide to New York's jet-set lifestyle on the ABC television program The Wild, Wild East. She also taped a television special starring Frank Sinatra and Sammy Davis Jr. for CBS. Reflecting on her transition to mainstream acting, Holzer remarked, "Up to now, my acting roles have been so off off-Broadway, they've been practically underground." She acknowledged that "My biggest problem in Hollywood has been convincing people I'm not a kook," adding, "But I have a mind, and I want to use it."

In 1966, Holzer launched a brief singing career with the record "Boy You're Gonna Hurt Yourself." She promoted the song with performances on the television programs Hullabaloo and The Lloyd Thaxton Show in March 1966. Holzer intended to wear a nearly transparent plastic dress on Hullabaloo but was asked by the show's producer to change before filming. The publicity surrounding the appearance led to two recording contract offers. In 1967, she released the Atco Records single "Rapunzel"/"Nowhere," produced by Al Kasha and arranged by Barry Goldberg.

During a visit to Hollywood inn 1966, Holzer said of her acting ambitions, "I really don't need to work. But I like to perform." Holzer pursued opportunities in mainstream film and television. She appeared in the New York sequence of Jack of Diamonds (1967), reportedly tested for a role in Valley of the Dolls (1967), and was mentioned as a possible candidate for Who's Afraid of Virginia Woolf? (1966), although she was not cast. In March 1967, Holzer auditioned to replace Beverly Bentley in Norman Mailer's Off-Broadway adaptation of his novel The Deer Park, but was not cast. That year, she played herself at a New York party in the pilot episode of the short-lived TV series, Coronet Blue.

=== Later career ===
After leaving the Factory, Holzer remained one of Warhol's close longtime friends. They continued to socialize regularly, and Warhol frequently mentioned her in The Andy Warhol Diaries. In August 1978, she appeared on the cover of his Interview magazine.

During the 1980s, Holzer established herself as a real estate investor and developer in Palm Beach, Florida, assembling a commercial property portfolio on Worth Avenue and elsewhere in the town. By 1984, she owned a building housing tenants including Louis Vuitton, Gemini Galleries, and Mayor's Jewelers.

In February 1984, Holzer opened Sweet Baby Jane's, a gourmet ice cream shop in Palm Beach. Warhol attended its official opening party the following month. Later that year, she expanded the business with a second location in Los Angeles.

Holzer helped finance the Academy Award-winning 1985 film Kiss of the Spider Woman, after her friend producer David Weisman introduced her to Manuel Puig's novel on which the film was based. Although credited as the associate producer, Holzer later said she had "very little to do with the film."

In 2009, Holzer co-founded A.R.T., an art and jewelry gallery on Worth Avenue, where she curated an exhibition of Warhol's Diamond Dust paintings.

Holzer has remained active in Palm Beach real estate, continuing to acquire, develop, and sell residential and commercial properties on the island. Holzer owns the restaurant Le Bilboquet, where she and Philippe Delgrange are business partners.

In 2024, she partnered with developer Todd Glaser to purchase a neighboring property for redevelopment and the expansion of their adjacent estates.

In 2025, Holzer was interviewed for the documentary Gloss and Grit: The Man Who Made Art Pop, about the life and work of illustrator Richard Bernstein.

== Personal life ==
On December 2, 1962, she married New York real estate executive Leonard Holzer in the White and Gold Suite of the Plaza Hotel. He was graduate of Deerfield Academy and Princeton University. After the wedding, the couple departed on a three-month honeymoon in Europe aboard the RMS Queen Elizabeth. Upon their return, they settled in an apartment at 955 Park Avenue in Manhattan. Their son Charles “Rusty” Holzer was born in 1969, and their marriage dissolved in the 1970s. Rusty competed for the United States Virgin Islands at the 1992 Summer Olympics in show jumping, and his wife Ashley Holzer is a dressage rider who won a bronze medal for Canada at the 1988 Summer Olympics.

Holzer dated investment banker Bob Dennison in the 1970s.

Holzer is a prominent art collector. She lived in a six-story townhouse in New York, surrounded by her collection of art which includes Warhol, Keith Haring, and Jean-Michel Basquiat.

She currently resides in Palm Beach, Florida.

== Legacy ==
During the height of her fame, Holzer was viewed as representative of a new form of celebrity based on media exposure rather than a single artistic or professional achievement. In 1966, the Pocono Record columnist Jeff Cox argued that her career demonstrated how "fame begets fame," writing:

She modeled a little, got her picture taken with jet set, was seen at the big rock and roll shindigs, got her picture taken some more—and always the cute name, the smooth lanky body and the two little front teeth, bopping and swinging out in a tornado of the new, chic life. She became famous simply because her picture appeared in a lot of magazines and newspapers. She became the symbol of camp, pop art, the English rock and roll sound, all the wild new things.

In 2014, the Norton Museum of Art in West Palm Beach presented To Jane, Love Andy, an exhibition exploring Holzer's friendship with Warhol through artworks, photographs, films, and archival material.

In December 2024, Holzer was honored at the Historical Society of Palm Beach County's 22nd Annual Archival Evening.

== In pop culture ==
In November 1964, Saks Fifth Avenue unveiled window displays featuring mannequins in Holzer's likeness, based on sketches by portrait artist Piero Aversa and executed by mannequin designer Mary Brosnan.

Tom Wolfe's 1964 profile of Holzer, which named her the "Girl of the Year," was republished in his 1965 essay collection The Kandy-Kolored Tangerine-Flake Streamline Baby.

Holzer was included in Marilyn bender's 1967 book Beautiful People, describing her as part of a new generation of fashion and social figures.

Holzer was parodied as Baby Jane Towser in the 1967 Batman episode "Pop/Flop Goes the Joker", where she was played by Diana Ivarson.

Holzer is referenced as Baby Jane in the 1972 Roxy Music single "Virginia Plain."

Her 1975 portraits by Warhol were included in his retrospective Andy Warhol: A Retrospective at the Museum of Modern Art in New York City in 1979.
