= Imitation of Christ (film) =

1967 film by Andy Warhol

- Directed by: Andy Warhol
- Starring: Patrick Tilden Close; Ondine; Nico; Brigid Polk
- Distributed by: Filmmakers Distribution Center
- Release date: November 1967
- Running time: 480 min./105 min.
- Language: English

Imitation of Christ is a film shot and directed by Andy Warhol in 1967.

== Summary ==
The title for this film comes from the De imitatione Christi, a spiritual guide written in the fifteenth century by Dutch mystic/author Thomas à Kempis (1390–1471). The film itself is a realistic dramatic comedy about a handsome young man called Son, silent and moody, who spends much time in his bedroom with the family maid, who feeds him corn flakes, strokes his hair, and reads to him from the Imitatione Christi. Elsewhere in the family home, the young man's mother and father lie in bed and argue over Son, trying to analyze what's wrong with him, while, at the same time, admitting their physical attraction toward him, and lamenting over their own sad lives. Son also has angry arguments there in his home with his abrasive girlfriend, over minor matters. Intercut into the film are outdoor scenes of Son ambling through the streets of San Francisco with a hobo.

== Cast ==
- Brigid Berlin (credited as Brigid Polk) as Mother
- Bob Olivo (credited as Ondine) as Father
- Patrick Tilden Close (credited as Pat Close for previous work as a child actor in both film and television) as Son
- Nico as The Maid
- Taylor Mead as Hobo
- Andrea "Whips" Feldman as Son's Girlfriend

== Production ==
Andy Warhol shot sixteen 32-minute reels of film for all the interior shots (with all of the cast except for Taylor Mead) during January 1967 in a Hollywood Hills home called the Castle (which Warhol rented for his L.A. visits). The exterior segments with Pat Tilden Close and Taylor Mead were filmed in San Francisco parks and streets during May 1967.

A long version of the film (480 minutes) premiered in November 1967, and then was withdrawn from circulation — the long film was thought lost for many years, and then was found in the early 2000s. In December 1967, the entire eight-hour film appeared as a segment within another Warhol film, the 25-hour-long **** (aka Four Stars). In late 1969, Andy Warhol and Paul Morrissey condensed the eight-hour Imitation of Christ to 105 minutes, and re-released it under the same name.

Excerpts of Imitation of Christ were also included within the film Pie in the Sky: The Brigid Berlin Story, a 75-minute documentary about the life of actress Brigid Berlin (Brigid Polk), directed by Vincent Fremont and Shelly Dunn Fremont, produced by Vincent Fremont Enterprises, and released September 7, 2000.

== Critical reception ==
There was much praise at the initial release, calling Warhol "the equivalent of Victor Hugo", but there was much criticism of the fact the film was not released after the premiere event except in a shortened form.

== See also ==
- List of American films of 1967
- Andy Warhol filmography
- List of longest films by running time

== Sources ==
- "The American Film Institute Catalog of Motion Pictures produced in the United States, Issues 1941-1950" University of California Press (1997) ISBN 0-520-20970-2, page 524
