= Jennifer McCamley =

Australian artist (born 1957)

Jennifer McCamley (born 1957) is an Australian artist who lives and works in Melbourne, Victoria. She was born in Brisbane in 1957, and is known for her work across multiple disciplines, and her collaborations with Janet Burchill since the mid-1980s. In 2013 she was included in the major survey of contemporary art-making in Melbourne, Melbourne Now organised by the National Gallery of Victoria.

== Collaboration with Janet Burchill ==
McCamley began a working partnership with artist Janet Burchill in the mid-1980s, with numerous individual and collaborative solo exhibitions both in Australia and internationally. Their art practice interlaces feminist, psychoanalytic, filmic, semiotic and spatial concerns, with language, and the language of art, film and popular culture, central to their work.

McCamley's training in film, semiotics, and philosophy supplemented Burchill’s experience in sculpture and film. Burchill and McCamley’s art draws broadly on the histories of art and design, film and literature, feminism and cultural theory. Their collaborative practice has been sustained for thirty five years.

Their works have been included in major survey exhibitions including Australian Perspecta, Sydney, 1989; Virtual Reality, National Gallery of Australia, 1994; and Poolshoogte: Contemporary photography from Holland, Belgium and Germany, Nederlands Foto Institute, Rotterdam, 1996. A major survey of their collaborative works, Tip of the Iceberg: Selected works 1985–2001, was held in 2001 at the University Art Museum, University of Queensland, and at the Ian Potter Museum of Art, University of Melbourne.

They undertook a MAAP residency over 2009 to 2010, in order to research new solar technologies (Built-In Photovoltaics) to develop their temporary public artwork Light From Light, displayed at the State Library Queensland and the Shanghai Library, National Art Museum of China and the Hangzhou Public Library in China (2010 – 2011). As part of their residency, Burchill and McCamley visited MAAP in Brisbane in early 2009 to help scope the Light from Light exhibition concept and design.

Their interest in solar technologies has seen them undertake artist residencies at The International Art Space Kellerberrin Australia (IASKA) and the University of Wollongong to develop art and research in this area.

== Retrospective exhibition ==
In 2019, Heide Museum of Modern Art reflected on the 35 year collaboration between Burchill and McCamley through the exhibition, Temptation to Co-Exist. This collection of backlogged work is named after an earlier installation and photographic series, Temptation to Exist (1986). The exhibition commemorates the career and ouvre of Burchill and McCamley retrospectively

== Awards ==
In 1991, Burchill and McCamley were awarded the Australia Council’s Kunstlerhaus Bethanien Residency and Scholarship and the duo lived and worked in Berlin until 1997. During this period, they were jointly awarded the Berlin Senate Art Scholarship.
