= Naomi Levine =

American actress and filmmaker (1939–2007)

- Born: June 24, 1939
- Died: May 25, 2007 (aged 67)
- Occupations: Actress; artist; filmmaker

Naomi Levine (June 24, 1939 – May 25, 2007) was an American actress, artist and filmmaker. She was a friend of Jack Smith and pop artist and filmmaker Andy Warhol. In 1964, she directed the film titled Yes. In 1973, several of her films were screened at the Museum of Modern Art.

== Filmography ==
=== As actress ===
- Jack Smith, Normal Love (1963)
- Andy Warhol, Tarzan and Jane Regained... Sort of (1963) as Jane
- Andy Warhol, Naomi's Birthday Party (1963)
- Andy Warhol, Kiss (1963)
- Andy Warhol, Naomi and Rufus Kiss (1964)
- Andy Warhol, Batman Dracula (1964)
- Andy Warhol, Couch (1964)

=== As filmmaker ===
- Yes (1963)
- Jeremelu (1964)
- Optured Fraiken Chaitre Joe (1968)
- Prismatic (1968)
- From Zero to 16 (1969)
- London Bridges Falling Down (1969)
- Premoonptss (1969)
- At My Mother's House (1970)
- Zen, and the Art of Baseball (1970)
- Aspects of a Hill, Part 1: The Periphery (1971)
- Story of a Dot (1971)
- Aspects of a Hill, Part II: The Grass (1972)
