= Richard E. Berlin =

American businessman (1894–1986)

- Born: 1894
- Died: January 28, 1986 (aged 91–92); New York

Richard E. Berlin (1894–1986) was the president and chief executive officer of the Hearst Foundation.

== Work ==
In his early career Berlin directed advertising for The Smart Set and McClure's magazines. In 1919 he joined the Hearst Corporation, where he stayed until his retirement in 1973. In 1941 William Randolph Hearst personally chose him as successor to his role. In 1942, Berlin became president of the company; after Hearst's death in 1951, he became chief executive officer.

William Randolph Hearst Jr. claimed in 1991 that Berlin had suffered from Alzheimer's disease starting in the mid-1960s and that caused him to shut down several Hearst newspapers without just cause.

== Personal life ==
Berlin's daughter was Warhol superstar Brigid Berlin. He was also the godfather of writer A.J. Cronin’s youngest son.

== Death ==
Berlin died in Rye, New York on January 28, 1986.
