= Gregory Battcock =

American art critic and writer (1937–1980)

- Born: 1937
- Died: December 25, 1980 (aged 42–43); Puerto Rico
- Cause of death: murder
- Occupations: Art critic and historian, painter
- Writing career
- Notable work: The New Art

Gregory Battcock (1937–1980) was an American art historian, art critic, and painter from New York City who wrote a series of Dutton paperbacks that anthologized critical writings on new art tendencies in contemporary art, such as Minimalism, Conceptual Art, Video Art, and Super Realism. His first anthology, The New Art, was published in 1966 and revised in 1973. Idea Art: A Critical Anthology, about conceptual art, was his most impactful book.

Battcock taught at William Paterson University.

== Life and career ==
Battcock attended Michigan State University, the Accademia di Belle Arti in Rome, and Hunter College. He earned his Ph.D. from New York University in 1978 with a dissertation titled Constructivism and Minimal Art: Some Aesthetic, Theoretical and Critical Correlations.

He wrote frequently for the art magazines Art & Artists and Domus. Battcock taught fine art at William Paterson College and was art critic for the New York Free Press. In the late 1960s and early-’70s, Battcock contributed columns on art and life to tabloids such as Gay and the New York Review of Sex.

He was editor-in-chief of Arts Magazine (1973-1975). In 1977 he co-published the tabloid Trylon & Perisphere with Ron Whyte that included satiric art criticism and soft-core eroticism. He appeared in the Andy Warhol films Eating Too Fast, Horse, and Batman Dracula.

Battcock was murdered at his vacation home in San Juan, Puerto Rico on December 25, 1980. The murder remains unsolved.

The article historian, Robert Rosenblum described Battcock's life as "one long performance". The art critic David Bourdon described Battcock as a social justice fighter for civil rights and as the "most unboring person and the best traveling companion I ever met.".

== Books ==
- Idea Art: A Critical Anthology
- Minimal Art: A Critical Anthology
- The New Art: A Critical Anthology
- The New American Cinema: A Critical Anthology
- Breaking the Sound Barrier: A Critical Anthology of the New Music
- The Art of Performance: A Critical Anthology (edited with Robert Nickas)
- New Artists Video
- Super Realism
- Why Art: Casual Notes on the Aesthetics of the Immediate Past
- New Ideas in Art Education

== See also ==
- Conceptual art
- Post-conceptual art
- Institutional Critique
- Postmodern art
