= Vinyl (1965 film) =

- DVD cover
- Directed by: Andy Warhol
- Written by: Ronald Tavel
- Based on: A Clockwork Orange by Anthony Burgess
- Produced by: Andy Warhol
- Starring: Gerard Malanga; Edie Sedgwick; Ondine; Tosh Carillo
- Distributed by: The Factory
- Release date: June 4, 1965
- Running time: 70 minutes
- Country: United States
- Language: English

Vinyl is a 1965 American black-and-white film directed by Andy Warhol at The Factory. It is an early adaptation of Anthony Burgess' 1962 novel A Clockwork Orange, starring Gerard Malanga, Edie Sedgwick, Ondine, and Tosh Carillo, and featuring such songs as "Nowhere to Run" by Martha and the Vandellas, "Tired of Waiting for You" by The Kinks, "The Last Time" by The Rolling Stones and "Shout" by The Isley Brothers.

== Plot ==
The film is about the youth perpetrator Victor, who spends his time lifting weights, dancing and torturing people. When he hits his friend Scum Baby, he calls the police. Victor gets the choice to go to jail or undergo a behavioral change. Victor decides on the treatment and is bound to a chair by a doctor. He has to watch violent videos and describe what is happening on the screen while warm wax from a candle runs over his hand. After a while Victor swears off the violence and is unbound. He rejects the doctor's request to beat him and take drugs. Victor is cured.

== Cast ==
- Gerard Malanga as Victor
- Edie Sedgwick as Extra
- Ondine as Scum Baby
- Tosh Carillo as The Doctor
- Larry Latrae
- J.D. McDermott as Cop
- Jacques Potin as Extra

== Background ==
Vinyl was the first adaptation of the novel, which was filmed six years later by Stanley Kubrick (as A Clockwork Orange). Warhol bought the book in the spring of 1965 and forwarded it to his screenwriter Ronald Tavel. He had claimed that he had secured the right to the story for $3,000. The film is solely based on the original and reproduces the plot in a very condensed form and the names of the characters have also changed.

The recording of Vinyl took place on a day in April / early May 1965 with a very low budget and the only location in the film is a corner in Warhol's Factory while the 16mm black and white camera, the Auricon brand, that stood on a stand barely moved.

Vinyl was originally supposed to consist of a purely male casting and bring out Gerard Malanga; but since the model Edie Sedgwick, who Warhol had met earlier the same year, coincidentally showed up for photography, Warhol gave her the last minute role in the strip. Some of the extras in Vinyl did not even realize that they were filmed and had no connection to the plot.

The movie features the songs "Nowhere to Run" by Martha and the Vandellas, "Tired of Waiting for You" by The Kinks, "The Last Time" by The Rolling Stones and "Shout" by The Isley Brothers. "Nowhere to Run" is played twice in full length while the artists dance to it.

Vinyl was shown the first time on June 4, 1965 as part of Jonas Mekas' Film-Makers' Cinematheque listing.

Stanley Kubrick's 1971 film, as well as Vinyl, begins with a close-up of the protagonist's face. Why the movie is called Vinyl is unclear.

== Production ==
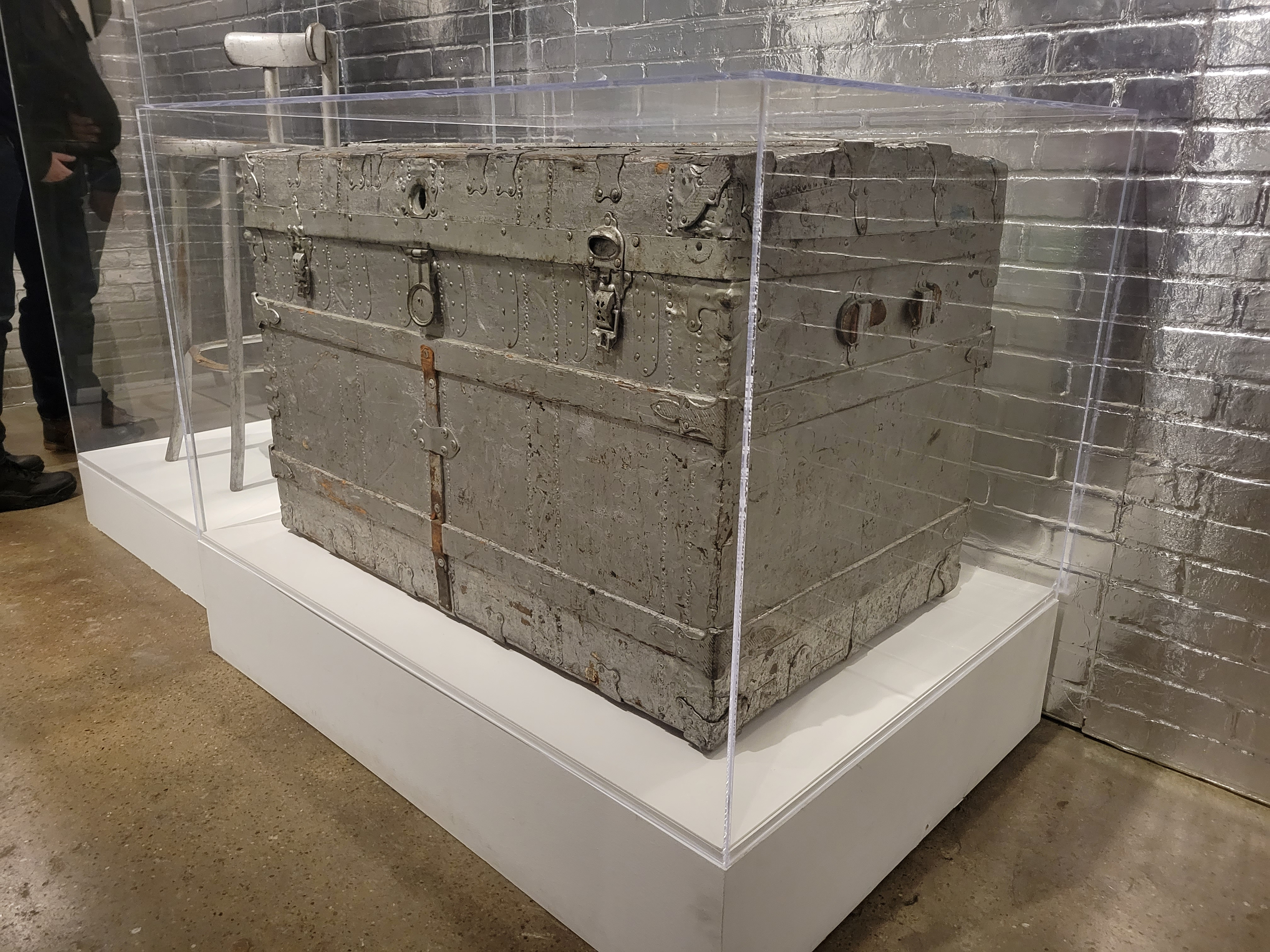
The trunk on which Edie Sedgwick sits in the film is now on display at the Andy Warhol Museum in Pittsburgh, Pennsylvania.

Vinyl is often credited as Edie Sedgwick's first appearance in film, although she actually appeared in a non-speaking role in the earlier Warhol movie Horse (1965). Sedgwick has no lines of dialogue in the entire film. Vinyl was filmed unrehearsed and was also performed live in various stage productions.

== Legacy ==
Vinyl is included in the book 1001 Movies You Must See Before You Die. Coincidentally, a HBO series by the name of Vinyl had Warhol as a recurring character; despite this the series has nothing in common with the Warhol film because it is about music in New York rather than art.

== See also ==
- List of American films of 1965
- Andy Warhol filmography
