= Abigail McGrath =

American actor and writer (1940–2024)

- Born: Abigail Chalachaly Hubbell; September 18, 1940; New York City, U.S.
- Died: December 20, 2024 (aged 84); New York City, U.S.
- Other name: Abigail Rosen
- Education: Bard College
- Occupations: Actress; playwright; theater producer
- Spouse(s): Leonard Rosen (divorced); Anthony McGrath (m. 2016)
- Children: 2
- Mother: Helene Johnson

Abigail Calachaly McGrath (née Hubbell; September 18, 1940 – December 20, 2024), also known as Abigail Rosen, was an American actress, playwright, and theater producer. She co-founded the Off Center Theater in Manhattan, an Off-Off-Broadway company renowned for its experimental and children's productions. She later founded the Renaissance House Writers and Artists Retreat on Martha's Vineyard. Earlier in her career, she was part of the Factory scene and appeared in Pop artist Andy Warhol's underground film Tub Girls (1967).

== Early life and education ==
Abigail Calachaly Hubbell was born on September 18, 1940, in Manhattan, New York City, the only child of the Harlem Renaissance poet Helene Johnson and William Warner Hubbell III, a stevedore who later worked as a subway conductor. Her middle name, Calachaly, was inspired by an imaginary childhood friend created by her mother.

McGrath was raised in the Fort Greene neighborhood of Brooklyn in what she later described as "genteel poverty", with regular outings to the theater and opera. She attended the Little Red School House before graduating from Washington Irving High School in Manhattan.

She studied theater arts at Bard College in Annandale-on-Hudson, New York where she married fellow student Leonard Rosen and had a son, Jason. After graduating, McGrath and her son spent several weeks in Paris, where she worked as a mannequin, or non-dancing showgirl, at the Folies Bergère.

== Career ==
=== Max's Kansas City and early acting career ===
After returning to New York from Paris, McGrath supported herself through a variety of jobs while pursuing an acting career. She worked as an advertising copywriter, model, and improviser, and operated coat-check concessions at the Greenwich Village venues Your Father's Mustache and the Village Vanguard. Through a recommendation from her friend Johanna Lawrenson, McGrath met nightclub owner Mickey Ruskin, who hired her as the first person to work the door at Max's Kansas City, the Manhattan nightclub frequented by artists, musicians, and members of Pop artist Andy Warhol's Factory.

McGrath became acquainted with model Susan Hoffmann (Viva) through a mutual friend. She later recalled encouraging Hoffmann to pursue acting and to ask Warhol for a role in one of his films. In 1967, McGrath appeared in Tub Girls alongside Hoffmann, becoming one of the few Black performers to appear in a Warhol film. McGrath was paid $100 for her appearance, which she used to pay her rent. Although she had hoped the role would lead to a film career, she instead turned her focus to theater.

In December 1968, McGrath appeared in Beclch, an Off-Broadway play by Rochelle Owens, directed by Don Signore at the Gate Theatre in New York City.

=== The Off Center Theater ===
In 1968, McGrath co-founded the Off Center Theater in Manhattan with Anthony McGrath, whom she later married. The theater was initially based in a church on West 66th Street in Manhattan. The company produced free performances for children, often touring schools, parks, and underserved neighborhoods throughout New York City. Its children's productions featured unconventional adaptations of classic fairy tales, including Cinderella and Little Red Riding Hood. In 1969, McGrath appeared as Mrs. Giant in a production of Jack and the Beanstalk.

The theater produced works by playwrights including Trevor Griffiths, Barry Keefe, Neal Bell, and Norman Wexler. It also provided an venue for actors including Christine Baranski, Peter Boyle, Dominic Chianese, Ron McLarty, F. Murray Abraham, and John Leguizamo.

Despite critical acclaim, Off Center Theater operated on a limited budget supported by grants, donations, and fundraising. In 1979, a dispute between the Off-Off Broadway Alliance and Actors' Equity Association over working conditions forced Off Center Theater to cancel its six-play fall season. During the shutdown, McGrath and the company expanded Your Daily Bread, a bakery business they had established to supplement the theater's finances, supplying baked goods to restaurants and theater-related businesses in Manhattan.

In a 1981 review of Neal Bell's Operation Midnight Climax, The New York Times theater critic Mel Gussow praised the production and Baranski's performance, while The Village Voice described the company in 1983 as "outrageously funny and brilliant."

In 1989, McGrath and Anthony McGrath sold the company's headquarters on West 18th Street, but the theater continued to stage productions through 2017.

=== Later years ===
In 2001, McGrath founded the Renaissance House Writers and Artists Retreat in Oak Bluffs, Massachusetts in honor of her mother and cousin Dorothy West, a Harlem Renaissance writer. Renaissance House became a space for writers, particularly those addressing social issues and from underrepresented backgrounds, to focus on their craft. The retreat also hosted annual readings of Frederick Douglass's speech, "What to the Slave is the Fourth of July?".

In 2004, McGrath wrote the screenplay for Au Pair Chocolat, a comedy directed by her son Benson McGrath about a Harlem mother who becomes an au pair on Martha's Vineyard. The film starred Domenica Cameron-Scorsese, daughter of filmmaker Martin Scorsese.

== Personal life ==
McGrath married fellow student Leonard Rosen while attending Bard College. They had a son, Jason, and divorced prior to her graduation. She lived with actor Anthony McGrath from the late 1960s until his death in 2018. The couple married in 2016. Their son, Benson McGrath, is an attorney and filmmaker.

== Death ==
McGrath died on December 20, 2024, in Manhattan at the age of 84 due to liver cancer. She is survived by two sons and a granddaughter.

== In pop culture ==
In 1968, McGrath was photographed by Philippe Halsman at the Life magazine studio as part of Andy Warhol's entourage from the Factory.

McGrath's experiences inspired aspects of her cousin Dorothy West's novel The Wedding (1995), which was adapted into a miniseries by Oprah Winfrey.
