= Sunrise at Campobello =

1960 American biographical film

- Theatrical release poster
- Directed by: Vincent J. Donehue
- Screenplay by: Dore Schary
- Based on: Sunrise at Campobello; 1958 play by Dore Schary
- Produced by: Dore Schary
- Starring: Ralph Bellamy; Greer Garson; Hume Cronyn; Jean Hagen
- Cinematography: Russell Harlan
- Edited by: George Boemler
- Music by: Franz Waxman
- Distributed by: Warner Bros. Pictures
- Release date: September 28, 1960
- Running time: 144 minutes
- Country: United States
- Language: English

Sunrise at Campobello is a 1960 American biographical film which dramatizes the struggles of future U.S. President Franklin D. Roosevelt and his family when Roosevelt was stricken with paralysis at the age of 39 in August 1921. Based on Dore Schary's 1958 Tony Award-winning Broadway play of the same title, the film was directed by Vincent J. Donehue and stars Ralph Bellamy, Greer Garson, Hume Cronyn and Jean Hagen.

The film was produced with the cooperation of the Roosevelt family. Eleanor Roosevelt was present on the set during location shooting at the Roosevelt estate in Hyde Park, New York.

== Plot ==
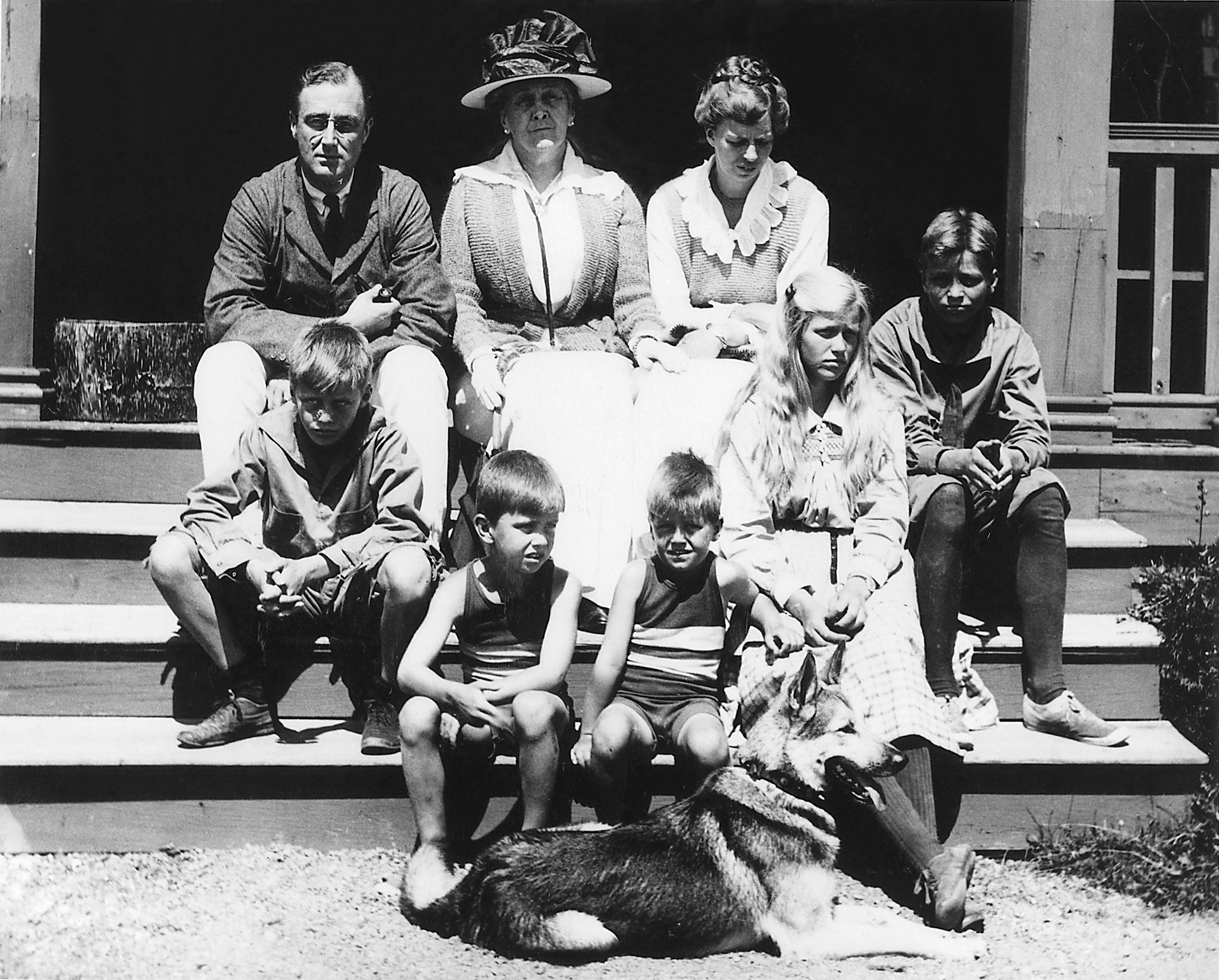
The Roosevelt family at Campobello, 1920

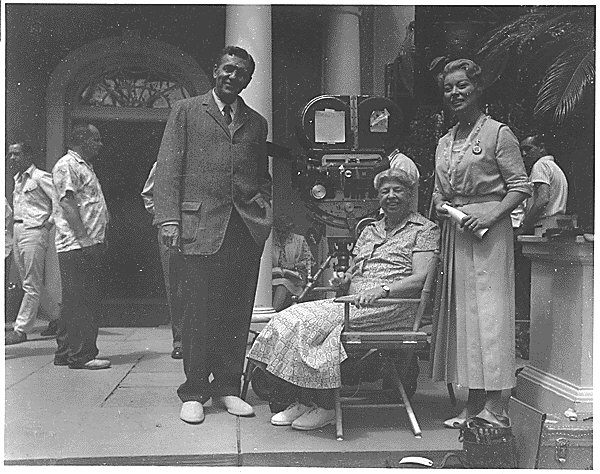
(l-r) Ralph Bellamy, Eleanor Roosevelt and Greer Garson at Hyde Park, New York filming Sunrise at Campobello in 1960.

During the summer of 1921, Franklin D. Roosevelt relaxes at his summer home on Campobello Island, New Brunswick (on the border with Maine) with his wife Eleanor and their five children. At the time, Roosevelt was a private lawyer in New York, who had lost as a vice presidential candidate on the Democratic ticket during the 1920 presidential election.

Early one morning, Franklin collapses on the floor, complaining one of his legs felt weak. He calls for Eleanor, who helps her husband to bed. After a few days, Franklin develops a fever and is diagnosed with infantile paralysis. Louis Howe, Franklin's close political adviser, arrives and tends to him.

Franklin's mother Sara arrives from overseas to see her bedridden son. She openly dislikes Howe, calling him a "little man" and despises his smoking habits. Sara recommends for Franklin to recuperate at Hyde Park and advocates against her son's future plans for public office. Howe disagrees, believing Franklin's political future is "ordained."

By the end of the summer, the press has reported Franklin's polio but anticipates a full recovery. As the Roosevelts leave Campobello, and to protect Franklin's career, Howe arranges for Sara and the children to lure the press away from Franklin, who is transported separately by stretcher to a different ferry. Franklin is next transported by train to New York City, where he is admitted into the Presbyterian Hospital.

In May 1922, Franklin has returned home in New York City, confined to a wheelchair. After he dictates his prepared speeches with his secretary Marguerite "Missy" LeHand, Franklin confides to Eleanor about feeling lonely and has had nightmares about being trapped in a fire. In case of a future emergency, he teaches himself to crawl and believes the "fire" symbolizes his condition. Therefore, he must endure them by having "to crawl before he can walk."

In July 1923, at Hyde Park, Franklin tells Eleanor he feels "sure-footed" despite his paralysis, and that his public statements and Eleanor's speeches has kept him mentally alert. He then reflects on her marriage with Eleanor, which was opposed by their respective families, and admits being haughty when he was a young man.

In January 1924, the Roosevelts return to New York City. While Franklin dictates another speech with Missy, Sara visits and discourages her son from overworking himself. Elsewhere, Eleanor stumbles through a campaign speech before an all-female audience, but afterwards expresses growth as a public speaker. After a family dinner, Sara and Franklin argue, in which she advises he does not seek public office and to improve the world through philanthropy. Franklin argues otherwise, and when Sara leaves, he uses his crutches to lift himself from his wheelchair.

By June 1924, New York Governor Alfred E. Smith campaigns for the Democratic nomination as president. Openly Catholic, Smith faces strong bias from anti-Catholic delegates before the party convention. Mr. Lassiter, a political adviser, visits Franklin and urges him to prepare a nominating speech for Smith. Howe convinces Franklin to deliver the speech as his political comeback. Eleanor agrees, but cautions he will have to stand for forty-five minutes.

While Smith visits Franklin, he secures Franklin's support for the Democratic nomination, but objects to any endorsement for the League of Nations. After Smith leaves, Franklin arranges to get a blueprint of the area of Madison Square Garden, where the convention will take place. On the night of the party convention, Franklin's son James Roosevelt wheels his father to the podium. Franklin walks to the speaker's rostrum, aided by heavy leg braces and crutches, and is cheered by the delegates.

== Cast ==
- Ralph Bellamy as Franklin D. Roosevelt
- Greer Garson as Eleanor Roosevelt
- Hume Cronyn as Louis Howe
- Jean Hagen as Marguerite "Missy" LeHand
- Ann Shoemaker as Sara Roosevelt
- Alan Bunce as Governor Alfred E. Smith
- Tim Considine as James Roosevelt
- Zina Bethune as Anna Roosevelt
- Frank Ferguson as Dr. Bennett
- Pat Close as Elliott Roosevelt
- Robin Warga as Franklin Roosevelt Jr.
- Tom Carty as Johnny Roosevelt
- Lyle Talbot as Mr. Brimmer
- David White as Mr. Lassiter
- Walter Sande as Captain Skinner
- Herbert Anderson as Vincent Dailey

Director Dore Schary had originally considered Anthony Quayle for the role of Roosevelt until Schary's wife suggested Bellamy.

== Production ==
Sunrise at Campobello presents events that took place over three years, from August 1921 to July 1924, culminating in Roosevelt's speech at the 1924 Democratic National Convention. Before and during Roosevelt's presidency, the extent of his disability was minimized. Sunrise at Campobello depicts the debilitating effects of his paralytic illness to a greater extent than had been previously disclosed by the media.

Exteriors were filmed at the Home of Franklin D. Roosevelt National Historic Site, the Roosevelt Campobello International Park on Campobello Island and the Roosevelts' former Manhattan residence. Interiors were shots on sets at Warner Bros. Pictures. The Shrine Auditorium in Los Angeles was used to represent for Madison Square Garden for the 1924 convention.

The film was scored by Franz Waxman.

== Release ==
Sunrise at Campobello faced competition from Elmer Gantry, The World of Suzy Wong, The Apartment and Butterfield 8, films that all dealt with sex and that impacted the box-office performance of Sunrise at Campobello. At the time the film was made, Roosevelt's affair with Lucy Mercer was not generally known and could not be portrayed on screen.

The film was entered into the 2nd Moscow International Film Festival. At its screening on July 19, 1961, at the Russia Theatre, the audience started to leave within minutes. More than 2,000 attendees departed before the end of the screening, possibly after realizing that the film did not depict the war years.

== Reception ==
Bosley Crowther of The New York Times called Sunrise at Campobello "a well-done, moving biographical film" and wrote: "Ralph Bellamy's performance of Mr. Roosevelt is every bit as strong, as full of feeling and characteristic gesture, as Mr. Bellamy made it on the stage. ... However, it must be mentioned that a tendency to overdo some of the famous Roosevelt expressions ... induces a bit of vexation, especially when they are shown in close-up, which glaringly discloses their forced and theatrical quality." Crowther also criticized Greer Garson's "singsong manner of speech" that sounded like a caricature of Eleanor Roosevelt's voice.

Thomas M. Pryor for Variety wrote that the film "...loses none of its poignant and inspirational qualities." He called Bellamy "brilliant", and noted Garson's "deeply moving, multifaceted characterization." The Hollywood Reporter concluded that "the play was an excellent job and has been improved upon." Harrison's Reports wrote: "Expertly directed by Vincent J. Donehue, who directed the stage success, the entire cast renders far above-average performances. Ralph Bellamy recreates his memorable stage portrayal of Roosevelt; Greer Garson delivers an Oscar-worthy performance as Eleanor."

Time magazine positively wrote: "The direction by Vincent J. Donehue, who also did the play, shows a calm good sense of pace and proportion. The acting in the minor roles is competent, and in three of the major ones it is, in one degree or another, magnificent." More recently, Darragh O'Donoghue considers the film a hagiography but notes: "Hume Cronyn is the heart and soul of the film as Louis Howe, FDR's right-hand man, an asthmatic whose relish for the 'real world' of compromised politics disgusts FDR’s patrician mother played with haughty relish by Ann Shoemaker."

On the review aggregator website Rotten Tomatoes, 88% of 8 critics' reviews are positive, with an average rating of 7.8/10.

=== Accolades ===
Award	Category	Nominee(s)	Result	Ref.
Academy Awards	Best Actress	Greer Garson	Nominated	
Academy Awards	Best Art Direction (Color)	Art Direction: Edward Carrere; Set Decoration: George James Hopkins	Nominated	
Academy Awards	Best Costume Design (Color)	Marjorie Best	Nominated	
Academy Awards	Best Sound	Warner Bros. Studio Sound Department, George Groves, sound director	Nominated	
Golden Globe Awards	Best Motion Picture – Drama		Nominated	
Golden Globe Awards	Best Actress – Motion Picture Drama	Greer Garson	Won	

== See also ==
- List of American films of 1960
- Franklin D. Roosevelt's paralytic illness
