= Ondine (actor) =

American actor

- Born: Robert Xavier Francis Peter Michael Olivo; June 16, 1937; New York City, US
- Died: April 28, 1989 (aged 51); New York City, US
- Other name: Pope Ondine
- Occupation: Actor

Robert Olivo (June 16, 1937 – April 28, 1989), better known by his stage name Ondine, was an American actor. His energetic and improvisational performances made him one of the central personalities at Andy Warhol's Factory scene during the 1960s. He appeared in numerous Warhol films, including Couch (1964), Horse (1965), Vinyl (1965), Chelsea Girls (1966), **** (1967), and The Loves of Ondine (1967).

== Biography ==
=== Early life and career ===
Ondine was born Robert Xavier Francis Peter Michael Olivo in Brooklyn, New York, on June 16, 1937. An only child, he was raised by his Italian mother Ann, who encouraged his theatrical interests from an early age. As a youth, he participated in church activities as an altar boy and became known among friends in Jamaica, Queens, for his wit and flamboyant personality. He attended Catholic school on scholarship, but by his senior year, school officials threatened to withhold the scholarship. "I was caught in the men's room teaching some black boys to cha-cha," he said.

In 1954, he adopted the name "Ondine" after a friend remarked that he resembled the title character of Jean Giraudoux's play Ondine while emerging from the ocean at Riis Park beach. He later recalled that the nickname became "a full-fledged identity" during his high school years.

Ondine pursued various artistic interests, including briefly attending fashion design school and working as an extra in productions at the Metropolitan Opera. He later became involved in the early Off-off-Broadway scene at Joe Cino's Caffe Cino in Greenwich Village, where he performed in experimental productions and comic readings. His flamboyant personality and improvisational humor made him a notable figure within the downtown theater community.

=== Andy Warhol and the Factory ===
By the early 1960s, the rise of illicit amphetamine laboratories contributed to the emergence of a subculture of heavy stimulant users known as "speed freaks." Ondine became associated with this milieu and was known for the quick, nonstop speech commonly linked to amphetamine use. In 1963, he introduced his friend Billy Linich (later Billy Name) to amphetamines. Soon, they both became prominent figures at Pop artist Andy Warhol's studio, the Factory.

Ondine first encountered Pop artist Andy Warhol at a gathering hosted by La Monte Young. Ondine later recalled noticing Warhol observing the scene silently from the back of the room: "The first time I met Warhol I had him thrown out of an apartment. I said, 'I do not want this voyeur in here.' He looked like a gray specter. I didn't give a good goddam who he was. There were the beginnings of an orgy and he was staring... They got rid of him. That made him love me in a strange way."

Beginning with films such as Couch (1964) and Batman Dracula (1964), Ondine appeared in numerous Warhol productions throughout the mid-1960s. His performances in Horse (1965), Vinyl (1965), Restaurant (1965), and Chelsea Girls (1966) helped establish his reputation within the underground film scene.

Ondine remained friends with fellow Warhol superstar Edie Sedgwick after her departure from the Factory in 1966. He recalled an unsuccessful attempt to reunite Sedgwick with Warhol for a film in 1967. Ondine said he had "never seen Warhol walk away from his camera in a fit of just absolute, abject disgust but during that filming ... he just said, 'Stop, I won't film anymore.'" They had filmed a "small scene that was later called Ondine and Edie.... My lover and a couple of other people watched it at the Factory once and they asked Warhol to please take it off. Someone said it was literally the most painful movie he'd ever seen in his life."

Ondine was sometimes known as "Pope Ondine," a nickname given to him by his friend Danny Fields. "Pope because to me he was very regal, always in command, a very high authority," Fields said.

His rapid-fire monologues, confrontational wit, and theatrical manner made him a favorite subject of Warhol's. Warhol based his 1968 book A: A Novel largely on tape-recorded conversations featuring Ondine.

=== Later years and death ===
After his years at the Factory, Ondine continued acting in independent films, including Dream Sphinx Opera (1972), Sugar Cookies (1973), and Silent Night, Bloody Night (1974). He also resumed performing in Off-off-Broadway productions, appearing with the Hot Peaches theater troupe and in productions by Jackie Curtis and Ray Dobbins.

After films from the Silver Factory era were withdrawn from circulation, Ondine sought to preserve his work by obtaining prints from Warhol. He was able to secure copies of Vinyl, The Chelsea Girls, and The Loves of Ondine. Throughout the 1970s and 1980s, Ondine traveled extensively to colleges and film societies, screening Warhol's films and delivering lectures about his experience at the Factory.

During the mid-1980s, Ondine experienced the deaths of numerous friends and former associates from AIDS-related illnesses, including his former partner Roger Jaccoby.

Ondine spent his final months at his mother’s home in Queens, surrounded by opera recordings and memorabilia related to Maria Callas. He died of AIDS-related liver disease on April 28, 1989, at the age of 51.

== In pop culture ==
He was portrayed in the film I Shot Andy Warhol by Michael Imperioli.

== Filmography ==
- Batman Dracula (1964)
- Couch (1964)
- Raw Weekend (1964)
- Afternoon (1965)
- Restaurant (1965)
- Vinyl (1965)
- Horse (1965)
- Chelsea Girls (1966)
- Since (1966)
- Edie and Ondine (1967)
- Four Stars aka **** (1967)
- The Loves of Ondine (1967)
- Dream Sphinx Opera (1972)
- Sugar Cookies (1973)
- Silent Night, Bloody Night (1974)
- Kunst Life (1975)
- L'Amico Fried's Glamorous Friends (1976)

== See also ==
- New Andy Warhol Garrick Theatre
