= Pat Close =

American actor

- Publicity Photo of Pat Close
- Born: Patrick Tilden Close; June 1, 1948; Los Angeles, California, U.S.
- Died: February 15, 1988 (aged 39); Hollywood, California, U.S.
- Other names: Patrick Tilden Bauvellis
- Occupation: Actor
- Years active: 1960–1983

Patrick Tilden "Pat" Close (June 1, 1948 – February 15, 1988) was an American child actor who later appeared in the 1967 Andy Warhol film Imitation of Christ.

== Career ==
Close began his career at the age of 11, when he was discovered while appearing in a stage production of Auntie Mame in Hollywood. He made his film debut as a young Elliott Roosevelt in 1960, in the biographical film Sunrise at Campobello. For the remainder of the decade, he guest starred on various television series. Close continued his acting career in his late teenage years from 1967 to 1970 as one of Andy Warhol's film stars. He played the lead role of "The Son" in the 1967 Warhol film Imitation of Christ. There was speculation at the time that Close would have become a new James Dean if Warhol had released the film into general distribution, instead of allowing only a single premiere presentation. Other reviews, however, disagreed, saying he was "awkward" and "unprofessional."

Close continued to work with Warhol after 1970, not so much as an actor in Warhol's films, but more as a contributor to such projects as Andy Warhol's Interview magazine.

After 1980, he continued acting in movies, credited as Patrick Close, in minor roles for such low-budget productions as Roger Corman's Space Raiders (1983).

== Death ==
On February 15, 1988, Close died of "fatty metamorphosis of the liver" at the age of 39. The coroner's report indicated that Close's death was due to alcoholism.

== Filmography ==
| Year | Title | Role | Notes |
|---|---|---|---|
| 1960 | Sunrise at Campobello | Elliott Roosevelt | |
| 1960 | The Tab Hunter Show | Chris Morgan | 2 episodes |
| 1961 | The Donna Reed Show | Butch | Episode: "Character Building" |
| 1961 | The Danny Thomas Show | | Episode: "Rusty, the Millionaire" |
| 1961 | General Electric Theater | Joey McQueen | Episode: "Open House" |
| 1961 | The Tom Ewell Show | Andy Bishop | Episode: "Big Brother" |
| 1961 | The Rifleman | Noah Fergus | Episode: "The Queue" |
| 1962 | The Twilight Zone | Hudson | Episode: "The Changing of the Guard |
| 1963 | Dennis the Menace | Freddy Thorpe | Episode: "Dennis Goes to Washington" |
| 1967 | Imitation of Christ | The Son | Credited as Patrick |
| 1983 | Space Raiders | 2nd Guard | Credited as Patrick Close |
