= Abandoned (1955 film) =

1955 Italian film

- Directed by: Francesco Maselli
- Screenplay by: Francesco Maselli; Aggeo Savioli; Eriprando Visconti
- Story by: Eriprando Visconti
- Produced by: Nicola Caracciolo; Franco Cucchini
- Starring: Lucia Bosè; Jean-Pierre Mocky; Ivy Nicholson; Isa Miranda
- Cinematography: Gianni Di Venanzo
- Edited by: Antonietta Zita
- Music by: Giovanni Fusco
- Production company: C.V.C.
- Distributed by: Titanus
- Release date: 29 August 1955 (Venice Film Festival)
- Running time: 102/75 minutes
- Country: Italy
- Languages: Italian; German

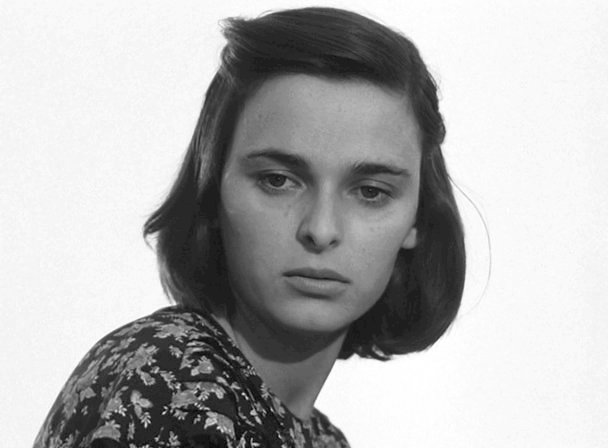
Lucia Bosè as Lucia

Abandoned (Italian: Gli sbandati) is a 1955 Italian drama film set during World War II directed by Francesco Maselli. It was Maselli's feature film debut.

In 2008, the film was included in the Italian Ministry of Cultural Heritage's 100 Italian films to be saved, a list of 100 films that "have changed the collective memory of the country between 1942 and 1978."

== Plot ==
Italy, in the summer of 1943: Countess Luisa, widow of a factory owner, and her son Andrea live in their country villa outside of their hometown Milan, where they reside since the outbreak of World War II. There they host two of Andrea's peers, his cousin Carlo, the son of a fascist official who fled to Switzerland, and his friend Ferruccio, son of a Royal Army officer engaged in the war. The three young men live a life of ease, confronted with the war only through the broadcasts of Radio London. When displaced persons arrive in the village, Andrea, rather out of compliance than solidarity, accepts to take five of them in at the villa, to the annoyance of his mother.

Among the five evacuees is young worker Lucia, whom Andrea falls in love with. He tries to impress her by telling her that the family secretly listens to Radio London, but Lucia maintains her distance. The aggrieved Andrea blames her for regarding him as weak in return. After the Armistice of Cassibile, Luisa returns to Milan, while Andrea, Carlo and Ferruccio stay behind at the villa. In the absence of his mother, towards whom he is in complete awe, Andrea seems to mature. When a group of Italian soldiers escape from a German convoy that was taking them to the labor camps, he finds the courage to hide them in the villa, supported by Carlo and Lucia.

Ferruccio denounces the escapees to the city's old fascist authorities, who inform the Germans. Upon his return, he is beaten by Andrea, who has heard of Ferruccio's betrayal from a local, and locked in. In the early morning hours, the runaway soldiers, together with Lucia and Carlo, enter a villager's truck to escape to their various destinations. At this moment, the countess arrives, accompanied by a German officer, and Andrea loses all former initiative. Instead of entering the truck with the others as intended, he agrees to stay with his mother, looked upon with disappointment by Lucia. A short while later, Andrea hears gunshots and falls into despair, realising that the Germans have caught up with the truck. The last scene shows a group of German soldiers observing the dead bodies of Lucia and one of the escapees, while the truck continues its journey.

== Cast ==
- Lucia Bosè – Lucia
- Isa Miranda – Contessa Luisa
- Jean-Pierre Mocky – Andrea
- Goliarda Sapienza – Lucia's aunt
- Antonio De Teffè – Carlo
- Leonardo Botta – Ferruccio
- Marco Guglielmi – Scattered soldiers' officer
- Giuliano Montaldo – Scattered soldier from Tuscany
- Ivy Nicholson – Isabella, Andrea's girlfriend
- Fernando Birri – Scattered soldiers' lieutenant
- Franco Lantieri – Scattered soldier from Veneto
- Giulio Paradisi
- Joop van Hulzen
- Mario Girotti (as Marco Girotti)
- Manfred Freidbager
- Bianca Maria Ferrari
- Dori Ghezzi

== Production ==
The villa featured in the film was owned by the conductor Arturo Toscanini. It is located in the comune of Ripalta Guerina near Cremona, northern Italy.

The music, written and conducted by Giovanni Fusco, was orchestrated by Ennio Morricone, then Fusco's assistant.

== Release ==
The film was presented at the 1955 Venice Film Festival, where it received a special mention.
