= Victor Arimondi =

Italian-American photographer (1942–2001)

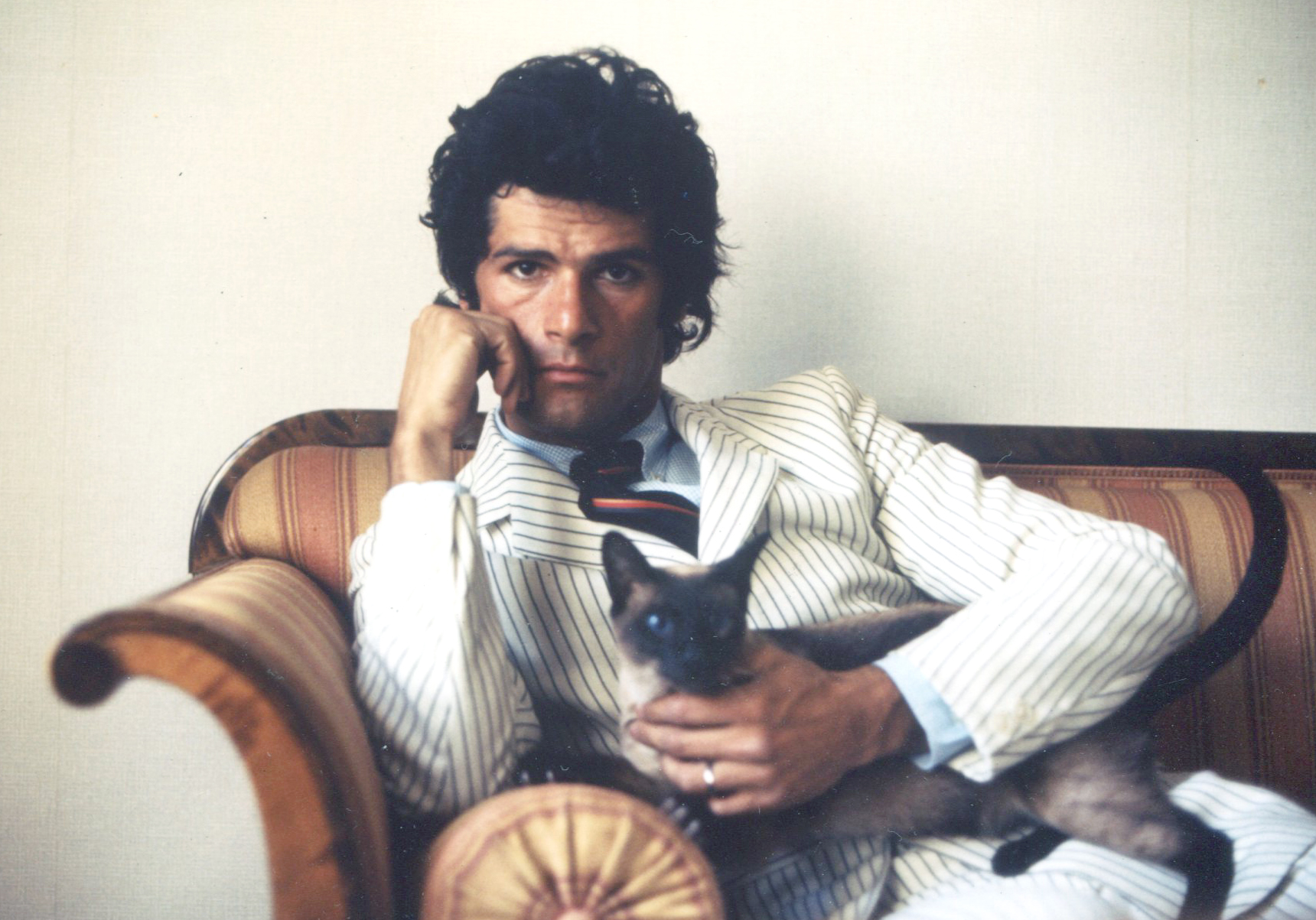
- Born: Vittorio Maria Tevitti; November 8, 1942; Bologna, Italy
- Died: July 24, 2001 (aged 58); San Francisco, California, U.S.
- Education: University College of Arts, Crafts and Design, Stockholm, Sweden
- Known for: Photography

Victor Arimondi (November 8, 1942 – July 24, 2001) was an Italian American photographer and model who lived and worked in Europe before moving to the United States in the late 1970s. His early fashion photography, his portraits of Grace Jones and other artists, and his male nudes photographed in New York and San Francisco captured the pre-AIDS culture of the 1970s and early 1980s.

Arimondi's nudes were collected in several books, including David Leddick's award-winning The Male Nude, (New York: Taschen 1998, 2005 and 2015). The photographer's later work documented homeless individuals in San Francisco's Tenderloin neighborhood and the toll of the AIDS epidemic on the city. His photographs, featured in several posthumous exhibitions, also are in the collections of Sweden's museum of modern art, Moderna Museet, and San Francisco's GLBT Historical Society.

== Biography ==
Arimondi was born Vittorio Maria Tevitti to his unwed mother, Alessandra Calligaris, in Bologna, Italy on November 8, 1942. His mother struggled financially, which left an impression on her only child. In 1948, she temporarily left him at a children's boarding school and orphanage in Italy to move to Sweden for a job. There she met and married Bruno Arimondi, who adopted her son. The family returned to Naples, Italy in 1952 where Victor graduated from high school.

In 1960, Arimondi returned to Sweden to study at the University College of Arts, Crafts and Design in Stockholm, although he did not graduate. Meanwhile, he worked at several blue collar jobs, including as a mailman, before he gave up on traditional full-time work to pursue what he considered more essential— a life of creative expression. He created costume-like clothing for himself and friends and at age 19 became a fashion model.

Even as a teenager, the Italian born photographer who spent his 20s and 30s primarily based in Sweden, noted that he preferred fantasy to the trials of real life. That conflict, and his passion for beauty as well as his sexual energy, were major factors in his life and his work.

From 1965 through 1972 Arimondi worked as model in London, Milan, Germany, New York and Stockholm, appearing in catalogs and fashion magazines including Vogue, Harper's Bazaar and Esquire and on the runway in several Valentino fashion shows.

In 1972 he decided to try working on the other side of the lens as a photographer to better express his creativity.

Arimondi moved to New York in 1979 and continued to build his photography portfolio.

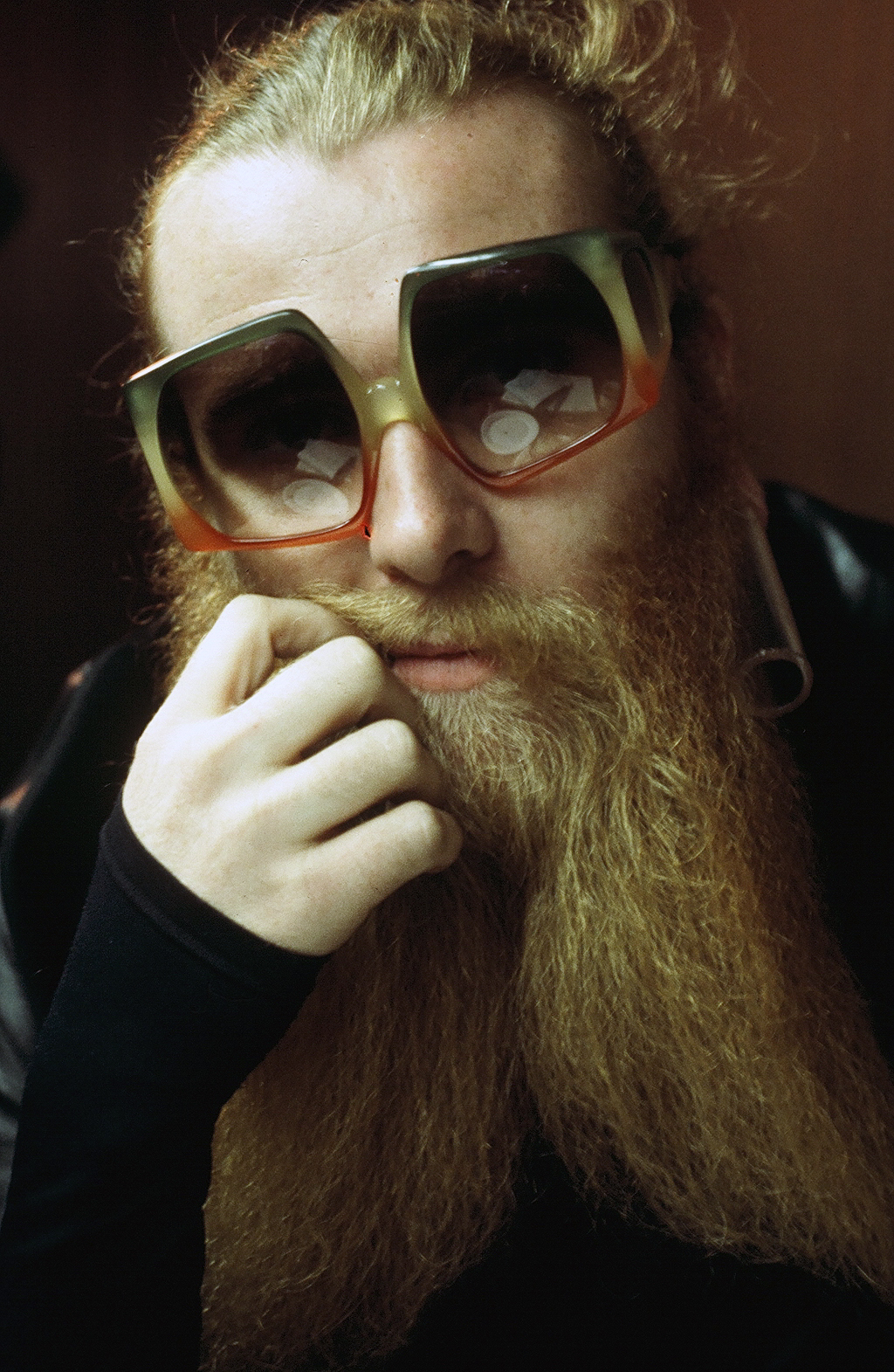
Portrait of Bearded Man, New York City, 1979

Two years later, in 1981, he moved to San Francisco where he lived and worked for twenty years until his death of AIDS at age 58 on July 24, 2001.

The year he moved to San Francisco, Arimondi opened a photo gallery in the Haight-Ashbury neighborhood for a short time. When he struggled financially, he gave up on trying to earn a living through commercial fashion photography and closed the gallery.

Arimondi returned to modeling for the financial benefits, though he did so on less of an international scale than in his early years.

He continued to create photographic portraits of the denizens of the San Francisco gay and arts cultures, to shoot male nudes and publish his work in magazines, and he began to compose and photograph evocative still lifes using his own photographic images. Many of them touched on the death of dozens of his former photography models from AIDS.

Arimondi was in the midst of a new photography project that brought together his background as a fashion photographer and his more recent social documentary work when he died several months after he learned he was HIV-positive. The project featured his former colleague, haute couture cover model Ivy Nicholson, who he found living homeless in San Francisco. Several of the haunting portraits he took of her were later included in a noted group exhibit at SF Camerawork.

== Art ==
Arimondi's early photography in the 1970s in Stockholm included portraits of the stars of Sweden's fashion, theater and dance worlds. His first two photography exhibits were in Stockholm and met with mixed reviews. But as he matured as a photographer and tapped into his fashion world contacts, Arimondi landed a number of commercial fashion jobs, including shooting for the Italian designer Salvatore Ferragamo S.p.A.'s I.Magnin department store ad that ran in Vogue.

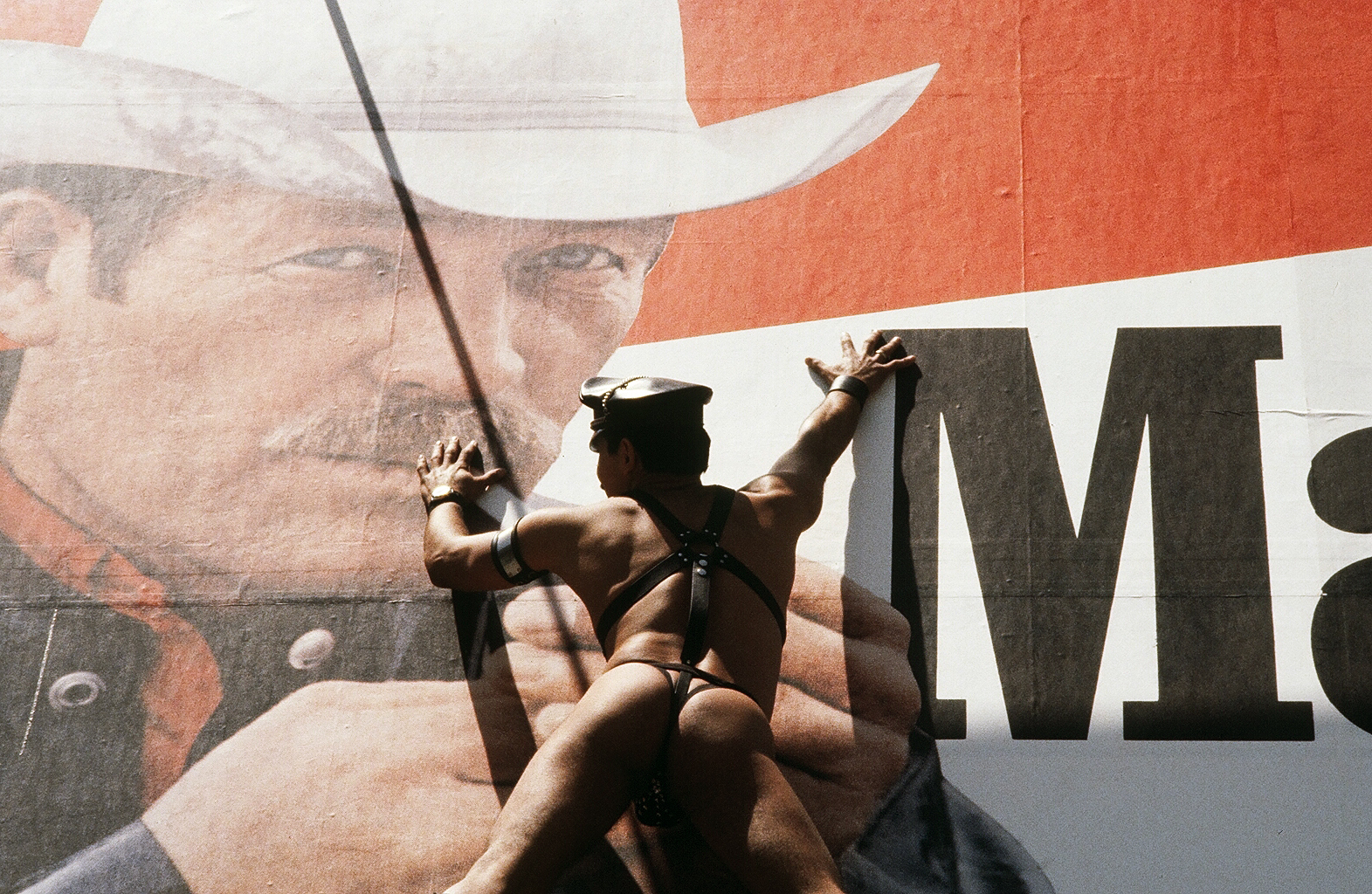
Marlboro Man Nude, New York City,1980.

He also shot other artists and models for his own portfolio, including Grace Jones, the Norwegian actress, Liv Ullmann, and the American writer, Norman Mailer.

Arimondi's aesthetic vision was focused on fantasy and drama, and he prided himself on pushing limits.

Although less well-known than his San Francisco contemporary, photographer Robert Mapplethorpe, whose work was shown alongside Arimondi's in photography exhibits and books, Arimondi, too, was noted for his male nudes. Arimondi's compositions, though, often combined a dream-like affect with the sensual. His distinctive use of light and shadow also distinguished his work from that of other photographers of the time.

Although his male nudes were published in a number of books and magazines around the world, and his photos were shown in galleries from New York to Tokyo, the exposure did not always translate into sustainable profits. Arimondi's work as a fashion model helped pay his bills.

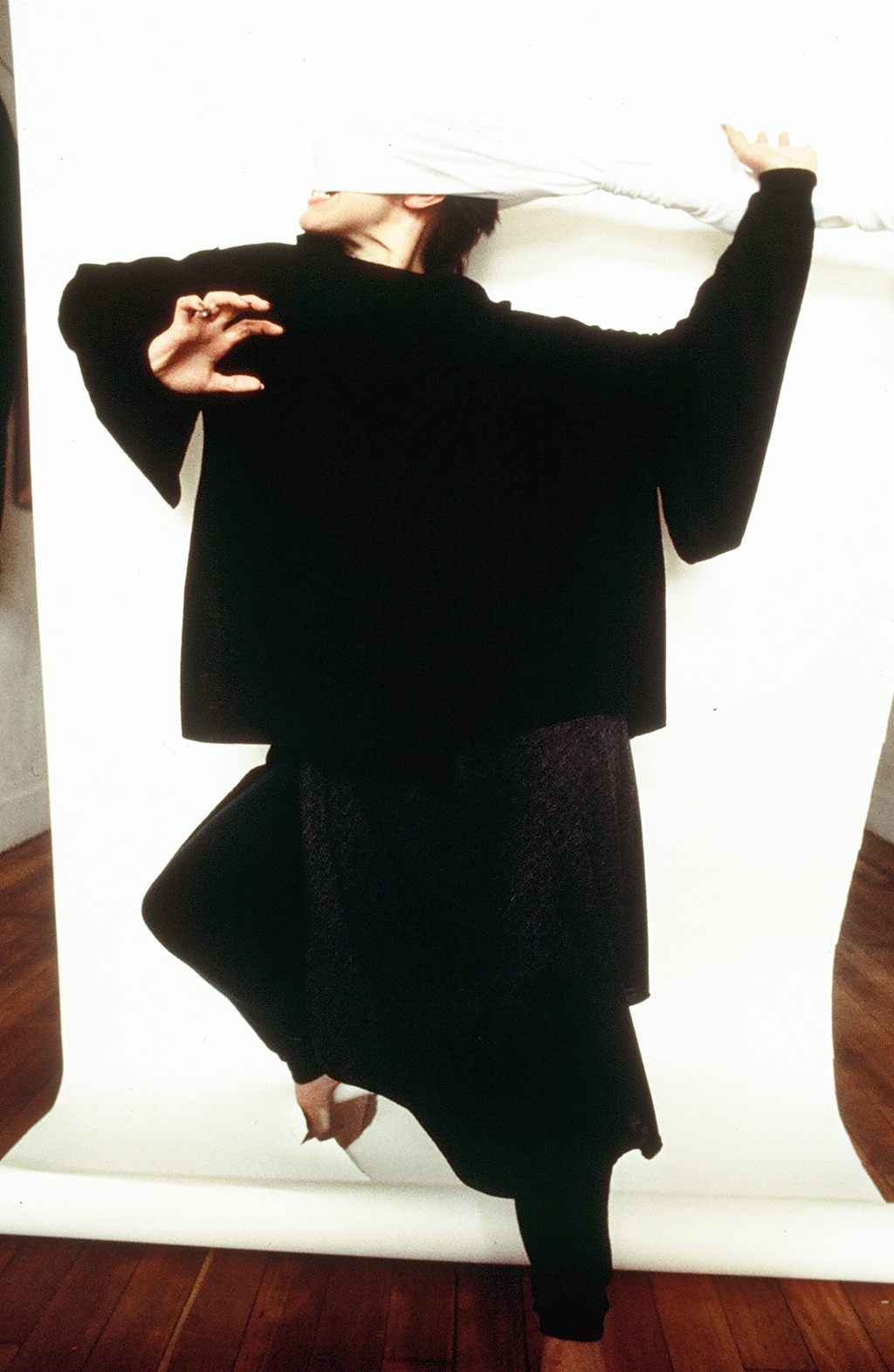
Fashion Photography, San Francisco, 1981.

In his last years Arimondi's photography began to take a turn to social documentary with individual portraits of homeless men and women and images of construction workers on the streets of San Francisco.

Arimondi's circa 1990 photography exhibit in San Francisco, "55 x 1", featured images of evocative still lifes he composed using his early portraits of 55 models who had subsequently died from HIV/AIDS.

In 1992, he donated 30 of his photography works to Sweden's museum of modern art, Moderna Museet, in Stockholm.

His work, often poignant, typically focused on the humanity behind an image, no matter how striking, and was valued for its historic and documentary value, as well as its artistic merit.

From the heady days of his international fashion career and the New York disco scene of the 1970s to the liberated gay culture of San Francisco during that decade to the growing toll of AIDS and homelessness as the 1980s began, Arimondi captured his times with photography others considered ahead of his time.

== Selected works ==
Arimondi, Victor. The Look of Men. London: Colour Library International Ltd., 1980. ISBN 0906558425

Arimondi, Victor. Boyfriends. New York: Arlington House, 1st English edition, 1984. ISBN 9780517554821

Leddick, David. The Male Nude. New York: Taschen, 1st edition, 1998. ISBN 978-3-8228-7966-5; Taschen Bibliotheca Universalis edition, 2015. ISBN 978-3-8365-5801-3

Gale, Patrick. Armistead Maupin. (Cover photo by Arimondi) England, Bath: Absolute Press, Revised Edition, 2000. ISBN 978-1899791378

== Selected Exhibits ==
1999: "From Vogue to Homeless: 20 Years of Photography in the U.S.,” Muddy Waters Cafe gallery, San Francisco

2002: “Arimondi: A Retrospective,” Atelier Studio Gallery, San Francisco.

2004: “Victor Arimondi,” Geras Tousignant Gallery, San Francisco

2009: “A Compassionate Eye: The Work of Victor Arimondi,” James C. Hormel Gay and Lesbian Center at the Main Library, San Francisco.

2010: “Autobiography of the San Francisco Bay Area, Part 2: The Future Lasts Forever,” Group show, SF Camerawork, San Francisco
