= Tub Girls =

- Directed by: Andy Warhol
- Starring: Viva; Abigail Rosen; Taylor Mead; Brigid Polk
- Distributed by: Andy Warhol Films
- Release date: 1967
- Running time: 90 mins.
- Country: United States
- Language: English

Tub Girls is a 1967 underground film by Andy Warhol. The film stars Warhol superstar Viva in a bathtub entertaining a series of visitors. Tub Girls is part of the full-length version of Warhol's film **** (Four Stars) (1967).

== Plot ==
The film follows Viva in different bathtubs as she receives a succession of visitors from Factory regulars. Throughout the film, Viva alternately shares the tub with and departs from different companions, creating a recurring cycle of pairings and separations. The visitors include both men and women of different racial backgrounds, including Abigail Rosen, Brigid Polk, Taylor Mead, and Alexis de la Falaise. The largely improvised encounters emphasize shifting social and interpersonal relationships rather than a conventional narrative.

== Production ==
Viva asked her friend Abigail Rosen to locate an unusual bathtub for a film Warhol had cast her in. Rosen obtained a clear acrylic tub previously used in a television commercial on the condition that she be allowed to appear in the film. She subsequently appeared alongside Viva in the bathtub while the film. Rosen recalled that Paul Morrissey handled the lighting and camera setup while Warhol briefly supervised the filming. She was paid $100 for her appearance, making her one of the few Warhol performers to receive payment.

Tub Girls consists of six reels from, and appeared as a segment within another Warhol film, the 25-hour-long **** (Four Stars) (1967). The original poster promoting the film, designed by George Abagnalo, is shown prominently in a portrait of Warhol by Jack Mitchell.

== Reception ==
In a 1968 article for the East Village Other, critic Dick Preston reviewed **** (Four Stars) and highlighted the Tub Girls segment, writing that it explored "all the variations and deviations" of possible pairings. He added, "Among the sequences which appealed to me was a very white Viva bathing in a glass bath (set in the middle of a black and white chequered floor) with a dark skinned girl of infinite charm and beauty. … Viva making love in the bath (there were at least six different bath sequences) with a young man to whom she hardly said a word."

== See also ==
- List of American films of 1967
- Andy Warhol filmography
