= Couch (film) =

1964 film

- Directed by: Andy Warhol
- Produced by: Andy Warhol
- Starring: Baby Jane Holzer; Gregory Corso; Gerard Malanga; Jack Kerouac; Rufus Collins; Billy Name
- Production company: Andy Warhol Films
- Distributed by: The Factory
- Release date: July 1964
- Running time: 54 min.
- Country: United States
- Language: English

Couch (1964) is a feature-length underground film directed by Andy Warhol, and starring Gerard Malanga, Piero Heliczer, Naomi Levine, Gregory Corso, Allen Ginsberg, John Palmer, Baby Jane Holzer, Ivy Nicholson, Amy Taubin, Ondine, Peter Orlovsky, Jack Kerouac, Taylor Mead, Kate Heliczer, Rufus Collins, Joseph LeSeuer, Binghamton Birdie, Mark Lancaster, Gloria Wood, and Billy Name.

== Plot ==
An "entirely pornographic" series of sexual encounters on the old red couch at The Factory, with all permutations and orientations.

== See also ==
- List of American films of 1964
- Andy Warhol filmography
