= Charles Holzer =

United States Virgin Islands equestrian

Personal information
- Born: June 24, 1969 (age 56) New York, New York, United States

Sport
- Sport: Equestrian

Charles "Rusty" Holzer (born June 24, 1969) is an equestrian who represents the United States Virgin Islands. He competed in the individual jumping event at the 1992 Summer Olympics.
