= Batman Dracula =

1964 film

- Promotional artwork
- Directed by: Andy Warhol
- Produced by: Andy Warhol
- Starring: Naomi Levine; Gerard Malanga; Taylor Mead; Jack Smith; Sam Green
- Release date: July 1964
- Running time: 120 minutes
- Country: United States

Batman Dracula is a 1964 silent 16mm black and white American superhero fan film produced and directed by Andy Warhol without the permission of DC Comics, who owns the character Batman. It stars Jack Smith who plays the roles of both millionaire Bruce Wayne and Count Dracula. The film was screened only at Warhol's Pop Art exhibits and some of it has been lost.

== Production background ==
A fan of the Batman comic series, Warhol made the film as a homage. Warhol devoted roughly seven hours of film stock to it. The film was thought to be lost until scenes from it were shown at some length in the documentary Jack Smith and the Destruction of Atlantis (2006).

== Cast ==
- Tally Brown as Florence, Granddaughter of Old Woman and Old Man
- Beverly Grant as Rose
- Sam Green
- Dorothy Dean as Doris
- Bob Heide
- Baby Jane Holzer as Rebecca, Sister of Sydney and Titus
- Sally Kirkland
- Ron Link
- Naomi Levine as Elizabeth, Daughter of Gaston
- Gerard Malanga
- Mario Montez
- Billy Name
- Taylor Mead
- Ivy Nicholson as Roxanne
- Jack Smith as Batman/Dracula
- Andy Warhol
- Gregory Battcock
- David Bourdon

== Production ==
Batman Dracula was filmed on the beaches of Long Island and on The Factory roof in New York City.

== See also ==
- List of American films of 1964
- Andy Warhol filmography
- Batman Fights Dracula, a 1967 Filipino film
- Batman & Dracula trilogy
