= Mark Titmarsh =

Australian painter

Mark Titmarsh (born 1955) is a contemporary Australian painter. His work involves permutations of painting, sculpture, installation, screen media, performance and writing . In 2017, he published a book called Expanded Painting.

== Work ==
During the early 1980s Titmarsh was a key figure in the underground Super 8 film scene. He produced a number of film projects in Super 8, and in 1982, with Ross Gibson, Lindy Lee, Deirdre Beck and Janet Burchill, formed the Super 8 Collective, who together staged the 3rd Sydney Super 8 Film Festival at the Chauvel Cinema, Paddington, Sydney

Following the 1983 festival, The Sydney Super 8 Film Group, with Titmarsh the sole continuing member from the previous year, was formed and continued to organise and stage festivals, publish film readers and tour programs of film throughout the 1980s.

During this period Titmarsh was . His work as a painter was included in Australian Perspecta 1989 and his film work was shown in Australian Perspecta 1986.

In the 1990s he co-founded the Sydney-based artist's run initiative Art Hotline exhibiting weekly one day exhibitions of ephemeral works in non-gallery everyday sites. He is the editor of an eponymously titled book documenting the 3-year life of the project.

His current practice gathered under the term ‘expanded painting’, involves deconstructing traditional conventions of painting based on canvas, brush, and stretcher and replacing them with other materials including contemporary devices and post-industrial services.

== Exhibitions ==
Titmarsh's exhibition history comprises Australian and international exhibitions. It includes the Pompidou Centre, Paris, France and the Ionion Centre for Art and Culture, Greece. He has held exhibitions at commercial galleries including Roslyn Oxley, Sydney, Bellas Milani Gallery, Brisbane, Australia and Powell Street Gallery, Melbourne.

A monograph about his work, titled, The Thing, was written by Cameron Tonkinwise, and published by Artspace. Sydney, in 2006.

== Collections ==
Titmarsh's works are held in museums and private and corporate collections in Australia, Europe and the United States. These include:

- The National Gallery of Australia, Canberra, Australia
- The Art Gallery of New South Wales, Sydney, Australia
- The National Film and Sound Archive, Canberra, Australia
- National Gallery of Victoria, Australia

== Recognition ==
Titmarsh was awarded the Grace Cossington Art Award in 2016 and The Lake Macquarie Regional Art Prize in 1989.

== Bibliography ==
- Cameron Tonkinwise, “A Sense of Things not Being There: Writing about Mark Titmarsh's “The Thing” in relation to the Thinking of Martin Heidegger”, The Thing, Artist Monograph, Artspace. Sydney, 2006
- Ashley Crawford, Directory of Australian Art, Craftsman House, Fishermans Bend, 2006, ISBN 0975196537
- Andrew Frost, “Intelligent Dolphins: From Metaphysical TV to Remix Culture”, SynCity Catalgoue, dLux Media Arts, Sydney, 2006
- Barrett Hodsdon, Straight Roads and Crossed Lines, The Quest for Film Culture in Australia, Bernt Porridge, Perth, 2001
- Adrian Martin, “Film and Video of the 1980s” in What is Appropriation? Rex Butler (ed.), IMA, Brisbane, 1996, ISBN 1875792120
- Allan McCulloch, The Encyclopedia of Australian Art, 1994
- Max Germaine, "Mark Titmarsh", Dictionary of Australian Galleries and Artists, Volume 2, 1991
- Michael Hutak, "Yes and No - An Interview with Mark Titmarsh", Tension, October 1989
- Adrian Martin, “Indefinite Objects” in Albert Moran and Tom O’Regan (eds.), The Australian Screen, Penguin, Sydney, 1989
- Edward Colless, “Virtually There: Super 8”, Australian Perspecta 1985 Catalogue, Art Gallery of NSW, October 1985
