= Four Stars (1967 film) =

American avant-garde film by Andy Warhol

- Directed by: Andy Warhol
- Production company: Andy Warhol Films
- Distributed by: Film-Makers' Distribution Center
- Release date: 1967
- Running time: 1500 minutes
- Country: United States
- Language: English

Four Stars (also known as ****) is a 1967 avant-garde film by Andy Warhol, consisting of 25 hours of film. In typical Warhol fashion of the period, each reel of the film is 35 minutes long, or 1200 ft. in length, and is shot in sync-sound.

The film's title is a pun on the rating system used by critics to rank films, with "four stars" being the highest rating. Four Stars was split into several films, including Tub Girls (1967), Imitation of Christ (1967), and Loves of Ondine (1968).

== Overview ==
As opposed to Warhol's earlier sound films during this period, such as Vinyl, made in 1965, in which the camera, once turned on, was never stopped until the film ran out in one continuous take, Four Stars uses what critic Gene Youngblood dubbed "strobe cuts", created by turning the camera on and off during shooting, causing several overexposed or "whited-out" frames, to appear in the completed film, and an accompanying burst of sound on the film's soundtrack. However, apart from this "in-camera" editing, no other edits were made in the finished film; each reel, as in all of his films during this period, runs 1200 feet (366 m) in length. Warhol uses these "strobe cuts" as punctuation for the images in the film, which document Factory life during this period, and feature a cast of Warhol "superstars" including Edie Sedgwick, Susan Bottomly, Ondine, Brigid Berlin, Viva, Nico, Mary Woronov, Gerard Malanga, Allen Midgette, Ultra Violet, Ingrid Superstar, Ruby Lynn Reyner, Taylor Mead, Joe Dallesandro, and others.

Photographed entirely in color, Four Stars was projected in its complete length of nearly 25 hours (allowing for projection overlap of the 35-minute reels) only once, on December 15–16, 1967, at the New Cinema Playhouse at 120 West 42nd Street, the Film-Makers' Cinematheque's space in the now-demolished Wurlitzer Building, renamed and with its entrance moved from 125 West 41st Street in New York City. The imagery in the film is dense, wearying and beautiful, but ultimately hard to decipher, for, in contrast to his earlier, and more famous film Chelsea Girls, made in 1966, Warhol had the reels projected superimposed on a single screen, rather than side-by-side. The New York Times described "three-on-one imagery", with three images superimposed along with several soundtracks.

This created two levels of imagery for the entire running time of the film, along with two levels of sound to contend with at the same time. Warhol attended the screening for the entire length of the film, and later remarked that he knew that "this was the last time we would be making films for ourselves."

Shortly thereafter, Warhol turned his hand to more commercial efforts, and after the attempted assassination by Valerie Solanas at the second studio at 33 Union Square West, Paul Morrissey effectively took over the production of films under the Warhol banner.

After the one marathon screening of Four Stars, a two-hour excerpt from the film was shown for several weeks afterward under the same title at the Cinematheque, although it had little of the impact of the original film. Subsequently, the film was broken down into many shorter works, such as Imitation of Christ (1967), Tub Girls (1967) and Loves of Ondine (1968).

== See also ==
- List of American films of 1967
- Andy Warhol filmography
- List of longest films by running time
