= Horse (1965 film) =

- Directed by: Andy Warhol
- Written by: Ronald Tavel
- Produced by: Andy Warhol
- Starring: Edie Sedgwick; Ondine; Gregory Battcock; Tosh Carillo; Norman Glick
- Production company: Andy Warhol Films
- Distributed by: The Factory
- Release date: March 1965
- Running time: 105 minutes 70 minutes (cut version)
- Country: United States
- Language: English

Horse is a 1965 American underground film directed by Andy Warhol, written by Ronald Tavel, and starring Edie Sedgwick, Gregory Battcock, Tosh Carillo, Ondine, Norman Glick, Daniel Cassidy Jr., and Larry Latrae (Latreille). Warhol makes a cameo.

== Plot ==
The main event is a strip poker game played by an outlaw, his sheriff captor, and a friend. The game ends with the outlaw (Tosh Carrillo) getting beaten up by the others for cheating. At one point, one of the men sits on the real horse (a stallion) hired for the day by Warhol.

== See also ==
- List of American films of 1965
- Andy Warhol filmography
