= Brigid Berlin =

American painter (1939–2020)

- Brigid Berlin in 1967
- Born: September 6, 1939; New York City, U.S.
- Died: July 17, 2020 (aged 80); New York City, U.S.
- Occupation: Painter
- Spouse: John Parker (m. 1960, divorced)
- Parent(s): Richard E. Berlin; Muriel Johnson

Brigid Emmett Berlin (September 6, 1939 – July 17, 2020), also known as Brigid Polk, was an American artist and Warhol superstar.

== Life and career ==
=== Early years ===
Berlin was born on September 6, 1939, in Manhattan in New York City. She was the eldest of three daughters born to socialite parents, Muriel (Johnson) "Honey" Berlin and Richard E. Berlin. Her father was chairman of the Hearst media empire for 32 years.

As a child, Berlin regularly mixed with celebrities and the powerful:

I would pick up the phone and it would be Richard Nixon. My parents entertained Lyndon Johnson, J. Edgar Hoover, and there were lots of Hollywood people because of San Simeon – Clark Gable, Joan Crawford, Dorothy Kilgallen... I have a box of letters, written to my parents in the late 1940s and 1950s from the Duke and Duchess of Windsor.

Her socialite mother frequently worried about Brigid's weight and constantly attempted to get her to lose it through any means, from giving her cash for every pound she lost at age 11 to having the family doctor prescribe amphetamines and dexedrine. Berlin recalled, "My mother wanted me to be a slim, respectable socialite. Instead, I became an overweight troublemaker."

She was briefly married to John Parker, a window dresser. They married in 1960 and later divorced. As Andy Warhol observed in his book Popism: "When Brigid brought her window dresser fiancé home to meet the family, her mother told the doorman to tell him to wait on a bench across the street in Central Park. Then she handed Brigid her wedding present – a hundred dollar bill – and told her to go to Bergdorf's and buy herself some new underwear with it. Then she added, 'Good luck with that fairy.'"

She had three siblings, all younger: sister Richie, who was, for a time, the roommate of Warhol Films' "It Girl" and superstar Edie Sedgwick; youngest sister Christina "Chrissy" Berlin, who was instrumental in engineering the defection of Russian ballet star Mikhail Baryshnikov; and the youngest sibling, brother Richard Berlin Jr.

=== Association with Andy Warhol ===
After several years as a reluctant debutante and a failed marriage, Brigid Berlin met Andy Warhol in 1964 and quickly became a central member of his entourage. After moving to Hotel Chelsea, she took on the nickname Brigid Polk because of her habit of giving out 'pokes', injections of Vitamin B and amphetamines. These injections were readily available through the many 'Doctor Feelgoods' in New York and perfectly legal.

Berlin appeared in several of Warhol's films, including Chelsea Girls (1966), in which she is seen injecting herself while performing a monologue, and Ciao! Manhattan (1972), which starred Edie Sedgwick.

She was known for her obsessive taping and photographing of everyday life. Selections from these tapes were later compiled by Anthony Ingrassia to form the play Andy Warhol's Pork. Other tapes made by her were the basis for Live at Max's Kansas City (recorded 1970, released 1972), The Velvet Underground's first live album.

Berlin was complicit in one of Warhol's more infamous pranks when, in 1969, Warhol announced that all of his paintings were the work of Berlin. Brigid enthusiastically followed this line when interviewed by Time. The prank led to a drop in the value of Warhol's work, and both parties eventually retracted their statements. The question of authorship looms large in valuing Warhol's paintings to this day.

In 1975, Berlin began work as a permanent employee for Andy Warhol's Interview magazine, a position that she held until well after Warhol's death. Berlin transcribed interviews as well as knitted under the desk. Patricia Hearst (a close friend of Berlin who began work at Interview in 1988) observed "On my first day at work, I noticed two small pugs who seemed to have the run of the castle. They belonged to a woman who sat behind the front desk every day from 9:00 to 5:00, but who never seemed to answer the phone. Instead, she compulsively knitted, ate bags of candy and tended lovingly to the dogs."

=== Later years ===
Berlin appeared in minor parts in two John Waters' films: Serial Mom (1994) and Pecker (1998).

Pie in the Sky: The Brigid Berlin Story (2000) is a documentary in which she tells her life story in intimate detail and breaks her diet by consuming an entire meal of key lime pies. In its review, Variety suggests "Berlin comes across as a rather sad character despite her colorful and provocative life."

== Death ==
After experiencing health issues for several years that mainly kept her confined to her bed, Berlin died by the side of her longtime companion, multimedia producer Rob Vaczy, at the age of 80 on July 17, 2020, in a Manhattan hospital.

== Works ==
=== Paintings ===
Although Berlin did not consider herself an artist, it has been argued by some that her artwork was both influential to Andy Warhol's and simultaneously overshadowed by Warhol's celebrity and output. Berlin's "Tit Prints" were artworks created using her bare breasts. Berlin would dip her breasts into multiple colored paints and then create a print by pressing them down onto canvas/paper. The Tit Prints are arguably Berlin's most infamous work and were exhibited by Jane Stubbs at a gallery on Madison Avenue in 1996. On occasion, Berlin would publicly create Tit Prints, integrating visual art and performance art that "is totally not about nudity, this is about, you know, art." She performed this act live at the Gramercy International Art Fair. After experiencing the performance, filmmaker John Waters later said "I think that she's the most unselfconscious nude person...[She has] great confidence for a fat girl."

Berlin also compiled and maintained scrapbooks that she referred to as "trip books." Volumes of these scrapbooks collecting cartoons and sketches of male genitalia were known as "The Cock Book" and included the genitalia of artists such as Jasper Johns, Robert Rauschenberg, and Warhol. Three volumes of "The Cock Book" sold for $175,000 at auction to artist Richard Prince.

=== Photography ===
Both Berlin and Warhol used the medium of Polaroid photography obsessively, and are said to have been very competitive in the Polaroid film department, whether over the best equipment or the best film. In 1969–1970 German art dealer Heiner Friedrich did a small showing of Berlin's work called Polaroids and Tapes and created a catalogue for the work of the same name. The experimental nature of Berlin's double-exposed Polaroids transcend the static, emotionless "icon" Polaroids of Warhol's, clearly showing the power of her personal vision and photographic style. Common subject matter of Berlin's Polaroids are self-portraits, Warhol Superstars, other artists and celebrities, and Off-Broadway one-woman shows. A one-woman show of her Polaroid self-portraits titled "It's All About Me" showed in 2015 at the Invisible-Exports Gallery in New York City. The New York Times review stated "Ms. Berlin's prints seem less of a lark and more like a strident, celebratory statement by an artist who was never shy about exposing...well, anything."

Berlin's digitized archives were published in 2015 as Brigid Berlin Polaroids with a foreword by John Waters. A review of the book in the Wall Street Journal notes that Berlin was also the first person Andy Warhol allowed to photograph his body after the 1968 assassination attempt.

== Filmography ==
- Chelsea Girls (1966)
- Tub Girls (1967)
- Bike Boy (1967)
- The Nude Restaurant (1967)
- Imitation of Christ (1967)
- Four Stars**** (1967) aka 24 Hour Movie
- Lonesome Cowboys (1967) (originally Berlin was to play a leader of a rival gang of cowboys)
- The Loves of Ondine (1967)
- Women in Revolt (1971)
- Ciao! Manhattan (1972)
- Phoney (1973)
- Fight (1975)
- Andy Warhol's Bad (1977)
- The Critical Years (1987)
- Serial Mom (1994)
- Pecker (1998)
- Pie in the Sky: The Brigid Berlin Story (1999)
- Danny Williams and the Dream Factory (documentary, 2007)
