= Rick Péwé =

American writer, photographer, and broadcast host (born 1956)

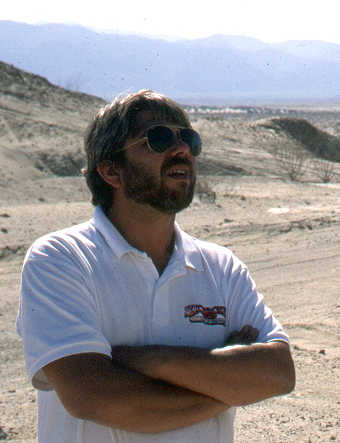
Rick Péwé, California desert, 1999.

Rick Péwé (born Richard Hill Péwé; July 22, 1956, Fairbanks, Alaska) is an American writer, editor, photographer, and broadcast host. He was inducted into the Off-road Motorsports Hall of Fame (ORMHOF) in 2010. Other notable ORMHOF inductees include Steve McQueen, James Garner, Parnelli Jones, Mickey Thompson, Rod Hall, Ivan Stewart, Bob "Bigfoot" Chandler, Malcolm Smith and Walker Evans.

In 1971, Péwé purchased his first Jeep, a 1945 Ford GPW at age 15. He eventually re-powered this military Jeep with a 455 cubic-inch Buick V-8 engine. In 1984, Péwé acquired Tempe, Arizona-based Republic Off-Road after completing his B.S. in geography from Arizona State University. Republic Off-Road employees and associates—most notably Shanon Campbell—became top competitors at early rock-crawling/tough-truck challenges. Péwé finished second in his first competition, the 1993 Four Wheeler Top Truck Challenge. He also served as a technical consultant for Four Wheeler and other off-road enthusiast magazines.

As a driver/navigator, Péwé competed in SCORE desert races in the 1980s in the Flamingo Racing CJ-7. He was on Rod Hall's Hummer team for the Baja 1000 from 2006 to 2008.

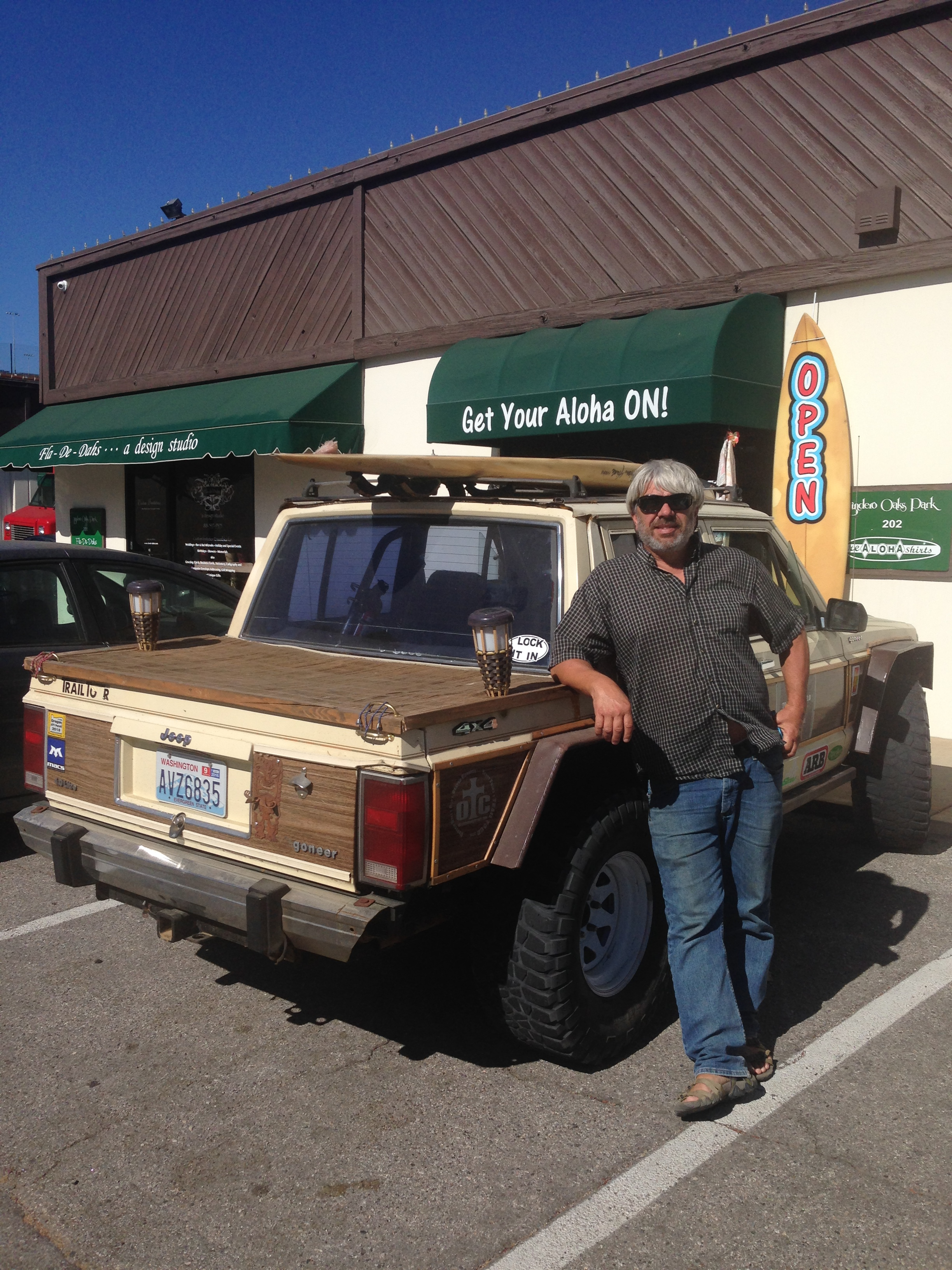
Rick Péwé's Tiki Jeep

In 1995, Péwé accepted a position as Technical Editor of Petersen's 4-Wheel & Off-Road Magazine, where he later served as editor-in-chief. He became Editor of the all-Jeep magazine Jp in 1998.

There, Péwé launched an annual “Dirt Every Day” trip where he and magazine editor David Freiburger located an abandoned Jeep somewhere in the country and attempted to drive it back to California on as many unpaved roads as possible. This series spawned the popular Motor Trend Channel shows “Roadkill,” co-hosted by Freiburger, and “Dirt Every Day,” co-hosted by former 4-Wheel & Off-Road staffer Fred Williams, whom Péwé initially hired to be a technical writer. Rick Péwé makes occasional guest appearances on both of these shows. He is also known to drive his own Jeeps across North America.

Péwé served as editor-in-chief of Petersen's 4-Wheel & Off-Road from 2000 to 2014 and editorial director of The Enthusiast Network's (née Petersen Publishing Company's)/Motor Trend Group's Four Wheeler Network before returning to his former position at Jp.

After Motor Trend Group discontinued the majority of its magazines, Péwé co-founded the Jeep-enthusiast digital outlet Gone-Gpn, where he's Editor-In-Chief. He also wrote a book on rebuilding and modifying classic Jeep engines and serves as an ambassador for several off-road brands. Péwé is also a frequent guest on Jeep- and outdoors-related shows and automotive sites.

The Jeep Wrangler JL features a flip-flop "Easter egg" on the windshield cowling in honor of Rick's penchant for wearing that type of footwear.
