= Dave Ekins =

American motorcycle racer

David Lawrence Ekins (born May 20, 1932) is an American off-road motorcycle racer who pioneered the sport of desert racing in the 1950s. He was inducted into the AMA Motorcycle Hall of Fame in 2001.

== Motorcycle racing career ==
Born in Los Angeles, California, Ekins followed his brother and fellow Motorcycle Hall of Fame member, Bud Ekins, into motorcycle racing. He and his brother honed their riding skills by riding the dirt trails in the hills above their Hollywood, California home. Ekins' riding skill earned him sponsored racing motorcycles from factories such as; Velocette, Zundapp, Honda, Harley-Davidson and Bultaco.

Ekins became one of the first American riders to use Honda motorcycles in desert races, helping usher in the era of lightweight, smaller-displacement off-road motorcycles. In the late 1950s, most desert racers preferred heavy, ungainly, British parallel twin cylinder motorcycles. He competed in many of the most prestigious West Coast off-road races aboard motorcycles as small as 100ccs in displacement, often finishing ahead of competitors on larger motorcycles, including an overall victory at the 1967 Greenhorn Enduro aboard a 100cc Zundapp.

In 1962, Ekins and Bill Robertson rode a Honda CL72 motorcycle almost the entire length of Mexico's Baja California Peninsula in less than 40 hours to set the Tijuana-to-La Paz, Mexico record. Their speed record provided a challenge for other off-road competitors with both, motorcycles and four wheeled vehicles. One of these challengers to Ekins' record run was Ed Pearlman, who decided to organize a yearly off-road race that became known as the Baja 1000.

In 1964, Ekins along with his brother, Bud, Steve McQueen and Cliff Coleman were members of the first American team to compete in the International Six Days Trial. The International Six Day Trials, a form of off-road motorcycle Olympics, is the oldest annual competition sanctioned by the FIM dating back to 1913. Ekins competed in five ISDT events and earned two gold medals and a bronze medal in the prestigious motorcycle competition.

Ekins founded and launched the Sunline brand of motorcycle parts and accessories.
