= Bud Ekins =

American motorcycle stunt performer

- Born: May 11, 1930; Hollywood, California
- Died: October 6, 2007 (aged 77); Los Angeles, California
- Occupations: Motorcycle Racer, Motorcycle Dealer, Movie and TV Stuntman
- Spouse: Betty Gene Towne (1929-1996)
- Parents: Clyde Sherwin Ekins (father); Marguerite Weatherwax (mother)

James Sherwin "Bud" Ekins (May 11, 1930 – October 6, 2007) was an American professional stuntman in the U.S. film industry. He is considered to be one of the film industry's most accomplished stuntmen with a body of work that includes classic films such as The Great Escape and Bullitt. Ekins, acting as stunt double for Steve McQueen while filming The Great Escape, was the rider who performed what is considered to be one of the most famous motorcycle stunts ever performed in a movie. He was recognized for his stunt work by being inducted into the Stuntmen's Hall of Fame.

Ekins was also an accomplished off-road motorcycle racer in motocross and enduro events, and helped pioneer the sport of desert racing. He was inducted into the Off-road Motorsports Hall of Fame in 1980, the AMA Motorcycle Hall of Fame in 1999 and, the Motorsports Hall of Fame of America in 2024.

== Motorcycle racing career ==
Born in Hollywood, California, Ekins began riding off-road motorcycles daily in the hills above his Hollywood home. As a result of his diligence, he developed into a highly talented motorcyclist and started entering local off-road races in 1949. By the mid-1950s, Ekins was the top motocross and desert racer in Southern California, winning the AMA District 37 championship seven times.

Ekins' successful race results led the Matchless motorcycle factory to offer him the opportunity to compete in the 1952 European Motocross Championship against the best motocross racers in the world. Despite riding on muddy circuits that were much rougher than he was accustomed to, he managed to earn his senior license and turned in some respectable results to finish the season in ranked 15th in the world.

In 1955, Ekins won the Catalina Grand Prix, and in 1959 became the third three-time winner of the prestigious Big Bear Hare & Hound desert race, which at the time was the largest off-road event in the country. Ekins' 1959 Big Bear victory was made notable when his motorcycle suffered a flat tire and a broken wheel while he was leading the race at the halfway point of the 153-mile course. After his race team repaired the tire and wheel, Ekins rejoined the race and recaptured the lead to win the race 30 minutes ahead of his nearest competitor. By the mid-1960s, Ekins owned a Triumph motorcycle dealership in Sherman Oaks, CA, near Hollywood, which became a popular destination for many young film actors including Steve McQueen, Paul Newman and Clint Eastwood. Ekins helped McQueen learn off-road racing and the actor became an accomplished motorcycle racer.

Ekins also represented the United States at the International Six Days Trial, a form of off-road motorcycle Olympics which, is the oldest annual competition sanctioned by the FIM dating back to 1913. It was as an enduro competitor that Ekins achieved his greatest international racing success. He received a gold medal at the 1962 International Six Days Trials in East Germany, and was part of the 1964 U.S. ISDT team with his brother, Dave Ekins, John Steen, Cliff Coleman and McQueen. He rode a 650cc Triumph TR6 Trophy alongside teammate Steve McQueen in the 1964 International Six Days Trial. In 1965, again on Triumphs, the team competed at the ISDT on the Isle of Man. Ekins won four gold medals and a silver during his seven years of competing in the ISDT during the 1960s.

Ekins helped pioneer the sport of desert racing in 1962 when his brother Dave Ekins and Bill Robertson Jr. rode motorcycles almost the entire length of Mexico's Baja California Peninsula in 39 hours and 48 minutes under grueling conditions to set the Tijuana-to-La Paz, Mexico record. Their speed record provided a challenge for other off-road competitors with both, motorcycles and four wheeled vehicles. One of these challengers to Ekins' record run was Ed Pearlman, who decided to organize a yearly off-road race that became known as the Baja 1000.

Ekins participated in many of the early off-road racing events including the Mint 400 and the Stardust 7-11 in Las Vegas, Nevada. In addition to racing motorcycles, Ekins raced four wheeled off-road vehicles. He raced alongside Steve McQueen in the inaugural Baja 500 in 1969 and subsequently won overall. He worked with fellow Off-Road Hall of Fame Inductee, Vic Hickey for five years, helping him to build the Baja Boot racer. He drove three races for Steve McQueen and Drino Miller, another Off-Road Hall of Fame Inductee.

== Film industry career ==
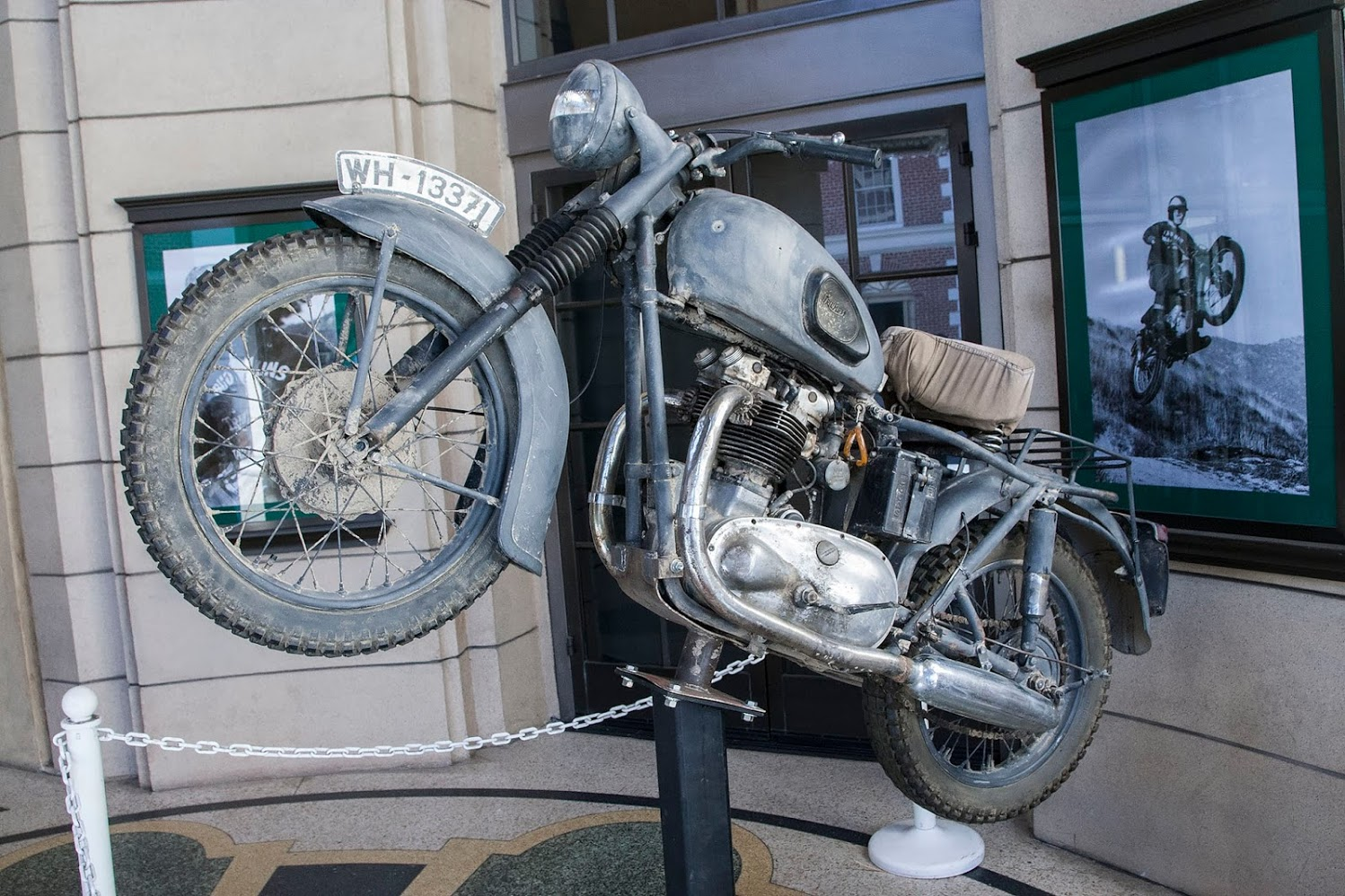
Replica of motorcycle used by Ekins for stunts in the film The Great Escape.

Through his association with McQueen, Ekins began a career as a film stuntman. Ekins is best known as the actor who jumped the fence on a motorcycle in the 1963 film The Great Escape, and one of the stuntmen who drove the Ford Mustang 390 GT in the car chase scene in the 1968 film Bullitt. The chase scene led by stunt coordinator Carey Loftin and filmed on the streets of San Francisco, is regarded as one of the most influential in film history.

Ekins also coordinated the stunts for the popular 1970s motorcycle cop show CHiPs. He eventually became one of the best stuntmen in Hollywood. He continued doing stunt work until he was in his mid-60s, his stunt career spanned 30 years. Throughout the 1990s Ekins was on screen in movies and TV as a character actor, and can be seen in films such as Pacific Heights, Mac and Me, The Karate Kid series, The Specialist (1994), and Vegas Vacation (1997).

== Later life ==
After retiring from the film industry, Ekins continued to operate his motorcycle shop in Sherman Oaks which featured his impressive collection of vintage motorcycles. During the 1980s, Ekins became one of the top collectors of vintage motorcycles in the country. Ekins was inducted into the Off-road Motorsports Hall of Fame in 1980 and into the Motorcycle Hall of Fame in 2009. Ekins died at the age of 77 on October 6, 2007, in Los Angeles, California.

== Filmography and television stunt work ==
- The Great Escape (1963)
- The Cincinnati Kid (1965)
- Angels from Hell (1968)
- Speedway (1968)
- Bullitt (1968)
- Then Came Bronson (1969 film entitled "And Then Came Bronson" and 1969-70 TV Series)
- Flap (1970)
- Chrome and Hot Leather (1971)
- Diamonds Are Forever (1971)
- The Thing with Two Heads (1972)
- Electra Glide in Blue (1973)
- Earthquake (1974) (motorcycle stunts)
- The Towering Inferno (1974)
- The Front Page (1974)
- Race with the Devil (1975)
- Death Scream (1975)
- Dixie Dynamite (1976) - film also features McQueen in an uncredited stunt role
- Scorchy (1976)
- Sorcerer (1977)
- Return from Witch Mountain (1978)
- Animal House (1978)
- Movie Movie (1978)
- Fast Charlie... the Moonbeam Rider (1979)
- 1941 (1979)
- The Blues Brothers (1980)
- Megaforce (1982)
- Jekyll and Hyde... Together Again (1982)
- City Heat (1984)
- Black Moon Rising (1986)
- Extreme Justice (1993)
- The Ransom of Red Chief (1998)
