= Motor Trend =

American automobile magazine

- Cover of the 75th anniversary issue (Summer 2024)
- Editor-in-Chief: Edward Loh
- Categories: Automobile magazine
- Frequency: Monthly (print, 1949–2024); Quarterly (print, 2024–present); Monthly (digital)
- Total circulation: 553,838 (June 2022)
- Founder: Robert E. Petersen
- First issue: September 1949; 76 years ago
- Company: Motor Trend Group (Hearst Communications)
- Country: United States
- Based in: El Segundo, California, U.S.
- Language: English
- Website: motortrend.com
- ISSN: 0027-2094

Motor Trend is an American automobile magazine. It first appeared in September 1949, and designated the first Car of the Year, also in 1949. Motor Trend bears the tagline "The Magazine for a Motoring World".

Petersen Publishing Company in Los Angeles published Motor Trend until 1998, when it was sold to British publisher EMAP, who then sold the former Petersen magazines to Primedia Inc. in 2001. In December 2024, Hearst Communications acquired Motor Trend Group and most its assets including Motor Trend from Warner Bros. Discovery.

Publication was monthly but changed to quarterly in 2024.

== Contents and sections ==
The contents of Motor Trend magazines are divided up into sections, or departments.

=== Road tests ===
Motor Trend magazine provides its readers with written "road tests" of vehicles. These road tests are published in each issue and are meant to give readers information about the featured vehicle, certain aspects of the vehicle, and what the readers can expect if the featured vehicle is purchased.

=== Vehicle comparisons ===
There are two main types of Motor Trend vehicle comparisons. Regular comparisons usually compare two to three vehicles, looking at what each is like to own, drive, etc. On Motor Trend's YouTube channel (titled "MotorTrend Channel"), Motor Trend puts up their best comparison of the month on a series called "Head 2 Head," featuring MotorTrend editors comparing cars on YouTube.

"Big Test" comparisons typically feature anywhere from five to seven vehicles, all being compared against each other. In a way, a vehicle comparison is like a large road test featuring many vehicles, rather than just one.

=== The Trend ===
The Trend provides readers with the latest what's happening in the automotive industry. This section may feature news about manufacturers, recalls, etc. "Newcomers" (recently redesigned or all-new models), along with short informative articles about them, can also be found in this section.

=== MotorTrend Garage ===
Motor Trend keeps a fleet of long-term test cars at their headquarters in Los Angeles, California. The majority of the Motor Trend editors are each assigned a car, and their duty is to drive that car on a daily basis and report on what's happening. Each month, one to two new vehicles are added to the fleet, to replace the one to two vehicles leaving the fleet. Each long-term test lasts approximately one calendar year. Not every vehicle receives a printed update each month, though the vehicles are still there. This section is typically located towards the end of the magazine.

=== Other features ===
Other types of articles are sometimes featured in the Motor Trend magazine. There is typically one special feature per month. For example, in one issue of the magazine, there may be a special feature about Motor Trend's "Real MPG" testing. For these tests, Motor Trend measures the "real-world" fuel economy of a vehicle in a number of conditions, and then compares their results to the EPA estimated fuel economy that manufacturers provide dealerships, who then provide it to their customers.

== Motor Trend Car of the Year ==
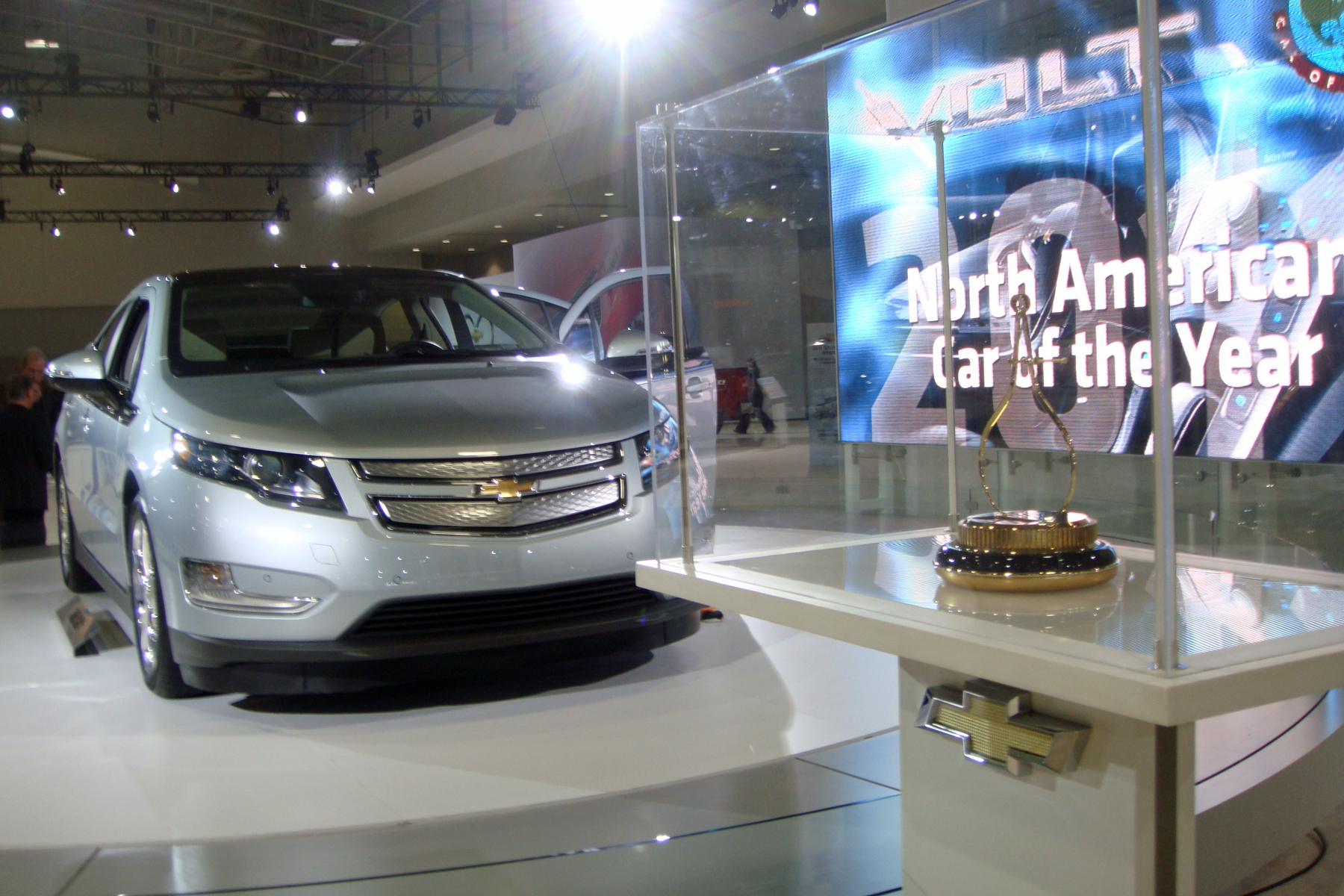
The Chevrolet Volt won the COTY award in 2011.

One of the earliest and most enduring of the magazine's creations was its Car of the Year award, given almost continuously since 1949, although the phrase itself would not become entrenched until well into the 1950s. It predates the European Car of the Year award begun in 1964.

The first winner was the 1949 Cadillac, which featured an innovative overhead valve V8 engine; while the company initially turned down the award from the brand new magazine, it now proudly references its COTY wins in publicity materials. The award has gone through several splits and permutations over the years, being called the Golden Wheels Award for a while in the 1970s and having given rise to Truck of the Year and Import Car of the Year, as well as SUV of the Year. Nevertheless, it is still coveted by manufacturers and is usually covered by the mainstream press as the most important distinction awarded in the American auto industry.

== New car guides ==
The magazine releases a special edition every September and October listing the latest new vehicles. The September issue looks at the latest cars (sedans, coupes, etc.) for the next coming calendar year, whilst in October the magazine looks at off-roaders, MPVs and sport-utility vehicles (SUVs).

== Offshoots ==
=== Truck Trend ===
Truck Trend magazine presented features and the latest news about the truck, SUV, and crossover segments. Additionally, the Readers' Rides section allowed readers to post images and information about their own vehicles. Truck Trend began in 1995 as "Truck Trends," a section of Motor Trend itself. It became the stand-alone publication Truck Trend in 1997. Truck Trend magazine ceased production in December 2019, as one of the nineteen magazines that Motor Trend Group ceased publication during that month.

=== Motor Trend Classic ===
Motor Trend Classic included articles about significant classic cars from around the world made during the last 60 years. A total of 23 issues were produced. The first run was eight issues: two undated issues in 2005, and six additional bimonthly issues in 2006. Several years later the title was relaunched, and that second run was fifteen issues: quarterly from Spring 2010 through Spring 2013, then a combined Spring/Fall 2013 issue, with the final Summer 2014 issue appearing a year later.

=== Motor Trend On Demand ===
Motor Trend On Demand is an online television service. It features television series from Motor Trend, Automobile Magazine, Hot Rod, Super Street and Four Wheeler, such as Roadkill. In 2015, TEN bought Torque.TV and integrated it into the service, adding coverage of motorsports competitions such as Blancpain GT Series, Pirelli World Challenge, Deutsche Tourenwagen Masters, V8 Supercars, British Touring Car Championship, TCR International Series, FIA European Formula 3 Championship, European Le Mans Series, Australasian Safari, Motoamerica, Endurance FIM World Championship, Motocross World Championship, AMA EnduroCross Championship, and FIM SuperEnduro World Championship.

=== Motor Trend Network ===
In April 2018, following the acquisition of a majority stake in TEN by Discovery Communications, it was announced that its U.S. cable channel Velocity would rebrand as Motor Trend Network later in the year.

==== Italy ====
In Italy, the channel Motor Trend began broadcasting on April 29, 2018, at 6:00 am with the Car Crash TV in place of Focus, whose brand has meanwhile passed into the hands of Mediaset.

== Used car warranty ==
In 2009, Motor Trend introduced a certified used car program, beginning with dealers in Atlanta, Georgia; and Cincinnati, Ohio. As explained in their press release, the program is powered by EasyCare.
