= Dick Cepek =

Richard Cepek (November 28, 1930 – March 1, 1983) was an American off-road motorsports hall of fame member. He is known for starting a 4x4 offroad tire and parts supplier in 1963. Dick Cepek Tires was one of the first off-road enterprises.

== Early life ==
Cepek was born on November 28, 1930, in Hillsboro, Wisconsin. Afterwards, his family moved to Columbus, Ohio, where his father worked in the maintenance department at a trucking company. Cepek served in the United States Navy in the 1950s. He married Dorothy Mudd in 1954 while he was working for Westinghouse Electric.

== Career ==
Soon after marriage he was transferred to South Gate, California. In 1958 he purchased a Land Rover, which he used to explore the California desert. He began riding on group excursions into the desert. While on these excursions, he saw the need for wider, more durable tires for off-roading. He had Armstrong Rubber build him wider tires for his Land Cruiser. Soon other group members wanted wider tires for their vehicles too. He saw the need for the larger off-roading community to purchase tires, so he had Armstrong Rubber build enough tires to fill his one and a half car garage. He took out an advertisement in Sunset magazine. In 1960 he took his wife Dorothy to a for sale barber shop in South Gate. He asked the owner if she would mind if he would rent the space for his tire business. She agreed, and he moved in. He quickly outgrew the space. After being in business for two years, he was able to quit at Westinghouse to dedicate himself full-time to the tire business. He moved the business to an old fire hall down the street. He began selling other off-roading equipment, from shock absorbers and suspensions to camping gear. The business grew to three warehouses and 15 stores, plus a catalog business.

== Influence ==
Cepek was influential in the growth of organized off-road racing. In 1966 he joined Ed Pearlman and two other teams to set a new record time for a four-wheeled vehicle to cross the Baja California peninsula. Pearlman and Cepek crossed the desert in 56 hours, second place behind Claude Dozier and Ed Orr's 41 hours and 45 minutes. Drino Miller and John Lawlor completed the trek in 66 hours. During the crossing, Pearlman and Cepek discussed creating an organization. After the race, Pearlman held a meeting at his house, and created the National Off-Road Racing Association (NORRA). NORRA organized the original Baja 1000 races. Cepek competed in the first three races. He was inducted in the Off-Road Motorsports Hall of Fame in 1978. He also sponsored racers, including fellow Off-road Motorsports Hall of Fame inductees Larry Minor, Rod Hall and Drino Miller.

== Death ==
Cepek died on March 1, 1983, in South Gate, California. Until 2000, Cepek Tires was run by his son Tom Cepek when it was sold to Mickey Thompson Performance Tires.
