= Roadkill (web series) =

- Genre: Car restoration, Documentary, Adventure-comedy
- Created by: MotorTrend Productions
- Developed by: MotorTrend Group
- Starring: Mike Finnegan, David Freiburger
- Country of origin: United States
- No. of seasons: 13
- No. of episodes: 167

Production
- Production location: Southern California

Original release
- Network: Motor Trend on Demand, Discovery+, MAX, YouTube
- Release: February 17, 2012

Related
- Roadkill Q and A, Roadkill Extra, Roadkill Garage

Roadkill is an automotive-themed internet show produced by the MotorTrend Group. It was hosted by former Hot Rod Magazine editor David Freiburger and former technical staff editor Mike Finnegan. Roadkill was primarily filmed in Southern California, with other episodes taking place across the United States, Canada and Australia.

Roadkill aired on YouTube from 2012 until March 2018, when the program moved exclusively to MotorTrend On Demand. It is currently available on Discovery+.

In 2015, the show was sponsored by the American automaker Dodge.

In August 2015 it was announced that TEN: The Enthusiast Network would be publishing a quarterly magazine titled Roadkill Magazine. On 12 January 2018, Mike Finnegan announced on The Kibbe and Finnegan Show that Roadkill Magazine had ceased publishing.

In November 2024 it was announced that due to the closure of MotorTrend Productions, "Roadkill" and its spinoff shows would not be renewed for additional seasons.

== Cast ==
=== Main ===
- David Freiburger: has spent the vast majority of his career working for the various brands now owned by Motor Trend Group.
- Mike Finnegan: employed by Motor Trend Group since 2009. He was also a staff editor at Hot Rod magazine.

=== Featured ===
- Lucky Costa: co-host of Hot Rod Garage. He appeared previously on the Chip Foose show Overhaulin'. Lucky is called in when a vehicle needs extra help.
- Tony Angelo: former co-host of Hot Rod Garage. Tony is an accomplished mechanic and former racer. Tony departed the Motor Trend group in March 2022.
- Steve Dulcich: a mechanic. Steve's farm serves as the backdrop for Roadkill Garage.
- Mike Cotten and David Newbern: friends of Finnegan, hosts of "Faster with Newbern and Cotten," and also featured on "Finnegan's Garage."
- Steve Magnante: an automotive historian and host of "Roadkill's Junkyard Gold."
- Steve Brulé: co-host of Engine Masters.
- Rick Péwé: a former editor of Petersen's 4-Wheel & Offroading Magazine.
- Elana Scherr: the former Editor-In-Chief of Roadkill magazine and the Roadkill.com website.
- Terry the Terrier: a shop dog at Steve Dulcich's garage.

== Spin-offs and magazine ==
Roadkill has three spin-off series: Roadkill Garage, Roadkill's Junkyard Gold, and Faster with Newbern and Cotten, as well as a companion series called Roadkill Extra. All of these shows are available on Discovery+. All were cancelled as of November 2024.

Roadkill Garage is hosted by David Freiburger and Steve Dulcich. An episode involves modifying or repairing a roadkill vehicle, often reclaimed from Dulcich's farm.

Roadkill's Junkyard Gold features automotive historian Steve Magnante visiting junkyards and discussing the history of different models of vehicles he encounters, while also being tasked with finding new vehicles for Roadkill.

Faster with Newbern and Cotten (originally titled Faster with Finnegan) features Mike Cotten and David Newbern, and featured Mike Finnegan for the first 3 1/2 seasons. It features the trio repairing and modifying vehicles, many of which were previously featured on Roadkill.

Roadkill Extra is a shorter format with content such as question and answer sessions, tech tips, project updates, and other Roadkill information. Episodes range from 2 to 15 minutes in length. MotorTrend ceased publication of "extras" for all of their web shows at the end of 2020.

In 2015 the quarterly Roadkill magazine was launched. As of 12 January 2018 Mike Finnegan announced on The Kibbe and Finnegan Show that Roadkill Magazine had been cut.

== Vehicles ==
Name	Car	Fate	Episodes featured in
The Rotsun	A 1971 Datsun 240Z, the Rotsun was originally powered by a turbocharged Chevrolet 4.3L V6/5-speed from a Chevrolet S-10 truck. It now runs a turbocharged Ford 5.0 Mustang; both engines took the same turbo out of a Ford Powerstroke diesel engine.	Purchased by Finnegan post cancellation.	26, 42, 62, 65
Stubby Bob	Shortened, wheelstanding 1950 Ford F6 truck. Built with a boat V-drive and a rear-facing supercharged Chevy 454 with zoomie headers.	Purchased by Freiburger post cancellation.	44, 52, Daily Fix: Nov 13, 2016, 72
General Mayhem	‘68 Charger first rebuilt with used motor home parts, including a Mopar 440. Later upgraded with a Hellcat engine from a 2015 Dodge Charger Hellcat that was destined to be crushed. In 2021 it was bought back from Motor Trend by Freiburger and restored by Chris Birdsong and has its former motorhome 440.	Owned by Freiburger	23, 32, 43
Pace Arrow	Finnegan's c. 1978 Pace Arrow donor vehicle that provided the "glorious big block Mopar" and Carter Thermoquad carburetor for General Mayhem. The engine appeared in many episodes of Roadkill, Engine Masters and Roadkill Extra.	Scrapped	23
The Fury, My Old Friend	1973 Plymouth Fury purchased by Freiburger for Car Junkie TV. Driven in 24 Hours of Lemons. Donor vehicle (brakes, transmission, posi, hood scoop) for General Mayhem	Junkyard	22, 23
General Maintenance	Bone stock Dodge Charger Hellcat painted to look like the General Mayhem; Roadkill/TEN 'persuaded' to purchase it after comparison with Challenger & Viper off-road by Dodge.	Damaged while being driven to Hot Rod Garage Day 2024. Sold to a Motor Trend crew member post cancellation.	38, 43, 47, 50
The Muscle Truck	1974 Chevrolet C10 stepside shortbed truck. Custom header and mufflers on a Corvette LS6.	Owned by Freiburger.	18, 36
Raunchero	1968 Ford Ranchero, modeled after the magazine's car that ran the first Baja 1000.	On display at the Old Montana Prison & Auto Museum Complex.	2, 13, 14
BlaspHEMI	A 1955 Chevrolet on a Jim Meyer Racing chassis, with a blown 535 cubic-inch Mopar Hemi under its flip-top hood.	Owned by Finnegan. Now featuring a new blown Hemi. License Plate OMGHEMI.	8, 70
Crusher Camaro	A 1967 Chevrolet Camaro that was rescued from a junkyard crusher (which was featured in a Hot Rod Magazine article in 1993 when it was a buyback car for emission credits that pre-dated Cash for Clunkers), giving it its name.	Owned by Freiburger	19, 24
Draguar	A 1974 Jaguar XJ12 sedan with a supercharged Chevrolet V8.	Purchased by Freiburger post cancellation.	7, 41
The Ramp Truck	A 1973 Chevrolet ramp truck that was used by a Mazda dealership. Used to carry the Bonneville car.	Formerly Owned by Finnegan, Sold	20, 25
Leaf Blower Monza	1978 Chevrolet Monza Spyder, originally running five leaf blowers under the hatch as makeshift superchargers; later upgraded to having a trailer behind it with a separate Buick 350 engine making boost for the engine up front.	At Jeff Lutz's shop in Pennsylvania	16, 57
The Boost Caboose	A trailer-mounted 350 cubic inch small block Chevy salvaged from the junkyard 1956 Buick, powering a Vortech supercharger that fed the Leaf Blower Monza.	Disassembled	57
Macho Grande	Freiburger's (formerly) personal daily driver 1973 GMC Suburban with 350,000 miles on it; powered by a 454 Chevy.	Sold, last seen in Helsinki, Finland	8, 25
Vette Kart	A 1985 C4 Corvette stripped of its body parts.	Purchased by Finnegan post cancellation.	35, 50, Roadkill Extra Featurette
Crop Duster	A 1970 Plymouth Duster with a mid-1980s street racer look; originally fitted with the Mopar 440 that came out of the General Mayhem after the Hellcat swap, then upgraded to a stronger Mopar 383.	Owned by Freiburger.	40, Sep 23, 2017 Roadkill Extra
Missing Linc	A 1978 Lincoln Continental shortened from a sedan into a coupe.	Sold, and destined for 24 Hour of Lemons Glory.	63, Roadkill Extra (Bloopers)
The NasCarlo	A late-model stock car chassis with a 70's Monte Carlo body installed.	Purchased by Finnegan post cancellation.	46
The Renegade Jet Boat	A 1976 Rogers Bonneville Jet Boat. Finnegan and Freiburger drag an old Rogers Bonneville jet boat to Lake Elsinore behind the Muscle Truck, remove the engine from the truck, install it into the boat, go boating, take the engine back out of the boat, and re-install it into the truck.	Boat hull given to Joe Cole	36
Monte Carlo Lowrider	A 1980 V6 Monte Carlo with hydraulic suspension, driven on three wheels to Las Vegas.	Sold back to original builder	39
Subarute (built by Mighty Car Mods)	A Subaru Impreza wagon converted into a ute.	Last seen headed to Las Vegas for a car convention with Marty and Moog.	60
Mazdarati	1970s Mazda Rotary Pickup with a 455 Oldsmobile big-block and Toronado transaxle mounted in the bed.	Stolen during filming. Currently missing.	45, 51
The Mini-Truck	A chop-top Datsun Mini truck fitted with air suspension.	Sold by Motor Trend.	58
Harry Tow	1971 Ford Crew Cab 4x4 460-powered tow truck. Home-built 4x4 and tow rigging.	Listed on Craigslist July 30, 2022	48, 50, 78
Pig Pen	1950 GMC shortbed truck resurrected from/at Turner's Auto Wrecking in Fresno, California after 26 years off the road.	Sold to the father-in-law of the show's director. (Episode 50). Chassis swapped with GMC S15 in "Faster With Newbern and Cotten," S1, EP2.	31
The Hemi Gremmie	1975 AMC Gremlin with a 1976 grille; almost killed Finnegan and Freiburger once when a tire blew out on the highway.	Owned by Freiburger.	17, Ignition 129, 65(background), 72 (background).
The "Crusher" Impala	A 1969 Chevrolet Impala with the blown big block from the Crusher Camaro; Roadkill built it for Mighty Car Mods.	Owned by Freiburger.	60, 65
F-Bomb Camaro	An army green, twin-turbo 1973 Camaro owned by Freiburger.	Owned by Freiburger. Sitting at Nelson Racing Engines.	Roadkill Extra Mar 4, 2017, Fast & Furious 4
The Disgustang	A 1969 Mustang Mach 1 rescued from a junkyard. Also filled with rat poop. Blown engine under repairs by Lucky Costa after Freiburger trashed it doing donuts.	Sold by Freiburger.	66, 73
The Dreambird	A 1969 Pontiac Firebird that hadn't run in 17 years, which now has parts from three different engines in it. Used to race in One Lap of America.	Recently sold by Finnegan to his brother	67, 68
The Earle Camino	1977 Chevy El Camino that was a gutted, old, eighth-mile drag racing bracket car.	Traded to a friend of David Newbern	69
Rumble Bee	A 1970 Dodge Super Bee that Feiburger purchased in tribute to one he owned when he was 15 years old; powered by a 426 cubic inch Mopar Hemi.	Owned by Freiburger	70
Lost Boys Racing Hornet ^{[working-title]}	1973 AMC Hornet that "raced Baja in the '80s and finished the NORRA 1000 a couple of times before being parked in 2012." Beaten by a Dodge Grand Caravan at a rallycross at Glen Helen Raceway.	Sold by Motor Trend	71
LaPhonda	Finnegan's 1974 Honda Civic.	Sold on Craigslist	59, 74
He Hate Me / Econorado	A 1966 Ford Econoline that was chopped and given an Eldorado power train after Freiburger destroyed the original transmission attempting a burnout.	Sold on Craigslist	79, 91
Thelma and Louise	Early 1980s Oldsmobiles road raced then launched off a cliff at Glacier View, Alaska, for the Fourth of July.	Wreckage crushed by Freiburger driving an M35A2	83
The Road Wrecker	The "world's only C body Roadrunner," a destroyed 1968 Plymouth Roadrunner that Finnegan and Freiburger take dirt-oval racing at Willow Springs.	Donor car for the Wreck Runner (Satellite/Roadrunner clone) and General Mayhem 3.0	87
The Trailer of Doom	Four-wheel trailer at Steve Dulcich's farm that he calls a "hospice" for old car parts where they can rust for years before being scrapped.	Dulcich's farm	RKE 859, 930
The Super Sammy	1986 Suzuki Samurai found by Steve Magnante in a Junkyard Gold episode at Hidden Valley Auto Parts in Maricopa, Arizona. Rescued by Freiburger and Dulcich with a 440 engine swap and Thermoquad from a B300 van. Caught fire during filming.	Sold on Craigslist	JG8, RK78, RK92
The Crew Cab Chevelle	1966 Chevelle purchased by Freiburger for $1,000 to illustrate the potential of less desirable four-door cars. Freiburger and Dulcich swapped out the 283 engine for a 350 engine and a 350 turbo transmission and upgraded the suspension. Later equipped with nitrous.	Sold to "Camera Alex" Skola	RKG8, RKG9, RKG25, RKG37
The Vanishing Paint Challenger	1970 Dodge Challenger R/T reclaimed from Dulcich's "buffet" of rescued Mopars and given an engine swap with a 360 small-block Mopar out of a field truck, also part of the Dulcich fleet of neglected cars. The name is a play on the 1970 film Vanishing Point, which featured a 1970 Dodge Challenger R/T.	Sold to Derek Bieri of Vice Grip Garage	RKG4, RKG34, RKG36, RK85
The Ugly Truckling	A GMC crew cab built on the same concept as the Vette Kart, modeled after old 'rail job' dragsters and then driven 500 miles to the Roadkill Zip-Tie Drags.	Traded to L&L Auto Parts for a T-37 Pontiac	76
The Pork Chop Express	A 1971 Torino wagon with a 12V Cummins swapped into it, used to race Cleetus McFarland's Cummin's swapped Galaxie		104

== Features and expressions ==
- "Let me play for you the music of my people." A Finnegan expression brought about by the awesome exhaust note of Freiburger's muscle truck.
- "Because Roadkill": a comedic expression to justify a fiscally irresponsible or unnecessary piece of work on a vehicle, or to rationalise an inexplicable problem.
- "Best day at work ever": a sarcastic retort.
- "It'll be fine" or "It'll work perfectly/flawlessly": typically followed by a vehicle's failure.
- "Don't get it right, just get it running": Freiburger's philosophy.
- "Mint": Freiburger's description of any vehicle that has working doors, a front windshield, and headlights.
- "It'll DZUS right back": relating to a quarter turn DZUS brand fastener, which are used to hold panels of racecars. Used to describe the difficulty in reattaching a part removed from a vehicle.
- "Bam!": Freiburger's frequent exclamation.
- "I declare victory": Finnegan's exclamation.
- "That'll buff out": relating to damage on a vehicle.
- "Failure is like success": as failure is common within episodes, this retort is intended as a joke when things go wrong.
- Freiburger rarely wears actual shoes on the show.
- Cable ties are used for budget alterations.
- Finneganeconomics, or Finnenomics, a comedic theory of economic loss, relating to losing money on a car you restore.
- A comedic focus on the important elements of a vehicle such as wheels, neglecting equally important elements such as the engine.
- Referring to high quality parts being fitted to scrap cars.
- "Keep lowering your standards until you achieve a goal".
- "Tony broke it": a running joke of Tony Angelo breaking high performance cars.
- "I know the rules, so I'm allowed to break them": Finnegan's go-to expression before butchering a vehicle.
- "No gauges hence no bad news": inferring ignorance is bliss.
