= Cepek =

Cepek (feminine: Cepková) and Čepek (feminine: Čepková) are Czech surnames. Notable people with the surnames include:

- Dick Cepek (1930–1983), American businessman
- Petr Čepek (1940–1994), Czech actor
