= Off-Road Motorsports Hall of Fame =

The Off-Road Motorsports Hall of Fame is a hall of fame dedicated to notable competitors and contributors of off-road racing in North America. ORMHOF has an extensive digital collection of off-road related materials and maintains a collection of off-road vehicles that are on display at major automotive museums around the United States.

== History ==
In 1966, Ed Pearlman co-founded the first exclusively off-road racing organization, called the National Off-Road Racing Association (NORRA). The first event by NORRA (1967) was called the Mexican 1000 Rally, which was later renamed the Baja 1000.

Pearlman stopped promoting the series in 1976, so he decided to recognize contributors to the sport. He inducted the first sixteen members in the hall of fame in January 1978. He inducted a second group in 1980. He was unable to come up with a site to host the hall of fame.

Pearlman sold the series in 1995 to Rod Hall. While looking through Pearlman's boxes, Hall noticed Pearlman's notes about the hall of fame. Hall talked with Gordon Horsley of the National Automobile Museum, and the Hall of Fame became a resident in the National Automobile Museum.

== Categories of inductees ==
- Competition: motorcycles and ATVs, off-road racing, rally, rock crawling and sand sports
- Recreation: four wheeling, motorcycles and ATV's
- Pioneer: advocates, industry, and journalism

== Notable inductees ==
- Don Amador (2016)
- Edo Ansaloni (2007)
- David Ashley (2014) - Baja 1000 overall winner
- Larry Bergquist (2013)
- Ron Bishop (2011)
- Herman Booy (2004)
- Carla Boucher (2004)
- Peter K. Brown (2010)
- William A. (Bill) Bryan (2007)
- John Buffum (2004)
- Harry Buschert (1980) - CA4WDC founder
- Jean Calvin (2004)
- Shannon Campbell (2015)
- Dick Cepek (1978) - parts manufacturer
- Bob Chandler (2013)
- Eugene A. (Gene) Chappie (2010)
- Brian Chuchua (1978) - Riverside Grand Prix promoter
- Chris Collard (2015)
- Clark Collins (2006)
- Pete Condos (1978) - NORRA co-founder and Mint 500 promoter
- Frank DeAngelo (2013)
- Roy Denner (2012)
- Edward Dunkley (2004)
- Bud Ekins (1980) - Baja run record
- Charley Erickson (1978) - F.A.I.R. founder
- Manny Esquerra (2008)
- Walker Evans (2004) - Baja 1000 overall winner and MTEG champion
- Bud Feldkamp (2016) - Baja 1000 overall winner
- Marty Fiolka (2014)
- Sal Fish (2006)
- Jack Flannery (2009)
- Casey Folks (2012)
- Don Francisco (1978) - NORRA co-founder
- Nye Frank (2014)
- James Garner (1978) - celebrity racer
- Michael Gaughan (2015)
- Gilmon (Gil) George (2007)
- Robby Gordon (2019) - Baja 1000 overall winner and MTEG champion
- Chris Haines (2010)
- Rod Hall (2005) - Baja 1000 overall winner
- Bob Ham (2006)
- Jerry Herbst (2013) - Primm 300
- Vic Hickey (1978) - racecar designer
- David Higgins (2019) - Rally America overall champion
- Johnny Johnson (2010) - Baja 1000 overall winner
- Parnelli Jones (1978) - Baja 1000 overall winner
- Richard (Dick) Landfield (2007)
- John Lawlor (1980) - magazine writer
- Curt LeDuc (2015) - Primm 300 overall winner
- Walter B. Lott (2007)
- Rob MacCachren (2011) - Baja 1000 overall winner and LOORRS Pro 2 champion
- Joe MacPherson (2008)
- Mary McGee (2023) - first American woman to compete in motorsport
- Corky McMillin (2006)
- Scott McKenzie (2005)
- Steve McQueen (1978) - celebrity racer
- Roger Mears (2020) - MTEG champion
- Sue Mead (2007)
- Bruce Meyers (1978) - racecar designer
- Akton (Ak) Miller (2005)
- Drino Miller (1978) - Baja 1000 overall winner
- Larry Minor (2005) - Baja 1000 overall winner
- Ray Moon (1980) - CA4WDC executive
- Jim Ober (2016)
- Ed Pearlman (1978) - NORRA co-founder
- Jerry Penhall (2015)
- Rick Péwé (2010)
- Larry Ragland (2016) - Baja 1000 overall winner
- J.N. Roberts (2009)
- Larry Roeseler (2012)
- Nico Saad (2008)
- Bill Sanders (2014)
- Judy J. Smith (2008)
- Malcolm Smith (1978) - Baja 1000 overall winner
- Mark Smith (1980) - Jamboree promoter
- Harold Soens (2009)
- Roy Spuhler (2005)
- Cameron Steele (2018)
- Bob Steinberger (2013)
- Ivan Stewart (2006) - Baja 1000 overall winner and MTEG champion
- Bill Stroppe (1978) - Baja 1000 overall winner and racecar designer
- Mickey Thompson (2007) - SCORE and MTEG founder
- Tracy Valenta (2016)
- Frank "Scoop" Vessels (2007)
- Ed Waldheim (2005)
- Thurston Warn (1978) - parts manufacturer
- Vic Wilson (1978) - Baja 1000 overall winner and Saddleback Park founder
