= Don Francisco =

Don Francisco may refer to:

- Don Francisco (musician)
- Don Francisco (television host)
- Don Francisco de Paula Marín
- Don Francisco, a co-founder of the National Off-Road Racing Association
