= Jp (magazine) =

- The June 2012 issue of Jp.
- Categories: Automobile magazine
- Frequency: 10 per year
- Total circulation: 76,139 (December 2011)
- Founded: 1996
- Final issue: March 2020
- Company: Motor Trend Group
- Country: USA
- Based in: Los Angeles
- Language: English
- Website: www.jpmagazine.com
- ISSN: 1097-2730

Jp was an American magazine devoted to Jeeps, Jeep history, and the off-roading lifestyle. It was published by the Motor Trend Group. It was reported that the magazine was among 19 publications to be discontinued in March 2020 by Motor Trend Group.

== History ==
Jp was a Jeep-only publication. It was established in 1996 by Dobbs Publishing Group, which was then acquired by Petersen Publishing Company. Petersen Publishing was sold the title to EMAP in 1998, which sold the former Petersen magazines to Primedia (now Rent Group) in 2001.

Jp was essentially a do-it-yourself manual for any Jeep owner looking to modify, restore, and maintain their Jeep, and each issue contained articles on products, how-to's, upgrades, performance tests, product shootouts, and more. Events were also covered in the magazine, from trail rides in the USA to international competitions and off-road events. Also featured were stories on Jeep history, news, and concept vehicles. The magazine covered Jeep trends and trends in the aftermarket industry.

== Types of Jeeps ==
Jp covered every Jeep vehicle model in history. These included the Jeep Wrangler, Jeep CJ, Jeep Grand Cherokee, Jeep Cherokee, Jeep Wagoneer, Jeepster Commando, Jeep Forward Control, Jeep Liberty, Jeep Commander, Jeep Compass, and Jeep Patriot.

== Project Jeeps ==
Jp did multiple Jeep buildups over the years, from "low-buck" to putting in crazy engines. Some of the project Jeeps were:

2007 Jeep Wrangler, Penny Pincher
1978 Jeep Cherokee Chief, The Monkey Bus
1999 Jeep Cherokee Sport, Project JR 2.0
Various Jeeps, The Sh!tbox Derby
Flatfender Chassis Jeep hot rod, Jeep Rat Rod/Sloppy Seconds
1968 Jeepster Commando, Jeepster Resurrection
1968 Jeep J2000, Project J2008
Jeep CJ-5, Project Hatari or $13 Jeep
1998 Jeep Cherokee, Project Mileage Master
Jeep Buggy Poison Spyder Customs Brusier, Jeep Juggy or Time Bandit
2007 Jeep Wrangler, Ready-to-Run

== Editors ==
The following persons were editors-in-chief of Jp :

- Christian Hazel
- John Cappa
- Rick Pewe
- Rob Reaser

== Books ==
- How to Modify Your Jeep Chassis and Suspension for Off-Road
