= Petersen's 4-Wheel & Off-Road =

American automobile magazine

- Categories: Automobile magazine
- Frequency: Monthly
- Total circulation: 289,774 (June 2012)
- Founded: 1977
- Final issue: December 2019
- Company: Motor Trend Group
- Country: USA
- Based in: El Segundo, California
- Language: English
- Website: www.4wheeloffroad.com
- ISSN: 0162-3214

Petersen's 4-Wheel & Off-Road was an automobile magazine dedicated to 4x4 and off-road trucks and SUVs. The first issue was published in 1977; it began as a special-interest publication from the editors of Hot Rod magazine. 4-Wheel & Off-Road covered a range of topics for the do-it-yourself light-truck enthusiast, including real-world 4x4 performance modifications, new products and product evaluations, off-road event coverage, new-vehicle evaluations, travel, and lifestyle. In March 1978, the magazine officially became a monthly publication, and in 2013, 4-Wheel & Off-Road celebrated its 35th anniversary. It was published by the Motor Trend Group. On December 6, 2019, magazine-publishing industry news outlet Folio: reported the magazine was among 19 publications to be discontinued by Motor Trend Group by the end of 2019.

== History ==
When it was first published as a specialty magazine by Petersen Publishing Company, internal paperwork described the concept simply as a Petersen four-wheel and off-road magazine, with a title to be suggested later. The legal department trademarked Petersen's 4-Wheel & Off-Road, and the name of the magazine was officially born. Over the years, many readers and members of the automotive industry have referred to the magazine simply as "Petersen's." In January 1991, the name and logo changed to Petersen's 4Wheel, with the magazine returning to its original name by the October issue of that same year. Although it is now published by Source Interlink Media, Petersen's remains in the name and on the logo.

The first issue of 4-Wheel & Off-Road included new-truck road tests, hands-on tech stories, and a tire buyer's guide, and dirt bikes and vans were tested alongside the Jeep CJ-7, Ford F-250, and International Traveler. The popular Nuts & Bolts Q&A technical column began in July 1978, while the industry-news column Drivelines came about in November 1987. Reflecting trends and interests in the industry, 4-Wheel & Off-Road also covered monster trucks heavily in the 1980s, with Bigfoot making its first appearance in May 1979.

Themed issues in the magazine's history include "Dare to Be Different", "Ugly is In", "Homegrown How-Tos", "Jeep Thrills", and "4xFords". Chuck Norris was featured on the cover of the March 1987 issue of 4-Wheel & Off-Road, with the cover blurb "Chuck Norris Jumps into Off-Road Racing." 4-Wheel & Off-Road went through a "daring" phase of placing cover vehicles in unnaturally settings via airbrush, such as a monster truck surfing down the face of a tsunami or one superimposed over a nuclear explosion.

"Ugly Readers Rides" began in the August 1992 issue, spotlighting the emerging trend of beater trucks. January 2000 introduced the growing popularity of rock buggies. The February issue of the same year featured the first coverage of a competitive rockcrawling competition. Vehicle buildups, or project vehicles, have been a part of 4-Wheel & Off-Road since the January 1979 issue, which focused on building a street-worthy off-road van.

Beginning in 1994, 4-Wheel & Off-Road shifted from show trucks to real-world trucks, a trend that continues today.

== Ultimate Adventure ==
The 4-Wheel & Off-Road "Ultimate Adventure" was created by the magazine's editorial staff and consists of 20 handpicked 4x4s, including ones owned by readers, which travel to different regions of the country each year to conquer four to five extreme trails in one week. The first Ultimate Adventure appeared in the February 2000 issue, traveling the trails and pavement of Arizona, New Mexico, and Colorado, and Ultimate Adventure has remained an annual event since then. Segments of Ultimate Adventure are broadcast on television on the Outdoor Channel.

The project vehicles the magazine staff has built for Ultimate Adventure are:

- Ultimate A1, 1952 M38A1
- Ultimate Super Duty, '02 Ford F-250 Super Duty
- Ultimate Avalanche, '03 Chevy Avalanche 2500
- Ultimate Taco, '01 Toyota Tacoma
- Ultimate K10, '75 Chevy half-ton
- Ultimate FJ, '06 Toyota FJ Cruiser
- UAJK, '07 Jeep Wrangler Unlimited
- Ultimate Z71, ‘00 GMC Sierra
- Ultimate Ranch Truck, a rebuild of the Ultimate Super Duty
- Ultimate CJ, ‘76 Jeep CJ-7, later called the CJ-17 due to its B-17-inspired theme
- Ultimate F-150, ‘11 Ford F-150 EcoBoost
- Ultimate JK, '12 Jeep Wrangler with the back half replaced with the front of another Wrangler
- Ultimate Super Dirty, '13 Ford F-250 Super Duty turned into a regular cab shortbed.
- Ultimate Tug Truck, '90 Dodge Diesel converted from a retired airplane tug into the Ultimate Adventure truck.
- Ultimate Summer Camp Jeep, a custom body '46 Willys Jeep CJ2A powered by a 6.2L LSA engine (same engine as the Cadillac CTS-V) and a 6-speed GM 6L90 automatic transmission.
- Ultimate Adventure CJ-6D, a chopped and channeled 1970 Jeep CJ-6 built on a shortened JKU frame with a Cummins R2.8 Turbo Diesel
- Ultimate Adventure Deranged Rover, a Camel Trophy inspired 1989 Range Rover Classic also powered by a Cummins R2.8 Turbo Diesel
- Ultimate Adventure Ultimate International, a 1964 International Harvester 800 with raised and stretched wheel openings, a chopped top and more
- Ultimate Adventure Long Range Jeep (LRJ), a SAS themed 1942 Willys MB inspired Jeep LJ with a Cummins R2.8 Turbo Diesel, a reproduction MB grille cut like the British SAS did in North Africa in WWII, and more
- Ultimate Adventure Ultimate Shop Truck, a 2006 Toyota Tundra 4.7L V-8 with 1-ton axles, 38 inch tires, a bed 'cage with bed-sides, 1983 SR5 4x4 livery, and more

== Event coverage ==
In the first monthly issue of 4-Wheel & Off-Road, the staff rode along with Walker Evans as he raced in the Baja 1000, and both the 1000 and Baja 500 were covered extensively in the lifespan of the magazine. Editorial has also followed tough-truck racing, 4-Wheel & Off-Road Jamboree Nationals, Petersen's U.S. Truck Fest, 4-Wheel & Off-Road 4xFun Fests, sand drags, swamp buggy competitions, ice racing, truck and tractor pulls, mud bogging, SCORE, rockcrawling, competitive rockcrawling, Camel Trophy, Gravelrama, and trails throughout the U.S. and internationally, including Moab in Utah and the Black Hills in South Dakota. 4-Wheel & Off-Road has also tracked new-4x4 reveals at the North American Auto Show in Detroit and new products brought to the market by aftermarket companies at the annual SEMA Show.

== 4x4 of the Year ==
The 4-Wheel & Off-Road "4x4 of the Year" award is one of the most prestigious in the automotive industry, bestowed annually upon a new factory 4x4 pickup truck or SUV that excels in five categories: Ride and Drive, Mechanical, Interior, Exterior, Four-Wheeling Attributes, and Empirical Data.

Winners of the 4x4 of the Year award:

- 2016 Toyota Tacoma TRD Off-Road
- 2015 Toyota 4Runner TRD Pro
- 2014 Range Rover Sport
- 2013 Jeep Wrangler Moab
- 2012 Jeep Wrangler Rubicon (3.6L V-6)
- 2011 Land Rover LR4 HSE
- 2010 Ford F-150 SVT Raptor (5.4L V-8)
- 2009 Suzuki Equator Crew Cab RMZ-4
- 2008 Toyota Land Cruiser
- 2007 Jeep Wrangler Rubicon JK
- 2006 Dodge Ram 1500 TRX4
- 2005 Jeep Grand Cherokee (IFS)
- 2004 Volkswagen Touareg V-8
- 2003 Lexus GX 470
- 2002 Jeep Grand Cherokee (4.7 HO V-8)
- 2001 Jeep Grand Cherokee (5-speed auto transmission)
- 2000 Toyota Tundra
- 1999 Jeep Grand Cherokee (4.7 V-8 Limited)
- 1998 Jeep Grand Cherokee (5.9 V-8 Limited)
- 1997 Jeep Wrangler Sport TJ
- 1996 Jeep Grand Cherokee (w/ center diff lock)
- 1995 Dodge Ram (2500 V-10 longbed Club Cab)
- 1994 Dodge Ram (1500 V-8 shortbed regular cab)
- 1993 Jeep Grand Cherokee
- 1992 Chevrolet Blazer (fullsize)
- 1991 Dodge Dakota
- 1990 Nissan Pathfinder (4-door)
- 1989 Toyota pickup
- 1988 Jeep Cherokee (4.0 engine)
- 1987 Nissan Pathfinder (2-door)
- 1986 Ford Ranger
- 1985 Isuzu Trooper II
- 1984 Jeep Cherokee (2.8 engine)
- 1983 Chevrolet S-10 Blazer

== Editors ==
The following persons have been editor-in-chief of the magazine:

- Christian Hazel: 2016–Present
- Fred Williams: 2014–2016
- Rick Péwé: 2000–2014
- Cole Quinnell: 1998-2000
- David Freiburger: 1994-1998
- Drew Hardin: 1991-1994
- Steve Campbell: 1986-1991
- John Stewart: 1985-1986
- Mike Anson: 1985
- Michael Coates: 1983-1985
- Craig Caldwell: 1979-1983
- Mike Anson: 1978-1979

== Books ==
- 4-Wheel & Off-Road Chassis & Suspension Handbook (2004) (ISBN 9781557884060)
