= Ron Bishop =

American motorcycle racer

Ron Bishop (March 12, 1943 – September 20, 2014) was an American off-road motorcycle racer. He was a long-term participant in the Baja 1000 and other desert off-road races.

== Early life ==
Bishop was born at Woodland, Washington, and moved with his family to Escondido in Southern California when he was 10 years old.

== Racing career ==
Bishop became caught up in the off-road racing scene. He began racing in 1960 at a TT race on Friday nights at Cajon Speedway and would convert the bike to for scrambles later in the weekend. He didn't like the wait between races so he switched to enduro, hare scramble, and desert off-road racing to eliminate the boring wait between races. He is best known for his participation in the Baja 1000, where he held the distinction of being the only racer to have competed in every Baja 1000 on a motorcycle (from the first race in 1967 to his 2012 retirement). His top finish was a second place overall in 1972 when he co-rode with Don Bohannon. Bishop won class titles in the Baja 1000, Baja 500, Mint 400, Tecate 500, and Mexicali 300 between the 1960s and 2000s. He was a factory rider for Kawasaki and Rokon. In the mid-1970s, he was twice invited on the American team for the International Six Days Trial (now the International Six Days Enduro).

Bishop scaled down the large lighting systems being used in off-road trucks for motorcycles. The Off-Road Motorsports Hall of Fame also cited how he mentored many young up-and-coming riders who later became champions.

== Retirement and death ==
Bishop was the long-term owner of Ron Bishop Motorcycles, a motorcycle dealership in Escondido, California. Bishop was found dead at his home in September 2014 by his friends. His death was initially believed to be from natural causes.

== Halls of Fame ==
Bishop was inducted into the AMA Motorcycle Hall of Fame in 2001. He was also inducted in the Off-Road Motorsports Hall of Fame in 2011. Right before his death, he was announced as a 2015 inductee in the Trailblazers Hall of Fame.
