= Rod Hall (racer) =

American racing driver (died 2019)

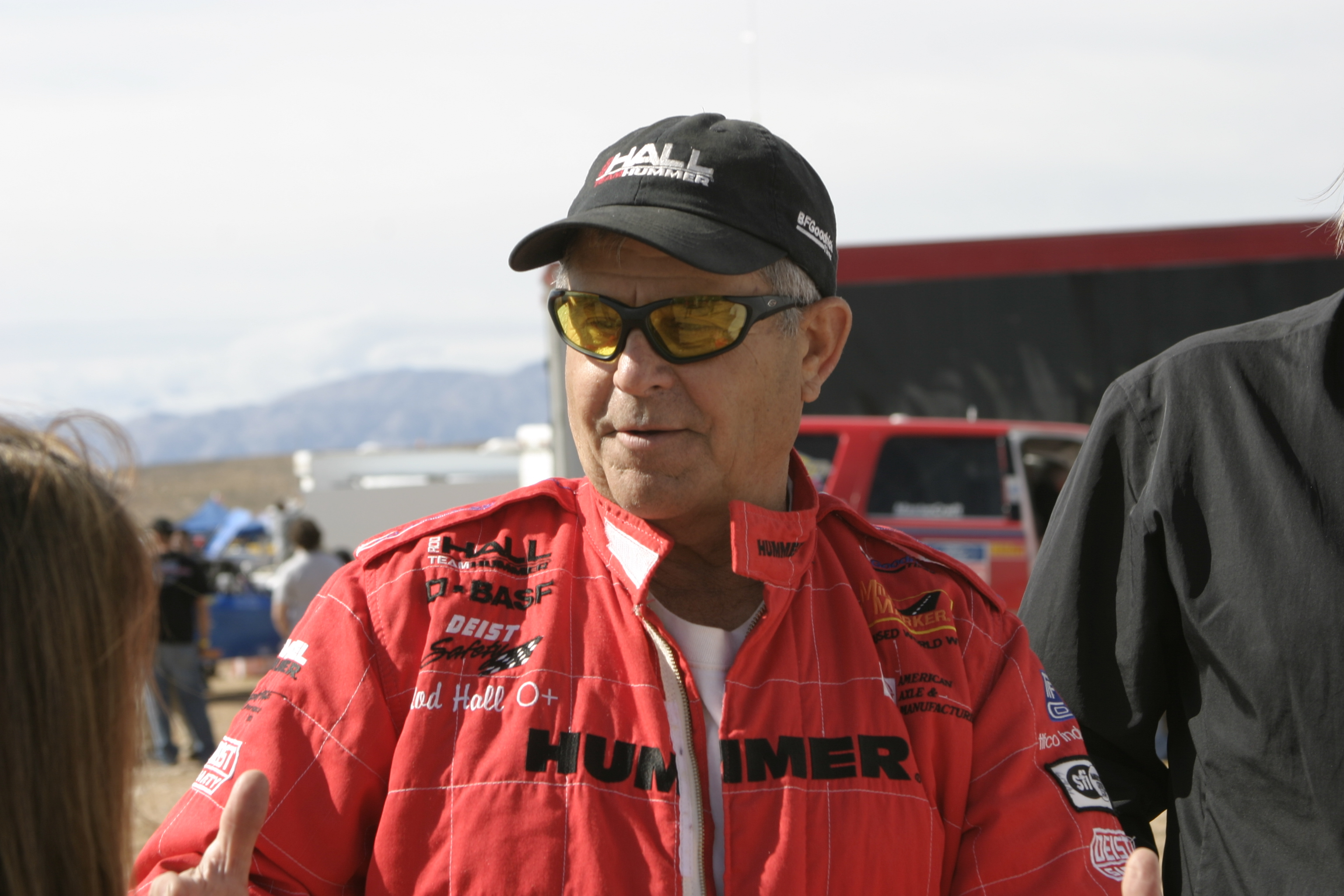
The Hall family has raced every Baja 1000 in a four-wheeled vehicle, first Rod and now his children.

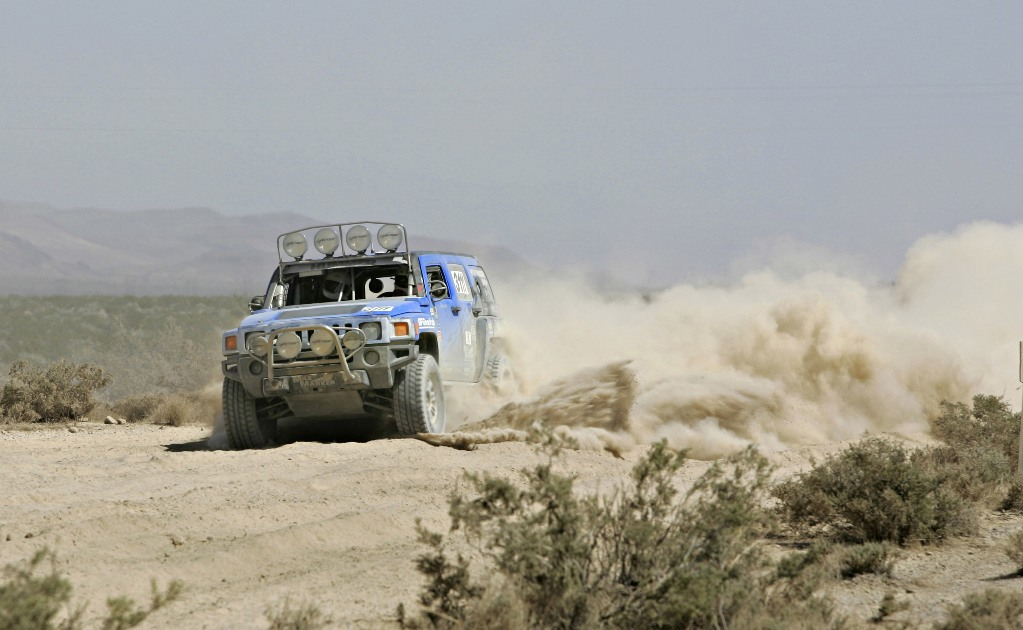
Hall pilots the stock-class Hummer H3 in SCORE International and Best in the Desert off-road races.

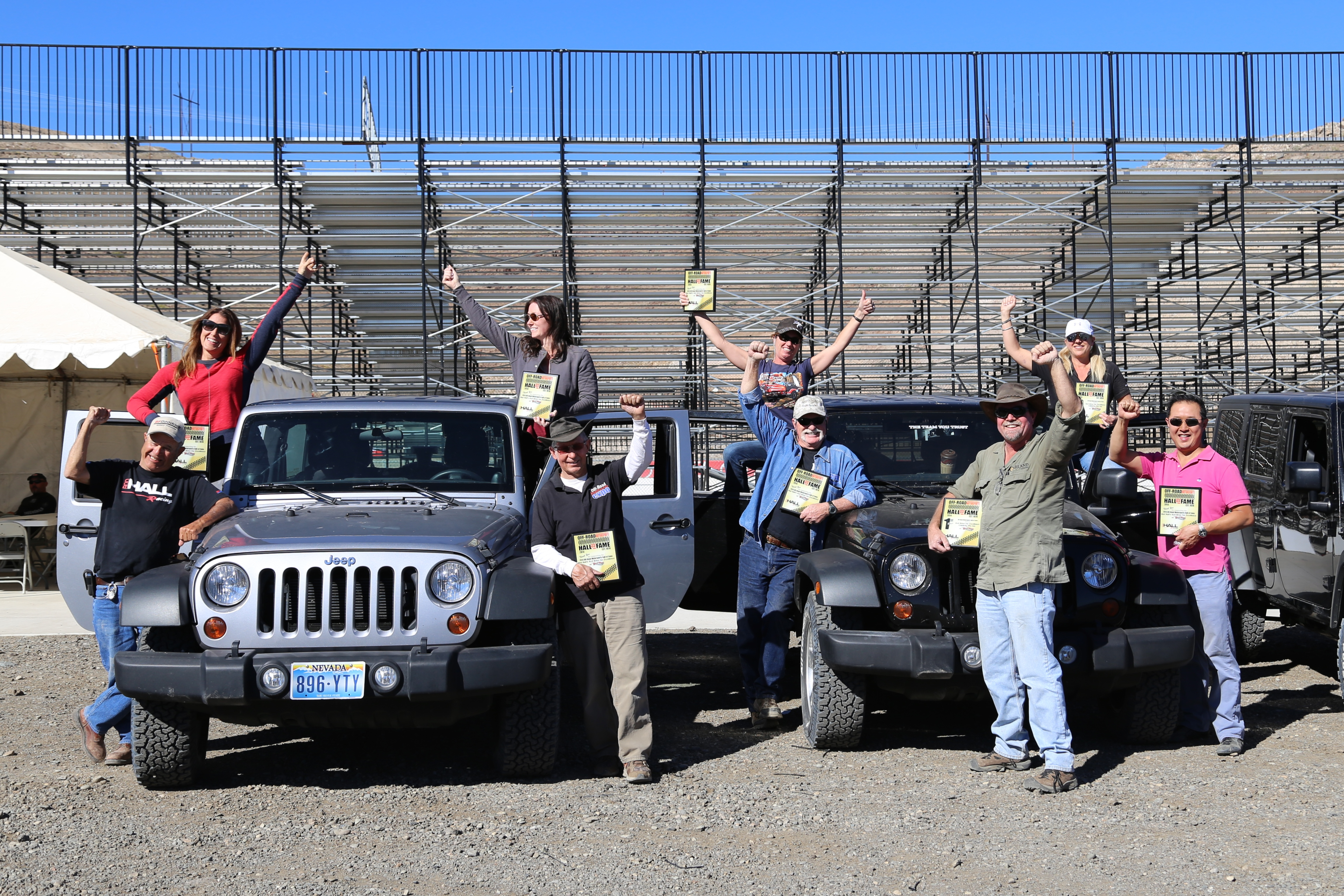
Rod Hall celebrates with off-road celebrities at Rod Hall DRIVE event in October 2014

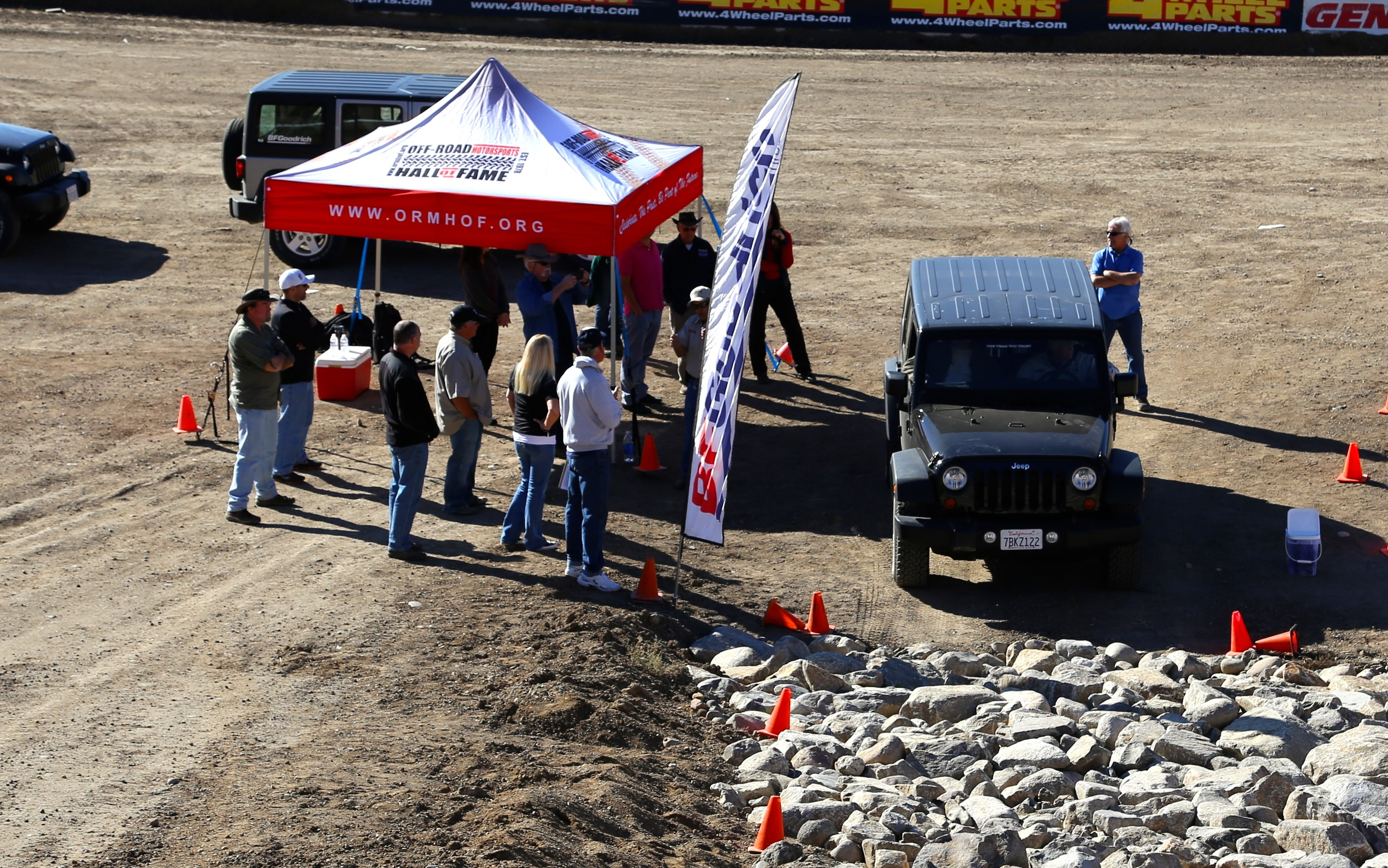
Rod Hall briefs competitors during a Rod Hall DRIVE off-road driving school celebrity competition at Wild West Motorsports Park in October 2014

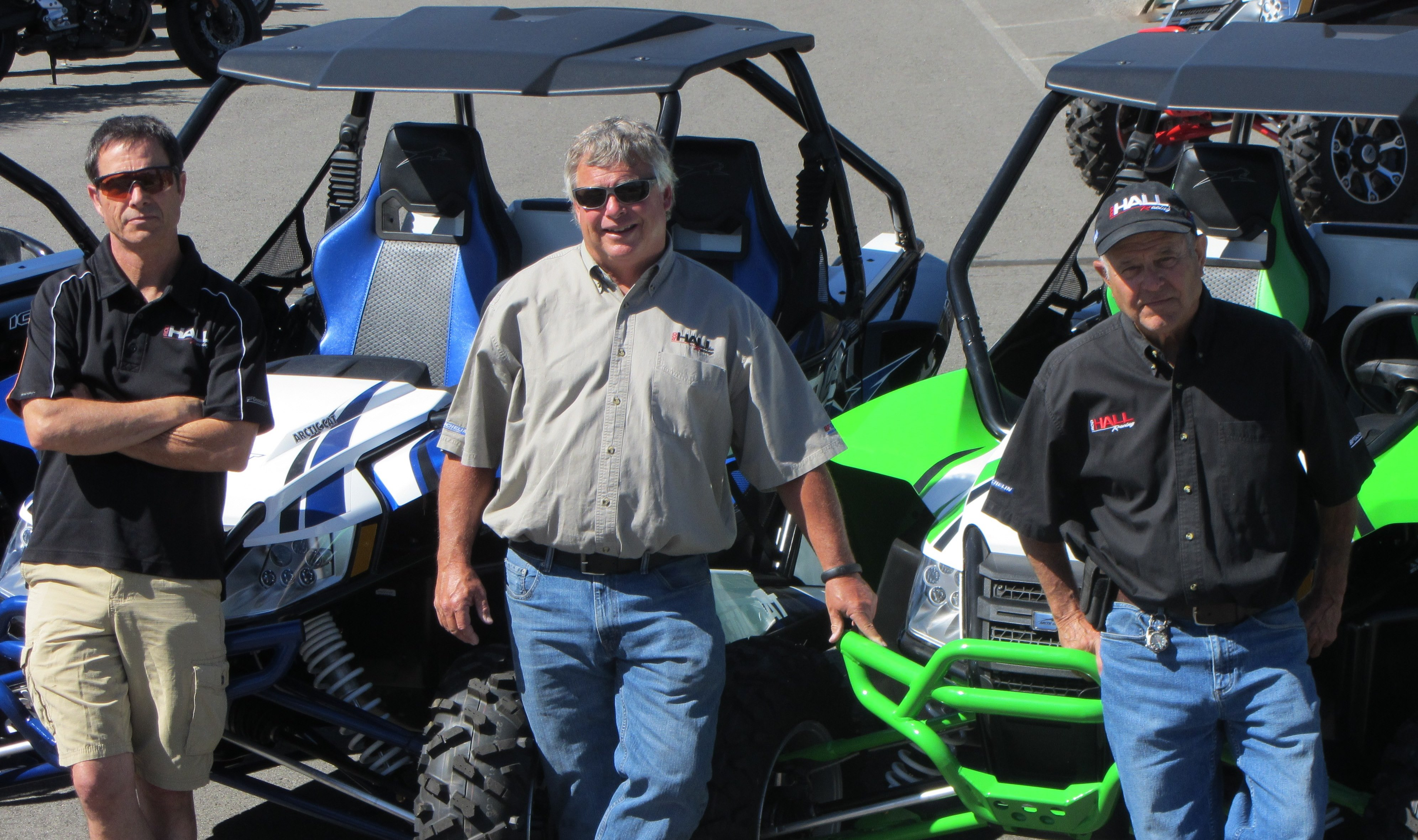
Josh Hall, Mike Winkel and Rod Hall - The Rod Hall DRIVE Off-road Driving School Principals in front of a few of their Arctic Cat Wildcat performance vehicles. September 2014

Rod Hall (November 22, 1937 – June 14, 2019 (aged 81)) was an American professional off-road racer. He was inducted in the Off-road Motorsports Hall of Fame in 2005. He has spent his entire adult life around four-wheel-drive vehicles. He competed in fifty straight Baja 1000 races and had class wins in 25 of them. At his death, he had the most desert off-road race wins.

== Racing career ==
His racing career began in the 1960s, when organized off-road competition was just beginning. Traveling from his Hemet, California, home to races in the Rocky Mountains and desert Southwest, Hall quickly earned a reputation for going faster than other competitors – and surviving races with less vehicle damage. He won the 1964 Afton Canyon Jeep Junket near Riverside, California, in what may have been one of the first organized off-road races in the United States.

As the popularity of organized off-road racing mushroomed in the late-1960s, so did Hall's success behind the wheel. In 1967 he won the inaugural NORRA Mexican 1000 Rally (the race now known as the SCORE International Baja 1000). He won the overall Baja 1000 race in 1969. As of 2016, Hall was the only racer to have competed in every Baja 1000 in a four-wheeled vehicle. He raced in the first fifty Baja 1000 races with his final start in 2017 when he was nearly 80 years old.

Hall remains the only driver to win Baja overall in a four-wheel-drive vehicle. He has accumulated over 160 major event wins and more than a dozen SCORE/HDRA & Best in the Desert (BitD) championship titles. His string of 35 consecutive race wins in the early 1980s remains the longest unbroken string of race victories in off-road racing history.

=== Hummer ===
Hall switched to Hummer in 1993. In addition to being the owner of Team HUMMER, Hall is partner with Mike Winkel in Reno's Rod Hall/Winkel HUMMER. His franchise was the first stand-alone Hummer dealership in the country. Hall regularly conducted BF Goodrich tire seminars, HUMMER Happenings for dealerships and corporate excursions in HUMMER vehicles.

Hall is the driver of the new Hummer H3 SUV race truck, which debuted in the 2005 BitD “Vegas to Reno” competition and helped Hall earn his record 18th Baja 1000 victory in November 2005. Hall retired the Hummer race team from full race series action in 2009, but continues to field a Hummer entry at the Baja 1000. Hall captured his record-breaking 19th, 20th and 21st Baja 1000 class wins in his H3 in 2007, 2009 & 2012.

Hall switched to helping to train drivers though his Rod Hall DRIVE program. The Rod Hall DRIVE off-road driving school was located at the Wild West Motorsports Park in Reno, Nevada.

=== Driving style ===
On a SCORE video, Hall described his driving style, "I was never a fast guy, and I was never the first guy to the first checkpoint. But I did learn that you don’t go any slower than you have to in the rough stuff, maybe you can just pull out a mile and a half faster than the other guys without beatin’ up your car. Anybody can go fast in the fast area, but it’s the slower areas, I think, where I learned how to win races."

== Personal life ==
Hall and his wife Donna had two sons, and they now have third generation racers. Chad Hall races production vehicles, and currently runs Rod Hall Products amongst other businesses. Chad also raced Hummer H1s but has switched focus to the Chevrolet Colorado ZR2, Silverado T1XX, and his Spec Trophy Truck. Rod Hall Products currently works on the Colorado-based Infantry Squad Vehicle project of the United States Army with GM Defense and Hendrick Motorsports.

Josh Hall currently races a UTV in select races, with his daughter Shelby Hall.

He lived with his wife Donna at Reno, Nevada, at the end of his life.

== Death ==
Hall died on June 14, 2019 at 81 years old. He had progressive supranuclear palsy for the last few years of his life.

Former SCORE owner Sal Fish said, "Rod Hall was one of the founding fathers of desert racing and certainly a major pillar in the history of SCORE desert racing. Rod was one of the elite racers for over 40 years but he always maintained his humble personality and was as approachable, as friendly and as open with a handshake and a friendly smile as the first time I met him when I did a little racing back in 1969."
