= European Car =

- Categories: Automobile magazine
- Frequency: Monthly
- Publisher: Motor Trend Group
- Founded: 1978
- Final issue: 2018
- Company: Source Interlink
- Country: USA
- Language: English
- Website: www.europeancarweb.com
- ISSN: 1056-8476

European Car was an American automotive enthusiast magazine published by the Motor Trend Group. The magazine was in circulation between 1978 and 2018

== History and profile ==
The magazine was started in late 1978 with the name VW Greats. In February 1979 it was renamed VW & Porsche, a Volkswagen enthusiast magazine. During this period it was published on a bimonthly basis.

Later the title was changed in the 1990s and in addition to VW, the magazine covered BMW, Porsche, Audi, and Italian and British prestige brands. Although its main focus was the tuning of those cars, factory new car news and DIY repairs were also featured. Additionally, there were features of past "classic" models by the same group of manufacturers. It was published on a monthly basis. The magazine ended publication in early 2018.
