= Jeep Wrangler =

Four-wheel-drive off-road SUV produced by Jeep

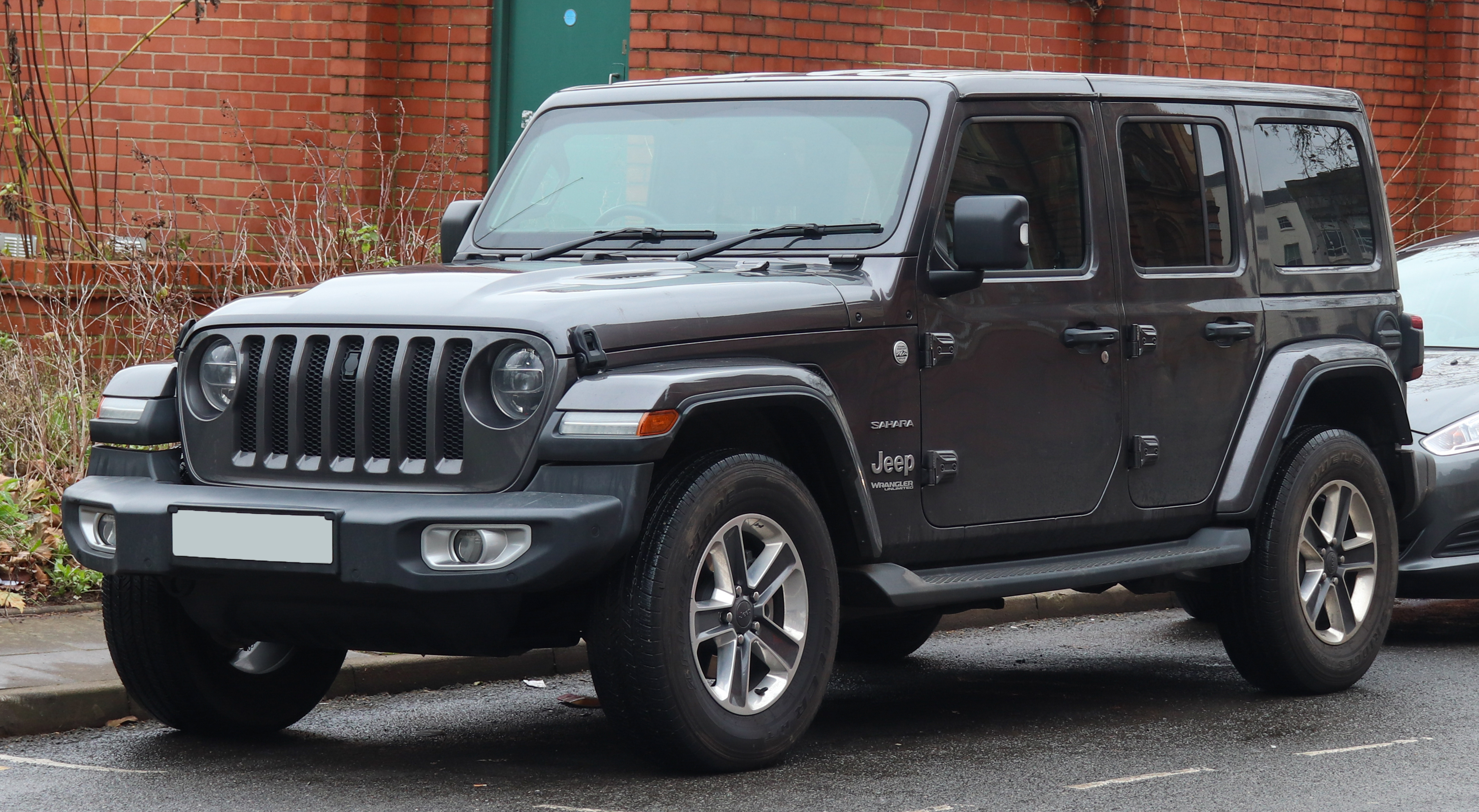
- Jeep Wrangler Unlimited, Sahara edition

Overview
- Manufacturer: Jeep (Note: American Motors (1987–1988); Chrysler Corporation (1988–1998); DaimlerChrysler (1998–2007); Chrysler LLC (2007–2009); Chrysler Group LLC (2009–2014); FCA US LLC (2014–2021); Stellantis North America (2021–present))
- Production: 1986–present

Body and chassis
- Class: Compact SUV (2-door); Mid-size SUV (4-door)
- Layout: Front engine, rear-wheel drive / four-wheel drive
- Chassis: Body-on-frame
- Related: AIL Storm

Chronology
- Predecessor: Jeep CJ

The Jeep Wrangler is a series of compact and mid-size off-road SUVs manufactured by Jeep since 1986, and currently in its fourth generation. The Wrangler JL, the most recent generation, was unveiled in late 2017 and is produced at Jeep's Toledo Complex.

The Wrangler is a direct progression from the World War II Jeep, through the CJ (Civilian Jeeps) produced by Willys, Kaiser-Jeep, and American Motors Corporation (AMC) from the mid-1940s through the 1980s. Although neither AMC nor Chrysler (after it purchased AMC in 1987) have claimed that the Wrangler was a direct descendant of the original military model, both the CJ Jeeps and the conceptually consistent Wrangler, with their solid axles and open top, have been called the Jeep model as central to Jeep's brand identity as the rear-engine 911 is to Porsche.

Similar to the Willys MB and the CJ Jeeps before it, all Wrangler models continue to use a separate body and frame, rigid live axles both front and rear, a tapering nose design with flared fenders, a fold-flat windshield, and can be driven without doors. With few exceptions, they also have part-time four-wheel drive systems, with the choice of high and low gearing, and standard open bodies with removable hard or soft tops. However, the Wrangler series was specifically redesigned to be safer and more comfortable on-road, to attract more daily drivers, by upgrading its suspension, drivetrain, and interior, compared to the CJ line. The suspension on all Wranglers included trackbars and anti-roll bars, and, from the 1997 TJ onwards, front and rear coil springs instead of the previous leaf springs.

From 2004 onward, the Wrangler has been complemented with long-wheelbase versions, called Wrangler Unlimited. 2004–2006 models were longer versions with 2 doors. In 2004, only automatic transmission-equipped "Unlimited" versions were sold. In 2005, both an automatic and manual 6-speed (NSG-370) were offered. Since 2007, the long-wheelbase Wranglers were four-door models, offering over 20 in (508 mm) more room. By mid-2017, the four-door models represented three-quarters of all new Wranglers on the market.

== Background ==
Outwardly resembling the Jeep CJ-7, the first Wrangler – formally announced in February 1986 at the 1986 Chicago Auto Show – was said to be based on a new set of design parameters. François Castaing (AMC VP of Product Engineering) stated that "The product philosophy behind the two vehicles is completely different".

The new car had a wider track, slightly less ground clearance, improved handling, and additional passenger comfort features. The YJ still had leaf spring suspension similar to that of the CJ; however, the springs were wider, and the first Wrangler had trackbar suspension links and anti-roll bars for improved handling and safety, making it less likely to roll by untrained or unwary drivers.

=== Manufacturing ===
Jeep YJ models were manufactured from 1986 and 1995 at Brampton Assembly, and subsequently at the Toledo South Assembly plant. A major difference in the 1987–1995 models were the rectangular headlights, which reverted to rounded ones in the TJ and then JK versions. In 2006, Wrangler production was moved to Toledo Complex. Post-2006 Wranglers were set apart from their predecessors by the angle of the grille. In all previous models, the grille was flat and even with the front fenders. The newer Wrangler was constructed with a grille that angled out from the top and then continued in a straight line from the midway point, toward the bottom. This decreased the hood length while increasing the length of the fenders. In more recent models, this angle has been lowered more toward the bottom of the grille. In Egypt, the YJ was produced in both short and long-wheelbase versions. The extended wheelbase retained the 2-door design and was dubbed LJ (or labeled as YJL in Egypt's Owner's Manual). The long-wheelbase continued as TJL (aka J8), inspiring the JK's 4-door version.

== Models ==
The Wrangler debuted in 1986 as a new model after the discontinuance of the Jeep CJ series. It was revised in 1996, and completely redesigned in 2006. In addition to the model's name Wrangler, each model received a designation corresponding to its generation: YJ (1986–1995), TJ (1997–2006), JK (2007–2018), and the current JL model. Foreign military versions of the Wrangler have carried the J8 designation, which was initially dubbed TJL when first produced at Arab American Vehicle's Egyptian plant. The Wrangler-based pickup truck, the Gladiator, began production in 2019 for the 2020 model year.

=== YJ (1987) ===
YJ
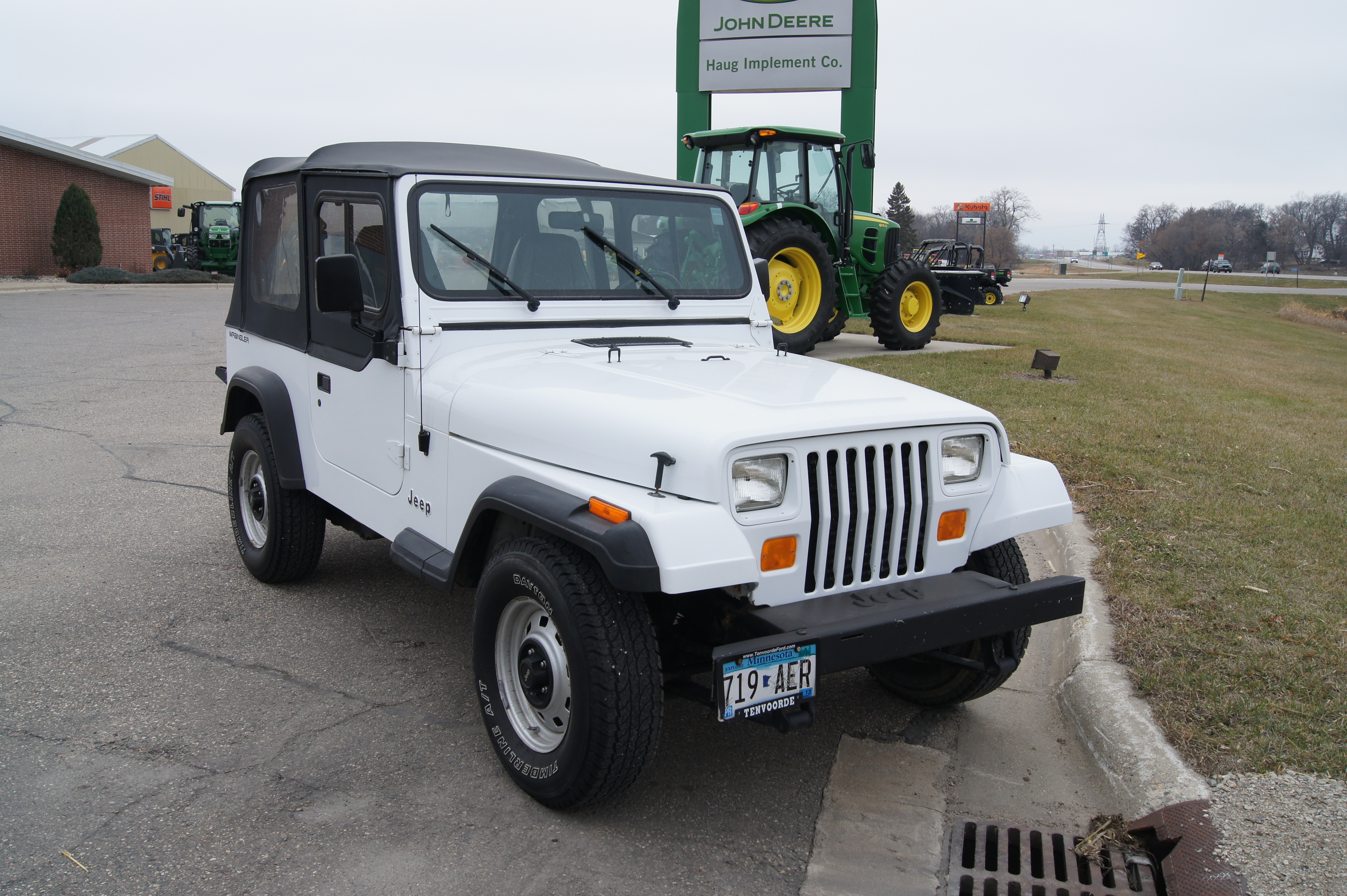

Overview
- Production: March 1986 – December 1995 (Canada; USA); 1989–2001 (Iran); 1995–1998 (Indonesia)

Body and chassis
- Body style: 2-door convertible; 2-door SUV
- Related: AIL Storm I

Although introduced May 13, 1986, as a 1987 model, and by August 1987 (the 1988 second model year) under the new ownership of Chrysler, the first-generation Wrangler had been developed by American Motors Corporation (AMC, under the control of Renault at that time). It featured rectangular headlamps, differing from the round ones on its predecessors, the CJ Jeeps. The new 'Wrangler' was a new design, and compared to the CJ-7, it had a wider track, slightly less ground clearance, and improved comfort, safety, and handling. It continued many features of the CJ-7, such as part-time 4WD, live rigid front and rear axles on leaf springs, and an open body on a separate frame. It maintained the same wheelbase.

=== TJ (1997) ===
TJ
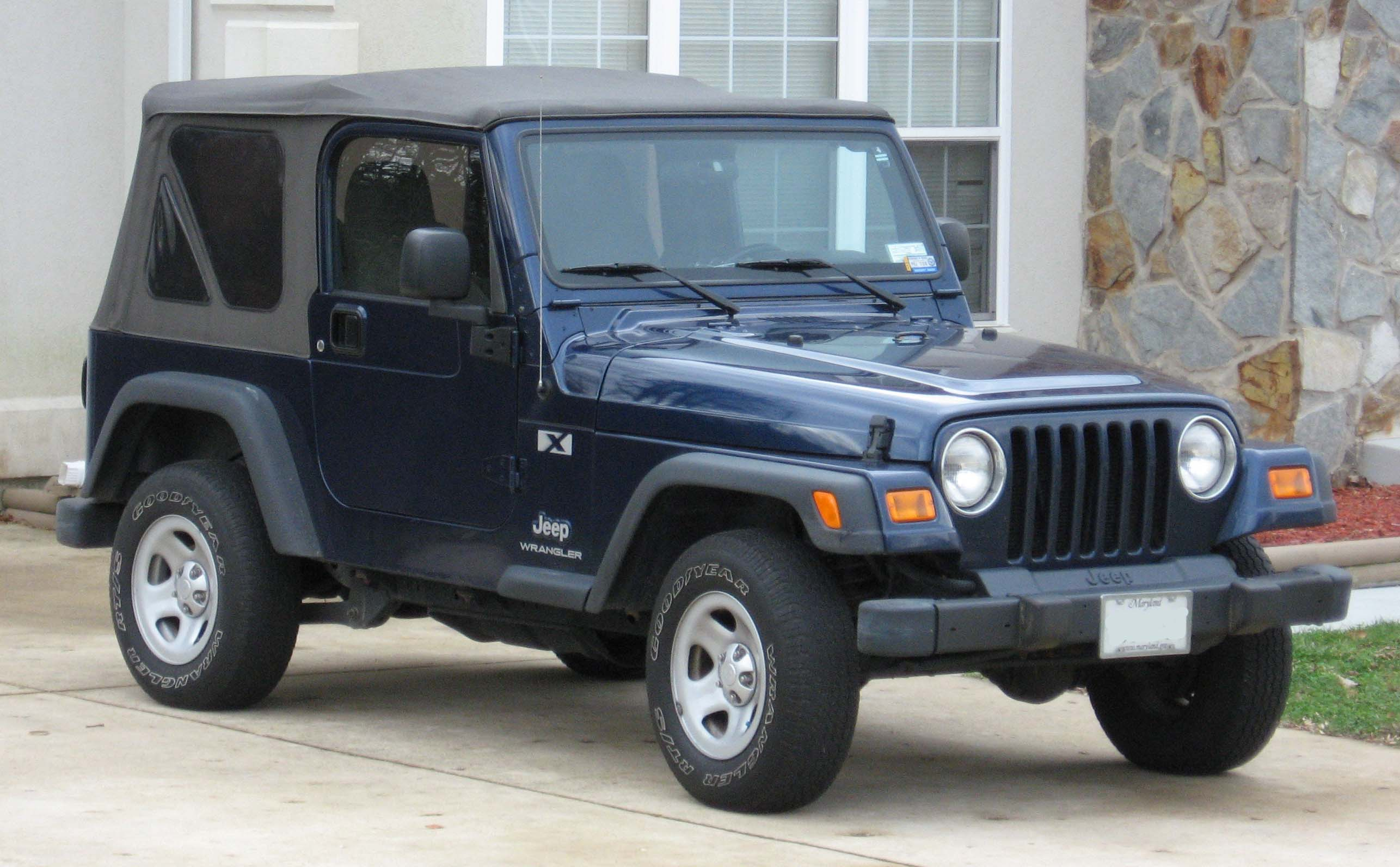

Overview
- Production: January 1996 – July 2006

Body and chassis
- Body style: 2-door convertible; 2-door SUV
- Related: AIL Storm II

Introduced in 1996 as a 1997 model, the second-generation Wrangler reintroduced the round headlamps from the classic Jeep models. The main engine was the AMC 242 4.0 L inline 6. From the Wrangler TJ onwards, all Wranglers were fitted with coil-spring instead of leaf-spring suspension, and the automatic shifter was relocated to the floor.

In 2004, a long-wheelbase "Unlimited" model was introduced. Furthermore, starting in 2006, Israeli Automotive Industries Ltd. produced the first five-door Jeep Wrangler derivative, built under license from Chrysler, for the Israel Defense Forces, based on a 2,931 mm (115.4 in) wheelbase Wrangler (TJ).

TJ-based long-wheelbase models

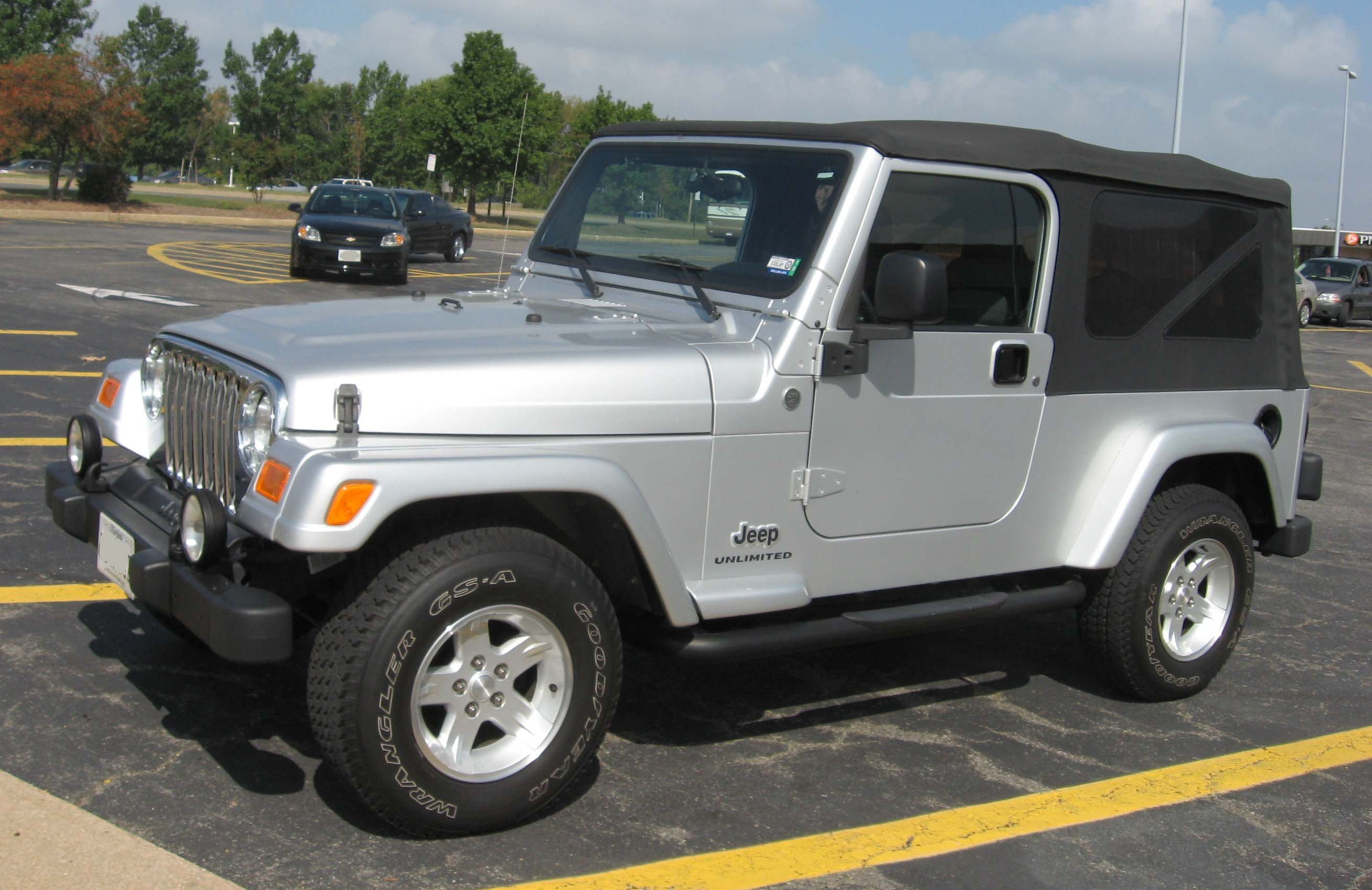
TJ Wrangler Unlimited, a plus 10 in (25 cm) LWB soft-top, as of 2004

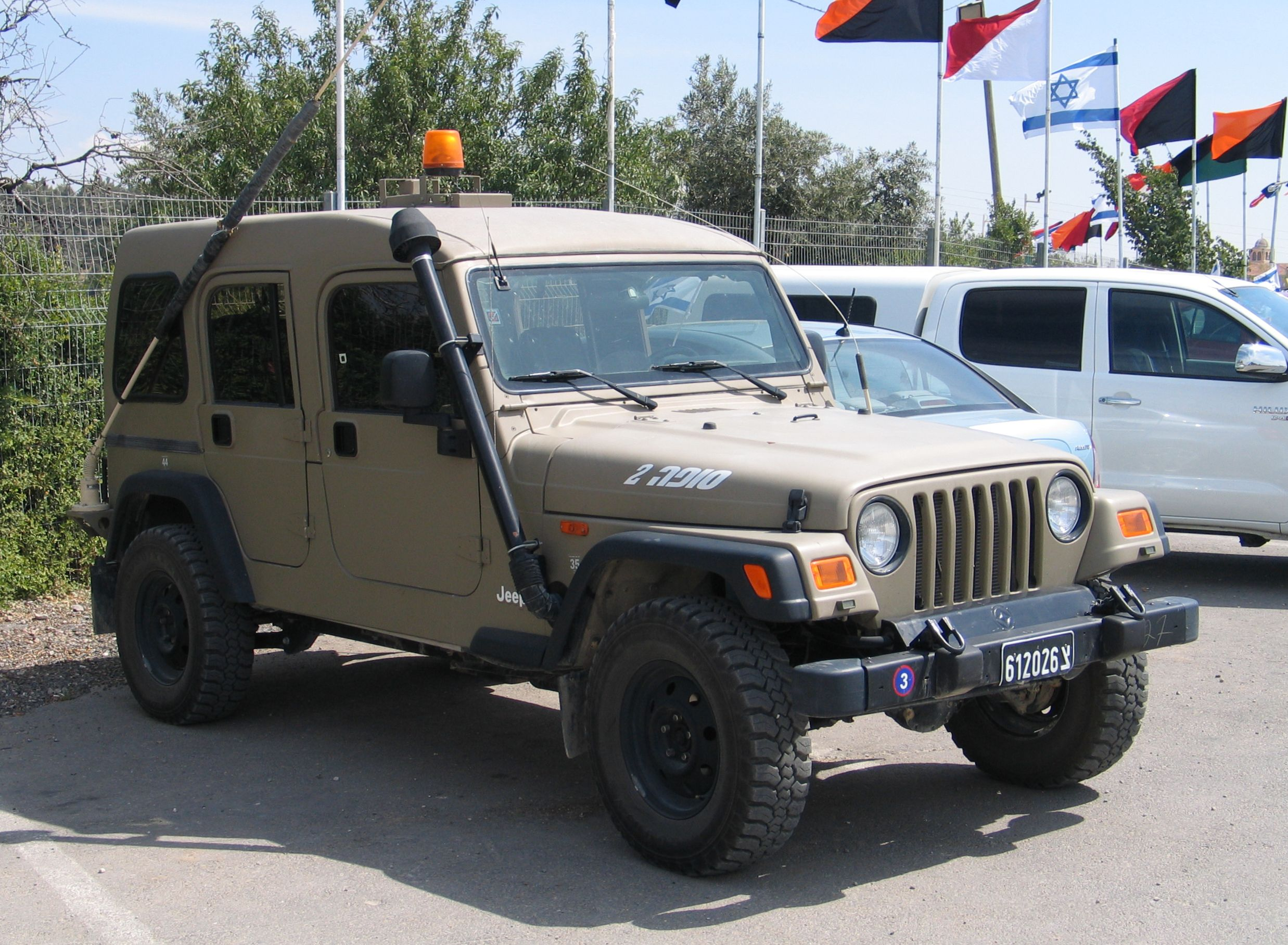
Israeli AIL Ltd. Storm II Commander

=== JK (2007) ===
JK
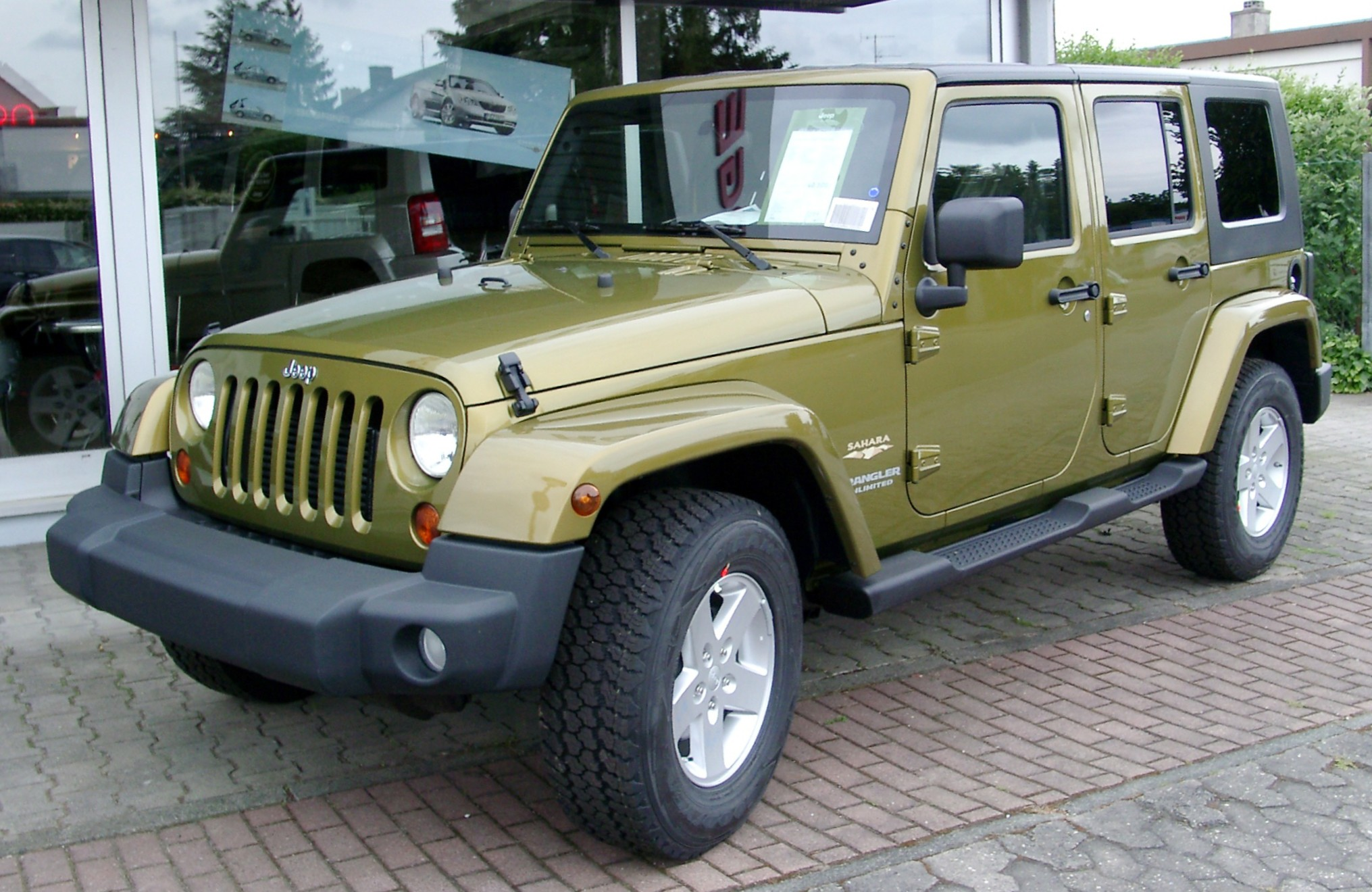
- Jeep Wrangler Unlimited Sahara (JK, Germany)

Overview
- Production: August 2006 – April 2018

Body and chassis
- Body style: 2-door convertible; 2-door SUV; 4-door convertible; 4-door SUV
- Related: Jeep J8

The third-generation Wrangler was released in 2006 for the 2007 model year. Developed under the ownership of DaimlerChrysler, the JK was Jeep's first Wrangler that was a completely clean-sheet design of the body, frame, and suspension. New features for the Wrangler included power windows, remote power door locks, navigation, as well as electronically detachable sway bars on some models.

Along with the traditional 2-door model, a 4-door "Unlimited" model was released, offering considerably more room, thanks to a more than 20 in (51 cm) longer wheelbase. These became quite successful sellers. By mid-2017, the four-door models represented three-quarters of all new Wranglers on the market.

On September 2, 2011, Jeep announced a partnership with Activision for the second year in a row, to make a special edition Modern Warfare 3 Jeep based on the Wrangler Rubicon model. The Jeep comes with various features, including the interior and exterior being designed with a Modern Warfare 3 theme. Jeep dealers started selling this model in November 2011.

=== JL (2018) ===
JL
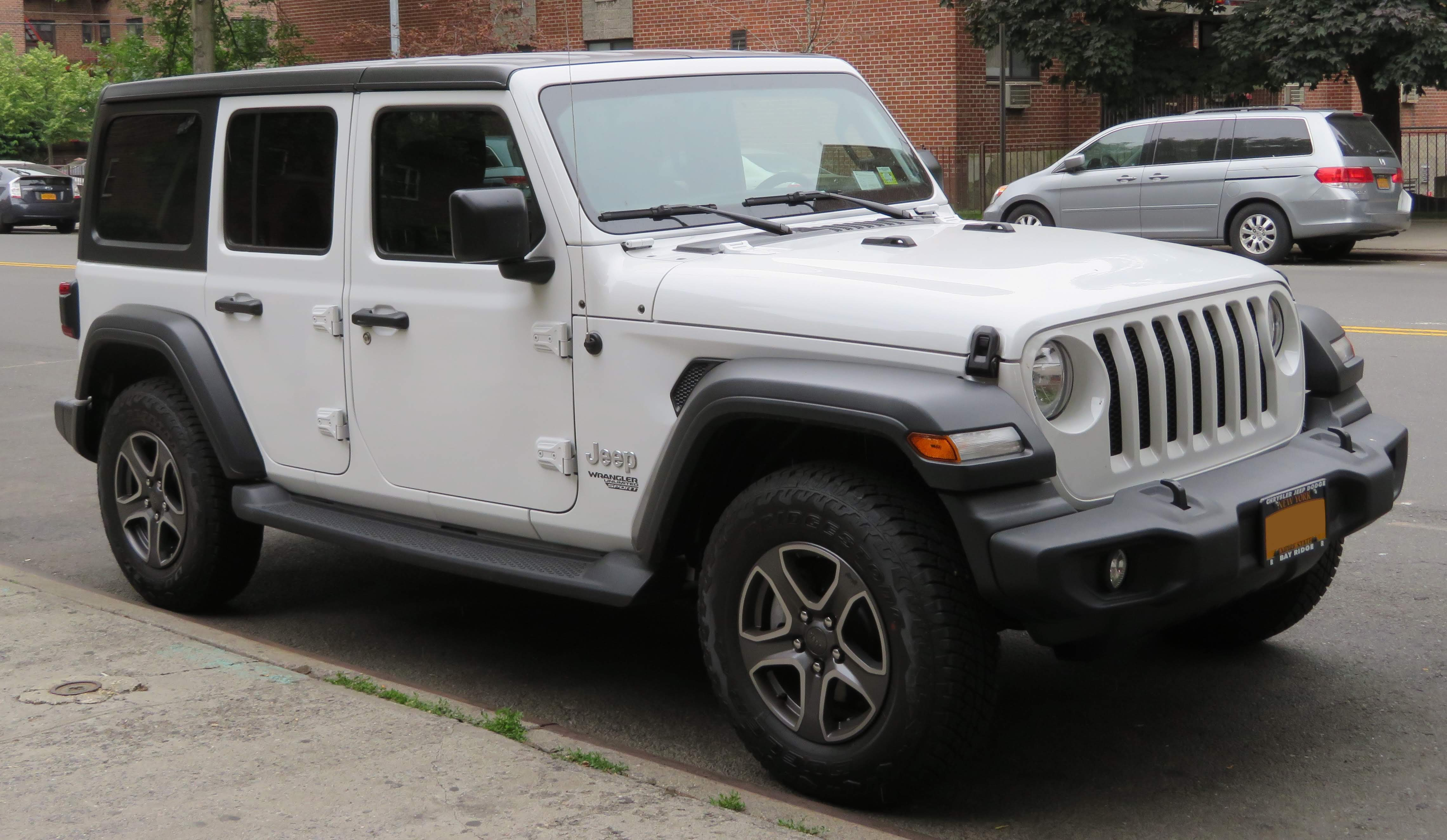
- Jeep Wrangler Unlimited Sport S

Overview
- Production: November 2017 – present

Body and chassis
- Body style: 2-door convertible; 2-door SUV; 4-door convertible; 4-door SUV; 4-door SUT

Dimensions
- Wheelbase: 96.8 in (2,459 mm) (2 door); 118.4 in (3,007 mm) (4 door)
- Length: 166.8 in (4,237 mm) (2 door); 188.4 in (4,785 mm) (4 door)
- Width: 73.8 in (1,875 mm)
- Height: 70.9–72.8 in (1,801–1,849 mm)
- Curb weight: 4,439 lb (2,013 kg) (Rubicon Unlimited)

The fourth-generation Wrangler was unveiled in late 2017 for the 2018 model year. The JL features additional powertrains over the Pentastar V6, a redesigned 8-speed automatic transmission, an easier fold-flat windshield, new zipperless soft tops, blind-spot monitoring, a backup camera, and a more modern interior. Powertrains for the 2018 models included a 2.0-liter turbocharged I4 making 270 hp (201 kW; 274 PS) and 295 lb⋅ft (400 N⋅m; 41 kg⋅m) of torque and the 3.6-liter Pentastar V6 gasoline engine making 285 hp (213 kW; 289 PS) and 260 lb⋅ft (353 N⋅m; 36 kg⋅m) of torque. Additionally, a 2.2-liter turbodiesel I4 was first available in Europe and since 2020 in North America with EcoDiesel engines. For the 2021 model year, Jeep introduced a plug-in hybrid version of the Wrangler, dubbed the Wrangler 4xe, that went on sale in early 2021. The Wrangler 4xe provides an estimated 25 miles (40 km) of all-electric range. In the third quarter of 2021, Jeep released the Rubicon 392 model, the most powerful JL ever produced. It comes with a 6.4L Hemi V8 that produces 470 hp (350 kW; 477 PS) and 470 lb⋅ft (637 N⋅m; 65 kg⋅m) of torque. This allows it to complete the quarter mile in 13.0 seconds, with 0-60 mph taking 4.5 seconds.

=== Electric Wrangler ===
In September 2008, Chrysler vice-chair Tom LaSorda unveiled a range-extended electric 4-door Wrangler along with a similarly engineered Town and Country minivan and a purely electric sports car. The Wrangler would have a 40-mile (64 km) range before a gas engine starts and begins supplying additional electricity. The 4xe has a 17 kWh battery with a usable capacity of 15 kWh and has an all-electric range of 21 mi (34 km) per charge. The 4xe is a plug-in Hybrid that takes advantage of Jeep's new 2.0-liter turbocharged 4-cylinder engine.

In early 2021, Jeep created the Magneto concept using a battery electric powertrain on a slightly modified Jeep JL two-door frame and body. The Magneto sports a JPP 2 in (51 mm) lift kit, 17-inch Lights Out black metallic wheels with 35 in (890 mm) mud-terrain tires, custom roll cage, Mopar Rock Rails, steel bumpers with a Warn winch, and a steel belly pan.

In April 2022, Jeep unveiled a new concept: the Wrangler Magneto 2.0. It includes a new electric powertrain calibration, which Jeep refers to as "electronic nitrous oxide" to maintain peak power for as long as 10 seconds. Rated at 625 horsepower and up to 850 lb⋅ft (1,150 N⋅m; 118 kg⋅m) of torque, the Magneto 2.0 is capable of 0–60 mph in 2 seconds.

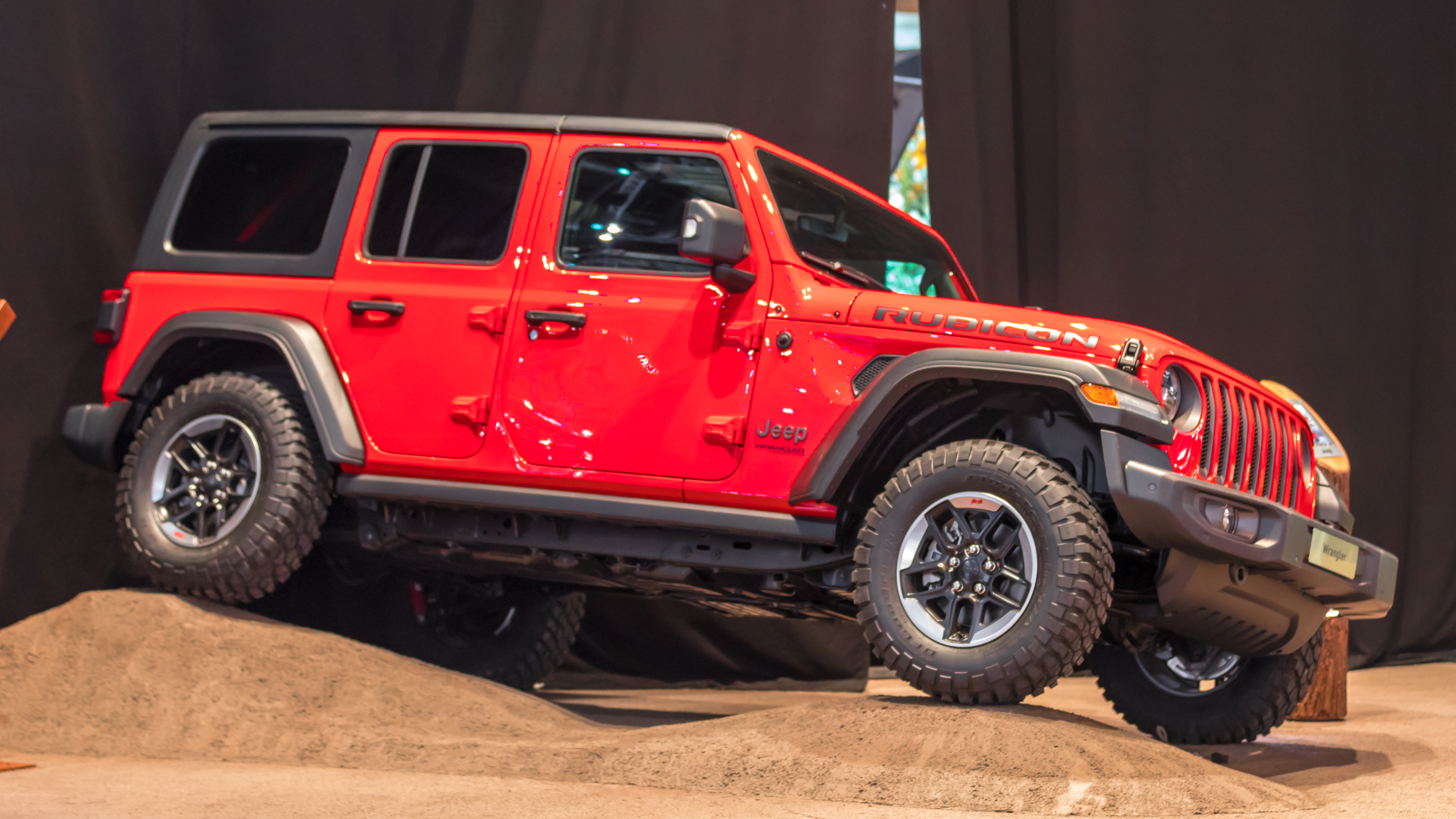
JL Rubicon (Geneva Int. Motor Show 2018)

== Recognition ==
The Jeep Wrangler received the 2009 Best Resale Value Award from Kelley Blue Book (KBB) in the sport utility vehicle category. In 2012 and for 2013, it was also awarded the Best Resale Value Award from Kelly Blue Book in the compact sport utility vehicle category. The Wrangler also holds the Models to Best Hold Its Value recognition from Kelley Blue Book for 1998, 1999, 2003, 2011, and 2012.

The 2011, 2012, and 2013 Jeep Wranglers have received Canadian Black Book's Best Retained Value Award for the compact SUV category.

In 2007, The Jeep Wrangler had set the Guinness World Record for the highest altitude attained by a four-wheeled vehicle after ferrying Matthias Jeschke and his Extreme Events adventure team up Chile's Ojos del Salado, the highest volcano on Earth (record reached the same year by a Suzuki Samurai). The trek from base camp to the world record height ran from March 7 to March 13, when the team's pair of Wrangler Rubicon Unlimiteds checked in at 6,646 metres (21,804 ft).

In 2007 and for 2013, the magazine Four Wheeler awarded the Jeep Wrangler with its Four-Wheeler of the Year Award and in January 2010, they awarded the Jeep Wrangler Unlimited Rubicon its title of 4x4 of the Decade.

In 1997, 2007, and 2012, the magazine Petersen's 4-Wheel & Off-Road awarded the Jeep Wrangler with its 4x4 of the Year award.

The 2008 edition of Forbes Autos lists the four-wheel-drive convertible Jeep Wrangler at number four among the top ten vehicles with the highest resale value.

In May 2009, Business Week magazine named the Wrangler One of the Most Iconic Cars of the Last 20 Years.

A 2018 iSeeCars.com study named the Jeep Wrangler as the vehicle with the lowest depreciation after five years.

== Sales ==
| Calendar year | United States | Canada | Europe | China | |
| Calendar year | United States | Canada | Europe | Wrangler | 4xe |
|---|---|---|---|---|---|
| 1997 | | | 4,732 | | |
| 1998 | | | 4,379 | | |
| 1999 | 89,174 | | 3,477 | | |
| 2000 | 82,254 | | 3,061 | | |
| 2001 | 68,831 | | 2,171 | | |
| 2002 | 64,351 | | 1,921 | | |
| 2003 | 70,093 | | 1,990 | | |
| 2004 | 77,550 | | 2,121 | | |
| 2005 | 79,017 | | 2,593 | | |
| 2006 | 80,271 | | 2,462 | | |
| 2007 | 119,243 | 9,834 | 6,612 | | |
| 2008 | 84,615 | 12,137 | 5,766 | | |
| 2009 | 82,044 | 7,271 | 3,469 | | |
| 2010 | 94,310 | 11,062 | 3,747 | | |
| 2011 | 122,460 | 15,636 | 6,829 | | |
| 2012 | 141,669 | 18,996 | 7,499 | | |
| 2013 | 155,502 | 18,578 | 5,619 | | |
| 2014 | 175,328 | 23,057 | 5,302 | | |
| 2015 | 202,702 | 20,880 | 6,059 | | |
| 2016 | 191,774 | 18,505 | 4,259 | | |
| 2017 | 190,522 | 17,296 | 3,670 | | |
| 2018 | 240,032 | 24,615 | 6,862 | | |
| 2019 | 228,032 | 25,659 | 7,522 | | |
| 2020 | 201,310 | 21,262 | 7,262 | | |
| 2021 | 204,609 | 20,026 | 8,723 | | |
| 2022 | 181,409 | 23,994 | 7,636 | | |
| 2023 | 156,581 | 19,102 | | 4,187 | 771 |
| 2024 | 151,163 | 14,219 | | 2,511 | 134 |
| 2025 | 167,322 | 12,952 | | 1,223 | 31 |

== See also ==
- Jeep Jamboree: Off Road Adventure – a video game based on the then-current Jeep Wrangler YJ model
