= NORRA =

NORRA may refer to:

- National Off-Road Racing Association
- Nordic Regional Airlines
