= Popular Hot Rodding =

American automotive magazine

- Categories: Automobile magazine
- Frequency: Monthly
- Total circulation: 111,958 (December 2011)
- Founded: 1962
- Final issue: September 2014
- Company: TEN: The Enthusiast Network
- Country: United States
- Based in: Anaheim, California
- Language: English
- Website: www.popularhotrodding.com
- ISSN: 0032-4523

Popular Hot Rodding was a monthly American automotive magazine from the Motor Trend Group, dedicated to high-performance automobiles, hot rods, and muscle cars. Though it focused primarily on vehicles produced from 1955 to the present day it maintained an emphasis on cars produced from the early 1960s through the mid 1970s.

The magazine's technical and feature articles (advertorials) showcased aftermarket and modified production parts and services, reviews, product announcements, news, and tuning tips. Popular Hot Rodding also covered high-profile events and the annual Engine Masters Challenge.

== History ==
Los Angeles-based Argus Publishers Corp. began publishing Popular Hot Rodding in early 1962. On May 29, 2014 Source Interlink Media announced that it would cease production of Popular Hot Rodding as part of the company's name change to TEN, The Enthusiast Network. The last printing of Popular Hot Rodding was the September 2014 issue. Their quarterly newsstand special issue (Engine Masters) which PHR once published, is currently published and distributed by Hot Rod Magazine. Some PHR articles which were published online also have been willed to hotrod.com.
