= 8-Lug HD Truck magazine =

8-Lug HD Truck magazine is a monthly print publication published by Source Interlink Media. The founding (and current) editor-in-chief is Bob Carpenter, who has been a magazine editor for 30 years. The headquarters is in Homestead, Florida.

== History ==
8-Lug HD Truck was first published in the Fall of 2006 with the intention of being a quarterly publication. After the first issue sold well, the schedule was increased to monthly. In 2010 the word "Diesel" in the title was replaced with "HD", in order to allow the magazine to show gas-powered heavy duty pickups. The magazine's main focus is on modified pickups (lifted, big wheels and tires, custom bumpers, billet grilles, etc.) and work trucks. Work trucks are usually owned by contractors and other small business owners who want to project an image of success, and coolness. 8-Lug does not currently have subscriptions but digital subs are available.
