= Motor Trend Group =

American automotive media company

Motor Trend Group, LLC
- Formerly: Source Interlink Media (2007–2014); TEN: The Enthusiast Network (2014–2018)
- Type: Subsidiary
- Industry: Mass media
- Founded: 2007; 19 years ago
- Headquarters: El Segundo, California, United States
- Products: Magazines
- Parent: Discovery, Inc. (2017–2022); Warner Bros. Discovery (2022–2024); Hearst Magazines (2024–present)
- Website: www.motortrendgroup.com

Motor Trend Group, LLC (formerly known as Source Interlink Media and TEN: The Enthusiast Network) is a media company that specializes in enthusiast brands, such as Motor Trend and Hot Rod. Headquartered in El Segundo, California, it was a subsidiary of the TNT Sports division of Warner Bros. Discovery (WBD) until being sold to Hearst Communications in 2024.

== History ==
Source Interlink logo

Source Interlink was an American magazine publishing and logistics company. It owned Source Interlink Distribution and Motor Trend Group. It maintained a strong position in automotive and action sports media, publishing a variety of magazines including Motor Trend, Hot Rod, and the Transworld titles.

In September 2012, it was announced that Source Interlink Media (SIM) made a strategic investment in San Francisco technology company CoverHound to power its insurance searches.

Through its GrindMedia action sports division, SIM signed a deal with the Bonnier Corporation in May 2013, where they sold Dirt Rider, Motorcyclist, Sport Rider, Motorcycle Cruiser, Hot Bike, Baggers, Super Streetbike, Street Chopper and ATV Rider, whereas they bought Sound + Vision and the suite of TransWorld brands.

On August 19, 2013, GrindMedia announced that production of Skateboarder will cease on October 15, 2013. The Skateboarder announcement was followed by the closure of other publications, such as Modified, Mini Truckin', Bound By Ink, GEEK, and Law of Attraction, in January 2014. Former Skateboarder editor-in-chief Jamie Owens was announced as the new editor-in-chief of TransWorld SKATEboarding in October 2013.

On May 29, 2014, Source Interlink CEO Michael L. Sullivan announced that its distribution arm would soon cease operations. Time, Inc. had withdrawn its business over the inability of Source Interlink Distribution to pay $19 million in revenues owed for second quarter 2014 sales and $7 million for sales booked in previous quarters. The publishing arm would be rebranded under the umbrella of TEN: The Enthusiast Network after shuttering several Source Interlink Media titles, including Popular Hot Rodding, Rod & Custom, High Performance Pontiac, Custom Classic Trucks, 4 Wheel Drive & Sport Utility, Mud Life, 5.0 Mustangs and Super Fords, Modified Mustangs & Fords, Camaro Performers, GM High-Tech Performance, Import Tuner, and Honda Tuning. In addition to editorial staff, there were further layoffs in art and production staff that was later explained by VPs and executives as needed cuts to keep TEN on a sustainable path since losing the large distribution arm of its core business to reach the claimed audience in its dwindling circulation and online presence.

In 2015, NBC Sports shuttered its action sports division, and sold the Dew Tour to TEN. On August 17 of that same year, TEN launched its subscription video on demand service Motor Trend OnDemand, which was the first SVOD service aimed at automotive enthusiasts. TEN CEO Scott Dickey described this community as "underserved and starved for premium video content" while positioning the SVOD service as "The Netflix for Gearheads."

In 2017, TEN sold the AMA EnduroCross Championship to the Bonnier Motorcycle Group. TEN also sold Baseball America and Slam.

On August 3, 2017, Discovery Communications announced it would acquire a majority stake in TEN, and contribute its automotive-oriented cable network Velocity into the company. The venture's goal is to create a larger, multi-platform presence for the company's brands, with a particular emphasis on direct-to-consumer streaming products. On April 10, 2018, it was announced that the company had been renamed Motor Trend Group effective immediately, and that Velocity would be rebranded under the Motor Trend name later in the year.

In March 2018, the company sold Sound & Vision and Stereophile, along with related magazines and websites, to AVTech Media Ltd. In February 2019, the company sold its adventure sports portfolio to American Media. In December 2019, the company announced that 19 of the 22 magazines published by the company would be discontinued that month, including Automobile.

In December 2024, Warner Bros. Discovery sold the Motor Trend Group and most of its assets to Hearst Communications. The sale included MotorTrend, Hot Rod, Roadkill and Automobile.

== Titles ==
=== Publications and digital assets ===
- Hot Rod
- Motor Trend

=== Video on demand and broadcasting ===
Former broadcasting and streaming services are retained by Warner Bros. Discovery.

== Former titles ==
- Motor Trend+ (subscription streaming service) – discontinued 2024, most subscribers transferred to Discovery+
- Four Wheeler – ceased publication 2023
- Roadkill – ceased publication as magazine 2018 and the web show will finish in 2025

=== Earlier discontinuations ===
- 8-Lug HD Truck magazine – ceased publication 2015
- Audiostream – ceased publication 2018
- Bound by Ink – ceased publication 2014
- Canoe & Kayak – ceased publication 2017
- Circle Track – ceased publication 2018
- Dirt Sports + Off-Road – ceased publication 2018
- European Car- ceased publication 2018
- Geek- ceased publication 2014
- Innerfidelity – ceased publication 2018
- Intellichoice – ceased publication 2012
- Law of Attraction Magazine – ceased publication 2013
- Mini Truckin- ceased publication 2014
- Off-Road- ceased publication 2019
- Petersen’s PHOTOgraphic – ceased publication 2013
- Petersen's 4-Wheel & Off-Road – ceased publication 2019
- Shutterbug – sold and ceased publication 2019
- Snowboarder – sold and ceased publication 2020
- Surfer – sold and ceased publication 2019
- Surfing Magazine – ceased publication 2017
- TransWorld Business- sold and ceased publication 2019
- TransWorld Motocross- sold and ceased publication 2019
- TransWorld Ride BMX – sold and ceased publication 2019
- TransWorld SKATEboarding- sold and ceased publication 2019
- TransWorld SNOWboarding – sold and ceased publication 2019

=== December 2019 discontinuations ===
- Automobile
- Car Craft
- Chevy High Performance
- Classic Trucks
- Diesel Power Magazine
- Hot Rod Deluxe
- Jp
- Lowrider
- Mopar Muscle
- Muscle Car Review
- Mustang Monthly
- Street Rodder
- Super Chevy
- Super Street
- Truck Trend
- Truckin' Magazine
- Petersen's 4-Wheel & Off-Road
- Vette
- Muscle Mustangs & Fast Fords

=== 2020 discontinuations ===
- Bike – sold & ceased publication 2020
- Powder – sold & ceased publication 2020
- SUP Stand Up Paddler – sold & ceased publication 2020

== Advertising ==
- And1 Merchandise

== See also ==
- Fausto Vitello
