= Ed Pearlman =

Ed Pearlman is a co-founder (together with Don Francisco) of the National Off-Road Racing Association (1966), the first exclusively off-road racing organization, and its first president. The inaugurating event of NORRA was "Mexican 1000 Rally", which has become the Baja 1000. In 1978, he established the Off-Road Motorsports Hall of Fame.

Pearlman is an ex-Marine and prior to founding of NORRA he was a florist in San Fernando Valley and a four-wheel-drive buff on weekends.
