= Four Wheeler =

Automobile magazine

- Cover of the final issue (February 2023)
- Categories: Automobile magazine
- Frequency: Monthly
- Founder: Robert Ames
- Founded: 1962
- First issue: February 1962
- Final issue: February 2023
- Company: Motor Trend Group
- Country: US
- Based in: El Segundo, California
- Language: English

Four Wheeler was a magazine for 4×4 SUVs and off-road truck enthusiasts, with the first issue being published in February 1962. Four Wheeler focused on new vehicles, project vehicles, technical aspects of assembling a vehicle, product tests, outdoor equipment and machines, 4x4 shows and competitions, and travel.

Four Wheeler was published monthly by the Motor Trend Group and was headquartered in El Segundo, California.

The magazine ceased publication after February 2023 issue.

== Top Truck Challenge ==
The first Four-Wheeler Top Truck Challenge (TTC) took place in 1993 and was held annually at the Hollister Hills State Vehicular Recreation Area near Hollister, California, until June 2015. The concept of the challenge was to test the engineering capabilities of 4x4 vehicles nominated by the magazine's readers.

Competitors were selected by Four-Wheeler readers, although that process didn’t begin until 1995. Starting with the 2004 Top Truck Challenge, competition vehicles were no longer required to be street-legal. Over time, the challenges included an obstacle course, a mini Rubicon Trail, and the Tank Trap. In 2012, Four-Wheeler held the first Top Truck Champions' Challenge, pitting past Top Truck Challenge Grand Champions against one another. Segments from the Top Truck Challenge have been broadcast on Outdoor Channel.

== Four Wheeler of the Year and Pickup Truck of the Year ==
Each year, the magazine gives two awards voted on by the editors to automakers of new 4x4s: Four Wheeler of the Year and Pickup Truck of the Year. The competition began in 1974 with the Four Wheeler Achievement Award, given to the 1974 Jeep Cherokee.

In 1989, pickup trucks were separated into their own contest. In 2012, Motor Trend featured a behind-the-scenes look at the Four Wheeler of the Year and Pickup Truck of the Year competitions in an episode of The Downshift on Motor Trend. In 2017, the Four Wheeler of the Year award was renamed SUV of the Year.

Vehicles are evaluated in categories such as off-road performance, highway performance, mechanical and empirical data, along with interior and exterior features. The competition typically takes place in southern California and covers approximately 1,000 miles both on- and off-road, with vehicles being scored by experienced judges.

In 2020, Jeep won both SUV of the Year and Pickup Truck of the Year. No manufacturer had previously won both awards in the same year.

== Owners ==
- 1962-1971: Robert Ames
- 1971-1986: Jack Pelzer
- 1986-1999: General Media
- 1999-2001: EMAP plc
- 2001-2007: Primedia Inc.
- 2007-1017: Source Interlink
- 2014-2018: TEN: The Enthusiast Network
- 2018-2023: Motor Trend Group

== Books ==
- Four Wheeler Chassis & Suspension Handbook (2004) (ISBN 9780760318157)
