= National Off-Road Racing Association =

Desert off-road racing association

The National Off-Road Racing Association (usually abbreviated NORRA) is a desert off-road racing association.

== History ==
It was founded in 1967 by Ed Pearlman and Don Francisco. At the time it was the first racing sanctioning body devoted solely to off-road racing. The first event, the Mexican 1000 (1967), began in Tijuana, went through Ensenada, and finished in La Paz. This first event laid the groundwork of vehicle classes and rules that shaped off-road racing in Baja for the next 40 years. The involvement of the Mexican government and other issues eventually lead to NORRA no longer hosting the races and SCORE International took over and the event became the Baja 1000. After that NORRA was defunct for several years.

In 2010, NORRA returned to the Baja California Peninsula. The race again was called the Mexican 1000, although with a different flavor and structure. The race was now run in a rally style, with special stages and transit sections, and is focused on historic racing vehicles. Racing vehicles must be motorcycles and automobiles from prior to 1998.

In 2011, NORRA added an "alternative fuel" racing class including diesel, electric, ethanol, propane, etc. which allowed modern racing vehicles to participate. The door to modern vehicles was opened all the way in 2012 with the introduction of the "Evolution" category. Robby Gordon and Clyde Stacy were the first winner of this new category.

A small section of the Mexican 1000 was featured in the seminal motorcycling film On Any Sunday. There, famous rider Malcolm Smith is shown racing through Baja desert.
