= Desert racing =

Racing through desert in an off-road vehicle

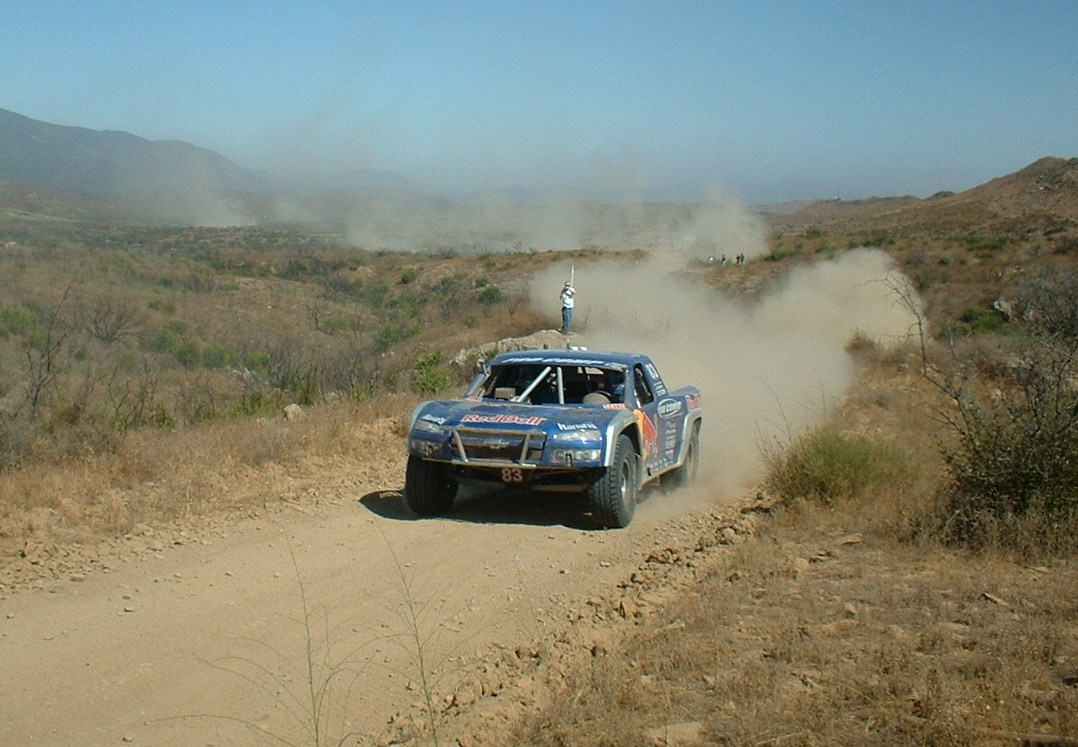
A trophy truck in a desert race (2006)

Desert racing is the act of racing through the desert in a two- or four-wheeled off-road vehicle. Races, which generally consist of two or more loops around a course covering up to 4,660 miles (7,500 km), can take the form of Hare and Hound or Hare scramble style events, and are often laid out over a long and harsh track through relatively barren terrain.

Point-to-point–style races, including the famous Mint 400 and Baja 1000, attract nationally ranked and celebrity drivers. This type of racing tests the endurance and capabilities of racer and machine, and while organized clubs or teams sometimes field multiple sponsored riders for particular events, desert racing in its purest form is largely an individual endeavor. Winning racers accrue points to advance their rank and placement in future contests.

Desert racing vehicles, which include rugged enduro-style motorcycle, four wheeled all-terrain vehicles, trucks (like Group T4), pickup trucks (like Trophy Trucks), and dune buggies, have specialized suspensions with increased wheel travel. The now-defunct Barstow to Vegas, which was held in the Mojave Desert from 1967 to 1975 and 1983 to 1989, was a well-known example of desert racing in North America. Desert racing, in its most organized form, began in Southern California in the 1920s.

The sport has also seen rapid developments in other countries. In Pakistan, the Cholistan Desert Rally began in 2005, with more than 100 drivers in the 2018 event won by Mir Nadir Ali Khan Magsi.

== See also ==
- Off-road racing
- Dakar Rally
- Finke Desert Race
- Budapest-Bamako
- Cholistan Desert Rally
