= Rent Group =

American media company

- Formerly: K-III Communications (1989–1997); PriMedia (1997–2013); RentPath (2013-2022)
- Company type: Subsidiary
- Founded: 1989; 37 years ago
- Founder: Bill Reilly
- Headquarters: Atlanta, Georgia, United States
- Key people: Jon Zigler (CEO)
- Parent: Rocket Mortgage
- Website: www.rent.com

Rent Group Inc., stylized as Rent., is a media company that owns Rent.com, ApartmentGuide.com, Lovely, and Rentals.com. It was previously called K-III (1989–1997), PriMedia (1997–2013), and RentPath (2013-2022).

The company at one time owned over 200 magazines, including Chicago and New York, as well as Automobile, Truckin' Magazine, Soap Opera Digest, Soap Opera Weekly, Seventeen, and Weekly Reader.

== History ==
=== Foundation as K-III ===
The company, initially called K-III Communications Corporation, was founded in 1989 by Kohlberg Kravis Roberts and Macmillan Inc. president Bill Reilly, as a platform to buy media properties. Its first acquisitions were Macmillan's Book Clubs, Gryphon Editions (renamed Newbridge Communications), and Intertec Publishing; and Maxwell Communications Corporation's Webb Publishing.

In 1990, K-III acquired Ward's from Thomson Corporation It also acquired the business publications of Andrews Communications; Readers Garden, operator of special interest book clubs; and Weekly Reader and Funk & Wagnalls from Marshall Field V.

In 1991, it acquired nine magazines from News Corporation for $600 million: Daily Racing Form, Soap Opera Digest, Soap Opera Weekly, New York, Seventeen, Premiere, European Travel & Life, Automobile, and New Woman.

In 1992, it acquired medical publisher Krames from Grolier, and Films for the Humanities & Sciences.

In 1993, it acquired three magazines from Wiesner, and The World Almanac from E. W. Scripps Company.

In 1994, K-III acquired Stagebill; Gibbs College; Haas Publishing (now Consumer Source Inc.), publisher of Apartment Guide; and PJS Publications.

=== Going public ===
In 1995, the company became a public company via an initial public offering, selling 15 million shares at $12 per share in a deal that left Kohlberg Kravis Roberts with control of 82.2% of the company's shares. It also acquired the US trade magazine operations of Maclean-Hunter, Chicago from Landmark Media Enterprises, and McMullen & Yee Publishing, a publisher of automotive magazine.

In 1996, the company acquired 14 publications from Cahners Consumer Magazines, Pro Football Weekly, and Westcott Communications, later renamed Primedia Workplace Learning.

In 1997, the company acquired Farm Press, Park Avenue Publishing, publisher of Lowrider, and Intellichoice. It also sold Krames to the Times Mirror Company, sold New Woman to Rodale, Inc., and sold Gibbs College to Career Education Corporation.

=== Rebranding as Primedia; shift away from print ===
On November 18, 1997, the company changed its name to Primedia to more clearly focus on its core business.

In 1998, the company acquired the Cowles Enthusiast Media and Cowles Business Media divisions of Cowles Media Company from McClatchy Newspapers for $200 million. It sold Daily Racing Form to private investors, sold Stagebill to Fred B. Tarter, sold Newbridge Communications to Doubleday Direct, and acquired Sterling/MacFadden's teen magazines and teen publisher Laufer Publishing.

In 1999, as the company's stock remained moribund, it sold its education unit (Weekly Reader, The World Almanac) to Ripplewood Holdings, acquired Multimedia Publishing, and sold Better Nutrition, Southwest Art, and Vegetarian Times to Sabot Publishing.

In 2000, the company acquired About.com for $690 million.

In January 2001, as part of a joint venture, Primedia handed over editorial control of its trade publications that reported on the media industry to Steven Brill. Later that year, the company acquired EMAP's U.S. magazines and closed Country Journal. In October 2001, Primedia dissolved its partnership with Brill.

In 2002, the company sold Modern Bride to Condé Nast Publications, sold Pro Football Weekly to Arkush family, sold Chicago to Tribune Company, and sold American Baby to Meredith Corporation.

In 2003, the company sold Volleyball, Teddy Bear and Friends and Doll Reader to Ashton International Media, sold Seventeen to Hearst Corporation for $182.4 million, sold New York to Bruce Wasserstein for $55 million, sold Tiger Beat and Bop to Laufer Media, sold Kitplanes to Belvoir Publications, and sold Simba Information to R.R. Bowker.

In 2004, the company sold Folio and Circulation Management to a joint venture with Red 7 Media.

In 2005, the company sold About.com to The New York Times Company for $410 million, sold Prism Business Media (ex-Intertec) to private investors Wasserstein & Co. (later merged with Penton Media), and sold Ward's to Prism Business Media.

In 2006, the company was publishing over 280 separate magazine titles. That year, it sold history magazines to Weider History Group, sold Crafts Group to Sandler Capital Management for $132 million, and sold Outdoor Group to InterMedia Partners

In 2007, the company sold a group of 17 outdoor-oriented magazines to InterMedia Outdoors for $170 million in cash, in a deal that included Guns & Ammo and Fly Fisherman. It also sold its Enthusiast Media division to Source Interlink, controlled by Ronald Burkle, in a deal that netted Primedia $1.15 billion in cash in exchange for a group of more than 70 magazines, including Motor Trend and Soap Opera Digest and 90 consumer websites. The deal left Primedia to focus on a series of free print and online consumer guides published by its Consumer Source unit. It also sold Gems group to Interweave, sold Climbing to Skram Media, sold Films for the Humanities & Sciences to Infobase Publishing, and sold Channel One News to Alloy Media and Marketing.

In 2008, the company sold South Florida Auto Guide and Wisconsin Auto Guide to Target Media Partners and closed Atlanta Auto Guide.

In 2009, the company closed Today's Custom Home.

=== Acquisition by TPG Capital and shift toward real estate ===
In 2011, TPG Capital bought Primedia for $525 million, taking the company private and delisting it from the New York Stock Exchange. In 2012, Primedia acquired rent.com from eBay.

In 2013, the company changed its name to RentPath. In 2014 it acquired Lovely for $13 million.

In 2014, Providence Equity Partners LLC acquired 50% of the company.

In July 2015, former CEO of Autotrader.com, Chip Perry, was named president and CEO of RentPath. He succeeded Charles Stubbs, who remained on the RentPath board of directors. In November 2015, Chip Perry stepped down as president and CEO of RentPath, to take over as CEO of TrueCar.

RentPath named Marc P. Lefar as President and CEO on April 4, 2016.

=== Bankruptcy ===
In February 2020, RentPath filed bankruptcy in preparation for acquisition by CoStar, which reached an agreement to acquire RentPath for $588 million.

In December 2020, the company terminated the acquisition by CoStar.

In April 2021, RentPath was acquired by Redfin for $608 million.

In June 2022, it changed its name to Rent Group, stylized as "Rent.".

== Former notable magazine titles ==
- Folio (1998–2004)
- Modern Bride
- Weekly Reader (1990–1999)

=== Action sports ===
- Bike Magazine
- Bodyboarding Magazine
- Box Inline Skate Magazine
- Canoe & Kayak Magazine
- Climbing (TK–2007)
- Fly Fisherman
- Guns & Ammo (2001–2007)
- Powder Magazine
- Pro Football Weekly (1996–2002)
- Sail Magazine
- Skateboarder (2001–2007)
- Slam (2001–2007)
- Snowboarder Magazine (2001–2007)
- Surfer (2001–2007)
- Surfing Magazine (2001–2007)
- Volleyball

=== Automotive ===
- 4 Wheel Drive & Sport Utility Magazine
- Atlanta Auto Guide
- Automobile (1991–2007)
- Car Craft
- Dirt Rider
- Four Wheeler
- Hot Bike
- Hot Rod (2001–2007)
- Jp
- Lowrider (1999–2007)
- Mini Truckin Magazine
- Modified Magazine
- Mopar Muscle Magazine
- Motorcyclist
- Motor Trend
- Mustang Monthly
- Petersen's 4-Wheel & Off-Road
- Power & Motoryacht
- Project Car Tuner Magazine
- South Florida Auto Guide
- Sport Compact Car
- Sport Truck
- Super Street
- Truckin' Magazine (1995–2007)
- Truck Trend
- Wisconsin Auto Guide

=== Entertainment ===
- Premiere (1991–1995)
- Soap Opera Digest (1991–2007)
- Soap Opera Weekly (1991–2007)
- Stagebill (1994–1998)

=== Enthusiast ===
- Doll Reader (1998–2002)
- Home Theater
- Kitplanes
- Southwest Art
- Stereophile (2001–2007)
- Teddy Bear and Friends

=== Equestrian ===
- Arabian Horse World
- Daily Racing Form
- Dressage Today
- EQUUS (1998–2007)
- Horse & Rider
- Practical Horseman (1998–2007)

=== Lifestyle ===
- Chicago (1995–2002)
- Country Journal (1998–2001)
- European Travel & Life
- New Woman (1991–1997)
- New York (1991–2003)
- Today's Custom Home

=== Teen ===
- Bop (1998–2003)
- Seventeen (1991–2003)
- Teen (2000–2002)
- Tiger Beat (1998–2003)

=== Wellness ===
- Better Nutrition
- Vegetarian Times (1997–1999)
