= R. John Wright Dolls =

Art doll making workshop

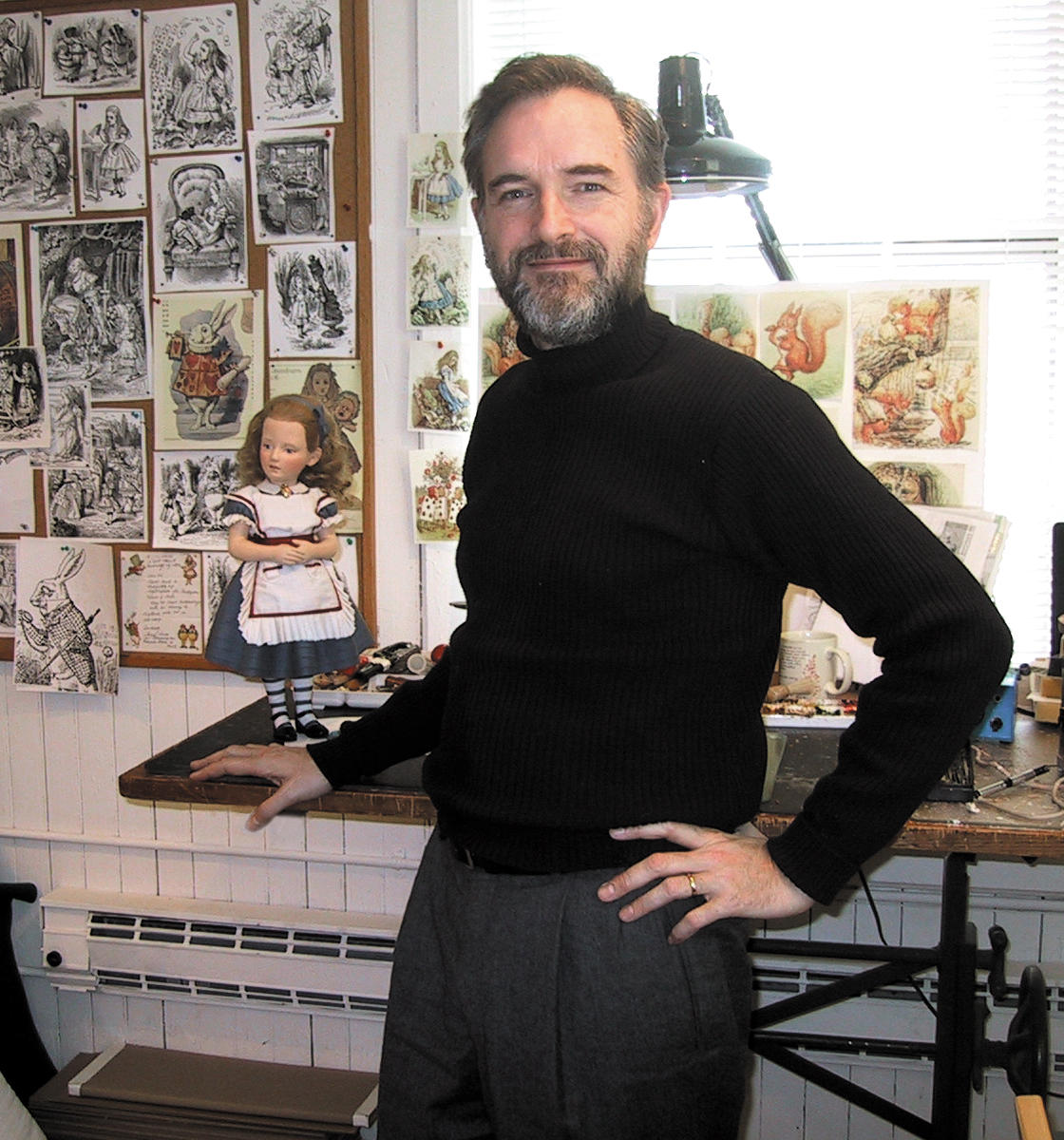
- R. John Wright in his home studio in Cambridge, NY, 2005
- Company type: Private
- Industry: Doll/Toy Manufacture
- Founded: 1976, Brattleboro, Vermont
- Founders: R. John Wright & Susan Wright
- Headquarters: Bennington, Vermont
- Area served: Worldwide
- Services: Design and Production of Limited Edition Molded Felt Dolls and Plush Animals
- Website: http://www.rjohnwright.com

R. John Wright Dolls is an American art doll making workshop located in Bennington, Vermont. Established in 1976, it is a privately held company founded by R. John Wright.

The company designs, produces and markets original felt doll and plush animal lines along with many licensed products including Winnie-the-Pooh, Raggedy Ann, Beatrix Potter characters, Disney characters, Paddington Bear, and The Wizard of Oz. The dolls are designed by John and Susan Wright and produced in numbered limited editions at their workshop.

== History ==
R. John Wright was born and raised in Michigan, where he attended Wayne State University and worked towards a degree in Liberal Arts. Two years later, after he had relocated to New England, he met his wife Susan who had a degree in Fine Arts from the University of New Hampshire. In November 1976, while living in Brattleboro, Vermont, R. John Wright created his first felt doll in the image of a simple male folk character. Production commenced at the couple's ground-floor apartment. These early dolls were primarily sold at juried craft fairs along the East Coast, including the American Craft Council (ACC) exhibitions in Rhinebeck, New York. The technique and style of the R. John Wright dolls underwent significant changes throughout 1977–78. The early felt dolls of the Steiff Company were a strong inspiration. The Wrights were also inspired by the early molded cloth dolls of Kathe Kruse and the felt Lenci dolls. In 1978, through trial and error, they developed techniques that reinvented the art of molded felt dolls.

In 1978, R. John Wright joined the United Federation of Doll Clubs and was elected to the National Institute of American Doll Artists, where he served as the standards chairman of the organization.

In 1981, the R. John Wright facility relocated from Brattleboro, Vermont to Cambridge, New York.

Beginning in 1987, every R. John Wright item features an 8 mm brass identification button inscribed with the initials 'RJW.'

In 2005 the R. John Wright facility relocated from Cambridge, New York to Bennington, Vermont. All work continues to be done on site under the Wrights' direct supervision.

== Disney Editions ==
In 1984 R. John Wright Inc. began a 13-year relationship with the Walt Disney Company with the development of a range of dolls based closely on the original illustrations by E. H. Shepard in the Winnie-the-Pooh books by A. A. Milne. These products ushered in a new licensing division titled “Classic Winnie-the-Pooh”, which was a departure in Disney's marketing of Winnie-the-Pooh products in the U.S. Several editions of Winnie-the-Pooh and other characters from the Hundred Acre Wood were produced.

Under license with Disney, the R. John Wright company went on to produce many Disney art character dolls including Mickey Mouse, Minnie Mouse, Cinderella, Pinocchio, Geppetto, and Snow White and the Seven Dwarfs. The Snow White and the Seven Dwarfs set won the company the Award of Excellence from DOLLS Magazine in 1998.

== Licensed items ==
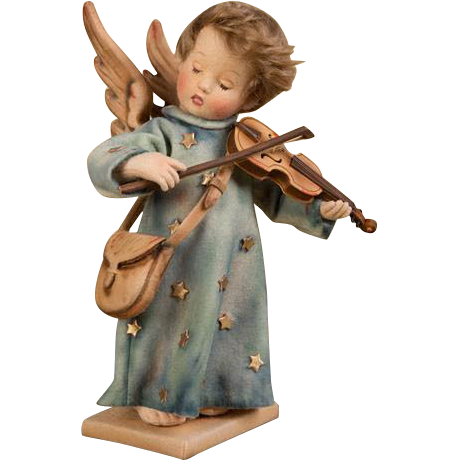
R. John Wright Hummel Celestial Holiday Angel Musician

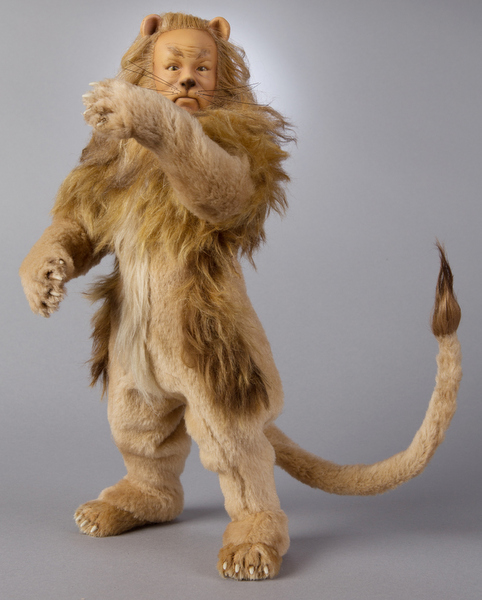
The Cowardly Lion by R. John Wright

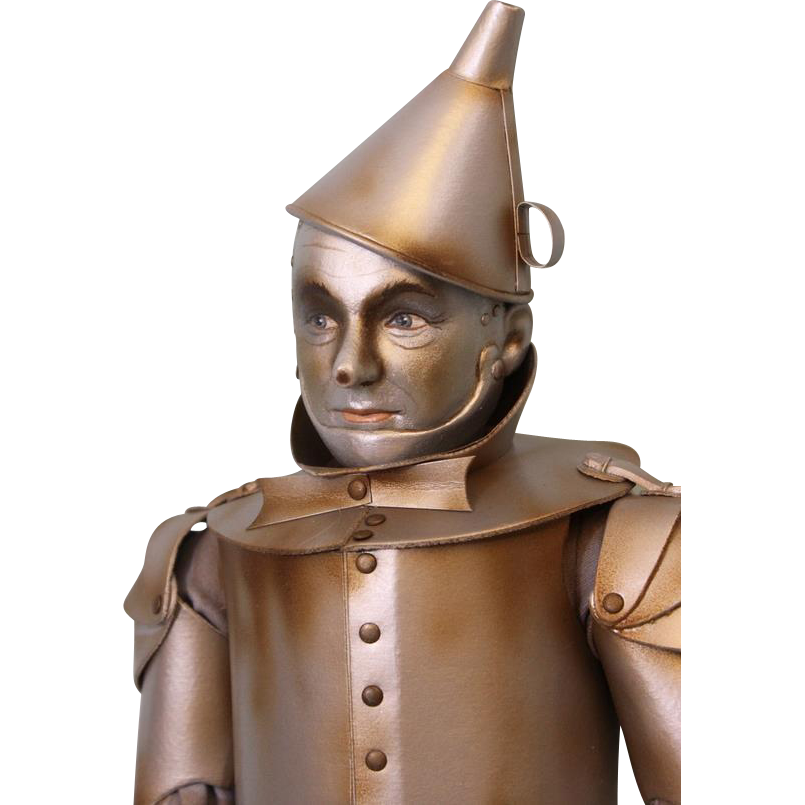
The Tin Man from The Wizard of Oz, R. John Wright, 2015

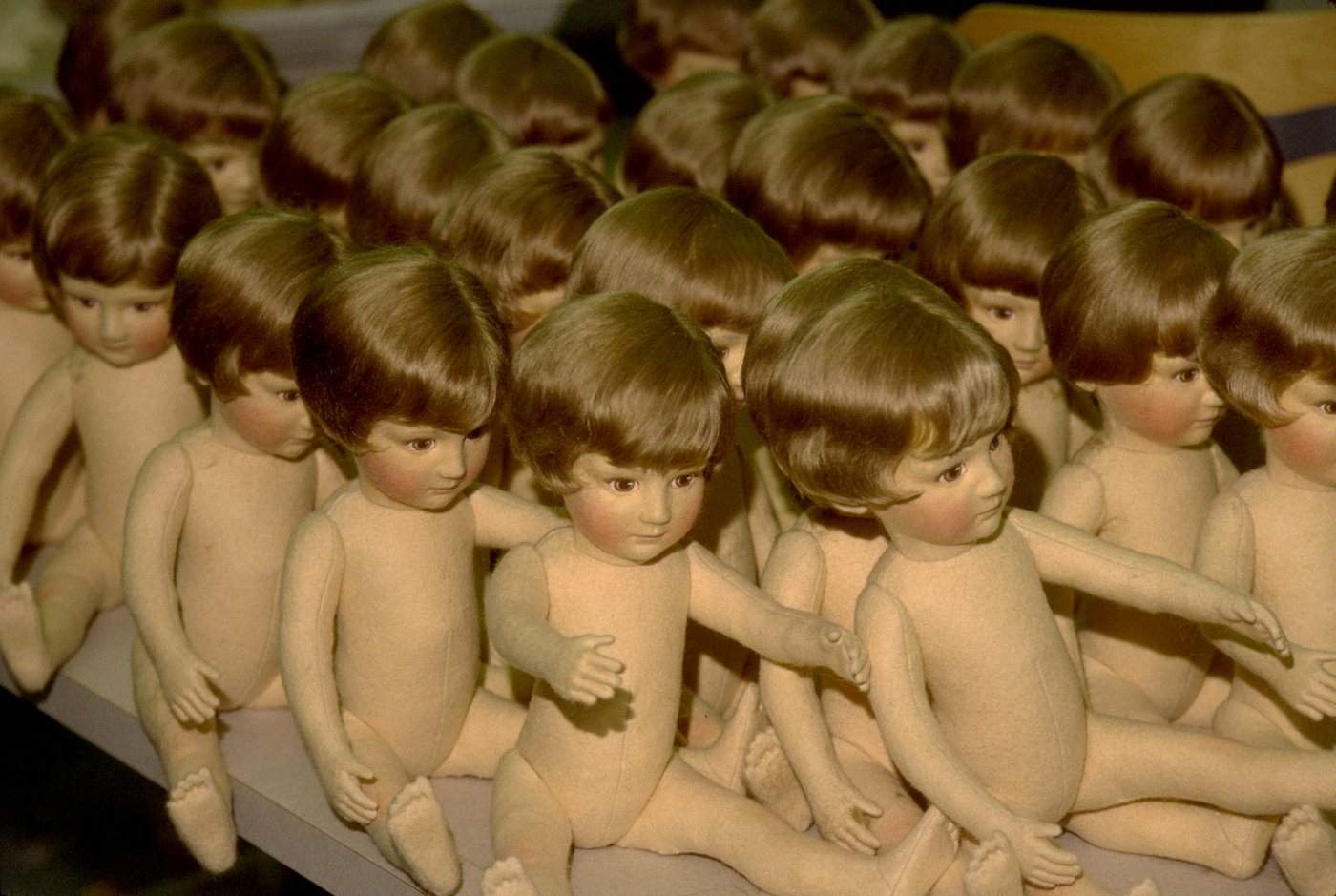
Felt Christopher Robin dolls in production at the R. John Wright workshop circa 1987.

- 1984-1999: R. John Wright (RJW) was under license from the Walt Disney Company for collectible dolls and plush. In 1985 the company received the first Doll of the Year Award from Doll Reader magazine for its rendition of Christopher Robin and Winnie-the-Pooh.
- 1999: RJW was licensed to produce Rose O'Neill's Kewpie in felt. Production coincided with an extensive RJW tour and exhibition at the Takashimaya department store in Japan.
- 2000-2008: RJW secured licensing to produce the Beatrix Potter Collection with the introduction of Peter Rabbit and a series of animal characters from the Beatrix Potter books.
- 2000-2002: three editions of The Little Prince were produced under license from the estate of Antoine de Saint-Exupéry, including a one-of-a-kind figure that traveled the world from January 2001 to January 2002 and was sold by the doll auction house Theriault's for $35,000 with proceeds going to St. Jude's Children's Research.
- 2000-2002: RJW produced several editions of Paddington Bear under license from the Copyrights Group.
- 2002: RJW produced the Clifford Berryman Bear under license from Linda Mullins to commemorate the centennial anniversary of the teddy bear.
- 2004-2008: RJW was licensed by the Copyrights Group to produce Raggedy Ann and other related characters created by Johnny Gruelle.
- 2006: the French comic character Becassine was produced with permission from the copyright holder and publisher, Gautier-Languereau/Hachette Jeunesse.
- 2007-2008: RJW and the Steiff Company in Germany collaborated on a series of felt child dolls titled 'Steiff Kinder.'
- 2007: the 50th anniversary of Edith The Lonely Doll by Dare Wright was marked with a limited edition replica based on the original Lenci doll.
- 2009-2015: RJW produced felt dolls based on the Flower Fairy books of Cicely Mary Barker under license from Frederick Warne & Co.
- 2010-2018: RJW was licensed by Warner Bros. to produce felt art dolls and mohair mice based on the film The Wizard of Oz.
- 2012: an edition of the vintage Patsy and Skippy dolls designed by Bernard Lipfert were made by permission of the copyright holders.
- 2013: RJW began production of felt dolls based on the original Hummel designs under license from M.I. Hummel. In 1992, Goebel distributed a series of Christmas Angels, including the Celestial Musician which was released by RJW in late 2015.
- 2016: the company marked its 40th anniversary with joint ventures with Steiff, an extensive array of licensed pieces, and a line of mice, bears, cats, dogs, and lambs.

== Collector's Club ==
In 1996, the company formed the R. John Wright Collector's Club which attracted more than 4,000 members worldwide.

== Awards ==
- 1985: Doll of the Year Award from Doll Reader magazine, Christopher Robin and Winnie-the-Pooh
- 1986: Doll of the Year Award from Doll Reader magazine, Little Brother, Little Sister
- 1988: DOLLS Magazine Award of Excellence, Snow White and the Seven Dwarfs
- 1994: Jumeau Trophy, Most Outstanding Male Artist of Child Dolls in the World
- 1994: Golden Teddy Award from Teddy Bear Review magazine, Pocket Pooh
- 1995: DOLLS Magazine Award of Excellence, Geppetto & Pinocchio
- 2000: Der Goldene George Award, presented at Teddybar Total for Paddington Bear
- 2005: Jones Publishing Lifetime Achievement Award

== Quotes ==
"R. John Wright and his fanciful felt dolls exemplify the fine work being done by doll artists today."

"I am grateful that somehow I was given the strength—and the unfounded optimism—to begin making dolls. I don’t know where that came from, but it was like being on the edge of a cliff with no other alternative but to jump. I’m glad I did. But even if I had failed, it would be preferable to never knowing."
