= Kitchen (1966 film) =

- Directed by: Andy Warhol; Ronald Tavel
- Written by: Ronald Tavel
- Produced by: Andy Warhol
- Starring: Edie Sedgwick; Rene Ricard; Roger Trudeau; Ronald Tavel
- Distributed by: The Factory
- Release date: March 3, 1966
- Running time: 70 minutes
- Country: United States
- Language: English

Kitchen is a 1966 feature-length underground film directed by Andy Warhol and Ronald Tavel starring Edie Sedgwick and Roger Trudeau with appearances by Rene Ricard, Ronald Tavel, David McCabe, Donald Lyons, and Elektrah Lobel (aka Elektrah). The entire film takes place in the New York City apartment kitchen of Bud Wirtschafter, the sound man. The film was made in late May 1965 and premiered March 3, 1966 at the Film-makers' Cooperative in New York City.

== Plot ==
Devised to highlight Edie Sedgwick, this directionless black and white film begins with the sounds of sneezing. A classic Warhol static camera is pointed at an empty small white apartment kitchen. The voice of Sedgwick is then heard saying "Reel one of Andy Warhol's Kitchen, starring Edie Sedgwick as Jo and Roger Trudeau as Mickey, special assistance Buddy Wirtschafter, scenario by Ronald Tavel, directed by Andy Warhol.” Sedgwick then lists objects in the kitchen, including a "malted machine”, which is an electric mixer. Her voice then reveals the location of the scripts that are hidden on the set so that when actors forget their lines they can find them by pretending to be reading books or looking at the calendar on the wall.

Sedgwick as Jo then enters the kitchen and soon Rene Ricard enters and begins washing the dishes in the sink. As Jo applies her make-up, a photographer, played by photographer David McCabe, enters, photographs her and then exits. Roger Trudeau as Mickey enters, and there is much fumbling of the written lines. Jo gets on the table to exercise, which shows her attractive legs. Mickey and Jo woodenly discuss sex while the dishwasher remains silent with his back to the camera. Jo then pretends to be Mickey's mother by giving him a faux spanking. When Mickey begins a monologue, Jo turns on the electric mixer which drowns-out all dialogue. With that, Jo starts laughing and dancing to the grinding noise.

The second reel shows Jo studying her script and a male voice is heard off-screen announcing "Reel 2 of Andy Warhol's Kitchen starring Edie Sedgwick”. This is followed by announcing the other actors names as well as the technical assistance of Gerard Malanga. The voice then includes directions to the actors.

The malted machine is again turned on and then off. More aimless and passionless dialogue is exchanged as other actors, played by David McCabe, Donald Lyons, and Elektrah Lobel, enter and exit the chaotic scene. Jo spills coffee on the table.

The film drifts even more towards the style of reality television as Jo burns her hand on the kitchen stove and others react to it. At that point the actors seem to believe that they are no longer being filmed and make no effort at performing. Malanga enters to take a cold drink from the fridge as the film ends.

== See also ==
- List of American films of 1966
- Andy Warhol filmography
