= Truckin (disambiguation) =

"Truckin'" is a 1970 song by the Grateful Dead.

Truckin may also refer to:

- Truckin' Magazine, a sport truck magazine published by TEN: The Enthusiast Network
- Truckin (Reacher), a 2025 TV episode
