= Rona Barrett =

American gossip columnist, book writer, businesswoman, and philanthropist (born 1936)

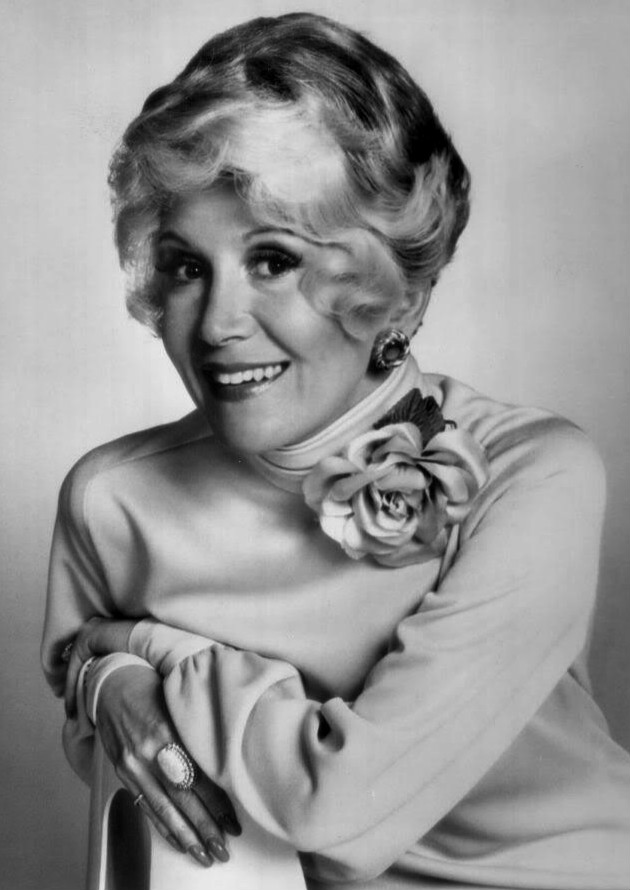
- Barrett in 1975
- Born: Rona Burstein; October 8, 1936 (age 90); New York, New York, U.S.
- Occupations: Actress; Gossip columnist
- Years active: 1957–1991
- Spouse(s): Bill Trowbridge (m. 1973; div. 1982); Daniel Busby (m. 2008)

Rona Barrett (born Rona Burstein; October 8, 1936) is a retired American television news correspondent, interviewer, gossip columnist and businesswoman. She runs the Rona Barrett Foundation, a non-profit organization in Santa Ynez, California, dedicated to the aid and support of senior citizens in need.

== Early life and career ==
Barrett was born on October 8, 1936, into a Jewish family in New York City. As a teenager, she overcame a degenerative hip condition that made walking extremely difficult, and organized fan clubs for popular singers she admired, such as Eddie Fisher and Steve Lawrence. She became a gossip columnist for the Bell-McClure Syndicate in 1957, and soon went to work for Bob Marcucci, the manager for teen idols Frankie Avalon and Fabian.

In 1966, she began broadcasting Hollywood gossip on the Los Angeles television station KABC-TV. She could be seen on television regularly, appearing on ABC's five owned and operated stations around the country. WABC-TV in New York put her pre-recorded gossip segment into its nightly local news, but anchor Roger Grimsby generally introduced it by making disparaging comments about her.

Barrett made actor and singer Frank Sinatra's enemies list by criticizing his personal life, particularly his relationships with his children. Barrett also angered actor Ryan O'Neal after she wrote some unflattering things about him. To retaliate, he supposedly sent her a box containing a live tarantula. She developed the first in-depth personal television specials about film, television, music, sports and political celebrities, and she had a series of magazines on the entertainment industry that were top-rated at newsstands, including Rona Barrett's Hollywood: Nothing but the Truth, published by Laufer Media. She also appeared on Jack Paar Tonite, where she clashed with Clement Freud.

== Network correspondent, 1975–1990 ==
Barrett began appearing on Good Morning America in 1975. In 1980, she moved to NBC's Today Show and was signed to co-host NBC's Tomorrow with Tom Snyder, but a public feud with Snyder, who regarded her as a correspondent rather than a co-host and refused to allow her segment to lead the show even when she had a major interview, resulted in her quitting the program in June 1981. After leaving Tomorrow, NBC gave her a weekly primetime entertainment magazine called Television: Inside and Out that premiered on December 5, 1981. Airing at an unpopular time slot, Saturdays at 10 p.m., and met with a scathing New York Times review, the program was cancelled in early 1982.

After leaving NBC, Barrett was senior correspondent for Entertainment Tonight from 1983 to 1986. In 1989, she briefly returned to NBC to host ten episodes of the morning show At Rona's. In 1990, she made a guest appearance as an interviewer at WWF's WrestleMania VI at Skydome in Toronto.

In 1991, she retired from the media and moved to her ranch in Santa Ynez, California, where she devoted her time running the Rona Barrett Foundation, an advocacy group for underserved senior citizens.

=== Acting ===
Barrett also made occasional film appearances, playing cameo roles in The Phynx (1970), Sextette (1978) and Mannix (Season 1, Episode 15; Season 8, Episode 12).

=== Books ===
In 1972, her novel titled The Lovo-maniacs was published. Her autobiography, Miss Rona, was published in 1974. It began: "An inch, Rona. Please, just let me put it in one inch!" as an unnamed famous actor pleaded to be allowed to experience a modicum of sexual intercourse with her. In the book, she acknowledged having a nose job and discussed details of her teenage fan club involvements and her work with Frankie Avalon's management. She wrote the book How You Can Look Rich and Achieve Sexual Ecstasy (1978).

== Honors ==
In 2009, a Golden Palm Star on the Palm Springs Walk of Stars was dedicated to her.

== Commercial ventures ==
Barrett founded the Rona Barrett Lavender Company in Santa Ynez, California, as a producer of lavender bath, beauty, food and aromatherapy products. The company follows a model of using celebrity-branded consumer goods to generate funds and raise awareness of a non-profit cause. A portion of all company proceeds were donated to the Rona Barrett Foundation. According to the foundation's website, it has ceased selling lavender products and the company has been sold.

Barrett started The Rona Barrett Foundation, a non-profit organization dedicated to the aid and support of senior citizens in need, that was supported by a 2% portion of the profits from her lavender business until it ceased production. The foundation only takes direct donations and is working on building a village named "the Golden Inn and Cottages" for seniors in need of proper housing and care facilities. As of May 2012, it was a pilot program that was still under development. In 2025, the Golden Inn and Cottages was a thriving housing community for low-income seniors.

== Personal life ==
Barrett was married to Bill Trowbridge from September 22, 1973, until their divorce on October 19, 1982. They later reconciled and remained together until his death in 2001.

In 1986, she bought a ranch at Santa Ynez and began commuting to Los Angeles.

On February 14, 2008, she married Daniel Busby.

According to AV Club, Barrett has spent much of her life suppressing her Jewish heritage. When she introduced herself at the agency, she switched her birth surname to the less Jewish-sounding Barrett.

== Filmography ==
=== Film ===
Year	Title	Role	Notes
1970	The Phynx	Gossip Columnist	comedy film directed by Lee H. Katzin
1970	Do Not Throw Cushions into the Ring	Starring role	drama film written and directed by Steve Ihnat
1978	Sextette	Herself	comedy/musical film directed by Ken Hughes
1979	An Almost Perfect Affair	Herself	uncredited

=== Television ===
Year	Title	Role	Notes
1968	Mannix	Herself	episode: "The Falling Star" (S 1:Ep 15)
1974	Mannix	Herself	episode: "A Choice of Victims" (S 8:Ep 12)
1974	The Odd Couple	Herself	episode: "The Dog Story" (S 5:Ep 5)
1975	Match Game 75	Herself	episodes: 38 through 42
1976	The Sonny & Cher Show	Herself	episode: "Premiere" (S 1:Ep 1)
1981	Television: Inside and Out	Herself/host	television show about television personalities
1985	America	Correspondent	television show
1987	Moonlighting	Herself	episode: "The Straight Poop" (S 3:Ep 9)

=== Pay-per-view ===
Year	Title	Role	Notes
1990	WrestleMania VI	Interviewer	Skydome (now Rogers Centre) in Toronto
