= Beauregard Houston-Montgomery =

Doll collector

Beauregard Houston-Montgomery is a doll collector, socialite, photographer, and journalist. He was formerly a contributing editor of the fashion periodical Details and Doll Reader. He specializes on the subjects of doll making and doll collecting.

== Career ==
Houston-Montgomery was a columnist for Details magazine.

Houston-Montgomery was a friend of pop artist Andy Warhol. He interviewed costume designer William Travilla for the July 1986 issue of Warhol's Interview magazine. He also interviewed actress Kim Novak for the December 1986 issue.

Houston-Montgomery has also written features in Vanity Fair, Elle, Elle Decor, Harper's Bazaar, World of Interiors, HG, Vogue, Playgirl, The Advocate, and Torso.

Houston-Montgomery wrote extensively on different models of doll and was a contributing editor of Doll Reader. He noted that competitor dolls of Barbie – Tressy and Dawn – displayed a "glitzy lifestyle ... devoid of social responsibility, a precursor of the disco consciousness of the 1970s." He commented on Mattel's belated adoption of fashion dolls in the mid-1980s. His book of his own photographs of dollhouses and tableaus, Dollhouse Living, is considered a collector's item, as is his miniature Hanuman Books volume of essays and profiles titled Pouf Pieces.

More recently Houston-Montgomery served as associate producer for Perfect Day Films, on documentaries by Timothy Greenfield-Sanders, including About Face: Supermodels Then and Now, The Women's List, The Trans List, and Toni Morrison: The Pieces I Am.

== Personal life ==
Houston-Montgomery, never one to hide his androgyny, now refers to himself as genderqueer, after conferring with Janet Mock, with whom he worked on The Trans List.
