= Knucklebones (magazine) =

- Editor: Sarah Gloystein Peterson
- Categories: Board game, Card game, Puzzle
- Frequency: Bi-monthly
- Publisher: Jones Publishing
- First issue: November 2005
- Final issue: 2007
- Company: Jones Publishing, Inc.
- Country: USA
- Based in: Iola, Wisconsin
- Language: English
- ISSN: 1554-3277

Knucklebones was a bi-monthly United States–based magazine, focused on providing news and reviews of board games and card games. The magazine included some puzzles and contests, typically with a game-oriented theme, and also included puzzles such as Sudoku and crosswords. Its headquarters was in Iola, Wisconsin.

Knucklebones won praise on the board game forum BoardGameGeek after they agreed to honour the subscriptions of former Games Quarterly Magazine subscribers.

Knucklebones was published by Jones Publishing.
