= Rene Ricard =

American poet (1946–2014)

- Ricard in 2009
- Born: Albert Napoleon Ricard; July 23, 1946; Boston, United States
- Died: February 1, 2014 (aged 67); New York City, United States
- Occupations: Poet; actor; art critic; painter

Rene Ricard (July 23, 1946 – February 1, 2014) was an American poet, actor, art critic, and painter.

== Biography ==
=== Early life ===
Albert Napoleon Ricard was born in Boston and grew up in Acushnet, Massachusetts, near New Bedford. As a teenager he ran away to Boston and assimilated into the literary scene of the city. Ricard supported himself by working as a model for art classes in the Boston area. While visiting galleries on Newbury Street in 1964, he was encouraged to see an exhibition at the Institute of Contemporary Art, where he encountered one of Andy Warhol's Flowers paintings. The work made a profound impression on him; Ricard later described the experience as a turning point that inspired him to pursue a life in art.

=== Andy Warhol and the Factory ===
Before moving to New York, Ricard had become familiar with Warhol through a Life magazine feature on the artist and the Factory. Believing Warhol would be receptive to him, Ricard relocated to New York City in 1965 after taking over a friend's apartment on East 6th Street. Shortly after arriving, artist Al Hansen encouraged him to visit the Factory and provided directions. Ricard walked in unannounced and met Andy Warhol, Chuck Wein, Edie Sedgwick, and Billy Name, marking the beginning of his association with Warhol's circle. He subsequently appeared in the Warhol films Kitchen (1965), Chelsea Girls (1966), and The Andy Warhol Story (1966).

=== Acting and literary career ===
As a performer, Ricard was a founding participant in the Theater of the Ridiculous, collaborating with John Vaccaro and Charles Ludlam. He also appeared in the 1980 Eric Mitchell independent film Underground U.S.A. (1980), as well as numerous other independent art and commercial films.

In the 1980s, he wrote a series of influential essays for Artforum magazine. Having achieved stature in the art world by successfully launching the career of painter Julian Schnabel, Ricard helped bring Jean-Michel Basquiat to fame. In December 1981, he published the first major article on Basquiat and Keith Haring, entitled "The Radiant Child," in Artforum.

Ricard also contributed art essays to numerous gallery and exhibition catalogs. He was immortalized by Jean-Michel Basquiat in the drawing entitled Untitled (Axe/Rene), representing the tension that existed between the two.

Warhol called Ricard "the George Sanders of the Lower East Side, the Rex Reed of the art world." From the mid-1960s Ricard contributed writings to numerous independent poetry magazines and anthologies. In 1979, the Dia Art Foundation published Ricard's first book of poems, an eponymous volume styled on Tiffany & Co. catalog. The fact that the turquoise-covered book of poems appears in photographs taken on the beach in The Ballad of Sexual Dependency by Nan Goldin illustrates its ubiquity as summer reading in 1979.

His second book of poetry, God With Revolver (Hanuman Books) was published ten years later, edited by Raymond Foye. The same year he contributed poems to Francesco Clemente: Sixteen Pastels (London: Anthony D'Offay). Ricard released two other volumes of poetry: Trusty Sarcophagus Co. (Inanout Press, 1990), which featured his poems rendered in paintings and drawings and was the basis of an exhibit at the Petersburg Gallery, New York City; and Love Poems (C U Z Editions, 1999) as a collaboration with artist Robert Hawkins who provided drawings for the book. Ricard also saw publication of single-poem works as limited edition artist books: Opera of the Worms with paintings by Judy Rifka (1984), Cecil (2004), and In Daddy's Hand with artist Rita Barros (2010).

Beginning in the late 1980s Ricard's poems were often rendered in paintings and drawings. His work was the subject of several solo gallery exhibitions in the United States and United Kingdom, as well as being represented in many group exhibitions. In 2003, Percival Press published the full-color monograph Paintings & Drawings, illustrating a collection of visually rendered poems by Ricard. In 2004, Ricard created the album cover for Shadows Collide with People by musician John Frusciante.

=== Later life and death ===
Ricard was portrayed by Michael Wincott in Julian Schnabel's biographical film, Basquiat (1996).

He lived at the famed Hotel Chelsea in New York City intermittently for 40 years.

Ricard died on February 1, 2014, of cancer at Bellevue Hospital in New York City at the age of 67.

== Legacy ==
Ricard and his work and effects were the subject of two solo posthumous exhibits at the Half Gallery in Manhattan, the latter in 2017 and a three-person show in 2025.

Before his death Ricard and the textile designer Madeline Weinrib designed five carpets together which later were realized and shown at the Emma Scully gallery.

== Books ==
Year	Title	Publisher	Notes
1979	Rene Ricard 1979 - 1980	DIA Art Foundation	Edited by Gerard Malanga
1989	Francesco Clemente Sixteen Pastels with Poems by Rene Ricard	Anthony d'Offay Gallery, London	Edited by Raymond Foye. Exhibition catalog reproducing leaves of a handmade book by Ricard titled Buried in a Crate.
1989	God With Revolver: Poems 1979 - 1982	Hanuman Books	Published and edited by Raymond Foye and Francesco Clemente
1990	Trusty Sarchopagus Co.	Inanout Press	Designed and edited by Paola Igliori and Michele Zalopany. The book was prepared concurrent with an exhibition of Ricard's painting and visual works at the Peterburg Gallery in NYC. The edition juxtaposes the photographs of the paintings and drawings with transcriptions of the poems rendered within them.
1999	Love Poems	CUZ Editions	Drawings by Robert Hawkins / Edited by Richard Hell
2003	Paintings and Drawings	Perceval Press	Reproductions of Ricard's visual works produced over a twenty-year period.
2016	Rene Ricard Notebook 2010 - 2012	Morel Books	Facsimile edition of one of Ricard's composition books containing poems, collages, drawings, diary and personal notes. Published posthumously.
2018	Rene Ricard 1979 - 1980	Éditions Lutanie	Edited by Manon Lutanie and Rachel Valinsky. Bilingual volume (French/English).
2021	Time of the Dogs	Innen Books	Edited by Raymond Foye. Posthumously published collection of twenty poems.
2022	God with Revolver	Editions Lutanie	Edited by Manon Lutanie and Rachel Valinsky. With an introduction by Raymond Foye and an afterword by Patrick Fox. Bilingual volume (French/English).
2023	Deus de Revólver	Barco Bêbado	Portuguese edition of "God With Revolver." Translation by Luís Lima, with an introduction by Raymond Foye, and cover photos by Rita Barros.
2024	Love Poems	Editions Lutanie	With drawings by Robert Hawkins. Bilingual edition (French/English), translated by Rachel Valinsky and Manon Lutanie. Includes a newly commissioned afterword by Robert Hawkins retracing his encounter, friendship, and collaboration with Rene Ricard.

== Art reviews and essays ==
Year	Title	Publication	Notes
1977	Hunt Slonem and Harrison Burns at Fishbach	Art in America, Nov./Dec. 1977	Review
1978	Bill Sullivan at Kornblee	Art in America, Sep./Oct. 1978	Review
1978	Patti Smith and Robert Mapplethorpe at Miller	Art in America, Sep./Oct. 1978	Review
1979	Lynda Benglis at Paula Cooper	Art in America, Jan./Feb. 1979	Review
1979	Julian Schnabel's Plate Painting at Mary Boone	Art in America, Nov. 1979	Review
1979	The Benois Madonna at Konedler	Art in America, Dec. 1979	Review
1979	Peter Hujar at Marcuse Pfeifer	Art in America, Dec. 1979	Review
1981	Not About Julian Schnabel	Artforum, Summer 1981	Picking up where the Art in America Schnabel review ended this essay, Ricard's first full-length, established Julian Schnabel as the premier celebrity of the new-New York art scene. Prior to publication of the issue, Ricard was so secretive about the subject of the essay that whenever asked who he was writing about he would reply, "Not about Julian Schnabel!", thus giving the title of the essay.
1981	The Radiant Child	Artforum, Dec. 1981	Ricard's landmark essay defined the East Village gallery scene of the early 1980s. This essay is credited with launching the public career of Jean-Michel Basquiat, as well as naming Keith Haring's ubiquitous "crawling baby" character. In addition to Basquiat and Haring, the essay also highlights the work of Judy Rifka, John Ahern, Ronnie Cutrone, Izhar Patkin, Joe Zucker, and other artists showing at the numerous independent New York art exhibitions of the period.
1982	The Pledge of Allegiance	Artforum, Nov. 1982	Art essay, East Village gallery scene
1982	About Julian Schnabel	Julian Schnabel; Stedelijk Museum (Amsterdam)	Catalog essay
1982	Julian Schnabel: The American Sublime	Julian Schnabel; Stedelijk Museum (Amsterdam)	Catalog essay
1982	The Greatest Show On Earth	Judith Rifka; Brooke Alexander Gallery (New York City)	Catalog essay
1984	Alex Katz Paints a Picture	Alex Katz; Cooper Union (New York City)	Introduction catalog essay for exhibition curated by Rene Ricard
1985	An Art of Regret	Artforum, Summer 1985	Essay about the paintings of Brice Marden and Bill Rice
1986	An Ad for Felix	Artforum, Sep. 1986	Essay about the paintings of Felix
1987	Nicolas A. Moufarrege	Nicholas A. Moufarrege; The Institute for Art & Urban Resources / The Clocktower, 1987	Catalog essay for posthumous exhibition of Moufarrege's thread and pigment on needlepoint canvas paintings, originally written as a memorial / obituary published in 1985 by The Village Voice.
1989	Les Lecons des Tenebres	William Rand; 56 Bleecker Street Gallery, New York City	Catalog essay
1990	Zero Mass: The Art of Eric Orr	Anders Tornberg Gallery & AB Propexus	Catalog essay for artist Book by Eric Orr which also includes a multiple made of clay by James Lee Byars; front and back boards of blue steel; "The Matter of O," a rubber-stamped stain of Orr's blood; "Skull Page" made of handmade paper using Kozo fibers; and a powdered mummy skull with red screen printing.
1992	World Crown© Bodhisattua with Clenched Mudra	Jean-Michel Basquiat; Whitney Museum of American Art, New York City	Catalog essay for the first major museum retrospect of Basquiat's work following his untimely death.
1992	Golden Boy	Vogue, Oct. 1992	Essay includes Ricard's personal reminiscence of Jean-Michele Basquiat and the New York City art scene of the early 1980s.
1997	Andy Warhol: Thirty Are Better Than One	Andy Warhol; Tony Shafrazi Gallery, New York City	Catalog essay
1997	No Dice: Recollections of Jack Smith	Artforum, Oct. 1997	Art essay
1998	The Autobiography of a Pseudonym	Essay on songwriter, designer, and fine artists Gil Garfield.	Published as a leaflet on the occasion of Garfiled's 1998 exhibition at Louis Stern Fine Arts, Hollywood.
1999	Pompeiian Styles III - IV and the Paintings of Philip Taaffe	Philip Taaffe; Gagosian Gallery, New York City	Catalog essay
1999	Studio Visit	Francesco Clemente: A Portrait; Photos Luca Babini (Aperture pub.)	Art essay
2000	Chronology	Francesco Clemente; Guggenheim Museum, New York City	Ricard drew upon his twenty-year relationship with Clemente to compose a uniquely personal and candid timeline of significant events, public and private, from the artist's life.
2002	The Profanation of Time	Francesco Clemente; Jablonka Galerie, Cologne	Catalog essay
2002	Zac Posen: 21 And Getting the Critics All Worked Up	Interview, May 2002	Essay and interview with fashion designer Zac Posen
2002	On Ludlow Street	Interview, August 2002	Magazine article
2002	Lola Schnabel: Remember Me	Percival Press	Art essay
2004	Genthara: Luigi Ontani	Luigi Ontani; SMAK, Ghent	Catalog essay
2008	The Poetry of Everyday Live	Rita Barros; Galeria Pente 10, Lisbon	Catalog essay
2009	Wall: Rita Barros	Rita Barros; Casa de Cerca – Centro de Arte Contemporanea, Lisbon	Catalog introduction
2012	Bob Recine: Alchemy of Beauty	Freedman Damiani	Catalog essay
2012	Art Brocante: The Sculpture of Arch Connelly	Arch Connelly; La Mama Gallery, New York City	Catalog essay
2015	Jean-Michel Basquiat	Gagosian Gallery / Rizolli	Catalog essay

== Selected additional published works ==
Year	Publication	Title(s)	Format	Notes
1966	Aspen; Vol I, issue #6	The Stones Have Begun Making Me Sick	Multi-format magazine	Called "the magazine in a box", each issue of Aspen was a collection of various related publications. The Fab issue, designed by Andy Warhol and David Dalton, contained reproductions of paintings by Warhol, de Kooning, Johns, and others; a flex-disc by The Velvet Underground; a copy of The Exploding Plastic Inevitable newspaper, a flip book of the Jack Smith film Buzzards Over Baghdad and Warhol's Kiss; a Ten Trip Ticket Book printing excerpts from the Berkeley Conference on LSD, and more. For The Exploding Plastic Inevitable, Gerard Malanga contributed an essay on contemporary poetry featuring an otherwise unpublished poem by Ricard, The Stones Have Begun Making Me Sick.
1967	Harbinger; issue #1	Baby Jane, Edie Sedgwick, Oh Call It The Squares	Independent film and culture magazine	Single-issue independently published magazine, edited by Gregg Barrios. Cover photo of Andy Warhol and Gerard Malanga. The three early poems are credited to Albert Rene Ricard and do not appear in any other publication.
1967	Angel Hair; issue #3	Oh, Visions of Arthur and Party Crash	Poetry magazine	Independently published literary magazine; New York City. Oh was published as a part of Rene Ricard 1979 – 1980. Visions of Arthur later published in Extensions No. 4, 1970. All three poems were also included in The Angel Hair Anthology.
1968	The World; issue #8	assignment: Good Poem	Poetry magazine	The World, edited by Anne Waldman, was published by The Poetry Project at Saint Mark's Church, New York City. This poem did not appear in any other publication until its inclusion in the Out Of This World anthology published in 1991.
1969	Roots Forming; issue #1		Poetry magazine	Also includes works by Piero Heliczer, Gerard Malanga, Clark Coolidge, and others.
1970	The World Anthology	Change Here for All Points	Poetry anthology	An anthology of poems from The Saint Mark's Poetry Project including works by Ted Berrigan, Lewis Warsh, John Ashbery, Allen Ginsberg, Peter Schjeldahl, Jonathan Kundra, Gerard Malanga, Ron Padgett, Joe Brainard, Dian DiPrima, Harris Schiff, FrankO'Hara, Sam Avrams, and others, edited by Anne Waldman.
1970	Paris Review; summer 1970	Mannerism	Literary journal	Mannerism later published as part of Rene Ricard 1979 - 1980.
1970	exTensions; issue #4	Visions of Arthur	Poetry magazine	Independently published poetry journal; New York City. Other contributors in the issue included Vito Acconci, John Ashbery, Clark Coolidge, Jean Dubuffet, Barbara Guest, Piero Heliczer, Gerard Malanga
1974	Gay Sunshine; issue #24	The John in Sterling	Gay rights journal	Gay Sunshine: A Journal of Gay Liberation edited by Winston Leyland out of San Francisco, strongly counter-culture and anti-establishment. This issue features a series of humorous written dialogues collected by Ricard in 1971–72. Titled The John in Sterling, the dialogues are anonymous encounters from the men's room of the Sterling Library at Yale University, written on toilet paper and passed between the stall partitions. This is the only published appearance of this piece.
1977	Mag City; issue #3	On Being Called a Dilettante, Caravaggio and His Models and The Slaves of Michelangelo.	Poetry magazine	Mag City was an independent New York poetry magazine published by Gregory Masters, Michael Scholnick and Gary Lenhart from 1976 through 1982. All three of these poems would be published as part of Rene Ricard 1979 - 1980.
1978	New York Times	I Class Up a Joint	Op-Ed essay	Humorous essay on the topic of work, written for Labor Day.
1978	Face of the Poet (Alex Katz, Brooke Alexander / Marlborough Graphics)	I remember the little house in the woods	Exhibition catalog	Published catalog of a collection of ten aquatint portraits of poets by Alex Katz, each accompanied with a poem from the respective subjects. Ricard's portrait is paired with his poem I remember the little house in the woods. This poem was also included in "Rene Ricard 1979 – 1980".
1978	The 4 3 2 Review; issue #7	On the Tomb of WH	Poetry magazine	The 4 3 2 Review was an independent literary magazine published by Simon Schuchat, New York. Contribution of the poem On the Tomb of WH which also appears as a part of Rene Ricard 1979 – 1980.
1978	Little Caesar; issue #6	A Boy and His Dog	Poetry magazine	This issue also includes Grace After A Meal, for John Wieners by John Berrigan, seven poems by John Wieners, as well as contributions by Dennis Cooper, the publisher, Robert Creeley, Gerard Malanga, Rene Ricard, Lita Hornick, among others.
1978	X magazine; vol. #3	The Party Manifesto	Art & literature magazine	Published by Collaborative Projects (Colab), NYC. The final issue of X Magazine continued the themes of violence and international terrorism from its predecessors – particularly the Baader-Meinhof group. A mix of pop borrowings and oblique critique, the issue includes "The Party Manifesto" by Rene Ricard, photographs of punk music stars Johnny Rotten and Anya Phillips by Jimmy de Sana, pseudoscientific charts of walking by Cara M. Brownell, photographs of a German war prostitute by Tina Lhotsky, Jean Genet defending the Baader-Meinhof gang, and dialogue between Diego Cortez and a man who claimed to be a Baader-Meinhof member. The issue showed the deep mistrust by Colab members for how media outlets, from mainstream television to magazines, covered events and individuals associated with the underground and political opposition.
1979	Mag City; issue #6	WAKE*UP NEW YORK*ATTENTION	Poetry magazine	Contribution of the poem WAKE*UP NEW YORK*ATTENTION. This poem does not appear in any other publication.
1979	Mag City; issue #8	The Pledge of Allegiance	Poetry magazine	Magazine contribution of The Pledge of Allegiance. This poem was later published as part of God With Revolver (1989), there dated 1969.
1979	Dodgems	April 29	Poetry magazine	Dodgems was an independently published magazine edited by Eileen Myles for Fido Productions, NYC published for a short period in 1979 - 1980. April 29 appears in Rene Ricard 1979 – 1980 under the name Sonnet.
1979	Little Caesar; issue #9		Poetry magazine	Poetry magazine featuring Piero Heliczer; edited by Gerard Malanga with additional contributions by Robert Creeley, Ezra Pound, William Burroughs, Paul Metcalf, Louis Zukofsky, John Weiners, Charles Olson, Ira Cohen, Gregory Corso, Tom Raworth, Clark Coolidge, David Rattray, Anne Waldman, La Monte Young, Dennis Cooper and others.
1981	Anoir, Eblanc, Irouge, Uvert, Obleu	The Death of Johnny Stompananto	Poetry magazine	Magazine contribution, poem The Death of Johnny Stompanato (Italian translation by Mario Diacono). Johnny Stompanato was the boyfriend of Lana Turner, shot and killed in 1958 by Turner's daughter, Cheryl Crane. Andy Warhol's 1965 film, More Milk Yvette (starring Mario Montez in drag as Lana Turner) was based on the same subject matter.
1983	Son of the Male Muse: New Gay Poetry	Caravaggio and His Models and I was Born	Poetry anthology	Published by The Crossing Press, edited by Ian Young. Includes two poems by Ricard; Caravaggio and His Models and I was Born.
1984	Artforum; Nov. 1984	Caravaggio and His Models	Art journal	Ricard was a frequent contributor of essays to Artforum magazine, here publishing one of his poems.
1984	Opera of the Worms		Limited edition folio	Joe Fawbush Editions / Solo Press, 1984. Text by Ricard with illustrations by Judy Rifka. Published in a limited edition of eighty copies signed and numbered by Ricard and Rifka. Publication composed of 23 unbound lithos in a portfolio in slipcase.
1985	East Village Eye; vol. 7, issue #59	La Peste	Newspaper	Contribution of Rene Ricard's poem La Peste. The East Village Eye was described as a "community in print" incorporating news, nightclubs, art, film, music, and fashion.
1989	Parkett; issue #21	The Pledge of Allegiance	Art and literary journal	Contribution of the poem The Pledge of Allegiance. Due to an editorial error, only the first fifteen lines of the poem were presented.
1989	Parkett; issue #22	The Pledge of Allegiance	Art and literary journal	Magazine contribution of the poem The Pledge of Allegiance, presented in both English and a German translation along with the following note: "Because of a technical error, Rene Ricard's poem 'The Pledge of Allegiance' was not published in its complete form in our last issue. We would like to apologize to the author." The poem, composed in 1969, was also published as part of God With Revolver. Ricard used the same title for his essay about graffiti artists published by Artform magazine in 1982.
1989	Keith Haring: Eight Ball	La Peste	Artist's book	Artist's book created on the occasion of Haring's 30th birthday and published by ArT Random. In Haring's own words, "It was constructed like a kind of game. First I went through drawers full of old mementos, newspaper clippings and drawings that I had saved and found ones that were particularly interesting to me. Then, they were randomly glued onto the 20 sheets of paper which measured to correspond to the side of a double-page spread in the book. After this, I pained the papers with red and green gouache. Finally, with black sumi ink, I 'finished' each of the drawings." Filling two pages of the book is Rene Ricard's poem La Peste, originally published in The East Village Eye. A single line of La Peste was published independently under the title Love in God With Revolver.
1990	The New Censorship	The Pledge of Allegiance, God With Revolver and The Dog.	Literary journal	Self-described as "The Monthly Journal of the Next Savage State", this issue featured three Ricard poems, in addition to the poem For Rene Ricard by Robert Creeley and a photograph of Ricard by Allen Ginsberg.
1990	Julian Schnabel Sculpture, Pace Gallery	Imagination	Exhibition catalog	Catalog contribution of the poem Imagination, also published as part of Trusty Sarcophagus Co.,
1991	Lacanina Ink; issue #3	Paintings: It's Small for a Shoe (1989), Poison (1990), and Mal de Fin (1990)	Literary journal	Illustrations of three of Ricard's paintings.
1991	Tema Celeste; issue #29	Painting: Poison (1990)	Arts journal	Magazine color reproduction of Ricard painting Poison (1990). The version of the painting featured is different from that published in Trusty Sarcophagus Co..
1991	Out Of This World: The Poetry Project at the St. Mark's Church-in-the-Bowery, An Anthology 1966–1991	Assignment: Good Poem	Poetry anthology	Crown Publishers. A comprehensive anthology of poetry published in The World, edited by Anne Waldman. Includes Ricard's assignment: Good Poem.
1992	Joe's, magazine, Issue #1	Painting Holy Smoke reproduced for the cover	Art, photography, fashion & culture magazine	Edited by stylist Joe McKenna
2001	The Angel Hair Anthology	Oh, Visions of Arthur and Party Crash	Poetry anthology	Anthology presents material selected from the collection of Angel Hair magazine and books edited by Anne Waldman and Lewis Warsh between 1966 and 1978. Includes three poems by Rene Ricard: Oh, Visions of Arthur and Party Crash.
2004	Cecil	Cecil	Limited edition book	Shivastan Publishing; Woodstock, NY / Kathmandu, Nepal. Poem by Ricard paired with traditional Nepali illustrations, printed in a limited edition of 250 copies on handmade paper. Also offered in a limited edition broadside print.
2010	Live Mag!; issue #8	The Years Like Days	Poetry magazine	Art and poetry magazine edited by Jeffrey Cyphers Wright.
2010	In Daddy's Hand	In Daddy's Hand	Limited edition book	Rene Ricard & Rita Barros. Poem by Ricard paired with vintage photographs from the collection of Barros. Handmade artist's book, printed in a limited edition of 50 copies.
2012	Live Mag!; issue #9	Suicide	Poetry magazine	Art and poetry magazine edited by Jeffrey Cyphers Wright.
2012	Night and Day; David Armstrong	Night and Day	Artist's book	Book of David Armstrong photographs, includes reproduction of handwritten poem and cover design by Ricard. Morel Books; edition of 1,000.
2015	Four by Two	Previously unavailable poems/two postcards of his painted poems	Poetry magazine	Four by Two was a handmade miniature literary magazine overseen by poet klipschutz.

== Solo exhibitions ==
Year	Exhibition	Gallery	Notes
1990	Paintings 1989 – 1990	Petersburg Gallery, New York City	
2003	Rene Ricard Paintings	Cheim & Read, New York City	
2008	What Every Young Sissy Should Know	Scream Gallery, London	Vito Schnabel presentation
2009	The Torturer's Apprentice	Half Gallery, New York City	
2011	Sonnets from the Portugues	Vito Schnabel Presents, New York City	
2012	Go Mae West, Young Man	Vito Schnabel Presents, Los Angeles	
2012	New Paintings and Not So New	Highlight Gallery, San Francisco	Vito Schnabel presentation
2017	So, who left who?	Half Gallery, New York City	Posthumous exhibition of paintings and drawings
2019	But you love me... you said so	Half Gallery, New York City	Posthumous exhibition of paintings and drawings
2021	Growing Up in America	Vito Schnabel Gallery, New York City	Posthumous exhibition of paintings and drawings
2022	Nightcrawlers	Little House Gallery, Los Angeles	Posthumous exhibition of paintings and drawings

== Film performances ==
Year	Title	Director	Format	Notes
1965	Queen of the Night Gotta Box of Light	Saul Levine	16 mm, black & white, silent, 4 minutes	Starring Vivian Kurz, with Ivan Cohn, Andrew Meyer and Rene Ricard. In this impressionistic portrait Kurz, Cohn, Meyer and Ricard are shown hanging out at Kurz's Cambridge apartment getting high. The theme centers around a light box made by Gert Stern and Andrew Meyer. Director Saul Levine is a widely respected filmmaker and considered to be a master of the 8 mm and 16 mm formats. He has been making films for four decades and is currently a professor of filmmaking at the Massachusetts College of Art and Design.
1965	Kitchen	Andy Warhol	16 mm, black & white, 66 minutes	Theater of the Ridiculous playwright Ronald Tavel scripted this absurdist satire on the bourgeois household. The filming takes place in a real kitchen, with Edie Sedgwick and Roger Trudeau playing an unhappy married couple. The action is interrupted by various chaotic activities: the running of a blender which drowns out the dialogue, the continual sneezing of Sedgwick and her co-stars, the bustling activities of a house boy, played by Rene Ricard, and appearances by photographer David McCabe, who repeatedly strides onto the set to take pictures of the actors. At the end of the film, Sedgwick burns her finger and Warhol and his colleagues appear on camera.
1966	Screen Test: Rene Ricard	Andy Warhol	16 mm, black & white, silent, 4 minutes	Between 1964 and 1966 Andy Warhol pioneered a unique type of cinematic portraiture. In the screen tests, Warhol adopted a consistent, disarmingly straightforward approach in which each subject was asked to sit motionless before his stationary camera. Eerily compelling, these screen tests testify to the inexhaustible fascination with the human persona that fueled Warhol's portrait investigations in photography, painting, and film.
1966	Chelsea Girls	Andy Warhol	16 mm, black & white, 195/210 minutes	Warhol's most famous film, is a series of twelve uncut reels each depicting the goings-on in a different room of the Chelsea Hotel. The reels are projected side-by-side creating a fascinating split-screen effect. The first of Warhol's films to receive a commercial release. Directed, produced, and photographed by Andy Warhol; Written by Ronald Tavel and Andy Warhol; Music: The Velvet Underground; With: Ondine, International Velvet, Nico, Eric Emerson, Gerard Malanga, Rene Ricard, Mary Woronov, Brigid Polk, Ed Hood, Patrick Fleming, Pepper Davis, and Mario Montez.
1966	An Early Clue to a New Direction	Andrew Meyer / Victor Hack	16 mm, black & white, 28 minutes	Featuring Joy Bang, Prescott Townsend, Rene Ricard. Music by the Unidentified Flying Objects. Award: First Prize, Ann Arbor Film Festival, 1967 / Exhibition: Int'l Festival of Short Films, London; Film Theatre, 1968 / Collection: British Film Institute
1966	Hall of Mirrors	Walter Sonbert	16 mm, black & white/color, 7 minutes	Warren Sonbert (1947 - 1995), an independent filmmaker renowned for his avant-garde, diarist style, began producing films in 1966. This film is an outgrowth of one of Sonbert's film classes at NYU in which he was given out takes from a 1947 Hollywood murder film photographed by Hal Mohr to re-edit into a narrative sequence. Adding to the footage, Sonbert filmed Rene Ricard at home and Gerard Malanga at a show of Lucas Samaras's 'Hall of Mirrors'.
1966	The Andy Warhol Story	Andy Warhol	16 mm, black & white	Notoriously unreleased (lost) film in which both Ricard and Sedgwick viciously imitate Warhol.
1967	B.O.N.Y. (aka Boys of New York)	Gregg Barrios	16 mm, black & white	Cast: Gerard Malanga, Rene Ricard, Ivy Nicholson (Vogue model) and Leonard Cohen (singer).
1967	Joan of Arc	Piero Heliczer	Color with sound on tape; 11 minutes	Poet turned filmmaker, Piero Heliczer was among the most notable of underground directors of the mid '60s. In a cast that included Ira Cohen, Gerard Malanga, Jack Smith, and Andy Warhol, Rene Ricard played the title role of Joan of Arc dressed as a 1950s French maid.
1967	**** (aka Four Stars)	Andy Warhol	16 mm, 1500 minutes	Warhol's ambitious follow-up to Chelsea Girls, **** [aka Four Stars] consisted of 94 color sound half-hour reels projected superimposed two at a time over a continuous span of 25 hours, shown only once in its entirety in December 1967. The cast consisted of all the Warhol superstar regulars; Allen Midgette, International Velvet, Edie Sedgwick, Christian Aaron Boulogne, Eric Emerson, Gerard Malanga, Nico, Ondine, Rona Page, Brigid Polk, Ingrid Superstar, Mary Woronov, Tiger Morse, Waldo Diaz Balart, Marcia Trinder, Johanna Lawrencon, Katrina Toland, Ultra Violet, Baby Jane Holzer, Rene Ricard, Ivy Nicholson, Rodney Kitzmiller, Roger Trudeau, Patrick Fleming, Ed Hood, Susan Pile, John Cale, Paul Morrisey, Ronnie Cutrone, Freddy Herko, Nick Cernovich, Ray Johnson, La Monte Young, Yvonne Rainer, Billy Name.
1968	Pre-Raphaelite Dream	Gerard Malanga	16 mm	Cast included: Loulou de la Falaise, International Velvet, John Weiners, Emma Malagna, Mario Anniballi, and Rene Ricard.
1973	An American Family	Craig Gilbert	Television documentary series	An American Family, the 1973 cinema verité production that followed the lives of Bill and Pat Loud of Santa Barbara, Calif., and their five children: Michele, Delilah, Grant, Kevin and Lance. The 12 hour PBS series, a precursor to today's "reality" television shows, created a stir by documenting the troubles of one American family, bringing to hundreds of thousands of living rooms scenes of Bill and Pat Loud's crumbling marriage and Lance's evolving decision to declare openly he was gay. Rene Ricard makes appears in two episodes.
1978	Sleepless Nights	Becky Johnston	Super 8 mm; 49 minutes	Written by Becky Johnson and Gary Indiana. Original score by John Lurie. Cast included: John Lurie, Eric Mitchell, Maripol, and Rene Ricard.
1979	Red Italy	Eric Mitchell	Black & white, 55 minutes	Second feature film by director Eric Mitchell is a Bertolucci-style story of a bored, rich woman looking for romance and adventure. Cast includes Jennifer Miro, Patti Astor, Harold Vogl, Scott Wardell, Tom Wright, John Lurie, Arto Lindsay, Eric Mitchell, Rene Ricard, Gordon Stevenson, Johnny O'Kane, and James Nares. Rene Ricard plays a manipulative boyfriend in a scene with Jennifer Miro (filmed at the El Quixote restaurant in the Chelsea Hotel).
1980	Underground USA	Eric Mitchell	Color, 85 minutes	"Street hustler Mitchell forces his way into the life of has-been movie star Astor. Rambling but fascinating; a sort of punk rock Sunset Boulevard". - Leonard Maltin Cast: Patti Astor, Eric Mitchell, Rene Ricard, Tom Wright, Cookie Mueller, Jackie Curtis, Taylor Mead, Steven Meisel
1995	On Seventh Avenue	Jeff Bleckner	Television pilot, 97 minutes	A fashion designer desperately attempts to rescue her father's apparel business, left in shambles by her brother. Rene Ricard in a role as a journalist. The NBC television network passed on developing the pilot into a series. Broadcast on NBC as a made-for-television movie in 1996.
1999	After the Fall	Michele Civetta	16 mm, color, 10 minutes	A father grieves over the loss of his wife after his indiscretions with a young girl. Rene Ricard plays the protagonist of the film and appears in every scene. Student film directed by Civetta while at New York University. Michele Civetta's later directing credits include an ambitious ad for Diesel Jeans and numerous music videos, including those for Lou Reed and Sparkle Horse.
2010	You Won't Miss Me	Ry Russo-Young	Color, 81 minutes	A kaleidoscopic film portrait of Shelly Brown, a twenty-three-year-old alienated urban misfit recently released from a psychiatric hospital. Starring Stella Schnabel, featuring Rene Ricard and introducing other notable New York personalities.
2014	Asthma	Jake Hoffman	Color	Directing debut by Jake Hoffman (son of Dustin Hoffman). Ricard plays an extravagantly over-the-top drug dealer named Juan.

== Recordings ==
Year	Title	Publisher	Notes
1980	Sugar, Alcholol & Meat: The Dial-A-Poet Poems	Giorno Poetry Systems	A double L.P. album; includes readings by Kathy Acker, Miguel Algarin, Beth Anderson, John Ashbey, Barbara Barg, Regina Beck, Charles Bernstein, Ted Berrigan, William S. Burroughs, William S. Burroughs Jr., John Cage, Tom Carey, Charlotte Carter, Didi Susan Dubelyew, Cliff Fyman, Allen Ginsberg, John Giorno, Daniera Gioseff, Bernard Heidsiek, Peter Gordon, Bob Holman, Rochelle Kraut, Mitchelle Kreigman, Steve MaCaffery, Robin Messing, Charlie Morrow, Eileen Myles, The Nuyorican Poets, Miguel Pinero, Ron Padgett, Patti Smith, Gary Snyder, Ned Sublette, Paul Violi, Andrei Vosnesensky, Anne Waldman. Rene Ricard reads Rene Ricard Famous at 20, recorded at The Saint Mark's Church New Year's Benefit, Entermedia Theater, New York City on January 1, 1979; a version of which was published in Rene Ricard 1979 - 1980 as The Party Manifesto.
2001	"Give Me Your Hump!" The Unspeakable Terry Southern Record	Koch Records	A collection of pieces by literary satirist Terry Southern, best known as the co-author of Dr. Stranglove. Contains a recording (c. 1990) of Terry Southern, Allen Ginsberg and Rene Ricard reading from Flash & Filigree (The Critic; 11:27 minutes).
