= The Lonely Doll =

1957 book by Dare Wright

- Author: Dare Wright
- Illustrator: Dare Wright
- Language: English
- Subject: Fiction
- Genre: Children's literature
- Publisher: Doubleday
- Publication date: 1957
- Media type: Print (Hardcover)
- Pages: 64
- ISBN: 9780395899267
- OCLC: 39890027
- Followed by: Holiday for Edith and the Bears

The Lonely Doll is the first children's book in a series by photographer and author Dare Wright. The story is told through text and photographs. It was first published by Doubleday in 1957, went out of print for years, was reissued by Houghton Mifflin in 1998, and brought out by Barnes & Noble in a narrated version for their Nook eReader in 2012. Wright wrote 10 books starring Edith and the bears. The nine that have been reprinted are The Lonely Doll, Edith and Mr. Bear, A Gift from the Lonely Doll, Holiday for Edith and the Bears, The Doll and the Kitten, Edith and the Duckling, Edith and Little Bear Lend a Hand, Edith and Midnight and The Lonely Doll Learns a Lesson.

== Plot ==
The Lonely Doll tells the story of a doll named Edith, who lives by herself until two teddy bears, called Mr. Bear and Little Bear, appear in her life. One day, Mr. Bear goes out for a walk leaving the two alone in the house; He returns to find they have rummaged in a closet for dress-up clothing, smeared themselves with makeup, and written "Mr. Bear is just a silly old thing" in lipstick on the mirror. Mr. Bear proceeds to discipline both Little Bear and Edith, leaving Edith to worry that he will take Little Bear and leave. Mr. Bear assures her that he will never, ever, leave her.

== Characters ==
Edith, the main character of many of her books, looks a great deal like Dare Wright herself, with a blonde pony tail and golden hoop earrings.

Edith was named after Dare's mother, Edith Stevenson Wright, a portrait artist.

== Controversy ==
When Houghton Mifflin reissued The Lonely Doll in 1998, it was not without a minor battle from colleagues, according to then children's book publisher Anita Silvey. At the core of the controversy was the scene in which Mr. Bear spanks Edith for misbehaving. As a result, some parents objected to the book. Other parents, such as critic and novelist Daphne Merkin and fashion designer Vera Wang, supported the book.

== Toys ==
The doll is a felt Lenci Doll from the 1920s which belonged to Dare as a child. She sewed Edith's outfits for the books and changed her eye color to blue, resembling the author's looks.

Mr. Bear was manufactured by Schuco, and Little Bear was a special edition Steiff, "Jackie Bear." Both were purchased in the 1950s with the help of Dare's brother, Blaine Wright.

The Rothschild Doll Company, founded by Mimi Rothschild and Howard Mandel, obtained a license directly from Dare Wright in 1985 to reproduce both a hard plastic and felt version of Edith The Lonely Doll. The Rothschild Doll Company manufactured a 22" felt Edith doll as originally produced by the Lenci company. She had human hair, painted face, a cotton pink checked dress and black suede shoes. Rothschild made an exclusive basket set containing the 22" felt doll, a Mohair joined teddy bear known as Mr. Bear and a 12" Mohair jointed Little Bear.

A new felt finished rendition of the Edith doll was manufactured in 2005 by the Alexander Doll Company, who made the first Edith doll in 1958. It was sold exclusively by The Toy Shoppe.

In 2007, R. John Wright (no relation to the book’s author) produced a limited edition felt Edith doll for collectors to celebrate the 50th anniversary of The Lonely Doll.

== Reception ==
The book was first published in 1957, and made the New York Times children's books best seller list. In November 2010, The British newspaper The Guardian named The Lonely Doll one of the 10 Best Illustrated Children's Books of all time.
