= Coffee bean (disambiguation) =

A coffee bean is a seed from the Coffea plant and the source for coffee.

Coffee bean may also refer to:

- The Coffee Bean & Tea Leaf, American coffee chain
- Coffee Bean Bears, a stuffed toy bear
- Melampus coffea, also called the coffee bean snail
- "Coffee Bean", a song by Travis Scott from Astroworld
