= Coffee Bean Bears =

Stuffed toy bear

- Company type: Privately held company
- Industry: Manufacturing, retail
- Founded: 2003
- Headquarters: Miami, Florida
- Key people: Christopher Esposito, President; Artie Esposito, Vice-President, Creative Director
- Products: Teddy bears
- Subsidiaries: ESPO Entertainment

Coffee Bean Bears were coffee bean-stuffed plush bears created by brothers Christopher Esposito and Artie Esposito in 2003. The initial assortment of bears featured four characters: Brewster Bean, Frenchie Vanilla, Mister Mocha, and Hazel "The Nut." Each of the bears' midsection is stuffed with coffee beans of the corresponding flavor aroma. The bears came packaged in a coffee tin and were sold with a numbered "coaster of authenticity." The bears are no longer in production.

Coffee Bean Bears were marketed towards adult teddy bear collectors or avid coffee drinkers. The beans were packaged in a netted bag placed in the back of the bear through a Velcro opening, and gave the stuffed animals a fragrant aroma through a porous burlap/jute material. The "Coaster of Authenticity" is made of the same burlap and includes a cartoon drawing of the matching bear. The coffee can packaging was printed with the story of the bear enclosed and a description of the beans.

Proceeds from the original sales of Coffee Bean Bears benefited the charity Coffee Kids.

The "Brewster Bean" bear was nominated for the 2007 Golden Teddy Award buy Jones Publishing in the "Dressed/Accessorized, 5-14 inches" category.

== "Brother" Bears ==
Will Kirby & Mike "Boogie" Malin with the Coffee Bean Bears

Two of the stars of CBS' Big Brother, Will Kirby (winner of Big Brother 2) and Mike "Boogie" Malin (winner of Big Brother All-Stars) were original investors in Coffee Bean Bears. Throughout the "All-Stars" season, Kirby and Malin would promote the product to internet fans via the 24-hour live video feeds and wearing merchandise featuring the bears.
