= Playbill =

American theatre magazine

- Editor: Diep Tran
- Categories: Theatre
- Frequency: Monthly
- Total circulation: 4,073,680 (2012)
- First issue: 1884; New Series 1982
- Company: Total Theater
- Country: United States
- Based in: New York City
- Language: English
- Website: www.playbill.com
- ISSN: 0551-0678
- OCLC: 1264051597

Playbill is an American monthly magazine for theatergoers. Although there is a subscription issue available for home delivery, most copies of Playbill are printed for particular productions and distributed at the door as the show's program.

Playbill was first printed in 1884 for a single theater on 21st Street in New York City. The magazine is now used at nearly every Broadway theatre as well as many Off-Broadway productions. Outside New York City, Playbill is used at theaters throughout the United States. As of September 2012, its circulation was 4,073,680.

== History ==
Cover of The Playbill for a 1939 production of No Time for Comedy starring Katharine Cornell

What is known today as Playbill started in 1884, when Frank Vance Strauss founded the New York Theatre Program Corporation specializing in printing theater programs. Strauss reimagined the concept of a theater program, making advertisements a standard feature and thus transforming what was then a leaflet into a fully designed magazine. The new format proved popular with theatergoers, who started to collect playbills as souvenirs; however, the name (The) Playbill did not appear until the 1930s; earlier programs published by the company simply bore the name of the venue.

In 1918, Frank Vance Strauss sold the company to his nephew, Richard M. Huber. From 1918 onward, the company started printing playbills for all of Broadway and, by 1924, was printing 16,000,000 programs for over 60 theaters. The 1920s also saw attempts to introduce consistency in the design with the covers of the magazines featuring artwork representing the theater, which would stay the same from show to show. In 1934–35, the name The Playbill made its first appearance on the cover although there was still no standard logo in that period. The design underwent a series of transformations with show titles occasionally switching places with The Playbill logo in various places on the cover until the magazine's logo found its permanent place at the top of the front cover. The magazine was purchased by Roger L. Stevens in 1956. The publication as it is known today became Playbill in 1957, under then-owner Gilman Kraft. The publication has been owned by the Arthur T. Birsh family since 1973. Production and printing of the magazine takes place in Woodside, Queens.

== Format ==
Each issue features articles focusing on actors, new plays, musicals, and special attractions. This "wraparound" section is the same for all Playbills at all venues each month. Within this wraparound, the Playbill contains listings, photos, and biographies of the cast; biographies of authors, composers, and production staff; a list of scenes, as songs and their performers (for musicals); and a brief description of the setting for the particular show. It also lists the number of intermissions and "At This Theatre", a column with historical information on the theater housing the production. The Playbill distributed on opening night of a Broadway show is stamped with a seal on the cover and the date appears on the title page within the magazine. This is, however, not the case for every opening night playbill: there are many in circulation that do not feature the date.

In lieu of the cast and show information, the subscription edition of Playbill contains listings of Broadway and Off-Broadway productions and news from London productions and North American touring companies.

The Playbill banner is yellow with black writing. Each June since 2014, the yellow banner has been replaced with a rainbow banner for LGBT Pride Month.

The Playbill banner has changed the yellow to another color on rare occasions in its history:

- October 2008 – green for the fifth anniversary of Wicked
- October 2011 – royal blue for the tenth anniversary of Mamma Mia!
- October 2013 – green for the tenth anniversary of Wicked
- April 2018 – white and red for the fifth anniversary of Kinky Boots
- November 2021 – black for the 25th anniversary of Chicago

== Other media ==
Playbill launched Playbill Online in January 1994. The free website offers news about the theater industry, focusing on New York shows but including regional theater, touring, and international stage happenings. It is read by show fans and theater practitioners, and is updated regularly. It also offers discounts on tickets and dining for its members.

In 2000, Playbill added www.playbillstore.com, an online shopping store offering official Playbill merchandise and merchandise from most current Broadway and touring productions.

In 2006, Playbill released its first records on Playbill Records, an imprint of Sony BMG. Releases included Brian Stokes Mitchell's eponymous solo album and two compilations of show tunes entitled Scene Stealers, The Men and Scene Stealers, The Women.

Playbill Radio, a 24-hour Broadway-themed internet radio station featuring news, podcasts, and a musical library of over 20,000 titles, premiered in 2007.

In 2011, Playbill launched Playbill Vault, a comprehensive online database of Broadway history. Playbill Vault provides records of Broadway productions from 1930 to the present. Information on the website includes original and current casts, actor head shots, production credits, Playbill cover images, scanned Playbill Who's Who pages, production photos, and videos.

In 2012, Playbill launched Playbill Memory Bank, a website that allowed theater-goers to track their memories of their theater attendances by entering dates they attended a show, along with information like ticket scans. The site provided information about cast members, including which performer had each particular role, for roles that may have had several replacements over the life of the show. Playbill Memory Bank shut down December 31, 2016.

Playbill launched its first app, called Playbill Passport, on January 4, 2016.

In 2021, Playbill added a "post-the-pay" rule to their job site after a campaign by On Our Team and Costume Professionals for Wage Equity called for an increased pay transparency and equity in the theater industry.

== Competition with Stagebill ==
For decades, Playbill concentrated on Broadway and Off-Broadway theaters, while Stagebill focused on concerts, opera, and dance in venues such as Lincoln Center and Carnegie Hall. However, by the late 1990s, Playbill was highly profitable; Stagebill was not, losing millions of dollars annually by 1998. To increase revenue, Stagebill entered Playbill's turf. The truce was first breached in 1995, when The Public Theater quietly defected to Stagebill, and more noisily in 1997, when Disney contracted Stagebill for its musical The Lion King at its newly reopened New Amsterdam Theatre. The main point of contention in the latter case was control over advertising content: Playbill is distributed free to theaters, relying on advertising revenue that is completely under its authority, whereas Disney, per company policy, required a program without cigarette or liquor ads.

In response to Stagebill's upstart incursion, Playbill began to produce Showbill, a sister publication that conformed to Disney's advertising requirements for all publications distributed in its properties. Now with an alternative, Disney switched from Stagebill to Showbill for The Lion King late in its run at the New Amsterdam. (When the musical moved to the Minskoff Theatre, which Disney does not own, it was obligated to use Playbill, as are Disney productions at other theaters.) The Ford Center for the Performing Arts also commissioned Showbill for its inaugural production of Ragtime, presumably to exclude other automakers' ads. In a different circumstance, the producers of the Broadway revival of Cabaret wished to maintain the atmosphere of a sleazy nightclub at its Studio 54 venue, and insisted on handing out Playbills after the performance (instead of before). Playbill, sensing missed exposure for its advertisers, offered the show's producers "Showbill" instead.

Additionally, Playbill responded further by producing publications for classic arts venues, aggressively courting many venues that were once Stagebill clients. In the spring of 2002, Playbill signed a contract with Carnegie Hall; this milestone was bookended by the earlier acquisition of the valuable Metropolitan Opera program and the ensuing contract with the New York Philharmonic—both tenants of Stagebill's erstwhile stronghold Lincoln Center. With the acquisition of the programs for performing arts venues, Playbill broke from its typical format and began publishing completely customized programs in the vein of Stagebill. This, coupled with continuing fiscal troubles, signaled the end of Stagebill as a publishing entity; later that year, Stagebill became insolvent after five years of head-to-head competition with Playbill, which acquired the Stagebill trademark.

== Museum of Broadway ==
Playbill is a founding member of the Museum of Broadway.
