= Bop (magazine) =

Defunct American entertainment magazine for children and teens

- Cover of the June 1989 issue, featuring Debbie Gibson, Corey Haim, New Kids on the Block, Alyssa Milano, Johnny Depp, and Kirk Cameron
- Categories: Teenage
- Frequency: Monthly
- First issue: 1983
- Final issue: July 2014
- Company: Laufer Media
- Country: United States
- Language: English

Bop magazine was a monthly American entertainment magazine for children 10 years of age and teenagers. It began publication in the summer of 1983 and was published by Laufer Media, which also publishes Tiger Beat magazine. The headquarters of Bop was in Studio City, California.

Popular features included articles, mini-mags, interviews, and the Fly Free To Hollywood contest, where readers had to correctly guess the stars, whether it was identifying their eyes, finding their names in a word search, or identifying them by their hair (the photos had the celebrities with their faces blacked out). A spinoff magazine, Big Bopper, later called BB, was released in the fall of 1986 and was published until 2000. Bop and Tiger Beat were very similar, as they share an editor and feature the same celebrities. Bop was sold by its founders (Julie Jenkins, Teena Naumann, Kerry Laufer and Scott Laufer) to Primedia (now Rent Group) in 1998. Primedia sold it (along with Tiger Beat) to Scott Laufer in 2003. Bop ceased publication in July 2014.
