= The Andy Warhol Story =

- Directed by: Andy Warhol
- Produced by: Andy Warhol
- Starring: Edie Sedgwick; Rene Ricard
- Distributed by: The Factory
- Release date: November 1966
- Running time: 20 minutes
- Country: United States
- Language: English

The Andy Warhol Story is a 1966 underground film directed by Andy Warhol with cinematography by Paul Morrissey, and starring Edie Sedgwick and Rene Ricard (as Andy Warhol).

According to the Warhol Stars website, the film was made in November 1966, and is two reels long.

== See also ==
- Andy Warhol filmography
