= Redfin =

Real estate brokerage

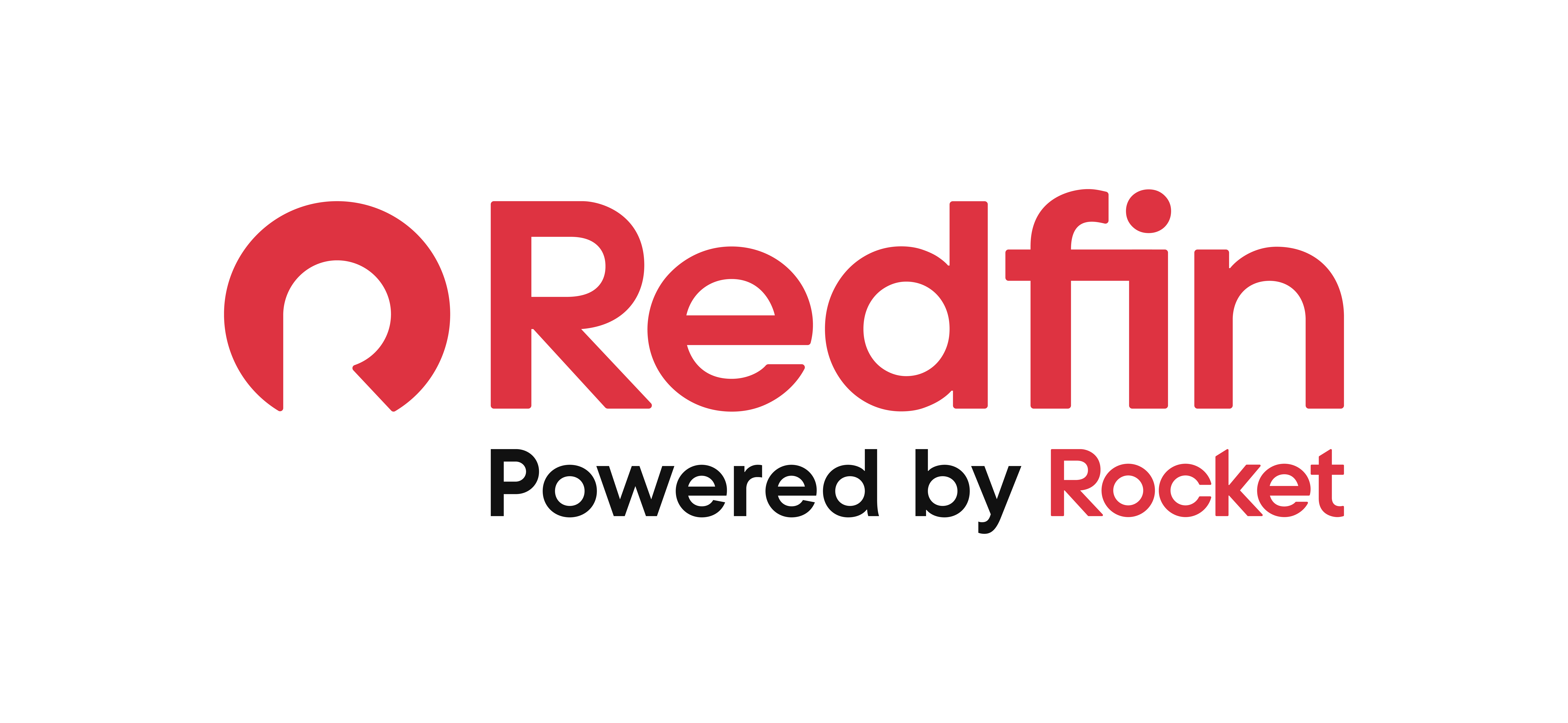

- Screenshot of Redfin map browser
- Type: Subsidiary
- Industry: Real estate
- Founded: 2004; 22 years ago Seattle, Washington, U.S.
- Founders: David Eraker; Michael Dougherty; David Selinger
- Headquarters: Seattle, Washington, U.S.
- Area served: 100+ markets in the United States and Canada
- Key people: Alessio Sanfilippo (CEO); Bridget Frey (CTO); Chris Nielsen (CFO)
- Services: Real estate agent Broker; Mortgage origination
- Parent: Rocket Companies
- Subsidiaries: Rent Group
- Website: redfin.com

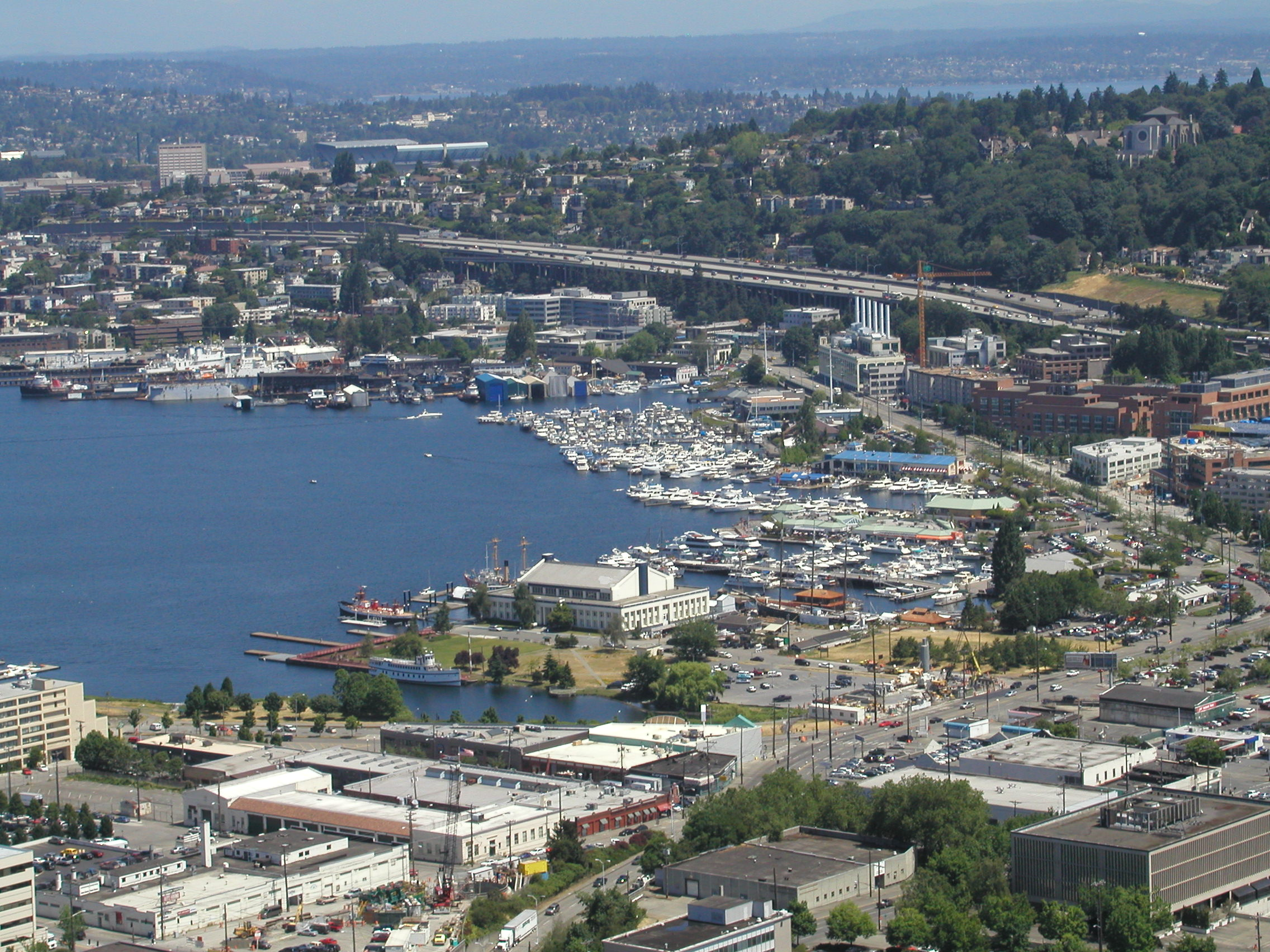
Redfin headquarters are in the Hill7 Building, in South Lake Union, Seattle

Redfin, a subsidiary of Rocket Companies, provides real estate agent services for buying, selling, and renting homes in the United States and Canada.

== History ==
Redfin was founded in 2004 by David Eraker, Michael Dougherty, and David Selinger. Eraker had dropped out of medical school at the University of Washington for a career in software design, and Dougherty received degrees in electrical engineering and international studies from Yale University. David Selinger, an alumnus of Stanford University who had previously led the research and development arm of Amazon's data mining and personalization team, joined Redfin as the third founder and CTO. Selinger helped build Redfin's mapping and real estate data analytics engine.

Redfin launched a map-based real estate search site in Seattle in 2004.

In September 2005, Redfin named Glenn Kelman as CEO.

Redfin launched home-buying and selling services in Seattle and the Bay Area in 2006. The following year, Redfin expanded to Southern California, Boston, Baltimore and Washington, DC. Redfin offered flat fee pricing for sellers and commission refunds for buyers.

In 2011, Redfin launched a tool to allow consumers to see a real estate agent's sales history. After it drew criticism for using inaccurate data, the system was discontinued.

In 2015, Redfin launched the Redfin Estimate, an automated valuation tool, and Book it Now, and on-demand service for home tours.

In June 2017, the company began Redfin Now, a home flipping division.

On July 28, 2017, Redfin became a public company via an initial public offering, raising $138 million.

In June 2019, Redfin began allowing buyers to submit offers on homes listed by Redfin's selling agents without using a buyer's agent. A month later, the company partnered with Opendoor, whereby visitors to the Redfin website can request an offer to buy their houses from Opendoor.

Redfin entered the rental market with acquisition of RentPath in 2021.

In June 2022, the company announced layoffs of 8% of its staff.

In November 2022, the company announced additional layoffs of 862 people, or 13% of its staff, and the wind down of its Redfin Now home flipping unit.

In July 2025, the company was acquired by Rocket Companies.

=== Acquisitions ===
Date	Acquired	Description	Cost	Source
October 2014	Walk Score	Analysis and apartment search tool	N/A	
April 2021	RentPath (now Rent Group)	Owner of Apartment Guide, Rent.com, Lovely, and Rentals.com	$608 million	
April 2022	Bay Equity Home Loans	Mortgage lender	$137.8 million	

== Fines and litigation ==
In May 2007, Redfin was fined $50,000 by the Northwest Multiple Listing Service, and was forced to shut down reviews of homes on the market on its website, prohibited under multiple listing service rules.

In November 2020, a lawsuit by several fair housing organizations accused Redfin of violating the Fair Housing Act by offering fewer services to homebuyers and sellers in minority communities and not offering to sell lower-priced homes because of the lower profits on such sales. In 2022, the company paid $4 million to settle the lawsuit, changed its policies, and implemented a new internal monitoring system.

== See also ==
- National Association of Realtors
- List of online real estate databases
