= Rent.com =

Apartment search engine and online marketplace

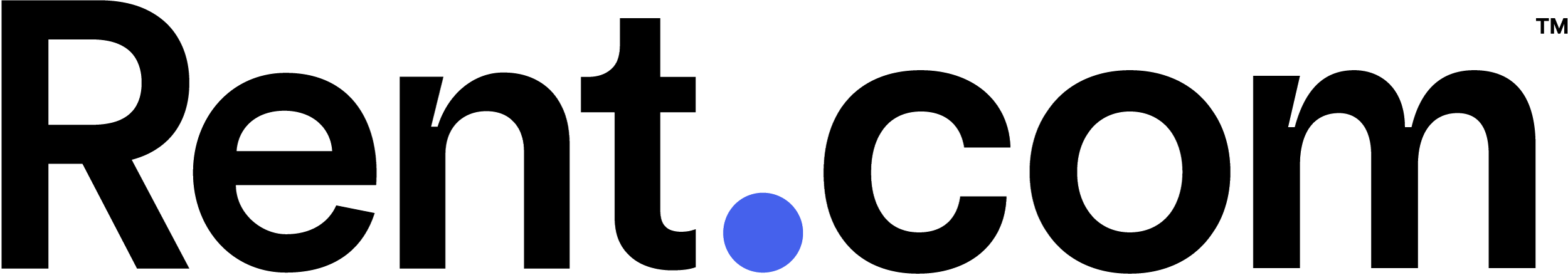
- Website type: Apartment search engine, Online marketplace
- Owner: Redfin
- Website: www.rent.com
- Commercial: Yes
- Launched: 1999; 27 years ago
- Current status: Active

Rent.com is an apartment search engine and online marketplace for finding rental apartments. It is owned by Rent Group (stylized as Rent), which is owned by Redfin.

== Timeline ==
Rent.com was founded in 1999 as Viva.com. In December 2004, eBay purchased Rent.com for $415 million.

In May 2012, Rent Group, then known as Primedia, acquired Rent.com from eBay for an undisclosed amount.

In June 2015, as part of an overall re-branding of Rent.com, the site launched its first national advertising campaign featuring comedian and actor J. B. Smoove.

In April 2021, Rent Group, which owns Rent.com, was acquired by Redfin after filing for bankruptcy in 2020.

== See also ==
- Fractional renting
- Short-term rental
- Rental utilization
