= Hanuman Books =

Small press founded in 1986

Hanuman Books logo created by Francesco Clemente

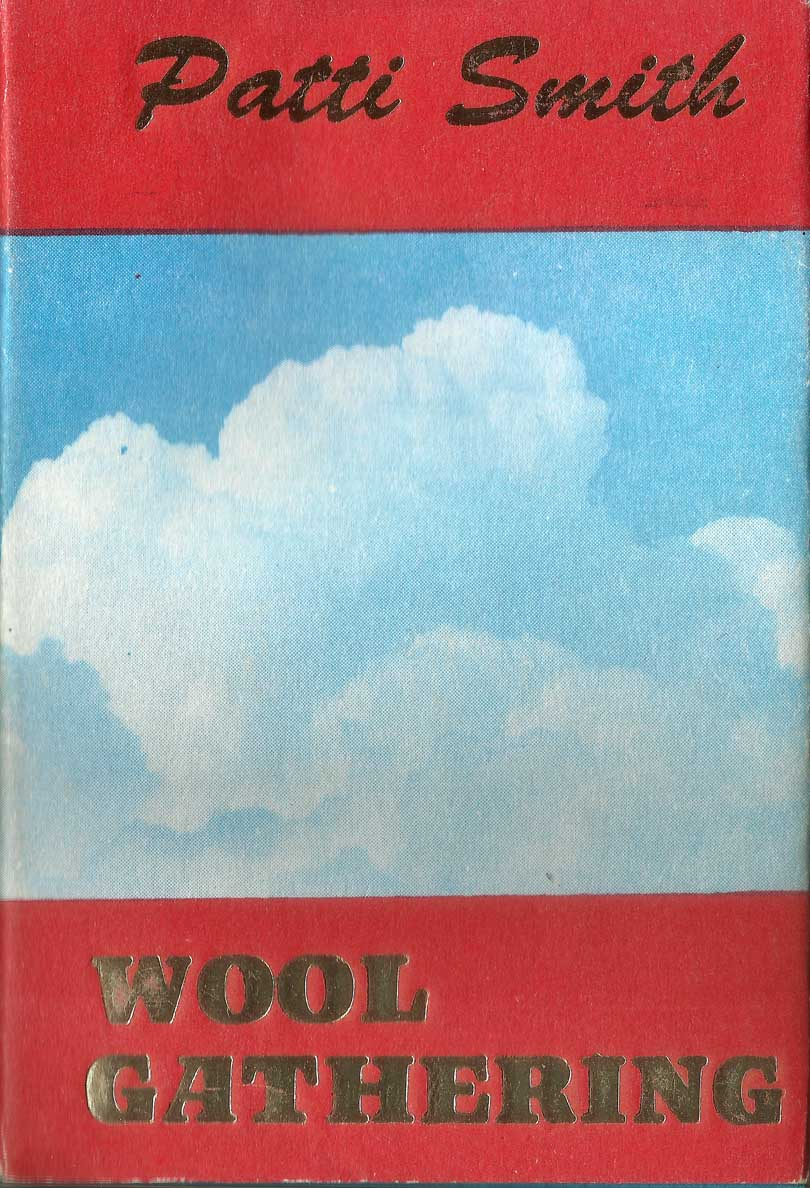
cover of Patti Smith's Hanuman Book Woolgathering (1992)

Hanuman Books (named after the Hindu monkey god Hanuman) was a small press founded in 1986 by American art critic Raymond Foye and artist Francesco Clemente in New York City. It was originally a 50 book series of very small books, formatted to resemble Indian prayer books that Clemente introduced to Foye during a trip to India. The original series ran from 1986 to 1993.

The series concentrated on avant-garde cultural values of the 1980s and included Dada writings, Beat poetry, Naropa Institute poets, Andy Warhol's Factory scene, San Francisco's North Beach literary scene and members of New York's art and literary scene, such as Patti Smith. Radical French authors, such as Jean Genet, Henri Michaux, René Daumal and Francis Picabia were mixed with Lower East Side writers like William Burroughs, Nick Zedd and Gary Indiana. Hanuman books were printed at C.T. Nachiappan's Kalakshetra Press in Madras, India.

The series has since acquired a cult following and in 2014, writer and art historian Shruti Belliappa founded Hanuman Editions, reimagining the Hanuman Books legacy. She co-edits the project with writer Joshua Rothes. As of 2023, new authors like McKenzie Wark, Vivek Narayanan, Bora Chung, Enrique Vila-Matas and Raymond Pettibon are being added to the original series and some original titles are being reissued, like Eileen Myles' Bread and Water and Cookie Mueller's Garden of Ashes.

== History ==
Artist Francesco Clemente drew the Hanuman logo and conceptualized the overall design of the book series. Twelve books a year were published with Foye often selecting American writers like Allen Ginsberg, John Ashbery, Bob Dylan, Robert Creeley and Taylor Mead while Clemente often chose French texts in English translation by writers such as René Daumal and Henri Michaux. Hanuman also published texts by visual artists Max Beckmann, David Hockney, Willem de Kooning, Jack Smith and Francis Picabia.

In India at C.T. Nachiappan's Kalakshetra Press, located at Madras (now Chennai), Hanuman Books were printed on a letterpress and shipped by boat to New York City. Nachiappan’s expertise gave Hanuman volumes a distinct look and feel, a tactile object-like quality that grounded their critically deconstructive approach to the countercultural currents of the late twentieth century. All of the books had the same 3 in × 4 in (76 mm × 102 mm) dimensions, except for René Ricard's larger book God with Revolver.

Besides being sold for four or five dollars on an informal basis from the Chelsea Hotel, Printed Matter, Inc. and occasionally from art museum bookstores and art galleries in Manhattan; book distributors Sun and Moon Press (in Los Angeles) and Small Press Distribution (in Berkeley) placed Hanuman books in West Coast bookstores, such as City Lights Bookstore and in contemporary art museums, such as the Los Angeles County Museum of Art.

Hanuman Books held a historic reading on May 18, 1989, at St. Mark's Church in New York. Over a dozen writers, including Allen Ginsberg, Richard Hell, Eileen Myles, and others read selections from their works.

== List of titles ==
Series I (1-6)
John Wieners, Superficial Estimation
David Trinidad, November
Eileen Myles, Bread and Water
Taylor Mead, Son of Andy Warhol
Francis Picabia, Who Knows
Henri Michaux, By Surprise

Series II (7-12)
Amy Gerstler, Primitive Man
John Ashbery, The Ice Storm
Herbert Huncke, Guilty of Everything
Manuel Rosenthal, Satie, Ravel, Poulenc
René Daumal, A Fundamental Experiment
John Wieners, Conjugal Contraries & Quart

Series III (13-18)
Bob Flanagan, Fuck Journal
Willem de Kooning, Collected Writings
Cookie Mueller, Fan Mail, Frank Letters, and Crank Calls
Sandro Penna, Confused Dream
Vincent Katz, Cabal of Zealots
Alain Danielou, Fools of God

Series IV (19-24)
Edwin Denby, Willem de Kooning
Max Beckmann, On My Painting
Gary Indiana, White Trash Boulevard
Jean Genet, Rembrandt
David Trinidad, Three Stories
Allen Ginsberg, Your Reason and Blake's System

Series V (25-30)
René Guénon, Oriental Metaphysics
Eileen Myles, 1969
Gregory Corso, Mind Field
René Daumal, The Lie of the Truth
Elaine Equi, Views Without Rooms
Ronald Firbank, Firbankiana

Series VI (31-36)
David Hockney, Picasso
St. Teresa/Simone Weil, On the Lord's Prayer
Jack Smith, Historical Treasures
Cookie Mueller, Garden of Ashes
Beauregard Houston-Montgomery, Pouf Pieces
Bob Dylan, Saved! The Gospel Speeches of Bob Dylan

Series VII (37-42)
Richard Hell, Artifact: Notebooks from Hell 1974-1980
Henry Geldzahler, Looking at Pictures
Francis Picabia, Yes No
Robert Creeley, Autobiography
Dodie Bellamy, Feminine Hijinx
Jack Kerouac, Safe in Heaven Dead

Series VIII (43-48)
Candy Darling, Candy Darling
Nick Zedd, Bleed Part One
Patti Smith, Woolgathering
William Burroughs, Painting and Guns
Robert Hunter, Idiot's Delight
Robert Frank, One Hour

Unnumbered
Jack Kerouac, Manhattan Sketches
René Ricard, God with Revolver

== Recognition ==
Matthew Erikson described the seven-year print run as "The Hanuman canon”, a publishing endeavour that articulated a new vision of a possible avant-garde lineage in its short life span between 1986 and 1993, linking the energies and efforts of the eighties Lower East Side with threads from earlier poets, painters, musicians, and thinkers. If you were to line up the whole Hanuman pantheon on a shelf chronologically and take a random core sample of a few titles ... you would be mining several distinct trajectories of literature, art, music, and underground culture from the past century."
