= David McCabe (photographer) =

British photographer (1940–2021)

- Born: David Edward McCabe; 14 November 1940; Leicester, England
- Died: 26 February 2021 (aged 80); Albany, New York, U.S.
- Education: Leicester Colleges of Art and Technology
- Occupation: Photographer
- Spouses: Christine Scott (divorced) Susan Cipolla (m. 1999)
- Children: 2

David Edward McCabe (14 November 1940 – 26 February 2021) was a British fashion photographer. He was noted for photographing Andy Warhol throughout 1964.

== Early life ==
McCabe was born in Leicester, England, on 14 November 1940. His father, Leslie, fought during World War II in the Battle of El Alamein; his mother, Phyllis (Hancock), was a housewife. He studied graphic design and photography at the Leicester Colleges of Art and Technology. While in art school he won an international photo competition sponsored by the magazine Practical Photography and was hired by the Mayflower photo studio in London.

== Career ==
McCabe moved to New York City in 1960. There, he worked first as an assistant and studied under Alexey Brodovitch, Henry Wolf, and Melvin Sokolsky. He subsequently received his first assignment with Condé Nast Publications in 1963, and took photos for its magazines such as Glamour and Mademoiselle. He was also responsible for introducing Donyale Luna to the world of fashion modeling.

McCabe's work caught the attention of Andy Warhol in 1964. Warhol commissioned McCabe to document a year in his life, after informally interviewing him at The Factory. McCabe later admitted in 2011 that he "didn’t even know who Andy Warhol was" at the time. The two would typically meet at five in the afternoon, before heading out and speaking infrequently to one another for the rest of the night. Warhol's only request was that McCabe not utilize flash, since he did not want it to be apparent that he had a personal photographer. McCabe ultimately captured Warhol in various settings, such as at parties and gallery openings. One noted photograph was of Warhol and Salvador Dalí sharing a glass of wine at the St. Regis New York, with the latter deafeningly playing opera music to the point that his room trembled. He was also able to document some of Warhol's private moments that unmasked his inner life.

The 400 duotone photos were published in 2003 as A Year in the Life of Andy Warhol. Many of them had never before been revealed to the public. This is because neither Warhol nor McCabe did anything with the photographs after they were developed. They remained in a drawer at McCabe's studio until around 2000, when The Andy Warhol Museum contacted him after learning about the pictures.

McCabe subsequently did fashion and commercial photography. His photos were published in Life, Harper's Bazaar, W, French Elle, French Vogue, and The Times. Although he lost contact with Warhol, they eventually reconnected shortly before the latter's death in 1987.

David McCabe's images continue to be exhibited in some of the most prestigious museums around the world.

== Personal life ==
McCabe's first marriage to Christine Scott ended in divorce. They had a son, Mathew. He married Susan Cipolla in 1999. Susan and David had a daughter, Lily Luna. They remained married until his death.

McCabe died on 26 February 2021 at a hospital in Albany, New York from lung cancer. He was 80.
