= Bill Reilly =

American publishing and media executive (1938–2008)

William Francis Reilly (June 8, 1938 – October 17, 2008) was an American publishing and media executive who was the founder and former chairman of Primedia (now Rent Group). During Reilly's time at the helm of Primedia, the firm built a collection of more than 200 magazines that included American Baby, National Hog Farmer, Chicago and New York.

== Life and career ==
Reilly was born in Manhattan, New York City, on June 8, 1938, to a father who was a stockbroker. He attended the Iona Preparatory School in New Rochelle, New York, earned an undergraduate degree cum laude from the University of Notre Dame and received an MBA from Harvard University Graduate School of Business Administration. Reilly served in the United States Army from 1959 to 1961, attaining the rank of lieutenant.

Reilly spent time at W.R. Grace and Company as a financial analyst. He later was named to head the company's home products, sporting goods, and textiles divisions.

After joining Macmillan as executive vice president, he was named president of the firm in 1980. His responsibilities included book publishing and the firm's Berlitz and Katherine Gibbs schools.

Reilly left Macmillan in 1990, following the firm's purchase by Robert Maxwell's Maxwell Communications, and was succeeded by David Shaffer as the company's president and chief operating officer. Reilly become president and chief executive of K-III Holdings, in which the private equity firm of Kohlberg Kravis Roberts held a 75% ownership stake.

The company made a series of acquisitions of niche publications under Reilly's leadership. The firm went public in 1995, selling stock 15 million shares at approximately $12 per share, in a deal that left Kohlberg Kravis Roberts with control of 82.2% of the company's shares. The firm adopted the Primedia name as of November 18, 1997 to more clearly focus on its core business. Primedia sold a group of 17 outdoor-oriented magazines to InterMedia Outdoors for $170 million in cash, in a deal that included Guns and Ammo and Fly Fisherman. Primedia sold its Enthusiast Media division to Source Interlink in a deal that netted Primedia $1.15 billion in cash in exchange for a group of more than 70 magazines, including Motor Trend and Soap Opera Digest and 90 consumer web sites. The deal left Primedia to focus on a series of free consumer guides published by its Consumer Source unit.

In 1996, Reilly fired Kurt Andersen from his position as editor-in-chief of New York magazine, citing the publication's financial results. Andersen attributed the firing to his refusal to kill a story about a rivalry between investment bankers Felix Rohatyn and Steven Rattner that had upset Henry Kravis, a member of the firm's ownership group.

== Personal life and death ==
He married Ellen Chapman in November 1966, which ended in divorce. Reilly died of bone cancer and prostate cancer at the Waldorf-Astoria Hotel, where he had been receiving hospice care.
