= Woolgathering (book) =

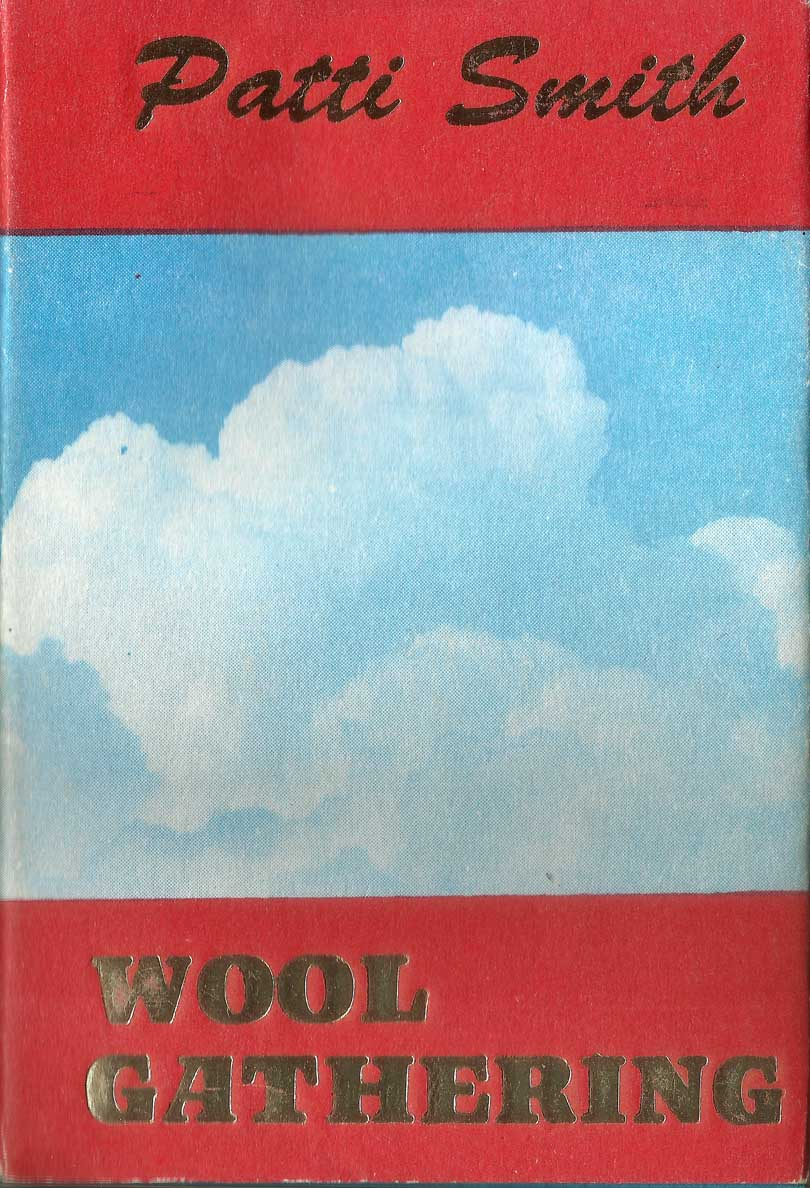
- Cover of the 1992 edition
- Author: Patti Smith
- Language: English
- Genre: Prose poetry
- Publisher: Hanuman Books
- Publication date: June 1992
- Publication place: United States
- Media type: Paperback
- Pages: 80
- ISBN: 978-0-937815-47-2
- OCLC: 26954565

Woolgathering is a poetry collection by Patti Smith, published by Hanuman Books in 1992. In 2012 she published a 20th anniversary edition with additional material. The book was reissued again in 2021.

The original publication was part of a series of small (approximately 3 inch by 4 inch) books published by Hanuman Books from New York's Hotel Chelsea. The slim book consists of eleven semi-autobiographical prose poems, and was written while Smith was living in Michigan, largely out of the public eye. The poems are interspersed with black-and-white photographs.

== Contents ==
1. "A Bidding"
2. "The Woolgatherers"
3. "Barndance"
4. "Cowboy Truths"
5. "Indian Rubies"
6. "Drawing"
7. "Art in Heaven"
8. "Flying"
9. "A Farewell"
