= Doll Reader =

Defunct American collectors magazine

- Editor: Kathryn Peck
- Categories: Hobbyist
- Frequency: 8x year
- Publisher: Hobby House Press/Riverdale (Dec/Jan. 1973–Jan. 1992); Cowles Enthusiast Media/Cumberland Publishing, Inc. (Feb. 1992–May 1998); Primedia (now Rent Group) (June 1998–Oct. 2002); Ashton International Media, Inc. (Nov. 2002–May 2004); Madavor Media, LLC (June 2004–2012)
- Founded: December 1972; 53 years ago
- Final issue: 2012
- Country: United States
- Language: English

Doll Reader was a collectors magazine in the United States, appearing eight times a year. It included information on antique dolls, collectible and modern dolls, and offerings from manufacturers and contemporary doll artists. The last publisher of Doll Reader was Madavor Media, LLC, in Quincy, Massachusetts.

== Publication history ==
Doll Reader began publication in 1972, originally put out by Hobby House Press. The founding editor was Paul A. Ruddell.

In October 2010, Haute Doll — a fashion doll collector's magazine — was merged into Doll Reader.

Doll Reader merged with DOLL in 2012.
