= Four by Two =

Literary magazine

Four by Two was a handmade miniature (5”x4”) international literary magazine, recognizable by its varied folding patterns, distinctive logo, and rounded edges. From 2014 to 2017, it was published, edited, designed, and produced quarterly by klipschutz (pen name of Kurt Lipschutz) and Jeremy Gaulke.

The complete 12-issue run was purchased by UC Berkeley’s Bancroft Library for inclusion in its Special Collections.

Four by Two

== Background ==
The magazine featured a mixture of voices, including translations from the German, Arabic (two Palestinian women poets), and Spanish. It mixed underknown underground figures with more establishment voices, two state poets laureate, and rare treasures from the famous dead. The editors worked on two issues with literary executor Raymond Foye.
