= Stagebill =

American theatre magazine

Stagebill was a monthly U.S. magazine for theatregoers. Most copies of the publication were printed for particular productions and distributed at the door as the show's program. It was launched as a direct rival to the highly successful monthly Playbill. But after five years of head-to-head competition with Playbill, Stagebill became insolvent and was acquired by its rival which also kept the Stagebill trademark.

== History ==
Stagebill was launched in 1927 as a direct competition to Playbill, a highly successful publication. Playbill concentrated on Broadway and Off-Broadway theaters, while Stagebill positioned itself as a publication focused on concerts, opera, and dance in venues such as Lincoln Center and Carnegie Hall.

B&B Enterprises, Inc. acquired Stagebill in 1969. The company owned the magazine until 1994 when it was acquired by K-III Communications based in New York City. In the 1990s Shira Kalish was the publisher of the magazine. She was succeeded by Darcy Miller Donaldson in the post.

However, by the late 1990s, Playbill was extremely profitable; Stagebill was not, losing millions of dollars annually by 1998. To increase revenue, Stagebill entered Playbill's turf. Its first major attempt was in 1995 when The Public Theater defected to Stagebill. A bigger rift came in 1997, when Disney contracted Stagebill for its big musical production The Lion King at the newly reopened New Amsterdam Theatre. The main point of contention in the latter case was control over advertising content. Playbill is distributed free to theaters relying on advertising revenue that is completely under its authority, whereas, per company policy, Disney required a program without cigarette or liquor ads. In response to Stagebill's upstart incursion, Playbill began to produce Showbill, a sister publication that conformed to Disney's advertising requirements for all publications distributed in its properties. Playbill responded further by producing publications for classic arts venues, aggressively courting many venues that were once Stagebill clients like the Metropolitan Opera, the Carnegie Hall and the New York Philharmonic.

With a more aggressive policy of acquiring publicity for more performing arts venues, Playbill broke from its typical format and began publishing completely customized programs in the vein of Stagebill. This, coupled with continuing fiscal troubles of Stagebill, led to the end of it as a publishing entity. Stagebill became insolvent in summer 2002, and in June 2002 it was acquired by its rival Playbill which also kept the Stagebill trademark.
