= Truckin' Magazine =

American sport truck magazine

- Categories: Automobile
- Frequency: Out of Print
- Publisher: Source Interlink
- Total circulation (2011): 80,052
- First issue: Summer 1975
- Country: United States
- Based in: Anaheim, CA
- Language: English
- Website: truckinweb.com
- ISSN: 0277-5743

Truckin' Magazine was a sport truck magazine published by TEN: The Enthusiast Network.

== History ==
In 1974, then-publisher of Street Rodder and Street Chopper magazines, Tom McMullen, saw a growing trend in custom vans and pickups cruising around the Southern California street rod shows. Using the popular saying "Keep on Truckin'" as a basis, Truckin’ magazine was created. In 1975, the first issue went on sale at newsstands for $1.00 under the TRM Publications (which stood for Tom and Rose McMullen) family of auto magazines. From 1975 to May 1995, Truckin’ was published by McMullen Publications and McMullen-Yee Publishing. It was purchased by K-III (now Rent Group) in June 1995 in a merger worth $55 million. In 2007, Source Interlink Media acquired more than 78 consumer magazines, including Truckin’. In December 2019, the Motor Trend Group, the final company that published Truckin', announced that Truckin' would cease publication along with 18 other magazines.

== Editors ==
Robert K. Smith, the production manager with Street Rodder magazine, headed up the inaugural issue of Truckin’. This also included managing editor Steve Stillwell, who in 1985 would run the title into the late 1990s. Other editors include Dick DeLoach, Kevin Wilson, Dan Sanchez (2000–2002), Steve Warner (2002–2008), and Dan Ward (2008–2014). The final Editor-in-Chief was Jeremy Cook (2014–2020).

== Frequency and sales ==
In 1975, the first issue was to be a "one-shot," a publishing term for once a year. The magazine was immediately turned into a quarterly, and within one year it was monthly. In 2003 Truckin’ added an extra issue entitled the "Fall Issue." In 2004, it was called the "Spring Issue," and has since been dubbed "Issue 13".

At the peak of magazine sales, the magazine was more than 440 pages.

Circulation

257,300 in 2002

90,752 in 2012
