= Dare Wright =

Children's author, model, and photographer

- Born: December 3, 1914; Vaughan, Ontario, Canada
- Died: January 25, 2001 (aged 86); New York City, U.S.
- Occupations: Photographer; author; model
- Years active: 1957–1981
- Website: darewright.com

Dare Wright (December 3, 1914 – January 25, 2001) was a Canadian–American children's author, model, and photographer. She is best known for her 1957 children's book, The Lonely Doll.

== Early life ==
Wright was born in 1914 in the Thornhill section of Vaughan, Ontario, Canada, but grew up in Cleveland, Ohio, United States. Her parents divorced when she was young, and she was raised by her mother, portrait artist Edith Stevenson Wright. Her brother, Blaine, went to live with their father, Ivan Wright, a theater critic in New York City. The siblings did not meet again until Dare moved to New York City in her twenties. Wright spent her formative years in Cleveland Heights.

Wright graduated from Laurel School in Shaker Heights in 1933 at the top of her class. She relocated to New York to attend the American Academy of Dramatic Arts. In 1935, she was cast in a small role as a maid in a stage production of Pride and Prejudice, which she performed in Washington, D.C. and on Broadway.

== Career ==
In 1957, she photographed her childhood Lenci doll, Edith, along with two teddy bears bought at FAO Schwarz, for her first children's book, titled The Lonely Doll. The book made The New York Times Best Seller list for children's books. In November 2010, The British newspaper The Guardian named The Lonely Doll as one of the 10 Best Illustrated Children's Books of all time.

Wright followed it with eighteen other stories. Out of print for many years, it was reissued in 1998, introducing Wright to a new generation of readers.

Another children's work, Lona: A Fairy Tale, features photographs of Wright dressed as a fairy princess, while using another doll in identical costume to give the illusion that Wright's character has been "transformed" to doll-size by a wicked wizard. Make Me Real, which features another of Wright's childhood dolls, and Ocracoke in The Fifties, her only book written for adults, have been published posthumously.

Dare Wright's photographs were exhibited for the first time in 2012 by Fred Torres Collaborations.

== Personal life ==
Throughout her adulthood, Wright remained close to her mother and never married despite receiving a number of proposals. Her brother, to whom she also was very attached, was estranged from their mother. Her mother died in 1975 and her brother in 1985. She was admitted to Goldwater Memorial Hospital on Roosevelt Island in May 1995 after suffering respiratory failure. She remained hospitalized for the next five and a half years until she died on January 25, 2001, at the age of 86.

== Bibliography ==
- The Lonely Doll. Doubleday, (1957) - Kirkus Star recipient "will be pet of the nursery"
- Holiday for Edith and the Bears. Doubleday, (1958)
- The Little One. Doubleday, (1959)
- The Doll and the Kitten. Doubleday, (1960)
- De vakantie van Liesbet en de beren. Den Haag, Breughel [1960].
- Date with London. Random House, (1961)
- The Lonely Doll Learns a Lesson. Doubleday, (1961)
- Lona, a Fairy Tale. Random House, (1963)
- Edith and Mr. Bear. Random House, (1964)
- Take Me Home. Random House, (1965)
- A Gift from the Lonely Doll. Random House, (1966)
- Look at a Gull. Random House, (1967) - "Against striking full-page photographs focused on descriptive and dramatic essentials, a gull tells the story of his life. As the simple rhythmic text takes over, the reader sheds his distrust of the method of telling and his assumed identity becomes quite natural....Come fly away with me somewhere between nature study and poetry."
- Edith and Big Bad Bill. Random House, (1968)
- Look at a Colt. Random House, (1969)
- The Kitten's Little Boy. Four Winds Press, (1971)
- Edith and Little Bear Lend a Hand. Random House, (1972) - "Fans of Edith and her ursine companions may find them adorable in beads and fringe and miniature picket signs, but we'd prefer our ecology lessons with more substance and less fancy wrapping."
- Look at a Calf. Random House, (1974)
- Look at a Kitten. Random House, (1975)
- Edith and Midnight. Doubleday, (1978)
- Edith and the Duckling. Doubleday, (1981)

=== Books still in print ===
- The Lonely Doll. Doubleday, (2013) First time issued in paperback.
- Holiday for Edith and the Bears. Dare Wright Media (2013)
- The Doll and the Kitten. Dare Wright Media (2013)
- Lona a Fairy Tale. Dare Wright Media (2013)
- Edith and the Duckling. Dare Wright Media (2013)
- Edith and Midnight. Dare Wright Media (2013)
- Edith and Mr. Bear. Dare Wright Media (2013)
- A Gift from the Lonely Doll. Dare Wright Media (2013) - "Wright's signature b&w photographs evoke a voyeuristic feel."
- The Lonely Doll Learns a Lesson. Dare Wright Media (2013)

=== Posthumously published ===
- Make Me Real. Xlibris. (2007) (self-published)
- Ocracoke in the Fifties. John F. Blair, (2006)
