= Lenci doll =

Type of pressed wool felt doll

Lenci dolls are wool felt dolls that feature heat-pressed wool faces with painted features. They typically have intricately made wool and organdy clothing, adorned with elaborate felt flowers, hats, and/or accoutrements. They are at the top end of the luxury goods market. Today they are considered highly prized collectibles.

The Lenci Company (1918-2001) was established in Turin (Torino) by Enrico di Scavini and Elena (nee König) Scavini after World War I, around 1918. They received a patent for their process for pressing the heads in 1919. The Lenci company produced not only high quality dolls, but luxury goods, toys, puppets, and household wares, including decorative ceramics that were primarily sold in the United States, Europe, and Japan. In the company's heyday, they had over 10,000 items in their product line.

In 1933 The Scavini's took on two partners, giving up two thirds of the company. One third went to Bassoli, the company that made the wool felt cloth for Lenci, and the other third went to brothers Flavio and Pilade Garella, who put up the much needed cash to keep the company afloat after the Great Depression. In 1936 the Scavini's sold their remaining interests in the Lenci Company to the Garella brothers. Elena stayed on as its creative director until her husband Enrico died at the end of 1938.

The name "Lenci" originally comes from the family nickname of Elena di Scavina (who is also known as Helen König di Scavini.)

The "Early Lenci Period" refers to dolls and other products manufactured when Elena was creative director for the Lenci Company. No cost of time or money was spared to achieve the most exquisite design elements of their product lines and brand. Top illustrators and designers, including Marcel Dudovich, were hired to sketch new styles for doll models and home goods.

From 1939-44, under the helm of the Garella's, manufacturing turned to war-related goods made of wool, including gas masks, blankets, and military uniforms. It is unclear if dolls and other luxury goods were made during this time. Around 1943 the Lenci factory was destroyed during a bombing raid. As a result, many of the early head molds were lost.

Under the direction of The Garella Group, Lenci products were streamlined in an effort to be more profitable and in line with the modern progress of the toy trade. There is no exact date of the switch, so one would assume it was a gradual process through the mid 1970s, when there was a distinct change now referred to as the "Later Lenci Period" of manufacture.

While these dolls and products were still finely made, many features that the "Lenci doll" is known for were removed or modernized. A new type of synthetic and wool blend felt was used, as well as synthetic hair and a different process for forming the heads. Flocked plastic, hard plastic, rubber, and celluloid dolls were also introduced.

There were many different product lines that carried the name "Lenci" and "Ars Lenci" that were made by other companies the Garella Group owned.

In 1978 Beppe Garella (son of Pilade) introduced a line of "reproduction" Lenci dolls, using the few head molds that were salvaged from the basement of the factory. These are known as the "Modern Lenci Period". The manufacture of these dolls had transitioned into a cottage-style business model where workers made the various parts and outfits of the dolls from home.

Beppe Garella died in 1992, whereupon the company was taken over by his children. The company was struggling by the year 2000. In 2001, the company's assets, its machinery, and its molds were sold off in bankruptcy proceedings in Italy.

== Description ==
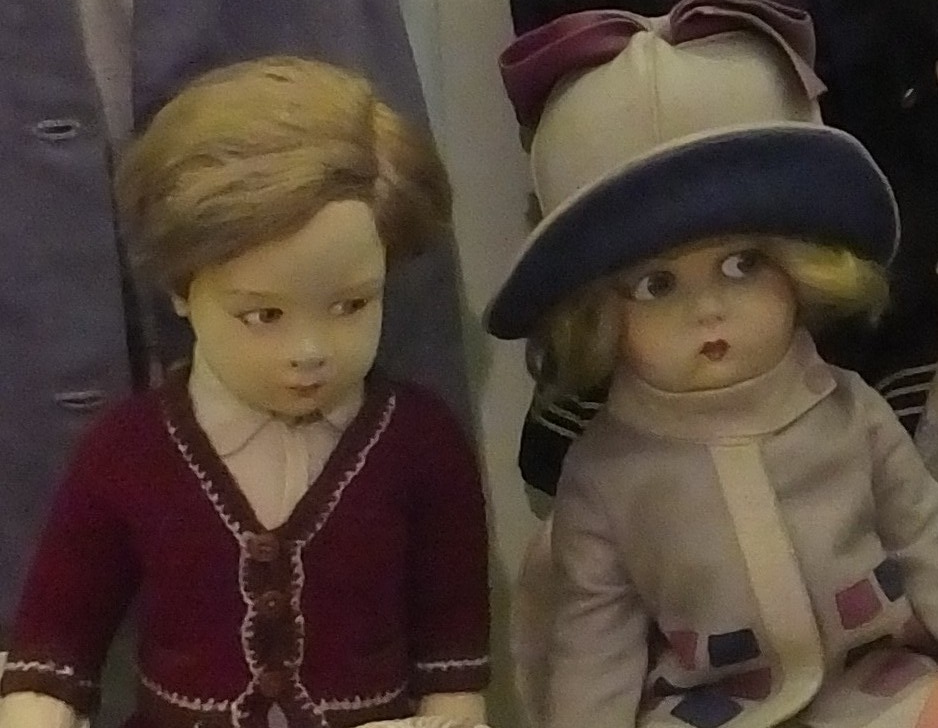
Lenci Boy and girl dolls sitting together at the Judges' Lodgings, Lancaster

The bodies and clothing of Lenci boy and girl dolls are made of pressed woolen felt. The bodies were machine stitched up the back and across the shoulders then hand stitched between the legs. This allowed them to wear low cut tops and clothes that displayed their limbs. The faces were pressed on moulds, and features were then hand-painted. The hair was made from mohair and stitched in. Felt pressed dolls were very popular in the nineteenth century and just after the First World War. The eyes face sideways, giving the boys a sullen expression and the girls one of loneliness. These dolls have Lenci stamped into the felt of the foot. They were produced in various sizes, and sold with various costumes or uniforms. Of the two dolls in the Judges' Lodgings museum in Lancaster, England the boy is in a burgundy cardigan, and the girl is in a blue hat and coat. They were purported to have been made in the memory and image of a deceased daughter.

== History ==
Elena König was born in Turin in 1885. She moved to Germany, where she acquired the pet name of Lenchen which mutated into Lenci when back in Italy. During the chaos of the Great War where Italy fought against Germany, she experimented with felt and its many properties. She married Enrico Scavini in 1915, and he included felt doll manufacture in the Lenci business - one that was primarily concerned with ceramics.

In 1937, the firm employed 300 workers and the family relinquished control.

The factory was bombed during an air-raid in 1944. The company liquidated in 2002.

== In literature ==
Photographer and author Dare Wright wrote a series of children's books, beginning in 1957 with The Lonely Doll, featuring her childhood Lenci doll, "Edith", as the main character.
