= Richard M. Ketchum =

American magazine editor and historian

- Born: March 15, 1922
- Died: January 12, 2012 (aged 89)

Richard Malcolm Ketchum (1922–2012) was an American historian and magazine editor who co-founded the magazine Country Journal.

== Early life ==
Ketchum was born in Pittsburgh, Pennsylvania, on March 15, 1922, to George and Thelma Patton Ketchum. He received his secondary education at Shady Side Academy in Pittsburgh. He went on to graduate from Yale College in 1943 with a degree in American history. During World War II, Ketchum served as commander of a Navy submarine chaser in the Atlantic.

== Career ==
After the war, Ketchum moved to the US state of Vermont. There he obtained various jobs. He owned an advertising agency until 1951 and worked at the U.S. Information Agency and The Orvis Company. After seeing a new opportunity, he left for New York City and was employed at the American Heritage Publishing Company from 1956 until 1974. As an editor, he wrote 33 articles for American Heritage Magazine.

=== Country Journal ===
In 1974, Ketchum returned to Dorset, Vermont and adapted a farming lifestyle. There, he co-founded Country Journal with William S. Blair. The two men shared a commonality in that they both worked in the publishing industry in Manhattan, NYC before moving to the state of Vermont, in which they opted to start a farm.

In 1972, Ketchum and Blair banded together and decided to establish a magazine of their own. Their initial budget was $205,000, composed of $170,000 from their friends and $35,000 from the co-founder's savings. With this funding, they kickstarted the magazine production. Country Journal's coverage ranged from guides to opinion pieces on energy policies.

The magazine was originally dubbed Blair & Ketchum’s Country Journal, but later was shortened to Country Journal. Before its acquisition later on, the editorial office and the business office were located in Manchester, New Hampshire and Brattleboro, Vermont, respectively. The business office was relocated to Harrisburg, Pennsylvania after the transaction.

Initially, Country Journal had difficulties earning a profit. Blair said that he was unable to seek advertisers with high budget in mind and often had to compromise for lower prices. Country Journal struggled to attract authors on the more famous side. Ketchum paid relatively low compensation compared to other magazines at the time, with him giving $200 to $500 per article written.

The magazine was popular, reaching a circulation of under 300,000. By 1972, Country Journal had an editorial team of eight. It received a National Magazine Award in April 1975. In 1984, the magazine company Historical Times Inc. acquired the magazine for an eight-figure sum. In the year that it was sold, it was estimated that the magazine earned a revenue of $3.3 million. According to The New York Times, the magazine "offered a blend of the bucolic and the practical, particularly to city folk who had opted for the rural life."

=== Late life ===
Ketchum spent last 4 years of his life at a retirement home in Shelburne, Vermont. He died in January 12, 2012 at the age of 89.

=== Personal life and legacy ===
Ketchum had a son and a daughter. Historian Douglas Brinkley has said that Ketchum was "the finest historian of the American Revolution."

== Published works ==
Ketchum was the author of numerous publications involving wars in America. The Borrowed Years, 1938–1941 (1989) describes the events leading up to the bombing of Pearl Harbor. His last book, Victory at Yorktown: The Campaign That Won the Revolution is an account of the battle and unlikely triumph that led to American independence.

Saratoga: Turning Point of America's Revolutionary War is about the invasion where British general John Burgoyne led from Canada during the American Revolution War. It was praised by historian Pauline Maier at New York Times, citing its detail.

=== Revolutionary War Books ===
- 1962: Decisive Day: The Battle for Bunker Hill; Ketchum, Richard M. (15 May 1999). 1999 pbk edition. Macmillan. ISBN 0805060995.
- 1973: The Winter Soldiers: The Battles for Trenton and Princeton ISBN 0385054904
- 1974: The World of George Washington ISBN 0828102678
- 1997: Saratoga: Turning Point of America's Revolutionary War
- 2002: Divided Loyalties: How the American Revolution Came to New York
- 2004: Victory at Yorktown: The Campaign That Won the Revolution

=== Other books ===
- 1960: The American Heritage Picture History of The Civil War(editor) LCCN 60--10751
- 1965: The American Heritage Book of Great Historic Places
- 1970: Faces from the Past
- 1970: The Secret Life of the Forest ISBN 0070344183
- 1973: Will Rogers: His Life and Times ISBN 0070344116
- 1989: The Borrowed Years, 1938–1941

=== Selected articles ===
- “The Decisive Day Is Come (Battle of Bunker Hill),” American Heritage, August 1962, Volume 13, Issue 5
- "England’s Vietnam: The American Revolution," American Heritage, June 1971, Volume 22, Issue 4
- "The Spirit Of ’54," American Heritage, August/September 2002, Volume 53, Issue 4
