= Practical Photography =

Magazine published by Bauer Media from 1959 to 2020

- Practical Photography's final issue, published in August 2020
- Editor: Ben Hawkins
- Categories: Photography
- Frequency: Monthly
- Publisher: Bauer Consumer Media
- Founded: 1959
- Final issue: 2 June 2020
- Country: GBR
- Language: English
- Website: practicalphotography.com (redirects to What's The Best?, a subsidiary of Bauer Media)

Practical Photography was a UK monthly photography magazine published by the Bauer Media Group since it was acquired from EMAP in 2008. Established in 1959, It ceased publishing on 2 June 2020 following Bauer Publishing's decision to stop printing many of its magazines due to the economic impact of the COVID-19 pandemic. The magazine included subject guides, camera and editing tutorials, interviews, Q&As and product reviews, as well as how-to videos. It also featured Camera School, an annual camera skills course for beginners. When it ceased publication, the group editor was Ben Hawkins.

Alongside a monthly magazine, Practical Photography could also be found on social media, including the popular Practical Photography Talk Facebook group and its YouTube channel Practical Photography Magazine.

== Staff ==
Staff members for the magazine (as of last publication):

- Group Editor, Ben Hawkins
- Deputy Editor, Chris Parker
- Features Editor, Adam Atkins
- Gear and Technique Editor, Kirk Schwarz
- Senior Art Editor, Chris Robinson
- Videographer, Jake Kindred
- Production Editor, Marie Marsh
- Editorial Assistant, Beth Mackman
