= Laufer Media =

American magazine publisher

Laufer Media is an American magazine publisher, focusing on teen magazines.

== History ==
Tiger Beat was started in 1965 by Charles Laufer, and brought stars such as Donny Osmond to national attention. Laufer started several more teen magazines with the same formula. These magazines were later sold to Sterling's Magazines (later Sterling-Macfadden). Scott Laufer, along with three sisters, then founded Bop. Bop was sold to Primedia in 1998. At the same time, Primedia acquired Sterling-Macfadden's teen magazines. When Primedia wished to exit the teen market in 2003, Scott Laufer Media bought back Tiger Beat and Bop.
