= Jones Publishing =

American publishing and media company

- Founded: March 1, 1986
- Founder: Joe Jones
- Country of origin: United States
- Headquarters location: Iola, Wisconsin
- Publication types: Magazines
- Nonfiction topics: Collectibles
- Official website: jonespublishing.com

Jones Publishing, is a publishing and media company located in Iola, Wisconsin, United States. The company produces a number of publications dealing with collectibles, including Teddy Bear & Friends, which is dedicated to the collection and hobby of teddy bears and soft sculpture collecting; and Dolls. They also publish craft magazines including Doll Crafter & Costuming, Crafts Report, and Fired Arts & Crafts.

On August 31, 2017, JP Media LLC purchased Jones Publishing, Inc. in a planned transfer of the company from Joe and Maggie Jones to Diana Jones, their daughter-in-law.
