= Andy Warhol filmography =

American artist and filmmaker Andy Warhol produced more than 600 films between 1963 and 1968, including short Screen Tests film portraits. His subsequent work with filmmaker Paul Morrissey guided the Warhol-branded films toward more mainstream success in the 1970s. Since 1984, the Whitney Museum of American Art and Museum of Modern Art (MoMA) worked to preserve, restore, exhibit, and distribute Warhol's underground films. In 2014, the MoMA began a project to digitize films previously unseen and to show them to the public.

== Summary ==
Warhol had long been interested in film, and once he achieved success with his pop art paintings, he began producing experimental films at his studio, The Factory, financing his filmmaking with the income from his art. In 1962, Warhol attended the premiere of the static composition by La Monte Young called Trio for Strings and subsequently created his famous series of static films. Filmmaker Jonas Mekas, who accompanied Warhol to the premiere, claimed Warhol's static films were directly inspired by that performance.

In 1963, Warhol experimented with single-frame cinematography, a stylistic method already used by a number of independent filmmakers. However, he quickly came to the conclusion that long takes were the opposite of what was conventional at the time, and he started producing "motionless" films such as Sleep (1964), over 5 hours of a man sleeping, and Empire (1965), an 8-hour view of the Empire State Building captured by a stationary camera. Speaking on his early films, Warhol stated that "people weren't supposed to see them as movies; they were only intended to be projected on the wall of a room so that you could take a look at them when you felt like it."

For his early works, filmmaker Jonas Mekas presented Warhol with the Independent Film Award of 1964, which was "the underground's answer to Oscar." The Village Voice hailed Warhol as one of New York's "most exciting" filmmakers. Mike McGrady of Newsday regarded Warhol as "the Cecil B. DeMille of the Off-Hollywood movie makers." Art critic David Bourdon wrote that "far from literal transcriptions of reality, Warhol's films are more inventive, artificial and art-directed than some of his admires would like to believe."

In 1965, Warhol announced his retirement from painting to focus on filmmaking. During this period, Warhol filmed his Screen Tests, which were taken between 1964 and 1966, featuring candid shots of various people. The subjects are both frequenters and new visitors to the Factory; some anonymous and others well-known. Warhol requested each of them to pose for silent, black-and-white, 100-foot rolls of film to be shot by his stationary 16mm Bolex movie camera.

In 1965, Warhol met Paul Morrissey and they collaborated on several films, including My Hustler (1965), The Velvet Underground and Nico: A Symphony of Sound (1966), Chelsea Girls (1966), and I, a Man (1967). Warhol's films featured his "superstars," who were personalities who were part of his Factory scene, such as Taylor Mead, Edie Sedgwick, Nico, Ingrid Superstar, Ultra Violet, International Velvet, and Viva. Warhol provided funding for his underground films in the 1960s, but because the films were not very profitable the actors received little to no compensation. Instead, he would treat them to meals at Max's Kansas City where he traded art for credit at the restaurant. "We felt fortunate to collaborate with Andy," said Bibbe Hansen. "We lived to serve the work. Just to have access to a theater, a stage or a camera, lights and film that was a gift and allowed us to do our art."

Warhol's films did not have a script, and he would encourage the actors to improvise dialogue. "Mostly I just turn on the camera, I select the people who are going to be in the film and they turn on for the camera. We tried scripts, but the people did just as badly after 40 rehearsals. So now they just do what they want to do," he said in 1968. He elaborated in his memoir POPism: The Warhol '60s (1980): "What I liked was chunks of time all together, every real moment. I only wanted to find great people and let them be themselves and talk about what they usually talked about and I'd film them for a certain length of time and that would be the movie."

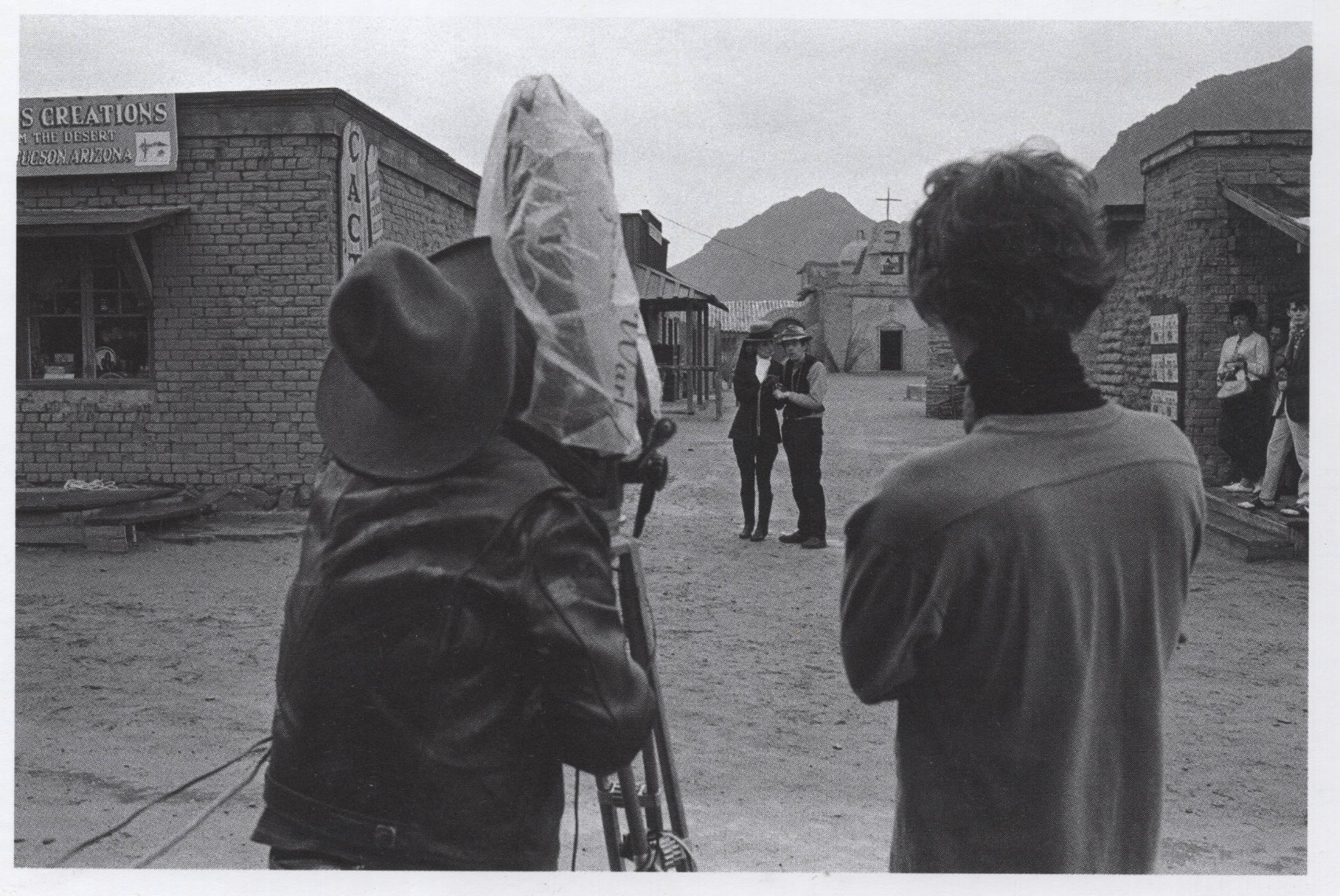
Warhol and Morrissey filming Lonesome Cowboys with Viva and Taylor Mead in Arizona, 1968

In 1967, Warhol and Morrissey began filming outdoors and in color, starting with Imitation of Christ (1967), which was filmed in California. They filmed Lonesome Cowboys (1968) in Arizona and San Diego Surf (1968) in California. As Warhol was recovering from an assassination attempt during the summer of 1968, Morrissey made his directorial debut with Flesh (1968).

Warhol commented on mainstream America through his art while disregarding its conservative social views. A number of his works filmed at the Factory featured nudity, graphic sexual content, drug use, same-sex relations, and transgender characters in much greater proportion than what was being shown in mainstream cinema. Warhol's film Blue Movie (1969), starring Viva and Louis Waldon, was the first adult erotic film depicting explicit sex to receive a wide theatrical release in the United States.

Morrissey joined forces with writer John Hallowell, who arranged for Columbia Pictures to fly Warhol and his entourage to Los Angeles to discuss a potential film contract in February 1969. In May 1969, Variety reported that producer Michael Laughlin was financing a $100,000 Warhol film, including the purchase of the title rights to Hallowell's book The Truth Game. According to Warhol, the film would star Candy Darling and feature cameo appearances by Leslie Caron, Clint Eastwood, Natalie Wood, and Troy Donahue. The project was never realized, and Warhol and Morrissey instead made Trash (1970) and Women in Revolt (1971).

In 1971, Hallowell pitched another project to Warner Bros., pairing his "rock god," John Fogerty, with "the art god" Warhol. The studio again flew Warhol and his entourage to Los Angeles for discussions, but the deal also fell through. Hallowell's story later served as the basis for Heat (1972), which was filmed in Hollywood. During the early 1970s, Warhol and Morrissey also began filming internationally, producing L'Amour (1972) in Paris, followed by Andy Warhol's Frankenstein (1973) and Andy Warhol's Dracula (1974), both filmed in Rome.

Warhol's longtime partner Jed Johnson, who had worked with him and Morrissey on several films, directed his final production, Andy Warhol's Bad (1977). In the event that the film was a commercial success, they had planned to move to California; however, Warhol lost money and stopped producing films.

In 1986, Warhol sought to return to filmmaking by acquiring the rights to Tama Janowitz's bestselling novel Slaves of New York, intending to produce the film adaptation.

== The Andy Warhol Film Project ==
Warhol discontinued the distribution of all of his experimental films in 1970. Years later, film scholar John Hanhardt, general editor of The Films of Andy Warhol Catalogue Raisonné, 1963-1965, Volume 2 (2021), who was Curator and Head of Film and Video at the Whitney Museum of American Art, proposed a collaborative project in which the Whitney and the Museum of Modern Art (MoMA) would collaborate to preserve, restore, exhibit, distribute, and catalogue Warhol's filmography. Warhol's assistance was sought, and in 1984, he placed his original film materials on deposit at the MoMA, while the Whitney began fundamental research for the catalogue raisonné. The Whitney, MoMA, the Andy Warhol Foundation for the Visual Arts, and the Andy Warhol Museum collaborated on this project, which was known as the Andy Warhol Film Project.

== List of selected films ==
Year	Film	Cast	Notes
1963	Andy Warhol Films Jack Smith Filming "Normal Love"	Jack Smith	Lost film
1963	Sarah-Soap	Sarah Dalton	
1963	Denis Deegan	Denis Deegan	
1963	Rollerskate/Dance Movie	Fred Herko	
1963	Jill and Freddy Dancing	Fred Herko, Jill Johnston	
1963	Elvis at Ferus	Irving Blum	
1963	Taylor and Me	Taylor Mead	
1963	Tarzan and Jane Regained... Sort of	Taylor Mead, Dennis Hopper, Naomi Levine	
1963	Duchamp Opening	Irving Blum, Gerard Malanga	
1963	Salome and Delilah	Fred Herko, Deborah Lee	
1963	Haircut No. 1	Billy Name, Fred Herko, John Daley, James Waring	
1963	Haircut No. 2	Billy Name, Fred Herko, Deborah Lee	
1963	Haircut No. 3	Johnny Dodd, Billy Name	
1963	Henry in Bathroom	Henry Geldzahler	
1963	Taylor and John	John Giorno, Taylor Mead	
1963	Bob Indiana, Etc.	John Giorno	
1963	Billy Klüver	John Giorno	
1963	John Washing	John Giorno	
1963	Naomi and John	John Giorno	
1963	Naomi and Rufus Kiss	Naomi Levine, Rufus Collins	
1964	Sleep	John Giorno	Running time of 320+ minutes
1964	Kiss	Naomi Levine, Barbara Rubin, Gerard Malanga, Rufus Collins, Johnny Dodd, Ed Sanders, Mark Lancaster, Fred Herko, Baby Jane Holzer, Robert Indiana, Andrew Meyer, John Palmer, Pierre Restany, Harold Stevenson, Philip van Rensselaer, Charlotte Gilbertson, Marisol, Stephen Holden, Bela Lugosi	
1964	Blow Job	DeVeren Bookwalter, Willard Maas (offscreen)	Shot at 24 frame/s, projected at 16 frame/s
1964	Jill Johnston Dancing	Jill Johnston	
1964	Shoulder	Lucinda Childs	
1964	Eat	Robert Indiana	
1964	Dinner At Daley's		
1964	Soap Opera	Jane Holzer, Rufus Collins, Gerard Malanga. Sam Green, Ivy Nicholson	
1964	Batman Dracula	Gregory Battcock, Rufus Collins, Henry Geldzahler, Jane Holzer, Naomi Levine, Ivy Nicholson, Gerard Malanga, Taylor Mead, Mario Montez	
1964	Three	Walter Dainwood, Gerard Malanga, Ondine	
1964	Jane and Darius	Jane Holzer	
1964	Couch	Gregory Corso, Allen Ginsberg, Gerard Malanga, Naomi Levin, Henry Geldzahler, Taylor Mead	
1964	Empire		Runtime of 8 hours 5 minutes
1964	Henry Geldzahler	Henry Geldzahler	
1964	Taylor Mead's Ass	Taylor Mead	
1964	Six Months		
1964	Mario Banana 1	Mario Montez	
1964	Mario Banana 2	Mario Montez	
1964	Harlot	Gerard Malanga, Mario Montez	
1964	Mario Montez Dances	Mario Montez	
1964	Isabel Wrist	Isabel Eberstadt	
1964	Imu and Son	Imu	
1964	Allen	Gerard Malanga, Taylor Mead	
1964	Philip and Gerard	Phillip Fagan, Gerard Malanga	
1964	Pause		
1964	Messy Lives		
1964	Lips		
1964	Apple		
1964	The End of Dawn		
1964–65	13 Most Beautiful Women		Assembled from Screen Tests
1964–66	13 Most Beautiful Boys		Assembled from Screen Tests
1964–66	50 Fantastics and 50 Personalities		Assembled from Screen Tests
1965	John and Ivy	Ivy Nicholson, John Palmer	
1965	The Life of Juanita Castro	Marie Menken, Mercedes Ospina, Ronald Tavel	
1965	Drink	Gregory Battcock,Emile de Antonio	
1965	Suicide		
1965	Horse	Gregory Battcock, Larry Letreille	
1965	Vinyl	Gerard Malanga, Ondine, Edie Sedgwick	
1965	Bitch	Gerard Malanga, Marie Menken, Edie Sedgwick	
1965	Poor Little Rich Girl	Edie Sedgwick	
1965	Face	Edie Sedgwick	
1965	Restaurant	Bibbe Hansen, Donald Lyons, Ondine, Edie Sedgwick	
1965	Afternoon	Dorothy Dean, Donald Lyons, Ondine, Edie Sedgwick	
1965	Beauty No. 1	Edie Sedgwick	
1965	Beauty No. 2	Gerard Malanga, Gino Piserchio, Edie Sedgwick, Chuck Wein	
1965	Space	Edie Sedgwick	
1965	Factory Diaries	Paul America, Billy Name, Ondine, Edie Sedgwick	
1965	Outer and Inner Space	Edie Sedgwick	
1965	Prison	Bibbe Hansen, Marie Menken, Edie Sedgwick, Pat Hartley, Dorothy Dean	
1965	The Fugs and The Holy Modal Rounders	The Fugs, The Holy Modal Rounders	
1965	Paul Swan	Paul Swan	
1965	My Hustler	Paul America, Ed Hood	
1965	My Hustler II	Paul America, Pat Hartley, Gerard Malanga, Billy Name, Ingrid Superstar	
1965	Camp	Jane Holzer, Gerard Malanga, Mario Montez, Paul Swan	
1965	More Milk, Yvette	Mario Montez	
1965	Lupe	Billy Name, Edie Sedgwick	
1965	The Closet	Nico	
1966	Kitchen	Donald Lyons, René Ricard, Edie Sedgwick, Roger Trudeau	
1966	Ari and Mario	Mario Montez, Nico	
1966	3 Min. Mary Might		
1966	Eating Too Fast	Gregory Battcock	
1966	The Velvet Underground and Nico: A Symphony of Sound	The Velvet Underground, Nico	
1966	The Velvet Underground A.K.A. Moe in Bondage	Moe Tucker, John Cale, Sterling Morrison, Lou Reed	
1966	Hedy	Gerard Malanga, Mario Montez, Ingrid Superstar, Ronald Tavel, Mary Woronov	
1966	Rick	Roderick Clayton	Unreleased
1966	Withering Heights	Charles Aberg, Ingrid Superstar	Unreleased
1966	Paraphernalia	International Velvet	
1966	Whips		
1966	Salvador Dalí	Salvador Dalí, Gerard Malanga	
1966	The Beard	Gerard Malanga, Mary Woronov	
1966	Superboy	International Velvet, Ed Hood, Mary Woronov	
1966	Patrick	Patrick Fleming	
1966	Chelsea Girls	Brigid Polk, International Velvet, Eric Emerson, Gerard Malanga, Mario Montez, Marie Menken, Nico, Ondine, Ingrid Superstar, Mary Woronov	
1966	Bufferin	Gerard Malanga	
1966	Bufferin Commercial	Jane Holzer, Gerard Malanga, Mario Montez	
1966	Susan-Space	International Velvet	
1966	The Velvet Underground Tarot Cards	International Velvet	
1966	Nico/Antoine	International Velvet, Nico	
1966	Marcel Duchamp		
1966	Dentist: Nico	Denis Deegan	
1966	Ivy	Denis Deegan	
1966	Denis	Denis Deegan	
1966	Ivy and Denis I		
1966	Ivy and Denis II		
1966	Tiger Hop		
1966	The Andy Warhol Story	Edie Sedgwick, René Ricard	
1966	Since	Ondine, Ingrid Superstar, International Velvet, Mary Woronov, Richard Rheem, Gerard Malanga, Ronnie Cutrone, Ivy Nicolson	
1966	The Bob Dylan Story	International Velvet, John Cale	
1966	Mrs. Warhol	Richard Rheem, Julia Warhola	
1966	Kiss the Boot	Gerard Malanga, Mary Woronov	
1966	Nancy Fish and Rodney	Nancy Fish	
1966	Courtroom		
1966	Jail		
1966	Alien in Jail		
1966	A Christmas Carol	Ondine	
1966	Four Stars aka ****		Runtime of 25 hours
1967	Imitation of Christ	Tom Baker, Brigid Polk, Pat Close, Andrea Feldman, Taylor Mead, Nico, Ondine	
1967	Ed Hood	Ed Hood	
1967	Donyale Luna	Donyale Luna	
1967	I, a Man	Tom Baker, Ivy Nicholson, Valerie Solanas, Ingrid Superstar, Ultra Violet, Viva	
1967	Loves of Ondine	Ondine, Brigid Polk, Rolando Peña, Viva	
1967	Bike Boy	Viva, Brigid Polk, Ingrid Superstar	
1967	Tub Girls	Viva, Brigid Polk, Taylor Mead	
1967	The Nude Restaurant	Taylor Mead, Allen Midgette, Ingrid Superstar, Viva, Louis Waldon	
1967	Construction-Destruction-Construction	Taylor Mead, Viva	
1967	Sunset	Nico	
1967	Withering Sighs		
1967	Vibrations		
1968	Lonesome Cowboys	Joe Dallessandro, Eric Emerson, Viva, Taylor Mead, Louis Waldon	
1968	San Diego Surf	Joe Dallessandro, Eric Emerson, Taylor Mead, Ingrid Superstar, Viva,	Released in 2012
1968	Flesh	Jackie Curtis, Patti D'Arbanville, Candy Darling, Joe Dallessandro, Geraldine Smith, Geri Miller, Jed Johnson (uncredited)	Directed by Paul Morrissey
1969	Blue Movie	Viva, Louis Waldon	
1970	Trash	Joe Dallessandro, Andrea Feldman, Jane Forth, Geri Miller, Holly Woodlawn	Directed by Paul Morrissey
1971	Women in Revolt	Penny Arcade, Jackie Curtis, Candy Darling, Jane Forth, Holly Woodlawn, Geri Miller (uncredited)	Directed by Paul Morrissey
1971	Water		
1971	Factory Diaries		
1972	Heat	Joe Dallesandro, Pat Ast, Eric Emerson, Andrea Feldman, Sylvia Miles, Lester Persky	Directed by Paul Morrissey
1972	L'Amour	Donna Jordan, Michael Sklar, Jane Forth, and Max Delys, Karl Lagerfeld	Co-directed by Paul Morrissey
1973	Flesh for Frankenstein	Joe Dallesandro, Monique van Vooren, Udo Kier	Directed by Paul Morrissey
1974	Blood for Dracula	Joe Dallesandro, Udo Kier, Vittorio de Sica, Maxime McKendry	Directed by Paul Morrissey
1973	Vivian's Girls	Brigid Polk, Candy Darling	
1973	Phoney	Candy Darling, Maxime de la Falaise, Susan Blond, Brigid Polk, John Richardson	
1975	Nothing Special footage	Brigid Polk, Anjelica Huston, Paloma Picasso	
1975	Fight	Brigid Polk	
1977	Bad	Carroll Baker, Perry King, Susan Tyrrell, Susan Blond	Directed by Jed Johnson

== See also ==
- Screen Tests
- You Are the One
