= Street of Stairs =

1968 novel

- Author: Ronald Tavel
- Language: English
- Genre: Novel
- Publisher: Olympia Press
- Publication date: 1968
- Publication place: United States

Street of Stairs is a 1968 novel by the American dramatist Ronald Tavel. It was published by Olympia Press in a seriously-abridged form—over half of the book was excised—but Tavel later released the original, unabridged version of the book online. It is a pederastic and polyphonic novel that follows the life of Mark, an expatriate in Tangier, Morocco, who falls in love with Hamid, a thief.

== Publication ==
The novel was published by the Olympia Press in 1968. In their publication, Olympia Press excised over half of the book, even though, according to literary critic Richard Kostelanetz, they promised Tavel that they would publish the work in its entirety. Later in life, Tavel released a scan of the unabridged version of Street of Stairs on his personal website.

== Plot ==
While dozens of characters have their own narratives throughout the novel, the story focuses on Mark, an expatriate in Tangier, Morocco, falling in love with Hamid, a thief. In one scene, Mark is talking to a Moroccan who says, "I can niki [نيكي, fuck] twenty whores in one night. And if a pretty little boy passes in the street after that—twenty one", and that he is paid to have sex with older men.

== Reception ==
LGBT studies scholar Michael Perkins wrote that the polyphonic quality of the novel makes the city of Tangier, not Mark, "the protagonist of the novel". Kostelanetz criticized Olympia Press' decision to cut out a substantial amount of the book, and said that Tavel has not received "the respectful attention" that his work ultimately warrants. Ira L. Reiss wrote that the niki scene is illustrative of the dynamics of sexual penetration in the region: That while anal sex is not necessarily condemned, the person who is penetrated (the bottom) is seen as socially inferior.

The novel is pederastic. According to pederasty researcher Parker Rossman, Street of Stairs is one of several novels about male foreigners going to the Barbary Coast—from Tunisia to Morocco—to have sex with young boys, which has a pronounced effect on the characters' "sexual behavior and life-styles". Similarly, LGBT studies scholar James T. Sears called the book one of the "pederastic erotic classics" alongside Leo Skir's Boychick and Jean Cocteau's The White Paper.

After reading the novel, Andy Warhol met with Tavel; they grew close, and Tavel wrote part of the script for Warhol's film, Chelsea Girls.
