= The White Paper (novel) =

1928 novel

- Author: Jean Cocteau
- Original title: Le Livre blanc
- Language: French
- Genre: Novel
- Publication date: 1928
- Publication place: France

The White Paper (French: Le Livre blanc, alternatively The White Book) is a 1928 French novel by Jean Cocteau. It is a pederastic semi-autobiographical novel about Cocteau's life, and centers on an unnamed protagonist developing his sexual identity by having sex with men and watching men have sex with each other. Cocteau never placed his name on the book, but he provided illustrations for some of its editions.

== Background and publication ==
Jean Cocteau, a French novelist, stayed with his pupil Jean Desbordes in the south of France for the latter part of 1927. When staying in Chablis later that year, he probably finished writing White Paper, and Desbordes continued writing his debut novel, J'Adore.

The details of the novel's writing process are unclear, and Cocteau never claimed the novel as his own. He initially did not want it to be released, writing on his 1928 manuscript: "Not to be published. It should only be published after my death or anonymously in a deluxe edition limited to five copies". It was published that year, 1928, in his friend's—Maurice Sachs's—literary press, Editions des Quatre Chemins, for a total printing of 31 copies: 10 for Cocteau, and 21 for the public. In 1930, it was published in a new edition by Éditions du Signe, (Note: Possibly a fictitious publisher.) and received a run of 450 copies; where the first edition had no illustrations, the Éditions du Signe had 17 by Cocteau and colorist M.B. Armington. By 2007, it was published at least 13 times, including two editions translated into English, all of which varied considerably: Some (such as in the first edition) had no illustrations at all, and some had 43 (such as in the 1983 Editions de Messine version, all of which were drawn by Cocteau himself and were largely sexually explicit).

Frédéric Canovas, a scholar of French literature, wrote that Cocteau chose The White Paper as the novel's title because of the term's contemporary usage as an official document that addresses social issues. According to Canovas, gay identity and experiences were seen as social problems by Cocteau's contemporaries.

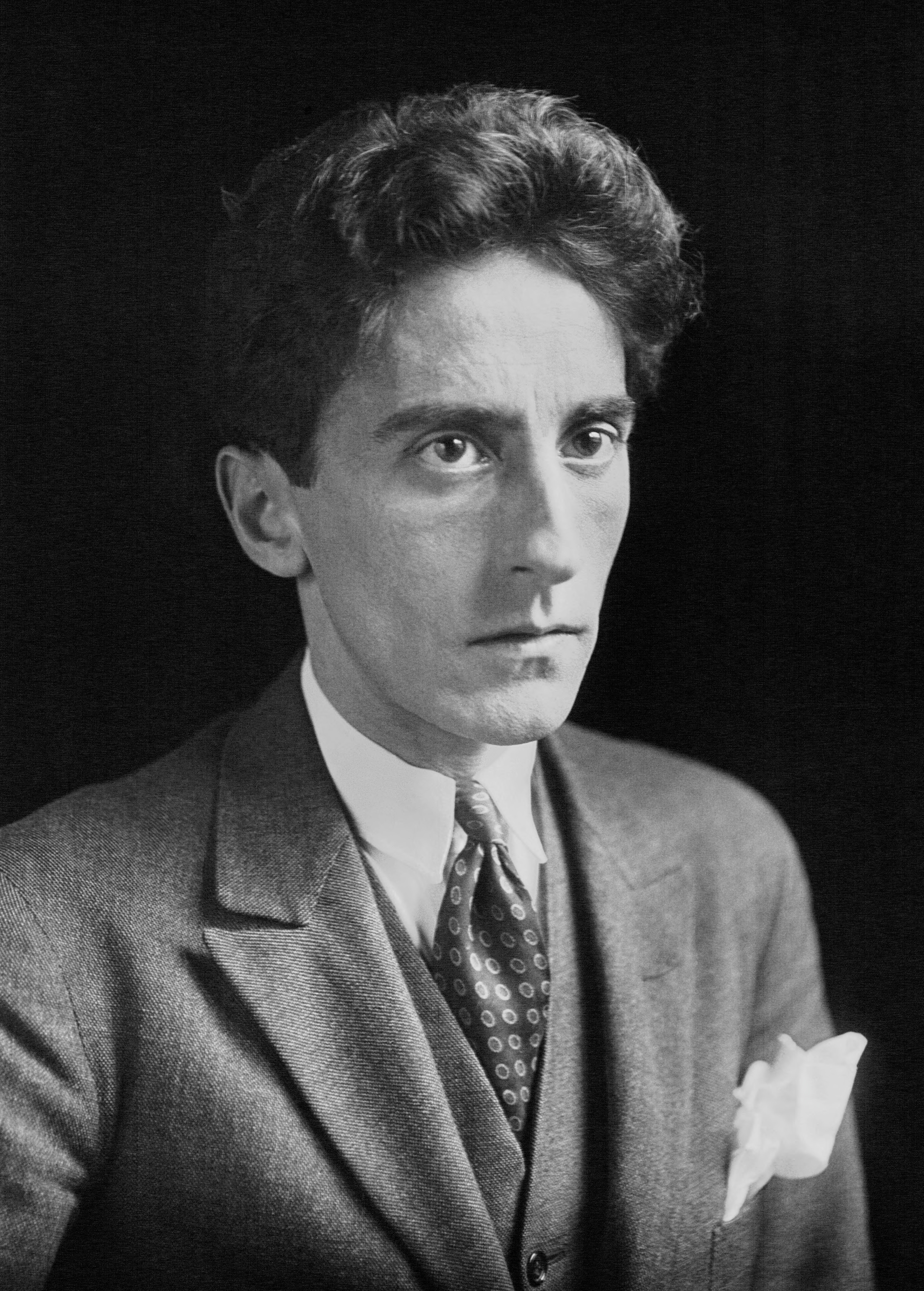
Jean Cocteau in 1923

== Plot ==
The book is a semi-autobiographical account of Cocteau's life. An unnamed narrator grows up and develops his sexual identity. He recounts stories of having crushes in school in Toulon, (Note: A parallel to Cocteau's childhood in Marseille.) one-night stands—including his first sexual encounter in a park near his father's house, and his gay identity being acknowledged after watching two boys have sex—watching nude people masturbate through one-way mirrors, and casual sex at bathhouses. The narrator is never accepted by those around him, and he retreats from society as a whole.

== Reception ==
Frédéric Canovas wrote that Cocteau's choice not to change the novel's text over its several editions, but instead to update the text with illustrations, was a recognition by Cocteau that his ideas about gay identity dramatically changed over his lifetime, and that updating the novel to account for these changes would lead to "too many cuts in the text, too many drastic changes to the plot". Canovas said there was a kind of irony about Cocteau's choice: He never signed the book, meaning he never accepted its history, but also changed its design, meaning he stayed in the process of "acknowledging" it.

Harry Mulford of ONE Magazine, the magazine of gay rights organization ONE, Inc., wrote in 1953 that the book is both confessional and apologetic: It confesses the narrator's gay identity in an "amazingly frank, sharply effective" way, while it also defends the right to develop a gay identity in a "less effective" manner. In contrast, the poet Gregory Woods said Cocteau's attempt at writing erotically failed in the scenes where the narrator watches people through mirrors, saying it was more pornographic, and was a "dishonest erotic mirror".

The book was called one of the "pederastic erotic classics" alongside Leo Skir's Boychick and Ronald Tavel's Street of Stairs, by LGBT studies scholar James T. Sears.

== Notes and references ==
=== Bibliography ===
- Canovas, Frédéric (January 2007). "Jean Cocteau's Le Livre blanc: Sex, text and images". Word & Image. 23 (1): 1–15. doi:10.1080/02666286.2007.10435768. S2CID 192007302.
- Galloway, David; Sabisch, Christian (1982). Calamus: Male homosexuality in twentieth-century literature: An international anthology. William Morrow and Company. ISBN 9780688007973.
- Leach, Nigel (September 1983). "The White Paper by Jean Cocteau". Review. Gay East Midlands. No. 4.
- Mulford, Harry (1953). "The White Paper". Review. ONE Magazine. Vol. 6, no. 8, "for love of a boy".
- Rutledge, Leigh W. (1992) [1987]. The gay book of lists (fourth ed.). Alyson Publications. ISBN 1555831206.
- Sears, James T. (2009) [1998]. "A generational and theoretical analysis of culture and male (homo)sexuality". In Pinar, William (ed.). Queer theory in education. Taylor & Francis. ISBN 978-1410603760.
- Williams, James S. (August 2006). "Resurrecting Cocteau: Gay (in)visibility and the clean-up of French culture". Modern & Contemporary France. 14 (3): 317–330. doi:10.1080/09639480600818441. S2CID 144476755.
- Williams, James S. (2008). Jean Cocteau. Critical Lives. Cromwell Press. ISBN 9781861893543.
- Woods, Gregory (1987). Articulate flesh: Male homo-eroticism and modern poetry. Yale University Press. ISBN 9780300038729.
