= Boychick =

Boychick may refer to:

- Boychik, an English word of Yiddish origin
- Boychiks in the Hood, a 1995 memoir by Robert Eisenberg
- Boychick, a film by Glenn Gaylord
- Boychick (novel), a 1971 novel by Leo Skir
