= Flóra Borsi =

Hungarian photographer (born 1993)

- Born: 1993 (age 32–33); Budapest, Hungary
- Known for: Photographic self-portraits

Flóra Borsi (born 1993, Budapest, Hungary) is a Hungarian fine art photographer known for her surreal self-portraits and innovative photo manipulation techniques. Her work on involves themes of identity, emotions, and the human psyche, often featuring the female form and interplay between concealment and revelation.

== Early life and education ==
Flóra Borsi developed an interest in photography at age 11, teaching herself photo editing with Photoshop. She later pursued formal education in photography at the Moholy-Nagy University of Art and Design in Budapest.

== Artistic style and themes ==
Borsi's work is characterized by photo manipulation, creating surreal images that evoke emotions such as desire, despair, and loss. She uses her own body as the subject, exploring identity and the complexities of the human experience. Her art combines elements of fantasy and reality, utilizing visual storytelling to convey metaphors.

== Exhibitions and recognition ==
Borsi has exhibited her work internationally, including solo exhibitions at the Museum of New Art (MONA) in Detroit, the National Museum of Hungary in Budapest. Her "Time Travel" series garnered attention, where she inserts herself into a series of well-known black-and-white photographs from past eras photographing the subjects with a mobile phone. She has also participated in group exhibitions at the Saatchi Gallery in London and the Louvre. In 2021, Borsi was named amongst the first Hasselblad Heroines of the Year, recognizing her contributions to the field of photography.

She has been featured on BBC Culture and in The Guardian.
