= The Sun (American band) =

American rock band

- Origin: Columbus, Ohio
- Genres: Indie rock Garage rock
- Years active: 1999–2008
- Labels: Warner Bros.
- Members: Chris Burney; Sam Brown; Bryan Arendt; Bradford Forsblom; Bradleah Culkins
- Website: www.virb.com/thesun

The Sun is a band with styles described as pop rock, indie rock and alternative indie rock.

== History ==
The Sun released their first full-length album Blame It on the Youth June 7, 2005 on DVD. Every song has a music video. The disc also has WAV files on it for listening without viewing the videos. While it claims to be the first DVD album, it is not a new idea. There were a few albums in the 1980s that had a video cassette release in the same vein.

The band gained Internet exposure through their music video for the song "Romantic Death", which featured footage (from Beautiful Agony) of people's faces during orgasm.

== Band members ==
- Chris Burney (vocals, guitar)
- Sam Brown (drums)
- Bryan Arendt (guitar)
- Brad Forsblom (bass, backing vocals)
- Brad Caulkins (keyboard, guitar, backing vocals)
