= Boychick (novel) =

1971 novel by Leo Skir

- Author: Leo Skir
- Language: English
- Subject: Pederasty, LGBT culture in New York City
- Genre: Gay literature
- Publication date: 1971
- Publication place: United States
- Pages: 156
- ISBN: 9780878060108

Boychick is a novel by American writer Leo Skir, published in 1971 by Winter House. The book is pederastic and centers on 28-year-old Leo Tsalis falling in love with Leroy, a 16-year-old boy he calls Boychick, after a brief sexual encounter.

Probably written prior to the Stonewall riots of 1969, journalist and activist Dick Leitsch understands the book as Skir's first credited novel. (Note: Award Books published Leo the Last in 1970, a novel by Skir "based on the spectacular film [Leo the Last] starring Marcello Mastroianni". Skir 1970, cover, copyright page) Skir, a gay Jewish-American writer and journalist, previously published at least one novel under a pseudonym and contributed to Jewish and lesbian journals about his identity.

Boychick has received little scholarly attention, and it was met with a mixed critical reception in the gay press. The novel's plot was both criticized as cliché and praised as an authentic expression of gay life in New York City by reviewers.

== Background ==
The book was written by Leo Skir, probably prior to the Stonewall riots of 1969, and published by Winter House. According to gay rights activist and journalist Dick Leitsch, it was Skir's first credited novel, though he wrote others pseudonymously, including Hours (1969) under the pen name Lon Albert. Skir was a Jewish-American and gay writer who published articles in the Sh'ma Journal and the lesbian journal The Ladder about his Jewish and gay identities. Jewish historian Noam Sienna writes that a 1972 narrative by Skir was perhaps the first openly gay Jewish work to be published in an American Jewish publication.

While writing the novel, Skir published a portion of it—entitled "Other Chanukahs"—in the March 1965 edition of Commentary and a 1968 anthology. The first edition of Boychick contained 156 pages and sold for $5.95. The front cover features a photograph by Karen Tweedy-Holmes, and the book's design was completed by Neal Slavin. A paperback edition was published by Belmont/Tower in 1972 under a "special arrangement with Winter House" for $1.25. The novel had a minute readership because of its small-press printing.

== Plot ==
Leo Tsalis is a 28-year-old Jewish-American graduate student studying Old English at New York University. In the showers of Hotel St. George's pool in New York City, he meets a naked 16-year-old boy named Leroy—though he looks "about fourteen or fifteen"—and the two leave together. They take the subway to Leo's friend's house in order to have a brief sexual encounter; instead, his friend's roommate asks them to leave. After walking together for a short while, Leo leaves his address with Leroy, whom he calls Boychick, but does not gather any of his contact information. After Boychick leaves, Leo tells his friends of their encounter and discusses his apprehensions because Boychick is under the age of consent in New York; one friend tells him to ignore his fears and another to "make it platonic", though Leo rejects the idea. Boychick arrives at Leo's house the next day, and they attempt to have sex; Leo cannot maintain an erection, so he instead offers to give a handjob to the boy. Boychick claims he is almost late for work, so they walk to the subway station together and Leo gives him money for the fare.

Leo decides he is in love and goes out to search for him, scouring every place that Boychick mentioned. As he looks, he becomes more infatuated with the boy and imagines the two of them together and holding conversation. Eventually, Boychick calls Leo to say they will meet again soon. Although he promised to show up on a specific day, he does not; later he calls Leo to say he is bringing an older man to Leo's home, where Boychick and the older man have sex. After the older man leaves, Leo walks with Boychick to the subway. They ride in the same car together and make conversation; Boychick is cold to him and, fearing his uncle's retaliation—he does not want his uncle to know that he is gay—asks Leo to leave him alone. Leo obliges, and once he returns home, he cries. In the Belmont/Tower edition, after crying, he visits his parents' house before departing to a writers' colony.

== Reception ==
The book has received little scholarly attention. Skir was involved in the Beat Generation, and many of the novel's characters were based on others in the movement, including Elise Cowen, Allen Ginsberg and his partner Peter Orlovsky, and Janine Pommy Vega. The book was called one of the "pederastic erotic classics", alongside Jean Cocteau's The White Paper and Ronald Tavel's Street of Stairs, by LGBT studies scholar James T. Sears.

In the gay San Francisco magazine Vector, literary critic Frank Howell called the book a "depressing little tome" and criticized the subject matter. The "'sicky' book", as he called it, expressed genuine artistic vision by Skir—Howell said the characters and settings were well-crafted—but the cliché plot of a man failing to find love was ultimately pointless, and he questioned why the book was written at all. He also criticized the plot, which he identified as sometimes moving without connection to the underlying story, and the underdeveloped characters. In contrast, Dick Leitsch, writing in the magazine Gay, said the novel's theme of loss of innocence was presented well and contrasted its modern-day, realistic expression of gay life to the "fantasy worlds" in the works of Erich Segal, D. H. Lawrence, and Wilhelm Reich. He praised the tenderness and authenticity of its writing. Canadian writer Ian Young similarly said the prose was realistic and that it offered a "more humorous view" than traditional forms of gay literature. Writing for The Village Voice, Faubion Bowers commended the book for its artistic vision and described Skir as "a Gide at his best".

Upon its release, the Oscar Wilde Bookshop declined to stock Boychick, saying that part of its title—"chick"—was a sexist word used to unfavorably describe women.
