= Pederasty =

Male adult–male adolescent sexual behavior

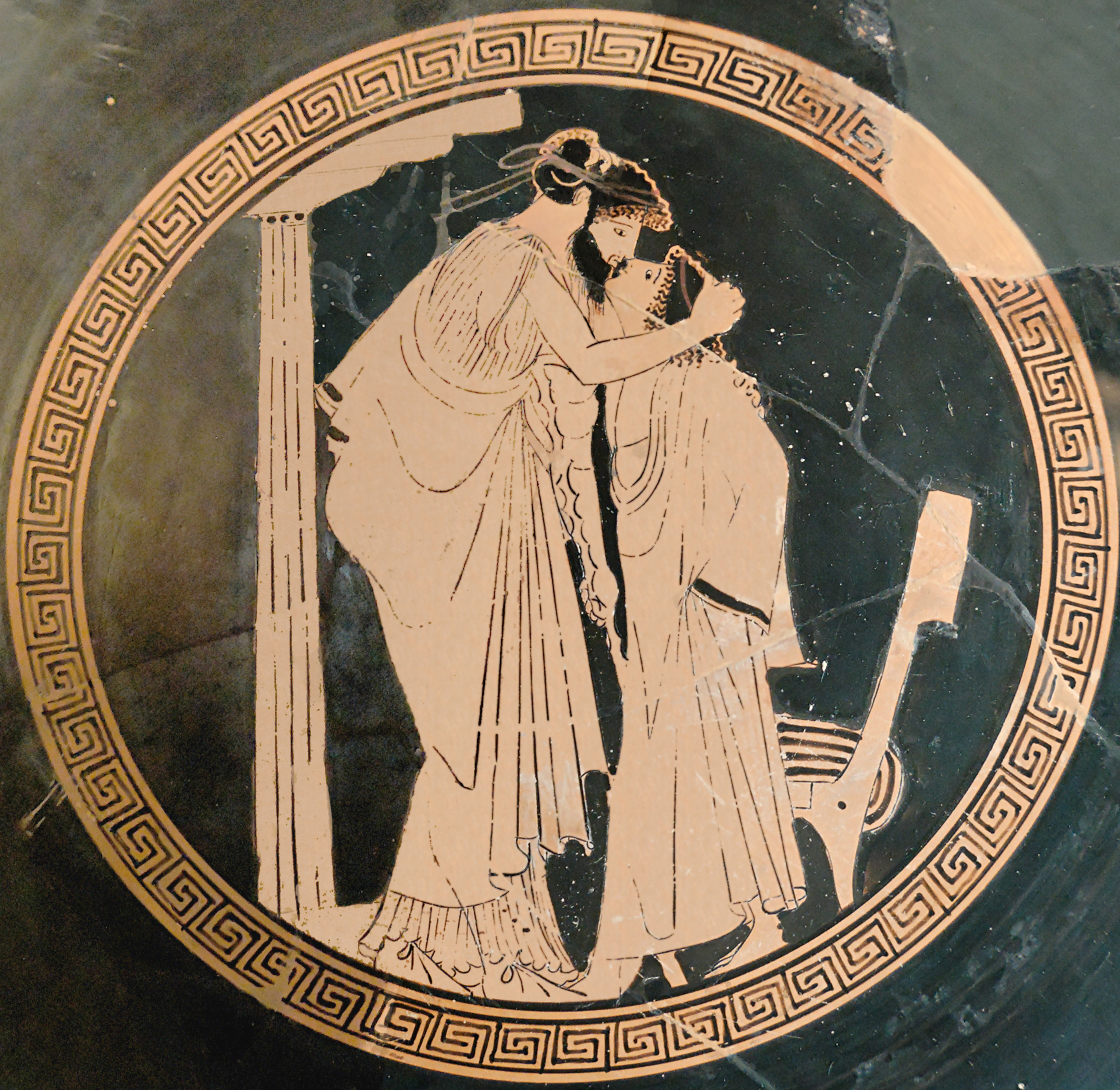
Pederastic kissing on an Attic kylix (5th century BC)

Pederasty (or paederasty) (/ˈpɛdəræsti/) refers to same-sex sexual relationships between an adult male and an adolescent boy; some authors also use the term to refer to same-sex female relationships with a similar age gap. Pederasty existed as a socially acknowledged and accepted practice in some premodern societies.

In most countries today, the local age of consent determines whether a person is considered legally competent to consent to sexual acts, and whether such contact is child sexual abuse or statutory rape. An adult engaging in sexual activity with a minor is considered abusive by authorities for a variety of reasons, including the age of the minor and the psychological and physical harm they may endure.

== Etymology ==
Pederasty derives from the combination of Ancient Greek: παίδ-, romanized: paid-, lit. 'boy, child (stem)' with ἐραστής, erastēs, 'lover' (cf. eros). Late Latin pæderasta was borrowed in the 16th century directly from Plato's classical Greek in The Symposium. (Latin transliterates αί as æ.) The word first appeared in the English language during the Renaissance, as pæderastie (e.g. in Samuel Purchas' Pilgrimes), in the sense of sexual relations between men and boys.

== History ==
=== Ancient Greece ===
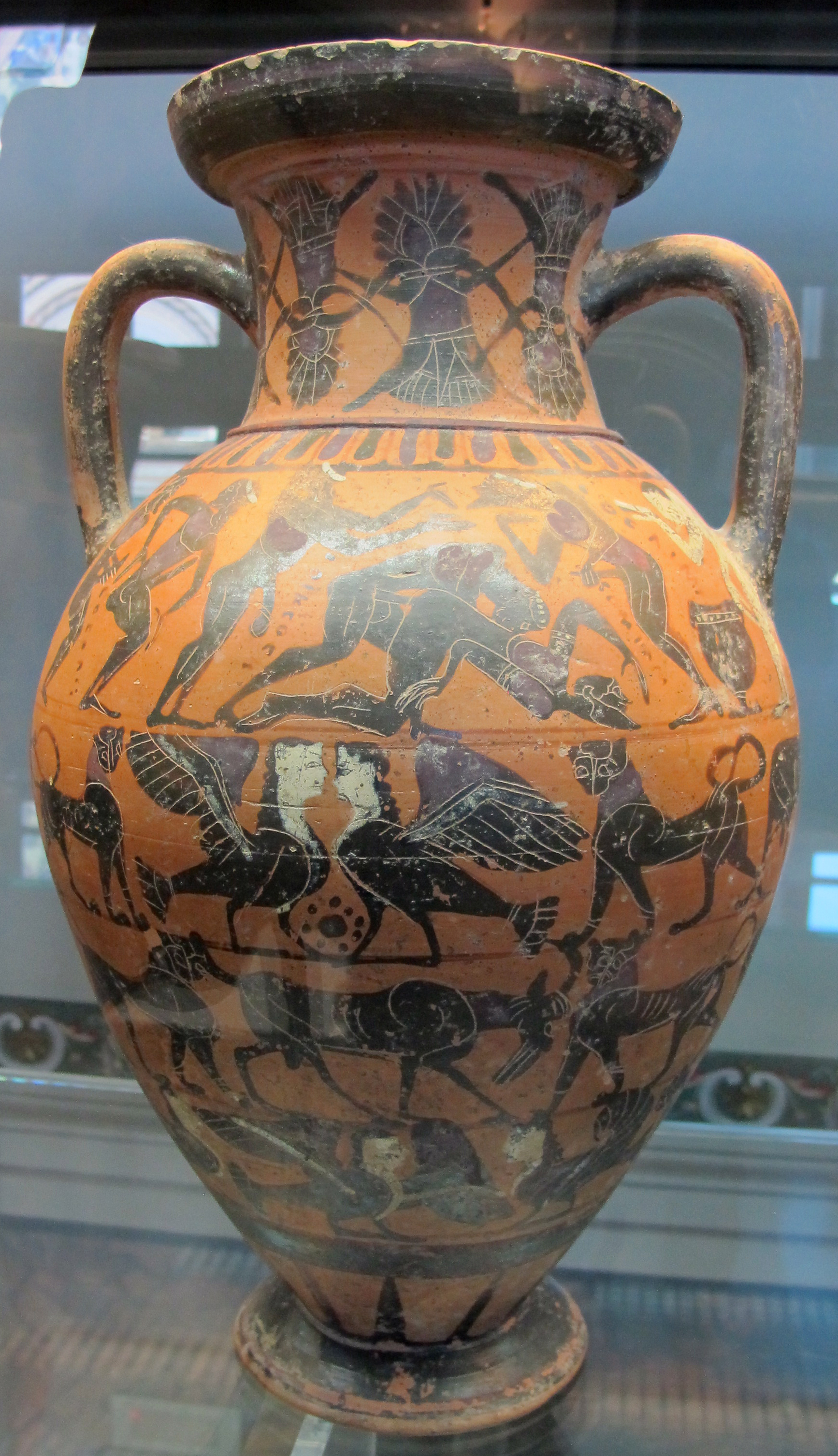
An Ancient Greek vase depicting sexual intercourse between men

Pederasty in ancient Greece was a socially acknowledged romantic relationship between an adult male (the erastes) and a younger male (the eromenos), usually in his teens. This age difference between a socially powerful and socially less-powerful partner was characteristic of the Archaic and Classical periods, in both heterosexual and homosexual relationships. The influence of pederasty on Greek culture of these periods was so pervasive that it has been called "the principal cultural model for free relationships between citizens". The practice was viewed with concerns and disapproval by certain social groups.

In the writings of Xenophon, Socrates says, "A man who sells his favours for a price to anyone who wants them is called a catamite; but if anyone forms a love-attachment with someone whom he knows to be truly good, we regard him as perfectly respectable." According to Kenneth Dover and Michel Foucault, both Xenophon's Socrates and Plato's Socrates opposed pederastic intercourse and instead advocated for chaste pederastic relationships. The two authors' Socratic writings formed one of the main texts that led to their understanding of pederasty as a matter of debate in Ancient Greece.

Some scholars locate its origin in initiation ritual, particularly rites of passage on Crete and in Sparta, where it was associated with entrance into military life and the religion of Zeus. It has no formal existence in the Homeric epics, and seems to have developed in the late 7th century BC as an aspect of Greek homosocial culture, which was characterized also by athletic and artistic nudity, delayed marriage for aristocrats, symposia, and the social seclusion of women. Pederasty was both idealized and criticized in ancient literature and philosophy. The argument has recently been made that idealization was universal in the Archaic period; criticism began in Athens as part of the general Classical Athenian reassessment of Archaic culture.

Scholars have debated the role or extent of pederasty, which is likely to have varied according to local custom and individual inclination. Athenian law, for instance, recognized both consent and age as factors in regulating sexual behavior.

Enid Bloch argues that many Greek boys in these relationships may have been traumatized by knowing that they were violating social customs, since the "most shameful thing that could happen to any Greek male was penetration by another male." She further argues that vases showing "a boy standing perfectly still as a man reaches out for his genitals" indicate the boy may have been "psychologically immobilized, unable to move or run away". One vase shows a young man or boy running away from Eros, the Greek god of desire.

=== Ancient Rome ===
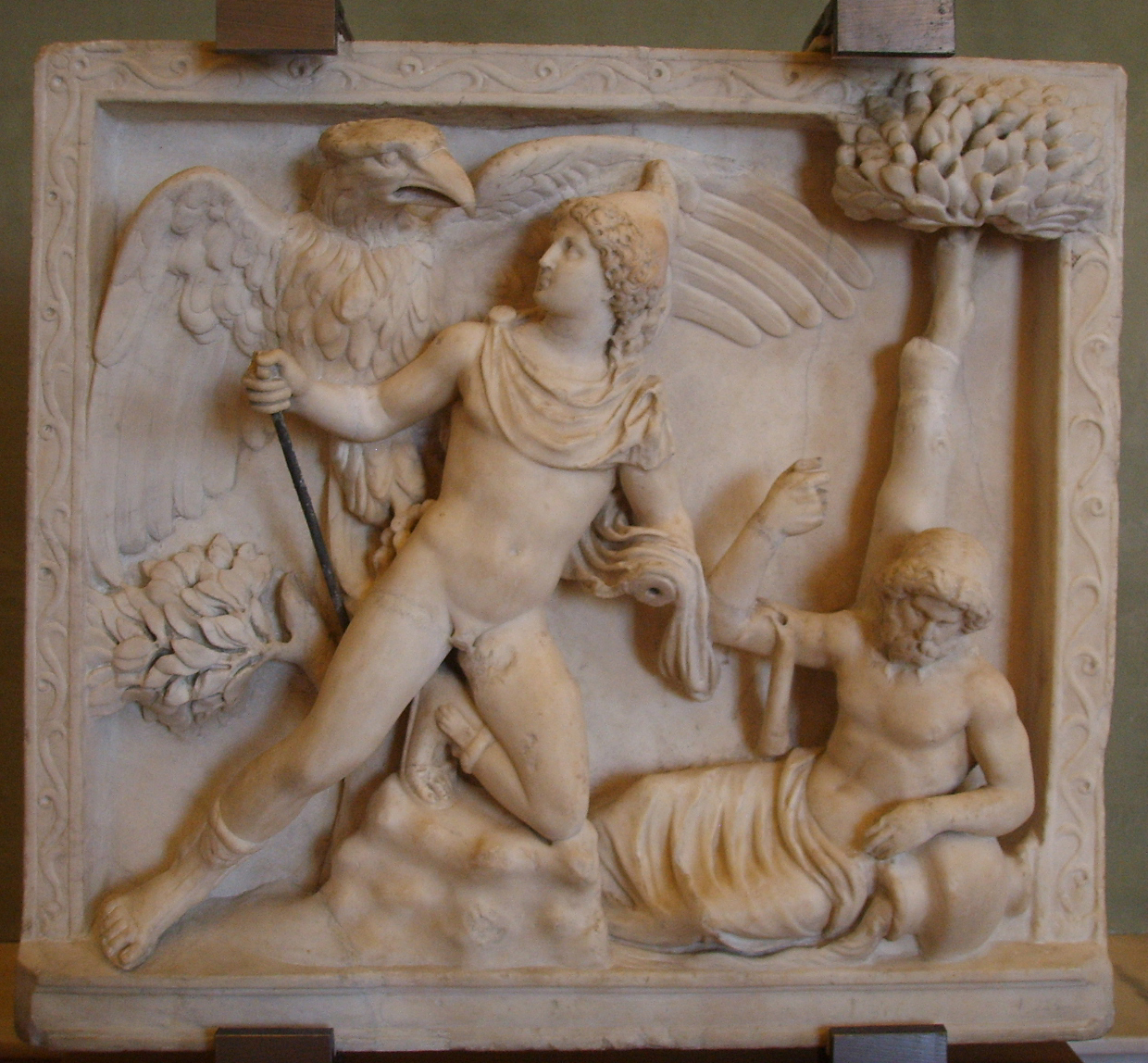
Zeus (or Jupiter) in the form of an eagle abducting Ganymede; 1st-century AD Roman bas-relief

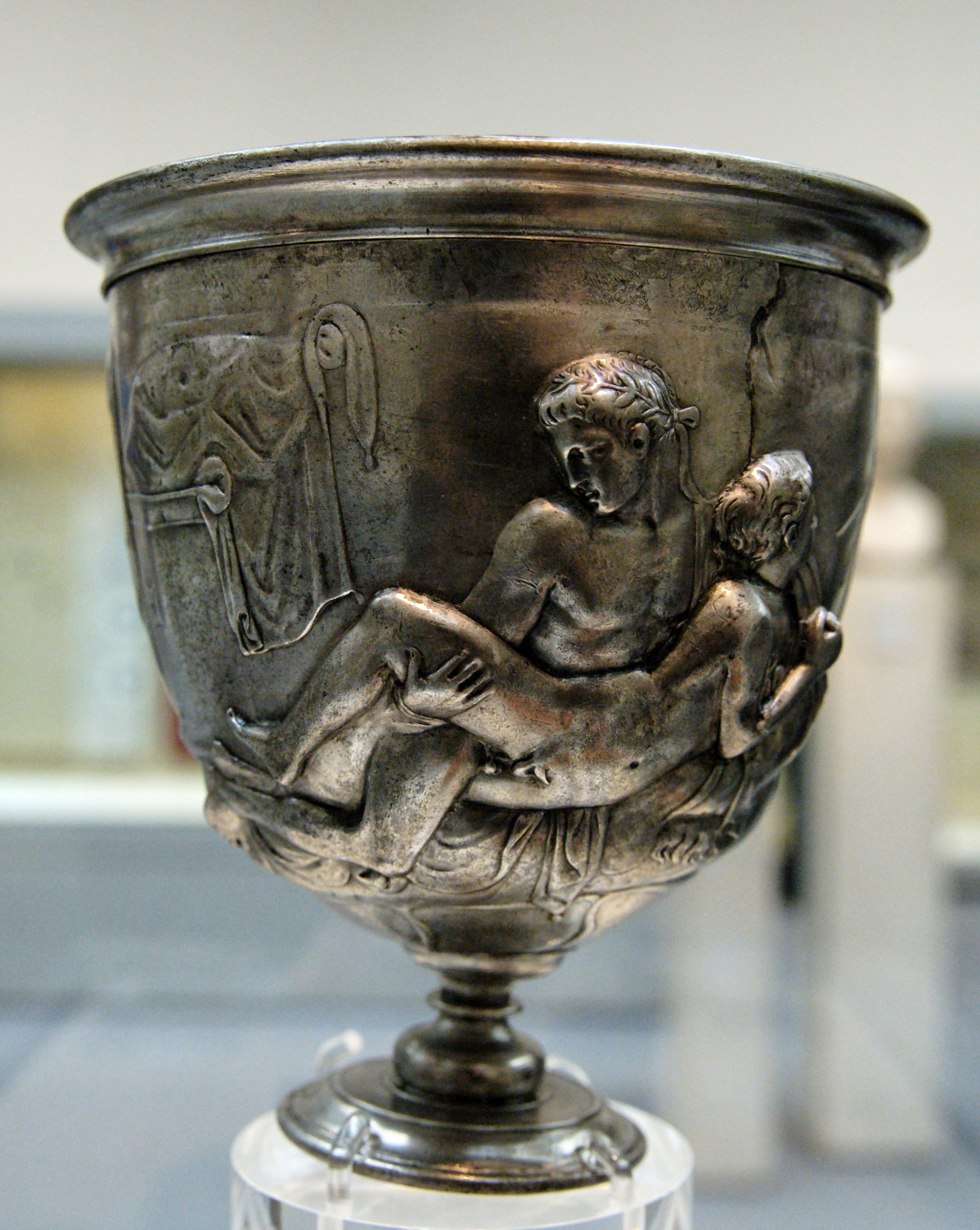
The Warren Cup, now in the British Museum, depicts pederasty

In Latin, mos Graeciae or mos Graecorum ("Greek custom" or "the way of the Greeks") refers to a variety of behaviors the ancient Romans regarded as Greek, including but not confined to sexual practice. Ancient Roman society only tolerated same-sex intercourse within an inherently unequal relationship; male Roman citizens retained their masculinity as long as they took the active, penetrating role, and the appropriate male sexual partner was a prostitute or slave, who would nearly always be non-Roman. Adolescent male partners were known as catamites. In Archaic and classical Greece, paiderasteia had been a formal social relationship between freeborn males; taken out of context and refashioned as the luxury product of a conquered people, pederasty came to express roles based on domination and exploitation. Masters often gave enslaved males, and prostitutes sometimes assumed, Greek names regardless of their ethnic origin; the boys (pueri) Martial loved had Greek names. The use of slaves defined Roman pederasty; sexual practices were "somehow 'Greek'" when they were directed at "freeborn boys openly courted in accordance with the Hellenic tradition of pederasty".

Effeminacy or a lack of discipline in managing one's sexual attraction to another male threatened a man's "Roman-ness" and thus might receive disparagement as "Eastern" or "Greek". Fears that Greek models might "corrupt" traditional Roman social codes (the mos maiorum) seem to have prompted a vaguely documented law (Lex Scantinia) that attempted to regulate aspects of homosexual relationships between freeborn males and to protect Roman youth from older men emulating Greek customs of pederasty.

Theologian Edith Humphrey commented that "the Graeco-Roman 'ideal' regarding homosexuality entailed erotic love, not of children, but of young (teenage) males of the same age that a young woman would be given in marriage, and that frequently the more mature male was only slightly older than the partner."

=== Medieval and Renaissance Europe ===
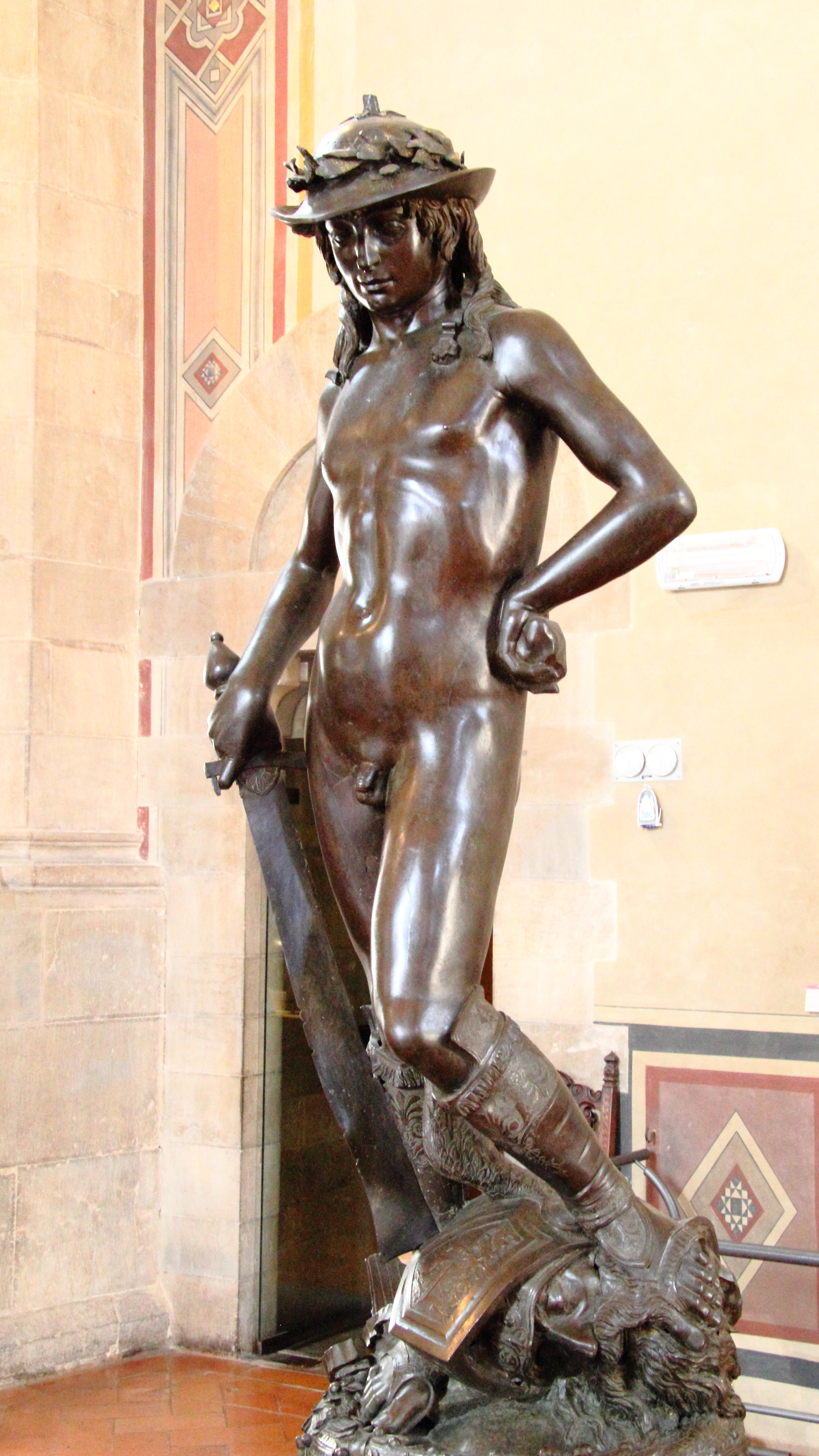
David, a sculpture by Donatello considered to have homoerotic overtones

The Roman Emperor Justinian I, upon converting to Christianity, banned all forms of homosexual intercourse within the Roman Empire, regardless of age. The shift in these cultural attitudes transpired into literature; Eratosthenes Scholastikos, a 6th century Greek author writing shortly after the empire's Christianization, wrote "Let males be for others; I can love only women, whose love lasts a long time. There is no beauty in pubescent youths: I loathe that hateful hair that begins to grow too soon." in an epigram numbered 277 in the Greek Anthology. Nevertheless, various covert forms of pederasty persisted in Europe following his edict.

In 1323, a court sentenced a French subdeacon named Arnold of Verniolle to lifetime incarceration with a diet of bread and water. Historical records document over 3,000 convictions for sodomy in Florence from 1432 to 1502; almost all of these relationships involved pederasty. Hilarius, a Latin language poet of English origin studying in France in the early 12th century, authored several poems discussing homoerotic admiration of adolescent boys. Numerous works of medieval Jewish poetry, the majority authored in al-Andalus during the Golden Age of Jewish culture in Spain, detail similar themes of admiring the beauty of adolescent males.

=== Africa ===
Among the Zande people of Congo, there was a social institution similar to pederasty in Ancient Greece. E. E. Evans-Pritchard also recorded that male Azande warriors routinely took on boy-wives between the ages of twelve and twenty, who helped with household tasks and participated in intercrural sex with their older husbands. The practice had died out by the early 20th century, after Europeans had gained control of African countries, but was recounted to Evans-Pritchard by the elders with whom he spoke.

The Nyakyusa people of Tanzania have traditionally approved of pederastic relationships between an adult man and a boy, along with homosexual relationships between two boys. However, precolonial Nyakyusa culture prohibited rape and consensual homosexual relationships between two adult men, punishing offenders with fines.

Men who worked in some gold mines in South Africa would form sexual relationships with younger males, despite same-sex relationships being illegal under the apartheid regime. Boys in mines performed household chores and served as men's "wives" or sexual partners for extended periods of time.

=== Central Asia ===
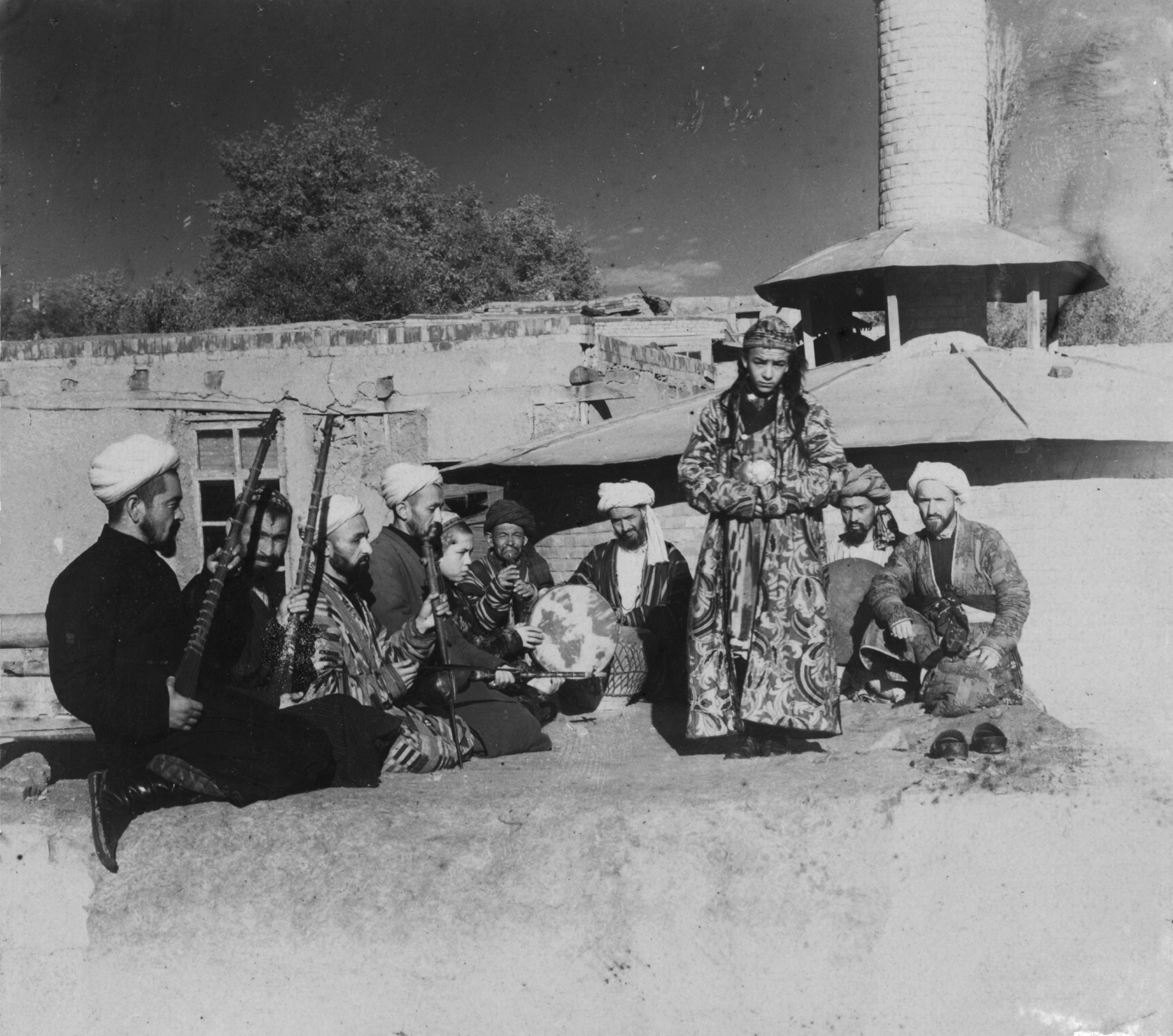
A Bacha dance performance in the city of Samarkand (in modern-day Uzbekistan), c. 1910

Bacha bāzī (Persian: بچه بازی, lit. 'boy play') refers to a practice in which men (sometimes called bacha baz) buy and keep adolescent boys (sometimes called dancing boys) for entertainment and sex in Afghanistan and historical Turkestan.

The most comprehensive study of young male dancers in Afghanistan in the second half of the twentieth century perhaps belongs to German folklorist Ingeborg Baldauf, who studied bacabozlik (bachah-bāzi) among Uzbeks in the north. Baldauf's study, published in 1988 in German under the title Die Knabenliebe in Mittelasien: Bacabozlik (Boy Love in Central Asia: Bachah-bāzī), contended that a significant percentage of the Uzbek male population in Afghanistan's northern provinces were involved in bachah-bāzī at some point in their lives—either as a dancing-bachah or a bachah-lover (or perhaps both in the course of their lives). Bachahs were expected to be familiar with Chagatai literature, have a good grasp of music, know how to sing and dance, have good manners, and accompany their lovers in homosocial occasions. In return, their lovers, or bachah-bāz, had to generously spend money to outdo their rivals, otherwise the bachah would leave for a wealthier man. While the exchange of a few kisses and caresses was permissible between the bachah and bachah-bāz, no sexual intercourse was allowed, or the relationship would end abruptly. According to Baldauf, some men even ruined their families and went bankrupt after spending lavishly on bachahs for years.

Similarly, Gunnar Jarring, a Swedish diplomat and ethnographer who studied the Turkish dialects of Andkhoy in the mid-1930s, heard from an Andkhoy resident about a “current custom” among Afghan Turkmens and Uzbeks in the northern provinces who would keep boys in a cellar for a few years to teach them to dance. “If young boys are to be found,” writes Jarring, “[the people of Afghan Turkistan] never let women dance.

=== East Asia ===
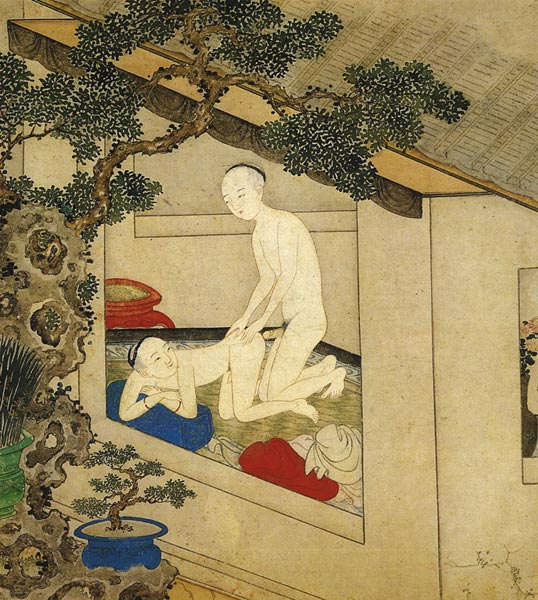
A 19th century Chinese depiction of a scholar engaging in anal intercourse with a boy actor

Classical novels such as The Carnal Prayer Mat discuss relationships between adult men and young boys and scholars often engaged in pederastic relationships with boy actors performing in Peking opera. Qing dynasty laws banned all extramarital sex (same-sex marriages did not exist), which included pederasty, but these laws rarely resulted in prosecution. Novels such as Pleasant Spring and Fragrant Character, often accompanied by illustrations, continued to openly depict pederastic themes. Pederasty, along with other forms of homosexuality, declined during the Republican era from Westernization efforts and the Cultural Revolution further suppressed remnants of feudalism. The Communist Party relegalized same-sex intercourse in 1997 with an age of consent of 14.

Pederasty in Japan prior to the Meiji Restoration existed in similar forms across different societal contexts. Accounts of Buddhist monasteries, samurai circles, and kabuki theatres all commonly noted the presence of relationships between adolescent or pre-pubescent boys (sometimes classified as wakashū) and older male mentor figures. Art and literature of these relationships was common, with perhaps the most well-known collection being ukiyo-zōshi poet Ihara Saikaku's The Great Mirror of Male Love.

=== Early modern Europe ===
==== Pederasty among classical scholars ====
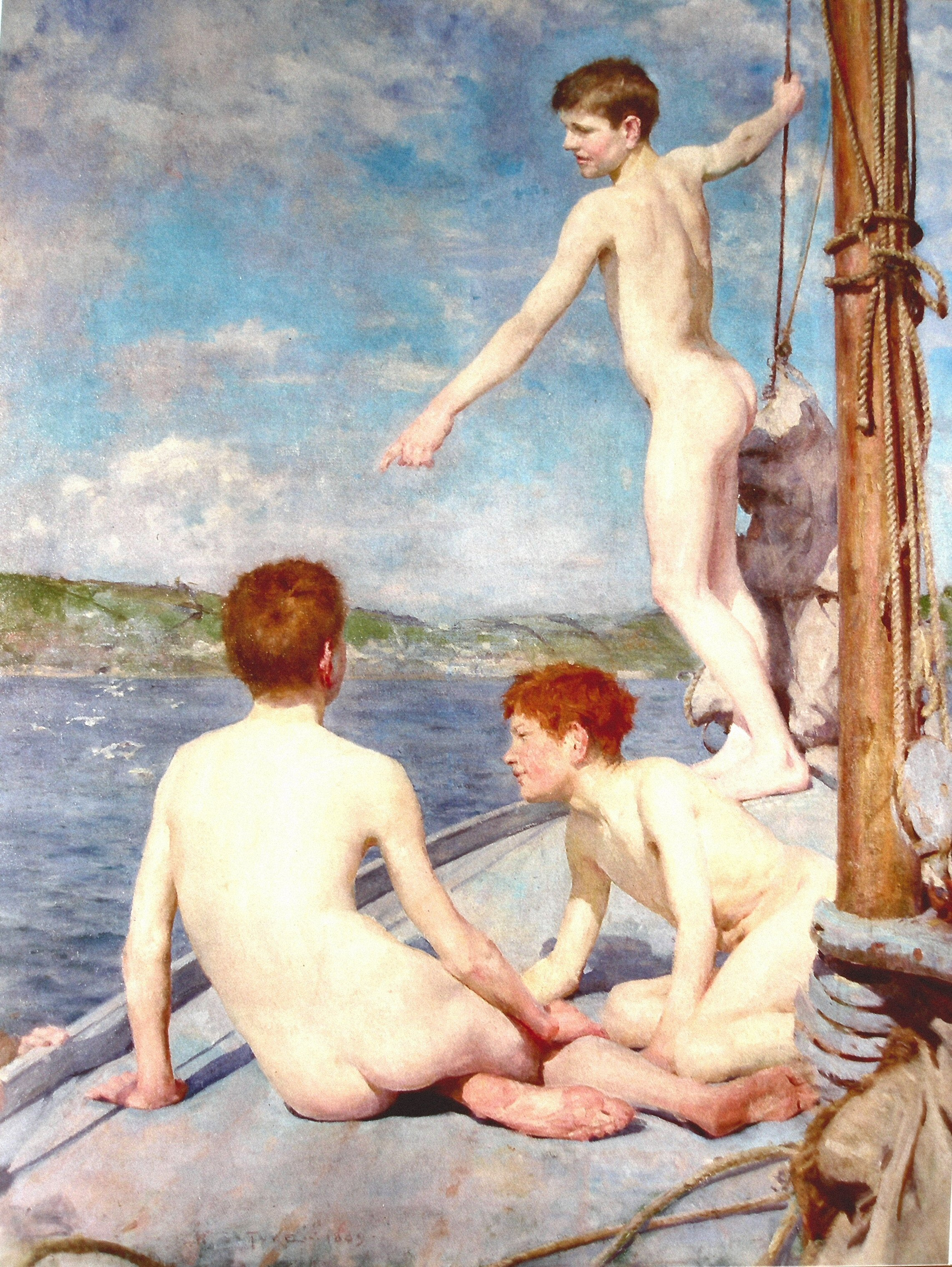
The Bathers by Henry Scott Tuke, an artist associated with the Uranian movement

Classical studies during the 19th century rapidly changed with the exploration of what ancient Greece had to offer, quickly garnering admiration by those in study and capturing the attention of period writers. Holding esteem of the Greeks, 19th-century Europeans began to model and apply Greek concepts and more onto their modern life. This application of Greek philosophy manifested with the Victorians' examination of Plato and the Greek concept of pederasty, which led to them evaluating and applying this conception of intimate Greek encounters to those found within the Victorian era. This fascination and admiration led to works of literature which commemorated pederasty and same-sex love, such as John Addington Symonds's essay "A Problem in Greek Ethics" and Oscar Wilde's novel The Picture of Dorian Gray.

For instance, Richard Barham Middleton's poem "The Bathing Boy" idealizes the beauty of a nude boy diving into a lake:

I saw him standing idly on the brim
Of the quick river, in his beauty clad,
So fair he was that Nature looked at him
And touched him with her sunbeams here and there
So that his cool flesh sparkled, and his hair
Blazed like a crown above the naked lad.

And so I wept; I have seen lovely things,
Maidens and stars and roses all a-nod
In moonlit seas, but Love without his wings
Set in the azure of an August sky,
Was all too fair for my mortality,
And so I wept to see the little god.

Till with a sudden grace of silver skin
And golden lock he dived, his song of joy
Broke with the bubbles as he bore them in;
And lo, the fear of night was on that place,
Till decked with new-found gems and flushed of face
He rose again, a laughing, choking boy.

While some individuals celebrated same-sex love in pederasty, others also imposed a moral repudiation onto it as a degradation of the youthful soul. British authorities codified this view with Section 11 of the Criminal Law Amendment Act 1885, the Labouchere Amendment. This piece of legislation cemented the discussion on pederasty and its reception by the public and mainstream media with the legal prosecution of Oscar Wilde, whose novel The Picture of Dorian Gray was used as evidence to secure his imprisonment and conviction, labeling him as a "sodomite" under the eyes of the law.

Pederasty also frequently occurred in the late-19th-century Decadent movement, which took place amidst the European literary and artistic community. Decadents used pederasty to reinforce their own identity and non-conformance with heterosexuality. The movement led to the emergence of the coterie known as the Uranians, who often produced poetry and art centered around pederasty. However, these artistic forms often lacked explicit descriptions or depictions; Henry Scott Tuke often painted nude boys without showing their genitals or physical contact between them. The group provided intimacy, writing their works to share them amongst themselves, to provide a safe space and a source of consolidation for those who admired pederasty, devising it as "erotically and aesthetically superior to heterosexuality".

Though 19th-century Europeans took inspiration from the Greeks regarding pederastic relationships, the social context of pederasty during this time period differed from Ancient Greek pederasty. Nineteenth-century European pederasty did not share the factor of community acknowledgement and lacked the notion of "asymmetry" in relationships, including age disparity and social status, as an expectation and aspiration. Sandra Boehringer and Stefano Caciagli comment that Ancient Greek and other ancient societies existed "before sexuality". Having a preference for gender or age did not assign a label to a relationship, but this did not preclude groups from disapproving of or enacting laws against pederastic practices.

==== Pederasty in boarding schools ====
During the 19th and 20th centuries, all-male elite British boarding schools such as Eton College and Harrow School held a common but officially forbidden culture of pederasty between older and younger students. The strict fagging system where older students could choose a younger student to carry out orders for them contributed to this culture of pederasty, as older students often forced younger students to perform sexual acts with each other. However, various boarding school romances involving mutual agreement (legal consent for same-sex intercourse did not exist at the time) also existed; Alexander Thynn, 7th Marquess of Bath recounts numerous same-sex romances at Eton College in his memoir Top Hat and Tails (Strictly Private).

Students at boarding schools typically tolerated same-sex relationships if they possessed an element of gynephilia involving a more masculine (and typically older) student penetrating a more feminine (and typically younger) student's anus, mouth, or thighs. Older students often viewed the lack of body hair on younger students as a symbol of femininity and permissible gynephilic relationships. Students often inspected the bodies of other boys using communal showers and nude swimming to identify students they wanted to engage in relationships with. During this time, Eton College often segregated older and younger students from one another during nude swimming to avoid these relationships.

Despite the frequency of these relationships, schoolmasters universally prohibited their occurrence because of antisodomy laws and the cultural climate of the time. Depending on the time, place, and situation, school officials expelled or beat students for engaging in same-sex relationships, but these consequences did not lead to imprisonment or a serious criminal record.

==== Pederasty in the British Navy ====
During the 17th, 18th and 19th century, British naval ships often recruited adolescent boys who engaged in various forms of pederasty, both consenting and nonconsensual. Penalties for pederasty involved execution (in the earlier centuries) and lashes and expulsion from the Navy (in the later centuries) for both the man and boy (if consenting) or for only the man in instances of rape. Surgeons occasionally inspected boys' anuses to check for pederasty.

=== Islamic world ===
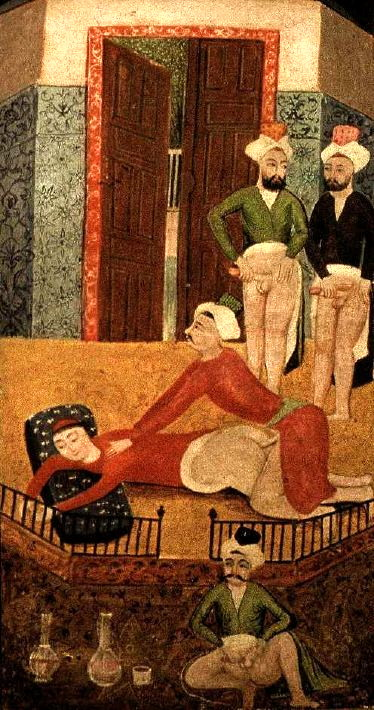
An Ottoman miniature from the book Sawaqub al-Manaquib depicting a young male being used by a group of men for anal sex

During the Islamic Golden Age, pederasty was present in upper-class and artistic circles, despite its official religious prohibition. Literature from this time period assumed that most men held sexual desires toward both women and adolescent boys at the age of fourteen or older. Poetry and art often depicted homoerotic themes and same-sex intercourse without shame or public outrage. This informal social acceptance led European intellectuals to associate pederasty and other forms of homosexuality with Islam and heresy.

The social acceptance of pederasty in the Islamic world ended with the growth and governmental integration of fundamentalist movements such as Wahhabism and Khomeinism, which proscribe the death penalty for all consenting acts of homosexuality. Although some modern Westernized sects of Islam such as Muslims for Progressive Values accept consenting homosexual acts as halal, no modern Islamic societies or groups tolerate pederasty.

=== Oceania ===
==== New Guinea ====
The Simbari people traditionally incorporated pederasty as part of the ritual initiation into manhood. Prepubescent boys were removed from their mothers and taken to a temple where older boys danced in front of them, making sexual gestures and younger boys performed fellatio on the older boys. Throughout puberty, older males penetrated younger boys to teach them about sexual intercourse and prepare them for marriage. The Keraki people historically practiced a similar custom, but with boys playing the receptive role in anal intercourse until facial hair develops. The Kaluli people hosted ceremonies known as bau a once every several years, where older men engage in anal intercourse inside a dark room with boys and younger men across a wide age range (depending on their age during the community's first bau a). The Kaluli people believed that anal intercourse improved boys' growth and maturity; leaders forced disobedient boys to return to their family longhouses. Women did not receive any information of what occurred during the bau a; men and boys used a special code language to conceal their rituals. The Biami people and Onabasulu people traditionally required young boys to masturbate older men and rub their semen on their skin; the Onabasulu people equated semen to medicine.

==== Solomon Islands ====
In the Nggela Islands, most men traditionally partook in sexual intercourse with multiple boys from the ages of seven to eleven years old, both before and after marriage. Traditional culture did not view discussion of pederasty with friends and family members as a social taboo.

==== Vanuatu ====
In Malakula, many men held boy-wives in combination with or as a substitute for adult female wives. Members of the lower classes had a higher tendency of possessing boy-wives than the chief caste.

==== Australia ====
===== Precolonial era =====
The Warlpiri people traditionally designated all initiated boys as the "boy-wife" of their future father-in-law in their traditional system of arranged marriages. Initiation traditionally occurs between the ages of 9 to 12; the subsequent form of pederasty involved anal intercourse, with a boy's anus equated to a girl's vagina in terms of its perceived sexual importance. Various aboriginal tribes of Central Australia, including the Warlpiri people, also traditionally allow children to sexually experiment with both same and opposite gender children before marriage.

===== 18th-20th centuries =====
Pederasty, along with consensual same-sex intercourse among adult men, often occurred among convicts sent to Australia during the 18th and 19th centuries. Same-sex couples often engaged in legally unrecognized marriages. Boys and young men often sold themselves into prostitution to gain better provisions and living conditions. English convicts tended to engage in same-sex intercourse at a higher rate than Irish convicts.

During World War II, American servicemen housed at local YMCAs and other forms of makeshift barracks in Australia often engaged in sexual intercourse with local men and boys who used these facilities for their original purposes.

=== United States and Canada ===
Although illegal, a significant pederastic subculture existed among working class laborers, hobos, and unhoused people in the United States and Canada during the early 20th century. These relationships typically involved small-scale prostitution involving occasional and agreed upon sexual encounters rather than human trafficking or coercion. Period authors typically blamed the existence of pederasty among impoverished men on isolation from women rather than a modern understanding of pedophilia and sexual orientation.

== Pederasty in literature ==
=== Hellenism and Homosexuality in Victorian Oxford (1994) ===
Linda C. Dowling, author of Hellenism and Homosexuality in Victorian Oxford, discusses the intricacies of homosexuality and homoeroticism that were part of Victorian culture in mid-century Oxford. Pederasty was briefly mentioned in lieu of William Hurrell Mallock's The New Republic, which is a parody of "aesthetic" verse in the epigraph for the Oxford pamphlet Boy-Worship, where pederasty is cited as "being a mode of male romantic attachment". In The New Republic, Mallock mocks many important figures in Oxford University, including Walter Pater and Oscar Wilde, and its references to Aestheticism and Hellenism.

In Dowling’s Hellenism and Homosexuality in Victorian Oxford, it was noted that William Johnson Cory's classic paen paiderastia, Ionica (1858), enabled the Oxford cult of “boy worship” to surface, and influence the upbringing of the Uranian literary movement, which celebrated “heavenly” love between men, which is highly influenced by Plato's Symposium of 180e. Similarly to pederasty, Uranians have been influenced by the Ancient Greek to write poetry that represented homoeroticism and homosexuality of adolescent boys in the Decadent era. Dowling notes these detailed accounts of many different scholars in Victorian Oxford in order to reform the homosexual studies of Hellenistic culture that influenced the Decadent movement of the nineteenth century.

=== The Happy Prince and Other Tales (1888) ===
Oscar Wilde expresses a pederastic ethos to his stories by focusing on the intersection between “sensual experience and moral enlightenment." Beginning in 1885, Wilde would look for attractive boys and invite them to a dinner party under the notion of mutual pleasure and the satisfaction of all the senses; emphasizing “physical senses as a means to artistry.” Wilde often utilized fairy-tale conventions by writing events and actions in threes, clarifying structure by repeating images or phrases, and using biblical style and diction. "The Happy Prince" is the first tale in The Happy Prince and Other Tales (1888) that describes a growing relationship between a Prince and a Swallow until they both meet their fateful deaths.

In Wilde’s general story model, the connection between the older and younger man is spurred by the fact that they are completely different in nature. The Prince is a large statue towering over the city, inherently an inanimate object, while the Sparrow is a tiny bird, always moving “of a family famous for its agility.” In this work, the Prince is portrayed as a youthful character, as his own experience in life has been limited to playing with his companions in the garden and dancing in the Great Hall. His childishness is also seen in his lack of knowledge regarding emotions, as he “did not know what tears were,” living a life “where sorrow is not allowed to enter.” The Swallow is older, as he has had many experiences in life, having traveled to many places. In addition to this foundation of inequality, exchanging ideas is also a vital proponent of pederastic thoughts. The Prince educates the Sparrow on the cruelties of the city he oversees, teaching him societal virtues. The story ends with the Sparrow asking the Prince, “Will you let me kiss your hand?” and the Prince responds, “But you must kiss me on the lips, for I love you," showing the extremely intense love that is shared between these two male figures. This story presents a pederastic view of a tale where there is mutual growth between student and teacher.

=== Other literary works ===
==== Ancient era ====
- Phaedrus (370 BCE) by Plato
- Symposium a liber amoris (375-370 BCE) by Plato
- Satyricon (1st century) by Gaius Petronius
- Amores (2nd-4th century) by unknown author (spuriously attributed to Lucian)

==== Early modern era ====
- Alcibiades the Schoolboy (1652) by Anonymous
- Ionica (1858) by William Johnson Cory
- The Romance of Lust (1873–1876) by Anonymous
- The New Republic (1877) by William Hurrell Mallock
- Boy-Worship (1880) by Charles Edward Hutchinson
- The Sins of the Cities of the Plain (1881) by Jack Saul (pseudonym)
- Psychopathia Sexualis (1886) by Richard von Krafft-Ebing
- The Happy Prince and Other Tales (1888) by Oscar Wilde
- Long Ago (1889) by Michael Field (aka Katherine Bradley and Edith Cooper)
- The Picture of Dorian Gray (1890) by Oscar Wilde
- Teleny, or The Reverse of the Medal (1893) by Anonymous

==== Modern era ====
- Death in Venice (1912) by Thomas Mann
- The White Paper (1928) by Jean Cocteau
- Parents' Day (1951) by Paul Goodman
- Quaint Honor (1958) by Roger Gellert
- The Wrong People (1967) by Robin Maugham
- Street of Stairs (1968) by Ronald Tavel
- Boychick (1971) by Leo Skir

=== Contemporary online pederastic literature ===
Various sites, such as Archive of Our Own and Nifty Erotic Stories Archive, contain original pederastic literature written by pseudonymous authors. The presence of stories with pederastic themes has led to various controversies, with users of Archive of Our Own occasionally flagging these stories as "offensive." In response, Stacey Lantagne, a volunteer from the legal committee of its parent organization known as the Organization for Transformative Works has stated "The OTW's mission is to advocate on behalf of transformative works, not just the ones we like."

== Modern view ==
Age of consent for male same-sex intercourse in 2023, although some countries have differing ages for the definition of statutory rape. Same-sex relations banned 21 19 18 17 16 13-15 Unknown/No age set

In the modern era, the local age of consent determines whether a person is considered legally competent to consent to sexual acts and whether such contact is child sexual abuse or statutory rape, although some countries have a separate age to define statutory rape (for instance, in Ecuador, the age of consent is 14 but adults can be accused of statutory rape in some circumstances for engaging in sexual intercourse with any person younger than 18). Several US states and some countries continue to legally permit consensual sexual relations between adults and older adolescents, but others prohibit all sexual relations under the age of 18. Modern authorities prohibit adults from engaging in sexual activity with minors below the age of consent because of the psychological and physical harm that it inflicts. Studies correlate child sexual abuse with depression, post-traumatic stress disorder and anxiety.

Stop It Now!, an American organization combating sexual abuse, defines child sexual abuse as "sexual touching between an adult and a child" and "sexual behavior (looking, showing, or touching) with a child to meet the adult’s interest or sexual needs." Non-contact sexual abuse includes exposing minors to pornography and placing minors in situations involving nudity (outside of naturism and traditional ethnic practices).

Pedophile advocacy groups support the relegalization of sexual intercourse between adults and minors (or the lowering of the age of consent in jurisdictions that set it below 18) and perceive these relationships as not harmful to minors. Contemporary pedophiles from these groups often describe themselves as "boy lovers" and sometimes appeal to practices in Ancient Greece to justify sexual relationships between adults and minors.

== See also ==
- Bacha bazi
- Catamite
- Greek love
- History of erotic depictions
- History of homosexuality
- History of human sexuality
- Homoeroticism
- Homosexuality in ancient Greece
- Homosexuality in ancient Rome
- Homosexuality in China
- Homosexuality in India
- Homosexuality in Japan
- Intercrural sex
- Kagema
- Köçek
- Korephilia
- List of pedophile advocacy organizations
- North American Man/Boy Love Association
- Pederasty in ancient Greece
- Sexuality in ancient Rome
- Wakashū
