= Johnny Dodd =

Lighting designer

- Johnny Dodd behind his stage lighting control board
- Born: John P. Dodd; June 25, 1941
- Died: July 15, 1991 (aged 50); New York City, U.S.
- Occupations: Lighting designer, actor, director

Johnny Dodd (a.k.a. John P. Dodd) (June 25, 1941 – July 15, 1991) was an off-off-Broadway lighting designer for theater, dance and music concerts in the downtown art scene in Lower Manhattan during the latter half of the 20th century. He designed lighting for Judson Poets Theater, La MaMa Experimental Theatre Club, the Theater for the New City and the glam rock band New York Dolls. He also acted in underground art films and plays and in 1973 directed the Anthony Clarvoe play City of Light based on the City of Light novel by Lauren Belfer.

== Career achievements ==
During the 1960s, Dodd was resident lighting designer at the Caffe Cino after starting work there as a waiter in 1961. In 1967, Dodd received an Obie Award for his work on Søren Agenoux's A Christmas Carol, Lanford Wilson's The Madness of Lady Bright and Tom Eyen's White Whore and the Bit Player. Dodd also worked on productions at Judson Memorial Church, La MaMa and Theatre Genesis. During the 1970s, he served as lighting director on the New York Dolls tours and worked with theater director Robert Wilson. He later founded and served as the president of the 14th Street Stage Lighting Inc. Towards the end of his life, Dodd worked at The Living Theater.

== Underground film and theater appearances ==
Dodd was featured in Andy Warhol's 1963 film Haircut No. 3 (a.k.a. Salome and Delilah) and he also appeared kissing Fred Herko in Warhol's 1963 film Kiss. Dodd performed on stage the role of Juanita Castro in Ronald Tavel’s absurdist play The Life of Juanita Castro that was turned into a Warhol film also called The Life of Juanita Castro. He also performed in these off-off-Broadway plays: Leonard Melfi's Times Square (1967), Sam Shepard's Melodrama Play (1967), Rochelle Owens's Futz (1967), Changes (1968), and Nova (1969).

== Fred Herko suicide ==
On October 27, 1964, strung out and homeless Andy Warhol superstar Fred Herko, who was romantically involved with Dodd, went to Dodd's fifth-floor apartment at 5 Cornelia Street to take a bath. According to Dodd, Mozart's Coronation Mass was playing as Herko emerged from the bath and danced naked in the loft. As the music climaxed, Herko leapt through the open window and fell to his death five floors down.

== Death ==
Dodd died in 1991, reportedly from AIDS, at the age of 50.

== Legacy ==
In 2011, Fast Books published the book Johnny! by Village Voice critic Michael Townsend Smith that recounts much of the life of Johnny Dodd. Smith was from 1964 to 1971 Dodd's romantic partner. In 2017, Fast Books published a book of Johhny Dodd's collages entitled My Funny Valentine Collages under his full name John P. Dodd.

== La MaMa credits ==
Dodd's credits at La MaMa included extensive lighting work as well as some acting and directing:

Lighting Design

- The Vacation (1964)
- So Who's Afraid of Edward Albee? (1964)
- The Recluse (1964)
- The Hessian Corporal (1966)
- Times Square (1968)
- Melodrama Play (1968)
- Futz (1968)
- Changes (1968)
- 9 to 5 to 0 (1969)
- Hurricane of the Eye (1969)
- Solar Inventions (1969)
- A Rat's Mass (1969, 1971)
- In Praise of Folly (1969)
- Wanton Soup (1969)
- Eye in New York (1969)
- Nova (1969)
- Big Charlotte (1969)
- Sprint Orgasmics (1969)
- Cock-Strong (1970)
- Heaven Grand in Amber Orbit (1970)
- Ubu (1970)
- Arden of Faversham (1970)
- Son of Cock-Strong (1970)
- Captain Jack's Revenge (1970)
- Shaved Splits (1970)
- Night Club, or Bubi's Hideaway (1970)
- The Monkeys of the Organ Grinder (1970)
- Toy Show (1970)
- Cranes and Peonies (1970)
- La Cabeza del Bautista (1970)
- La Rosa de Papel (1970)
- Thief (1971)
- The Red Horse Animation (1971)
- Sissy (1972)
- Persia, A Desert Cheapie (1972)
- Satyricon (1972)
- Pomp.eii (1972)
- Audition! (1972)
- Sobechanskaya Dances (1972)
- Thoughts (1972)
- Silver Queen (1973)
- The White Whore and the Bit Player (1973)
- The Golem (1974)
- Stone (1974)
- Big Mother (1974)
- Starfollowers in an Ancient Land (1975)

Directing

- City of Light (1973)

Performing

- Times Square (1967)
- Melodrama Play (1967)
- Futz (1967)
- Changes (1968)
- The Life of Juanita Castro (1968)
- Nova (1969)
