= Sexual Experience Between Men and Boys =

1976 book

- Author: Parker Rossman
- Genre: Nonfiction
- Publisher: Association Press
- Publication date: 1976
- Publication place: United States
- Pages: 247
- ISBN: 978-0809619115

Sexual Experience Between Men and Boys: Exploiting the Pederast Underground is a 1976 book by American historian and Yale professor Parker Rossman. The book examines the prevalence and dynamics of pederasty in the United States, which Rossman defines as "any sexual experience, involvement or act between a male over eighteen and one of between twelve and sixteen".

The book presents conclusions drawn from data collected from about 1,000 pederast men and 300 boys. Aside from homosexual relationships, Rossman also examines sexual experiences between heterosexual men and boys. The book was published to generally positive reviews in the 1970s. It has also been criticized for improperly synthesizing data and lacking clarity.
