= Beautiful Agony =

Erotic website

- Website type: Erotic
- Owners: Richard Lawrence & Lauren Olney
- Website: beautifulagony.com
- Registration: monthly subscription
- Launched: 2004
- Current status: active

Beautiful Agony is a paid-subscription erotic website owned and operated by Feck Pty Ltd in Melbourne, featuring head shots of user-submitted videos showing the participant having orgasms, without providing any visual description of what technique is being used or revealing anything below the neck and upper chest. Both men and women are featured on the site, and are nicknamed Agonees. Videos that do not look natural (too much makeup for example) are not accepted by the website's moderators.

== History ==
In 2003 Richard Lawrence and Lauren Olney created the initial video series. In 2004 beautifulagony.com was established as a commercial website.

== In popular culture ==
Video clips of the website were part of exhibitions at the Museum of Sex in New York and at the Hollywood Erotic Museum. The short film Anatomy: Face produced by Adele Wilkes and distributed by ABC Australia in 2011, focused on the users of Beautiful Agony.

== Awards ==
- 2009: Best Adult Website at the Australian Adult Industry Awards

== See also ==
- Blow Job (1963) – Warhol film
- Eating Too Fast (1966) – Warhol film
- Erotic art
- Erotic photography
