= Eating Too Fast =

1966 film by Andy Warhol

- Directed by: Andy Warhol
- Produced by: Andy Warhol
- Starring: Gregory Battcock
- Release date: 1966
- Running time: 67 minutes
- Country: United States
- Language: English

Eating Too Fast is a 1966 Andy Warhol film made at The Factory. It was originally titled Blow Job #2 and features art critic and writer Gregory Battcock (1937–1980). The film is 67 minutes long and is, in effect, a black and white sound film remake of Warhol's Blow Job (1964). Battcock had previously appeared in Warhol's films Batman Dracula (1964) and Horse (1965).

== Production background ==
The British Film Institute catalogue says that the first half of the film is a still shot, showing Battcock eating an apple and taking a phone call, while apparently receiving fellatio. The second half of the film has more camera movement. Battcock's diaries say the film was made in Battcock's Greenwich Village apartment with Warhol and Lou Reed present for the filming.

== See also ==
- Andy Warhol filmography
- Art film
- Blue Movie (1969) – Warhol film
- Eat (1964) – Warhol film
- Erotic photography
- Golden Age of Porn (1969–1984)
- Kiss (1964) – Warhol film
- List of American films of 1966
- Sleep (1964) – Warhol film
