= Blow Job (1964 film) =

1964 Andy Warhol film

- Directed by: Andy Warhol
- Produced by: Andy Warhol
- Starring: DeVeren Bookwalter
- Release date: 1964
- Running time: 35 minutes
- Country: United States
- Language: Silent film

Blow Job is a 1964 American silent film directed by Andy Warhol. It depicts the face of an uncredited DeVeren Bookwalter as he apparently receives fellatio from an unseen partner. While shot at 24 frames per second, Warhol specified that it should be projected at 16 frames per second, slowing it down by a third.

Despite the salacious title, the film shows only the expression on the young man's face; the implied sexual act itself is not seen. Whether it is a male or a female performing the act is not stated, and the viewer must assume that fellatio is occurring. The salaciousness has also been speculated to be entirely in the title with no fellatio actually being performed.

== Background and production ==
The identity of the person performing the act is disputed. Poet Willard Maas has been identified as the person performing the act, but Warhol states in his book Popism: The Warhol Sixties (1980) that five different boys performed the fellatio. In his book, Warhol writes that he originally asked Charles Rydell, the boyfriend of filmmaker Jerome Hill, to star in the film, promising that there would be five different boys to perform the act.

However, when Warhol set up the film shoot at The Factory on a Sunday, Rydell failed to show up. Warhol phoned Rydell at Hill's suite at the Algonquin Hotel and asked where Rydell was. Rydell replied that he thought Warhol was kidding, and had no intention of appearing in such a film. When he declined, Andy used "a good-looking kid that happened to be hanging around the Factory that day", who was later identified as Bookwalter.

== Release ==
According to Warhol, the first public screening of his film was at Ruth Kligman's Washington Square Art Gallery, in the fall of 1964. Jonas Mekas's Film Culture Non-Profit Organization sponsored the screening, but the event remained unadvertised due to the recent seizures of sexually explicit experimental films.

== Commentary ==
According to Peter Gidal, the film distances the viewer from the experience it purportedly depicts, "Sometimes the young actor looks bored, sometimes as if he is thinking, sometimes as if he is aware of the camera, sometimes as if he is not." Douglas Crimp states that after a few minutes, "it becomes clear that we will see nothing more than the repetition, with slight variations, of what we've already seen". This frees the mind to look in a different way. Likewise, the sexual act has the effect of distracting the actor from the presence of the camera, creating a unique kind of unself-consciousness. The film becomes "a lesson in how to produce a really beautiful portrait without saying 'cheese'!"

Critic Roy Grundmann argues that "Blow Job‘s self-reflexive devices create a new kind of spectatorial address that dislodges audiences from their contemplative positions in a number of ways. Blow Job‘s reflexivity makes spectators intensely aware that seeing a film makes projecting onto and investing into an image a part of oneself which is also a socialized acculturated act". Grundmann further claims that "viewers oscillate between an awareness of their contingency on larger scheme and the promise of ocularcentric mastery of the image".

Stephen Smith wrote in The Guardian that "there’s no doubt about the period shock value of Warhol's Blow Job; the viewer only sees the lucky or otherwise recipient, a man by the name of DeVeren Bookwalter, from the waist up. Warhol liked to provoke, but what he really wanted was to be taken seriously by the big boys in Hollywood, and perhaps even to join them one day."

== Sequel ==
In 1966, Warhol filmed a sequel, Eating Too Fast (originally titled Blow Job #2) which runs 67 minutes with sound. It features art critic and writer Gregory Battcock as the recipient.

== See also ==
- Andy Warhol filmography
- Beautiful Agony
- Erotic art
- Erotic photography
- Golden Age of Porn
- List of American films of 1964
- List of LGBTQ-related films of 1964
- Unsimulated sex
