= Henry Geldzahler (film) =

- Directed by: Andy Warhol
- Produced by: Andy Warhol
- Starring: Henry Geldzahler
- Distributed by: The Factory
- Release date: July 1964
- Running time: 97 minutes
- Country: United States
- Language: English

Henry Geldzahler (1964) is a feature-length underground film directed by Andy Warhol, featuring art curator Henry Geldzahler smoking a cigar and becoming increasingly uncomfortable for 97 minutes. The film was shot silent and in black-and-white in the first week of July 1964, using unused film left from the filming of Empire.

== See also ==
- List of American films of 1964
- Andy Warhol filmography
