= Parker Rossman =

American educator and author

Parker Rossman (died 2013) was an American educator, clergyman and author. He has collaborated with the World Council of Churches, among other international Christian organizations.

Rossman is the author of Sexual Experience Between Men and Boys (1976), a book that examines the dynamics and prevalence of sexual acts between adult men and boys between the ages of twelve and sixteen in the United States. He has also authored Pirate Slave (1977), a novel about a young American sailor who becomes a white slave and then an adoptive son of an Arab pirate.

== Bibliography ==
- Rossman, P. (1992). The Emerging Worldwide Electronic University: Information Age Global Higher Education. Greenwood Press.
- Rossman, P. (1976). Sexual Experience Between Men and Boys: Exploring the Pederast Underground. Association Press.
- Rossman, Parker (1977). Pirate Slave. T. Nelson.

== See also ==
- David Riegel
