= Salvador Dalí (film) =

1966 short film by Andy Warhol

Salvador Dalí is a 1966 35-minute film directed by Andy Warhol. The film features the Spanish artist Salvador Dalí visiting The Factory and meeting the rock band The Velvet Underground.

== See also ==
- Andy Warhol filmography
