= The Velvet Underground and Nico: A Symphony of Sound =

1966 film by Andy Warhol and Paul Morrissey

The Velvet Underground and Nico: A Symphony of Sound From left to right: Lou Reed, Sterling Morrison, Nico, Maureen Tucker, and John Cale (side to camera)

The Velvet Underground and Nico: A Symphony of Sound is a 1966 American film by Andy Warhol and Paul Morrissey. The film was made at The Factory on January 3, 1966. It is 67 minutes long and was filmed in 16mm black and white.

== Plot ==
The film depicts the first band practice of The Velvet Underground and Nico, and is essentially one long loose improvisation. Lou Reed and Sterling Morrison play their electric guitars (Gretsch Country Gentleman and Vox Phantom respectively), Maureen Tucker plays her 3-piece drum kit consisting of a rack tom, snare drum, bass drum and single cymbal, John Cale plays his electric viola and Nico bashes a single maraca against a tambourine. The boy at Nico's feet is her 3-yr old son Ari (Christian Aaron Boulogne), whose father was the French actor Alain Delon. Reed is shown teaching Nico the lyrics to "Venus in Furs". There is also an attempt at a full song, "There She Goes Again", with Nico on lead vocals. Cale subsequently switches to bass and at some stage, he creates feedback on a wooden frame from a piano while Nico plays on Cale's Fender Precision Bass. Cale soon switches back to his viola and near the end of the film, the rehearsal is disrupted by the arrival of the New York police, supposedly in response to a noise complaint.

The film was intended to be shown at live Velvet Underground shows during setup and tuning.

== See also ==
- List of American films of 1966
- Andy Warhol filmography
- The Velvet Underground & Nico - album
