= Harlot (1964 film) =

- Directed by: Andy Warhol
- Written by: Ronald Tavel
- Produced by: Andy Warhol
- Starring: Mario Montez; Gerard Malanga
- Distributed by: The Factory
- Release date: December 1964
- Running time: 67 minutes
- Country: United States
- Language: English

Harlot is a 1964 American underground film directed by Andy Warhol, written by Ronald Tavel, and featuring Mario Montez lounging on a sofa, eating bananas, with Gerard Malanga in a tuxedo, and with Tavel, Billy Name, and Harry Fainlight having an off-screen discussion. This was Warhol's first sync-sound movie, filmed in December 1964 with his new Auricon camera.

== See also ==
- List of American films of 1964
- Andy Warhol filmography
