= David Riegel =

American author

David L. Riegel
- Born: December 12, 1931; Ohio, United States
- Died: April 12, 2019; Colorado, United States
- Period: 2000 - 2011
- Genre: Nonfiction

David L. Riegel was an American author.

== Career ==
Riegel is the author of Understanding Loved Boys and Boylovers (2000), published by the SafeHaven Foundation Press. The book was met with mixed reviews on Amazon. In 2002, the California-based conservative group United States Justice Foundation announced that it would file a lawsuit against Amazon under the state's unfair business practices laws if the company did not pull the book from its website. The foundation's actions were supported by conservative activists including Jerry Falwell and Richard Ackerman, the latter of whom criticized Amazon at Fox News' The O'Reilly Factor, stating that the company was bringing children in contact with "that sick world". Amazon spokeswoman Patricia Smith stated that the book was protected by the First Amendment of the United States Constitution and that the company had no plans to ban the book from its online store. Barnes & Noble also stated that they used to sell the book and that they do not "censor inventory". Riegel said that his book had been misunderstood as a "how-to-molest-children" guide.

In 2004, he published Beyond Hysteria: Boy Erotica on the Internet, a book that he described as an empirical and dispassionate study that attempts to differentiate boy erotica from child pornography. The book includes Riegel's analysis of questionnaire data that he collected from members of boy erotica websites. Riegel argues in the book that men who are sexually attracted to boys have been misunderstood by society and that sexual relationships between men and boys can be mutual and desirable, a position that he has also defended elsewhere. A review from the Electronic Journal of Human Sexuality stated that the book "falls well short of his goals", "tending more towards diatribe than dialogue; less reason and more rant".

University of Zaragoza professor Agustín Malón wrote that Riegel's view that sexual relations between men and boys should be allowed if the boys are willing to participate in those experiences was "too simplistic and inadequately considered", as was the fear that the recognition of the fact that minors can be sexually attracted to adults would necessarily imply that such relationships should be accepted. He wrote that "this overly simplistic connection between facts and moral beliefs is working against our comprehension of the human sexual condition".

Riegel has stated that relationships between men and boys should be viewed as "non-homosexual" in nature and that such sexual attractions should not be conflated with LGBT identities. A published article by Richard Yuill and Dean Durber stated that his view that male sexual attraction to boys is characteristically "non-homosexual" has not been widely adopted by historians and cross-cultural researchers, and that many pro-pedophile groups have sought to associate with gay and lesbian groups during the 20th century.

== Bibliography ==
- The Role of Androphilia in the Psychosexual Development of Boys (2011)
- Beyond Hysteria: Boy Erotica on the Internet (2004)
- Understanding Loved Boys and Boylovers (2000)
