= Henry Geldzahler =

Belgian-American art curator (1935–1994)

- Born: July 9, 1935; Antwerp, Belgium
- Died: August 16, 1994 (aged 59); Southampton, New York, U.S.
- Resting place: Green River Cemetery
- Education: Yale University; Harvard University
- Occupations: Curator, art historian, art critic

Henry Geldzahler (July 9, 1935 – August 16, 1994) was a Belgian-born American curator of contemporary art in the late 20th century, as well as a historian and critic of modern art. He is best known for his work at the Metropolitan Museum of Art and as New York City Commissioner of Cultural Affairs, and for his social role in the art world with a close relationship with contemporary artists.

He has been described as "the most powerful and controversial art curator alive" and the art critic of The New Yorker magazine Calvin Tomkins said "If you were involved in any way in the [cultural] world, you met Henry".

== Life and career ==
Born in Antwerp, Belgium, Geldzahler's Jewish family emigrated to the United States in 1940. He graduated from Yale University in 1957, where he was a member of Manuscript Society. After graduating from Yale, he began work on a doctorate in art history at Harvard University.

In 1960, Geldzahler left Harvard to join the staff of the Metropolitan Museum of Art in New York. He became the Curator for American Art there, and later the first Curator for 20th Century Art.

Among his closest friends were artist Andy Warhol and David Hockney. Geldzahler is the subject of the underground Warhol film Henry Geldzahler (1964), which features him smoking a cigar.

His time at the Met is most known for his landmark 1969 exhibition, New York Painting and Sculpture: 1940-1970, which included his favorite contemporary work and became the talk of the town. It was the Museum's first exhibition of contemporary American art and marked both the inauguration of the newly established department of Contemporary Arts and the 100th anniversary of the Museum. The exhibition featured 408 works in 35 galleries, by 43 artists including Arshile Gorky, Jackson Pollock, Frank Stella, David Smith, Jasper Johns, Mark Rothko, Andy Warhol, and Robert Rauschenberg. "My guiding principles in deciding which artists to include in the exhibition have been the extent to which their work has commanded critical attention or significantly deflected the course of recent art", said Geldzahler in the press release of the exhibition.

In 1966, he was the United States commissioner to the Venice Biennale, for which he selected the American artists to be exhibited.

In 1966 he took a temporary leave from the Met to become the first director of the visual arts program of the National Endowment for the Arts, where he initiated a program of museum grants for the purchase of art made by living American artists.

Geldzahler is depicted in portraits by several of his artist friends, including a famous 1969 double portrait by David Hockney of Geldzahler with his then-partner, painter Christopher Scott. Other artists who painted his portrait include Andy Warhol, Frank Stella, and Alice Neel. "There are lots of pictures of Henry. He didn’t have many mirrors in his home. He knew what he looked like just by asking people to make portraits of him.’ Hockney said.

Geldzahler appeared, as himself, in the David Hockney biopic, A Bigger Splash (1974).

In 1978 Geldzahler left the Met and was succeeded in his role there by Thomas B. Hess. He was then appointed the Commissioner of Cultural Affairs for New York City by Mayor Edward I. Koch.

As an openly gay man who was part of the Koch administration and the conservative Metropolitan Museum of Art, Geldzahler contributed significant time and effort to AIDS-related causes. Raymond Foye, publisher of Hanuman Books, was his companion for many years.

After leaving his New York City government cultural post, he continued to write on art, and acted as an independent curator, working at the alternative space P.S. 1 and the austere high modernist Dia Art Foundation.

== Death ==
Geldzahler died of liver cancer on August 16, 1994, at his home in Southampton, New York. He was 59 years old.

He is buried in Green River Cemetery in Springs, New York.

== Writings ==
Geldzahler wrote, among other works:

- Catalog of New York Painting and Sculpture: 1940-1970 (1969)
- American Painting in the 20th Century (Metropolitan Museum of Art, 1965),
- Charles Bell: The Complete Works, 1970-1990 (Abrams, 1991)
- Making It New: Essays, Interviews, and Talks (Harvest Books, 1996) with an introduction by Mr. Hockney.
- He co-wrote Art in Transit: Subway Drawings by Keith Haring (1984),
- Andy Warhol: Portraits of the Seventies and Eighties (Thames and Hudson, 1993)

== Legacy ==
In the song "Forever Changed" from the album Songs for Drella (1990), Lou Reed and John Cale, speaking and singing in the first person, as Andy Warhol, mention Geldzahler as one of the people who'd "seen [Warhol] through."

The documentary film Who Gets to Call It Art? (2006) by Peter Rosen explores the life of Geldzahler.
