= Kiss (1964 film) =

- Directed by: Andy Warhol
- Produced by: Andy Warhol
- Starring: Naomi Levine; Gerard Malanga; Rufus Collins; Johnny Dodd; Mark Lancaster; Ed Sanders; Fred Herko; Baby Jane Holzer; Marisol; Pierre Restany
- Production company: Andy Warhol Films
- Distributed by: The Factory
- Release date: 1964
- Running time: 50 minutes
- Country: United States
- Language: Silent film

Kiss is a 1964 American underground film directed by Andy Warhol. It was one of the first experimental films Warhol made at The Factory in New York City.

== Plot ==
The film runs 50 minutes and features various couples—heterosexuals and homosexuals—kissing for 3 and a half minutes each. The film features Barbara Rubin, Gerard Malanga, Johnny Dodd, Ed Sanders, Mark Lancaster, Baby Jane Holzer, and Robert Indiana.

== Soundtrack ==
In 1964, La Monte Young provided a loud minimalist drone soundtrack to Kiss when shown as small TV-sized projections at the entrance lobby to the third New York Film Festival held at Lincoln Center.

== Release ==
In July 1964, Kiss was shown with its predecessor Sleep at the Park Square Cinema in Boston.

In October 1964, 36 minutes of the film was intended to be screened at the University of Manitoba as part of an avant-garde film exhibition, but the censorship board in Winnipeg prohibited the showing of the film.

== See also ==
- Andy Warhol filmography
