= Quaint Honor =

1958 play by Roger Gellert

Quaint Honour
- Original language: English
- Written by: Roger Gellert

Premiere
- Date: 15 July 1958

Quaint Honour is a 1958 play by Roger Gellert whose subject is homosexuality in a school for young men.

== Synopsis ==
Set in a boy's boarding school in the late 1950s where homosexuality in the UK is illegal the play explores relationships, both platonic and sexual, between the students. When one of the pupils Tully accepts a challenge to seduce the younger student Hamilton, the ensuing affair results in both positive and negative repercussions. Hamilton gains confidence and certainty in his identity from the relationship whilst Tully struggles between guilt and genuine affection that eventually leads to his expulsion.

== Reception ==
Upon its premiere the play was not without controversy though Gellert received praise from various critics and publications for his exploration and presentation of 'contentious' themes. The Times Educational Supplement wrote " The author of Quaint Honour sets out not to apologise nor to shock. This is how boys behave, he suggests. And his precise, well-observed, well-acted play, presents us with boys being lectured about the facts of life [...] boys prating about God and blaspheming, boys trying to break each other like wild ponies."

"This is all so natural and true - and so rare - that the corollary that boys also make love to each other without ill effect is fed across the footlights and swallowed by the audience before they know what they are digesting."

"No one who sees it can feel quite the same way about homosexuality again - though it is by no means certain that he will be more tolerant towards its manifestations."

== Revival ==
In 2019 the Finborough Theatre presented the play for the first time since its world premiere in 1958, marking the fiftieth anniversary of the Sexual Offences Act which decriminalised homosexuality in the UK.

The production was directed by Christian Durham and the cast included Jack Archer, Harley Viveash, Simon Butteriss and Oliver Gully.

The revival received positive reviews with Sam Marlowe writing for The Times “Fascinating, seething with erotic intrigue and moral confusion [...] Christian Durham’s production is absorbing and acted with nuance and flavour.”

Andy Curtis drew comparisons to recent sexual misconduct allegations “The Finborough is committed to rediscovering lost gems, and they have certainly succeeded here. At a time that has seen allegations about abuses of power in the theatre world and beyond, the play’s exploration of power dynamics in sex also feels timely.”

Archer was nominated for Offie for Best Male in a Play (Hamilton).
