= You Are the One (Andy Warhol) =

You Are the One, by Andy Warhol, is an Amiga-made music video, created in 1985. You Are the One was Warhol's second foray with an Amiga computer, having originally made a video highlighting Debbie Harry. You Are the One featured animated Marilyn Monroe images, set to a short soundtrack. Long thought to be lost, the video was found on two old Amiga discs in Warhol's studio and was restored for display at the Museum of New Art in 2007.
