= Ronald Tavel =

American dramatist

- Tavel in c.1962
- Born: May 17, 1936; New York City, U.S.
- Died: March 23, 2009 (aged 72); Aboard a flight from Berlin, Germany to Bangkok, Thailand
- Education: Brooklyn College; University of Wyoming
- Occupations: Novelist, poet, screenwriter, director, actor
- Awards: Obie Award for Outstanding Contribution to Theater (1969)
- Website: ronaldtavel.com

Ronald Tavel (May 17, 1936 – March 23, 2009) was an American gay screenwriter, director, novelist, poet and actor, best known for his work with Andy Warhol and The Factory and the Theatre of the Ridiculous. Tavel was the founder, with the director John Vaccaro, of the Playhouse of the Ridiculous. He received the Obie Award for Outstanding Contribution to Theater in 1969 for the musical drama Boy On the Straight-Back Chair. He also wrote a novel about the pederastic experiences of an expatriate in Tangier, Morocco, called Street of Stairs published by Olympia Press in 1968.

== Early life ==
Born in Brooklyn, New York, Tavel graduated from Brooklyn College and later attended the University of Wyoming, where he earned a master's degree in creative writing in 1959.

== Career ==
Tavel worked as a screenwriter during the 1960s for many of Andy Warhol's underground films including Chelsea Girls. Tavel worked with other members of Warhol's Factory crowd, including Freddie Herko, Ondine, Mary Woronov, Billy Name, Johnny Dodd and Brigid Berlin.

Tavel later founded, named, and was heavily involved with the Playhouse of the Ridiculous, a New York City theater presenting works produced and directed by John Vaccaro, Harvey Tavel, and Charles Ludlam. Tavel provided the one-sentence manifesto for The Theatre of the Ridiculous: "We have passed beyond the Absurd: our position is absolutely preposterous."

In 1975, Tavel was appointed Artist-in-Residence at Yale Divinity School for his contributions to formal theology and religious theater (notably, the Obie-Award-winning play Bigfoot). In 1977, he was re-appointed to that position for the three-act play Gazelle Boy.

In 1980, he was appointed the First Playwright-in-Residence at Cornell University where he was commissioned to write the melodrama, The Understudy, directed and designed by Michael Hillyer, which starred a young Jimmy Smits. In 1986, Tavel was appointed Distinguished Visiting assistant professor in creative writing at the University of Colorado Boulder.

== Death ==
On March 23, 2009, Tavel died of a heart attack on a flight from Berlin to Bangkok at the age of 73. Tavel had lived in Bangkok for twelve years.

== Selected works ==
- Chelsea Girls (1966)
- Hedy (1966)
- Kitchen (1965)
- The Life of Juanita Castro (1965) as the Stage Manager and on-screen director
- Poor Little Rich Girl (1965)
- Horse (1965) as Illuminary
- Space (1965)
- Screen Test #1 (1965) as off-screen interrogator
- Screen Test #2 (1965) as off-screen interrogator
- Vinyl (1965)
- Harlot (1964)
- Street of Stairs (1968 novel)
