= Museum of New Art =

The Museum of New Art, better known as MONA is the first popup museum, founded in 1996 and run by artists since then. The museum's locations have varied from the walk-in closet of a commercial gallery (rented for $1 per year), the second floor of a downtown office building, and now a satellite facility in Detroit's Russell Industrial Complex. The Russell facility was also the location where they awarded the first Prinzhorn International Art Prize whose recipients included Christo and Jeanne-Claude. Christo and Jeanne-Claude have also contributed to the museum's permanent collection, which comprises more than 200 small-scale pieces.

The museum was founded by Jef Bourgeau, a native Detroit artist who works in various mediums and who has exhibited his works in the U.S. and Europe.

At its largest, in 2003, the museum was over 40,000 square feet. As of 2010, it consists of seven galleries between Detroit and Pontiac, Michigan, totaling about 16,000 square feet. In its history, it has worked with a wide range of artists including: Sol LeWitt, Yoko Ono, and Iain Baxter.

The museum is perhaps most well known for its 1998 exhibit, MONA's Art Until Now at the Detroit Institute of Arts, that was shut down for fear of offending Christians, and the debut of the lost Andy Warhol You Are the One amid controversy.
