= Boychiks in the Hood =

1995 book by Robert Eisenberg

- Author: Robert Eisenberg
- Language: English
- Publication date: 1995

Boychiks in the Hood is a 1995 memoir by Robert Eisenberg that chronicles Eisenberg's travels around the world visiting different Hasidic communities. Einsenberg wrote the memoir as a way to explore communities where Yiddish was the first language spoken among all generations. It is widely recognized as a reputable source for information on Hasidic life.

The book's first chapter, eponymously named Boychiks in the Hood, takes place in Williamsburg, Brooklyn, and was initially published as a 1992 feature article in The Village Voice.

== Plot ==
Boychiks in the Hood is a first-person narrative memoir detailing the happenings of the Hasidic Jewish underground. As a secular Jew, Eisenberg relies on his knowledge of Yiddish to gain access to many highly insular ultra-Orthodox communities, where Yiddish is the native language.

Robert begins his travels in Williamsburg, Brooklyn, New York, where he spends Shabbat with members of the Satmar Hasidic sect. He goes on to explore the Bobover Hasidic sect nearby in Boro Park, Brooklyn, NY before venturing out into more isolated Hasidic communities throughout the United States. Shortly after his interactions with the Brooklyn, NY Hasidic communities, Robert travels to a kosher meat factory in St. Paul, Minnesota, where he witnesses cows being slaughtered.

After traveling across the United States and meeting with different Hasidim, Eisenberg travels abroad where he chronicles his experiences with Hasidic Grateful Dead fans in Antwerp, Belgium, dives into a Hasidic festival for Rosh Hashana in Uman, Ukraine, and concludes his travels on a Hasidic farm in Israel.

== Reception ==
Described as "insightful and often very funny," by the Los Angeles Times Book Review, Boychiks was embraced by both popular publications as well as Jewish publications. New York Times Book Review stated that the memoir "evokes the energy and intensity of Orthodox Jewish communities beautifully....[as] a sympathetic travelogue...lively and absorbing”, and The Washington Post states "it benefits from author Robert Eisenberg's high energy level and his engaging personality." In 2010, New York magazine's David Edelstein described Eisenberg's memoir as an "excellent book about Hasidic life." Since its initial release, Boychiks in the Hood has been referenced in numerous scholarly books such as Catskill Culture: A Mountain Rat's Memories of the Great Jewish Resort Area, Postville U.S.A: Surviving Diversity in Small-Town America, and Words on Fire: The Unfinished Story of Yiddish.
