= The Life of Juanita Castro =

- Movie poster
- Directed by: Andy Warhol
- Written by: Ronald Tavel
- Starring: Marie Menken; Ultra Violet; Mercedes Ospina; Ronald Tavel
- Distributed by: Andy Warhol Films
- Release date: 1965
- Running time: 66 minutes
- Country: United States
- Language: English

The Life of Juanita Castro is a 1965 American underground film directed by Andy Warhol, filmed in March 1965 based on the absurdist theater play by Ronald Tavel by the same name.

== Plot ==
A playwright (Ronald Tavel) taunts a number of actresses into improvising a play on Fidel Castro and his family, at a time when the revolution was bringing back disquieting stories of executions and imprisonments and, particularly, virulent hatred and torture of homosexuals in Cuba.

Several of the play's male characters (Fidel Castro, Raúl Castro, and Che Guevara) are played by women. The actresses face a camera they believe is filming them, while in fact they are being filmed by another camera placed off to one side. At times they are directed by Tavel to perform pointless acts in unison.

== Reception ==
According to The New York Times drama reviewer Tom Vick, the film "rewrites history as a high-camp farce," poking fun at machismo and totalitarianism.

== Cast ==
- Ronald Tavel as on-screen director
- Marie Menken as Juanita Castro
- Mercedes Ospina as Fidel Castro
- Elektrah (Lobel) as Raúl Castro
- Aniram Anipso as Che Guevara
- and as members of the Castro family: Harvey Tavel, Waldo Diaz-Balart, Ultra Violet, Jinny Bern, Amanda Sherrill, Bonny Gaer, Isadora Rose, Elizabeth Staal, and Carol Lobravico

== See also ==
- List of American films of 1965
- Andy Warhol filmography
