= Fred Herko =

American artist, musician, actor, dancer, choreographer and teacher

- Born: Frederick Charles Herko; February 23, 1936; New York City, U.S.
- Died: October 27, 1964 (aged 28); New York City, U.S.
- Other names: Freddie Herko; Freddy Herko
- Education: Juilliard School; American Ballet Theatre School
- Occupations: Ballet dancer, choreographer, actor

Frederick Charles "Freddie" Herko (February 23, 1936 – October 27, 1964) was an American artist, musician, actor, dancer, choreographer and teacher.

== Early life ==
Born in New York City, Herko's father was a diner manager and his mother was a homemaker. The family first lived on the Lower East Side, then moved to Brooklyn. When Herko was age 2, the family settled in Ossining, New York. As a child, Herko exhibited a talent for music and became a proficient pianist and flautist. Upon graduating from high school, Herko attended the Juilliard School and planned to be a concert pianist. In 1954, Herko attended a staging of Giselle and became fascinated with the Russian lead Igor Youskevitch. Herko soon decided to pursue a career as a ballet dancer. When Herko told his parents of his decision, his “macho, working-class” father became enraged and beat him.

== Career ==
Herko soon earned a four-year scholarship to the American Ballet Theatre School (now known as the Jacqueline Kennedy Onassis School). He studied classical ballet under Valentina Pereyaslavec and took additional dance classes with Merce Cunningham and James Waring. In the late 1950s, he was a regular member of James Waring's dance company and danced with Katherine Litz and Aileen Passloff. He was a member of the Judson Dance Theater, contributing two pieces to the group's inaugural concert on July 6, 1962. He performed in Frank O'Hara's Love's Labor and several of Andy Warhol's early films, including Haircut (No. 1), Kiss, The Thirteen Most Beautiful Boys, and Rollerskate (also known as Dance Movie).

Herko was associated with a group of habitués to Warhol's Silver Factory on 47th Street including Ondine, Rotten Rita, and Billy Name. Nicknamed "mole people" on account of their intensive speed usage and subterranean habits — "mole because they were known to be tunneling towards some greater insanity that no one but this inner circle was aware of" — members of this group performed their manias and drug routines in a life/art blurring spectacle in crash pads and stages throughout the city. They are best remembered for their roles in many of Warhol's experimental films.

Herko was a close friend of Diane di Prima, who writes of him in her biography Recollections of my Life as a Woman. She met him in 1954 as he sat on a bench in the rain in Washington Square Park. He was "crying because autumn always made him sad." Later he told di Prima that "He needed speed to push his body so he could dance the way he wanted to. He felt otherwise he didn't have a chance; he had come to dancing too late in life to make it work for him."

Di Prima describes Herko's elegiac performance For Sergio: "He arrived in black tights and a leotard, with a fierce archaic face mask painted on his face, and whispered to us to kill all the lights: house lights, stage lights, everything. I noticed he was in toe shoes. Then I stood silent, in awe of what was about to happen — something sacred and diabolical all at once. Freddie had an antique wall sconce with a mirror, the kind that used to hold a candle, and he lit the taper he had placed in it. And in that dark and suddenly silent theatre with his back to the audience, he began laboriously and slowly to go down one side aisle of the theatre, across the front below the proscenium, and up the other side. En pointe. The only music was the sound of his deliberately exaggerated and labored breathing. And the slow scraping of his toe shoes on the rough floor. The light, the flickering light of the candle reflected his painted face in the mirror in his hand...He was gone again before any of us could move."

== Death ==
By late 1964, Herko had begun behaving erratically due to an addiction to amphetamines and was homeless. He also suffered from pain in his ankles, impairing his ability to dance. Photographer and Factory regular Billy Name later said that he felt Herko became despondent over his inability to dance as well as he had before. He said “Freddie was a very demanding person about life. It had to be great.”

On October 27, 1964, Johnny Dodd saw Herko wildly dancing on the counter at Joe's Dinette in Greenwich Village. Dodd invited Herko to his apartment a few blocks away on Cornelia Street. Dodd later said Herko told him he hadn't taken any drugs for three days. According to Dodd, after arriving at his apartment, Herko went straight into his bathroom where he drew a bath, poured a bottle of Dodd's perfume into it and began to bathe. Meanwhile, Dodd had put on a record of Mozart's Coronation Mass. Herko emerged from the bath and went into the living room where he toweled off. He then began dancing naked, and according to Dodd, "occasionally making a run toward the windows." At the time, Dodd wondered whether this was going to be the "suicide performance" that Herko had been promising his friends during the weeks prior: "It was obvious that Freddy had to do it now: The time and the place were right, the decor was right, the music was right." As the music climaxed, Herko leapt through the open window landing five flights down below.

After Herko's death, Di Prima went to Deborah Lee's apartment where some of Herko's things were stored. "She and I went through it together. Black velvet was everywhere. Many shards of mirrors. Magick wands made out of old bedposts. Feathers. Lace. Broken statuary. Scraps of fabric, or carpet. Everything thick with some dark energy. There was one whole attaché case of male pornography carefully cut out of magazines as if for use in collage. On the floor in his room, there was a book by Mary Renault, open at the page where the king leaps into the sea, where the ritual to renew the world is described. It was the closest we found to a suicide note."

== Choreography ==
=== Original dances (incomplete list) ===
- Edge, Maidman Playhouse (March 5, 1962)
- Once or Twice a Week I Put on Sneakers To Go Uptown (July 6, 1962) at the first Judson Dance Theater Concert of Dance
- Cleanliness Event with Poo-Poo Cushion Music (June 10, 1963)
- Binghamton Birdie (June 23–24, 1963)
- Performance at 28 Bond Street (December 13–14, 1963)
- Dervish, Cordier & Ekstrom Gallery, New York (January 18, 1964)
- For Sergio [Sergio Gajardo] (March 5, 1964)
- The Palace of the Dragon Prince (May 1–2, 1964)

=== Performances (incomplete list) ===
- Love's Labor by Frank O'Hara
- All Day Dance by Deborah Hay, A Concert of Dance #7, Judson Church (June 24, 1963)
- Another Letter to the Sun (for Charles Ives) by Arlene Rothlein, A Concert of Dance #8, Judson Church (June 25, 1963)
- Fantastic Gardens by Elaine Summers (February 17–19, 1964)

== Filmography ==
- Jill and Freddy Dancing (1963)
- Dance Movie, also known as Rollerskate (1963)
- Haircut #1 (1963)
- Haircut #2 (1963)
- Kiss (1963)
- The Thirteen Most Beautiful Boys (1964)
