= James T. Sears =

American educator, historian, and activist

- Born: August 12, 1951 (age 75); Tipton, Indiana, U.S.
- Education: Southern Illinois University; Indiana University Bloomington; University of Wisconsin–Madison
- Occupation: Historian

James T. Sears (born August 12, 1951) is an American educator, historian, and activist. He is a former professor at the University of South Carolina, Trinity University, Harvard University, and Penn State. The author of books about LGBT history and sexuality education, his archive of correspondence, research notes, interviews (totaling 138 linear feet in 317 boxes) is located at the Rubenstein Library of Duke University with ancillary materials at the College of Charleston Special Collections.

== Early life ==
Sears was born on August 12, 1951, in Tipton, Indiana. He graduated from Southern Illinois University, where he earned a bachelor's degree majoring in history and government in 1974. He earned a master's degree in secondary education from Indiana University, followed by another master's degree in political science from the University of Wisconsin–Madison. His PhD, in 1984, from Indiana University Bloomington was a critical ethnography of that same university, where he earned his doctorate in sociology and curriculum studies—and later named Outstanding IU Alumni.

== Career ==
Sears began his career in higher education at Trinity University, in 1983, and then was appointed assistant professor at The University of South Carolina and was promoted to full professor in 1991. During his 20-year career at USC, Sears pursued twin writing tracks in sexuality education and LGBT studies establishing himself as "one of the preeminent scholars of southern gay culture" and earning the wrath of the Christian Right. In 1993, Southern Baptist Convention members joined other conservative religious groups across the country in condemning Sears for teaching a graduate course on the impact of Christian fundamentalism on education, earning him the moniker of "Satan of the University" and awarded South Carolina's American Civil Liberties Union First Amendment Award. In addition to organizing for LGBT rights on and off campus, Sears was the founding editor of two LGBT journals—Empathy (1988–1994) and the Journal of LGBT Youth (2003–present). He was also an early gay activist locally, co-founding the South Carolina Business Guild and giving a major gay rights speech on the steps of the capitol in 1993.

Sears was a visiting a visiting researcher at the University of Southern California,^{[1]} a visiting research fellow at the University of Queensland, a Research Lecturer at Brazil's National Council for Scientific and Technological Development, and a Fulbright Southeast Asian Scholar.

== Selected works ==
- Sears, James T. (1991). Growing Up Gay in the South: Race, Gender, and Journeys of the Spirit. New York: Haworth Press. ISBN 9780866569118. OCLC 21973766.
- Sears, James T.; Williams, Walter L., eds. (1997). Overcoming Heterosexism and Homophobia: Strategies That Work. New York City: Columbia University Press. ISBN 9780231104227. OCLC 36024057.
- Sears, James T., ed. (2005). Youth Education and Sexualities: An International Encyclopedia. Westport: Greenwood Press. ISBN 9781780341491. OCLC 749781670.
- Sears, James T. (2001). Rebels, Rubyfruit, and Rhinestones: Queering Space in the Stonewall South. New Brunswick, New Jersey: Rutgers University Press. ISBN 9780813532394. OCLC 65333824.
- Sears, James T. (2011). Behind the Mask of the Mattachine: The Hal Call Chronicles and the Early Movement for Homosexual Emancipation. New York: Routledge. ISBN 9780203057063. OCLC 1082198658.
- Sears, James T. (2024) Queering Rehoboth Beach: Beyond the Boardwalk. Philadelphia: Temple University Press. ISBN 978-1439923801
