= List of longest films =

Movies with a running time of 5 hours or more

This list of longest films is composed of films with a running time of 300 minutes (5 hours) or more.

== Cinematic films ==
Note: Some releases are extended cuts or director's cuts, and are ranked according to the longest verified running time.

Cinematic films
Title	Running time	Director	Year released	Notes
Resan (The Journey)	873 min (14 hr, 33 min)	Peter Watkins	1987	
Exergue – on documenta 14	848 min (14 hr, 8 min)	Dimitris Athiridis	2024	
La flor	803 min (13 hr, 23 min)	Mariano Llinás	2018	
Out 1 (Noli me tangere)	775 min (12 hr, 55 min)	Jacques Rivette	1971	
Evolution of a Filipino Family	624 min (10 hr, 24 min)	Lav Diaz	2004	
Ulysses	586 min (9 hr, 46 min)	Nikita Lavretski	2024	
Shoah	566 min (9 hr, 26 min)	Claude Lanzmann	1985	
Tie Xi Qu: West of the Tracks	551 min (9 hr, 11 min)	Wang Bing	2003	
Death in the Land of Encantos	540 min (9 hr)	Lav Diaz	2007	
Fubei Park	540 min (9 hr)	Chiang Wei Liang	2026	
Heremias	519 min (8 hr, 39 min)	Lav Diaz	2006	
Taiga	501 min (8 hr, 21 min)	Ulrike Ottinger	1992	
Dead Souls	495 min (8 hr, 15 min)	Wang Bing	2018	
A Lullaby to the Sorrowful Mystery	485 min (8 hr, 5 min)	Lav Diaz	2016	
The Works and Days	480 min (8 hr)	C.W. Winter; Anders Edström	2020	
O.J.: Made in America	463 min (7 hr, 43 min)	Ezra Edelman	2016	
Melancholia	450 min (7 hr, 30 min)	Lav Diaz	2008	
Three Mirrors Creature's Flashes of Flesh	442 min (7 hr, 22 min)	Giuliano Tomassacci	2023	
CzechMate: In Search of Jiří Menzel	448 min (7 hr, 28 min)	Shivendra Singh Dungarpur	2018	
Sátántangó	439 min (7 hr, 19 min)	Béla Tarr	1994	
A Tale of Filipino Violence	434 min (7 hr, 14 min)	Lav Diaz	2022	
Napoléon	425 min (7 hr, 5 min)	Abel Gance	1927 (Restoration, 2024)	
La Roue	413 min (6 hr, 53 min)	Abel Gance	1923 (Restoration, 2019)	
Minamata Mandala	372 min (6 hr, 12 min)	Kazuo Hara	2020	
Florentina Hubaldo, CTE	367 min (6 hr, 7 min)	Lav Diaz	2012	
The Best of Youth	366 min (6 hr, 6 min)	Marco Tullio Giordana	2003	
Century of Birthing	360 min (6 hr)	Lav Diaz	2011	
Near Death	358 min (5 hr, 58 min)	Frederick Wiseman	1989	
Karamay	356 min (5 hr, 56 min)	Xu Xin	2011	
DAU. Degeneration	355 min (5 hr, 55 min)	Ilya Khrzhanovsky; Ilya Permyakov	2020	
Little Dorrit	350 min (5 hr, 50 min)	Christine Edzard	1987	
La Commune (Paris, 1871)	345 min (5 hr, 45 min)	Peter Watkins	2000	
Carlos	339 min (5 hr, 39 min)	Olivier Assayas	2010	
From What Is Before	338 min (5 hr, 38 min)	Lav Diaz	2014	
My Undesirable Friends: Part I — Last Air in Moscow	324 min (5 hr, 24 min)	Julia Loktev	2024	
Happy Hour	317 min (5 hr, 17 min)	Ryusuke Hamaguchi	2015	
Novecento (1900)	317 min (5 hr, 17 min)	Bernardo Bertolucci	1976	
Ugryum-River	316 min (5 hr, 16 min)	Yaropolk Lapshin	1969	
Batang West Side	315 min (5 hr, 15 min)	Lav Diaz	2001	
The Deluge	315 min (5 hr, 15 min)	Jerzy Hoffman	1974	
Fanny and Alexander	314 min (5 hr, 14 min)	Ingmar Bergman	1982	
Tsahal	304 min (5 hr, 4 min)	Claude Lanzmann	1994	

== Experimental films ==
While most cinematic films have a broad theatrical release in multiple locations through normal distribution channels, some of the longest films are experimental in nature or created for art gallery installations, having never been simultaneously released to multiple screens or intended for mainstream audiences. They may have been shown in venues where audiences were only expected to view a portion of the film during its screening.

Experimental films
Title	Running time	Director	Year released	Notes
Logistics	51,420 min (857 hr / 35 days, 17 hours)	Erika Magnusson; Daniel Andersson	2012	
Modern Times Forever	14,400 min (240 hr / 10 days)	Superflex	2011	
Beijing 2003	9,000 min (150 hr / 6 days, 6 hours)	Ai Weiwei	2004	
Cinématon	9,000 min (150 hr / 6 days, 6 hours)	Gérard Courant	2009	
Untitled #125 (Hickory)	7,200 min (120 hr / 5 days)	Josh Azzarella	2011	
Matrjoschka	5,700 min (95 hr / 3 days, 23 hours)	Karin Hoerler	2006	
The Cure for Insomnia	5,220 min (87 hr / 3 days, 15 hours)	John Henry Timmis IV	1987	
Eniaios	4,800 min (80 hr / 3 days, 8 hours)	Gregory Markopoulos	2004 (ongoing)	
The Longest Most Meaningless Movie in the World	2,880 min (48 hr / 2 days)	Vincent Patouillard	1968	
**** (Four Stars)	1,500 min (25 hr / 1 day, 1 hour)	Andy Warhol	1967	
24 Hour Psycho	1,440 min (24 hr / 1 day)	Douglas Gordon	1993	
The Clock	1,440 min (24 hr / 1 day)	Christian Marclay	2010	
24 Hours of Happy	1,440 min (24 hr / 1 day)	Yoann Lemoine	2013	
My Human Time	1,440 min (24 hr / 1 day)	Marc Sallent	2014	
15 Hours	900 min (15 hr)	Wang Bing	2017	
Crude Oil	840 min (14 hr)	Wang Bing	2008	
Bordeax Piece	823 min (13 hr, 43 min)	David Claerbout	2004	
Non c’è Nessuna Dark Side (atto uno, parte due) _ L’Orizzonte degli Eventi	798 min (13 hr, 18 min)	Erik Negro	2024	
The White House	690 min (11 hr, 30 min)	David Claerbout	2006	
Circus Savage	643 min (10 hr, 43 min)	Larry Jordan	2009	
Paint Drying	607 min (10 hr, 7 min)	Charlie Shackleton	2016	
Empire	485 min (8 hr, 5 min)	Andy Warhol	1965	
Baa Baa Land	480 min (8 hr)	Garth Thomas	2017	
Imitation of Christ	480 min (8 hr)	Andy Warhol	1967	
Park Lanes	480 min (8 hr)	Kevin Jerome Everson	2015	
Sleep	480 min (8 hr)	Lilja Juha	2013	
The Wake	462 min (7 hr, 42 min)	Michael Kvium; Christian Lemmerz	2000	
Hitler: A Film from Germany	442 min (7 hr, 23 min)	Hans-Jürgen Syberberg	1977	
Lamentations: A Monument to the Dead World	435 min (7 hr, 15 min)	R. Bruce Elder	1985	
The Movie Orgy	420 min (7 hr)	Joe Dante	1968	
Rejected	420 min (7 hr)	William E. Jones	2017	
Star Spangled to Death	402 min (6 hr, 42 min)	Ken Jacobs	2004	
Babel	380 min (6 hr, 20 min)	Boris Lehman	1991	
A Lot of Sorrow	369 min (6 hr, 9 min)	Ragnar Kjartansson	2013	
River of Fundament	352 min (5 hr, 52 min); Including two 20-minute intermissions	Matthew Barney	2014	
Sleep	321 min (5 hr, 21 min)	Andy Warhol	1964	

== Films released in separate parts ==
This section lists films conceived as an artistic unity and produced simultaneously, or consecutively with no significant interruption or change of production team, even though they were released with separate premieres.

Films released in separate parts
Title	Running time	Director	Year released	Parts	Average runtime	Notes
The Burning of the Red Lotus Temple	1,620 min (27 hr)	Zhang Shichuan	1928–31	16	101 min (1 hr, 41 min)	
Die Zweite Heimat	1,509 min (25 hr, 9 min)	Edgar Reitz	1992	13	116 min (1 hr, 56 min)	
Amra Ekta Cinema Banabo (The Innocence)	1,260 min (21 hr)	Ashraf Shishir	2019	8	158 min (2 hr, 38 min)	
Berlin Alexanderplatz	931 min (15 hr, 31 min)	Rainer Werner Fassbinder	1980	14	72 min (1 hr, 12 min)	
Heimat	924 min (15 hr, 24 min)	Edgar Reitz	1984	11	84 min (1 hr, 24 min)	
A Dream of Red Mansions	735 min (12 hr, 15 min)	Xie Tieli; Zhao Yuan	1988–89	6	123 min (2 hr, 3 min)	
Castration Movie	701 min (11 hr, 41 min)	Louise Weard	2024-26	3	233 min (3 hr, 53 min)	
Heimat 3	680 min (11 hr, 33 min)	Edgar Reitz	2003	6	113 min (1 hr, 53 min)	
The Lord of the Rings Trilogy (Extended cut)	683 min (11 hr, 23 min)	Peter Jackson	2001–03	3	228 min (3 hr, 48 min)	
Soldiers of Freedom	599 min (9 hr, 59 min)	Yuri Ozerov	1977	4	150 min (2 hr, 30 min)	
The Human Condition	574 min (9 hr, 34 min)	Masaki Kobayashi	1959–61	3	191 min (3 hr, 11 min)	
Dekalog	572 min (9 hr, 32 min)	Krzysztof Kieślowski	1988–89	10	57 min	
Men and War	563 min (9 hr, 23 min)	Satsuo Yamamoto	1970–73	3	188 min (3 hr, 8 min)	
Digimon Adventure tri.	536 min (8 hr, 56 min)	Keitaro Motonaga	2015–18	6	89 min (1 hr, 29 min)	
The Hobbit Trilogy (Extended cut)	532 min (8 hr, 52 min)	Peter Jackson	2012–14	3	177 min (2 hr, 57 min)	
Barrabas	506 min (8 hr, 26 min)	Louis Feuillade	1920	12	42 min	
The Photo-Drama of Creation	480 min (8 hr)	Charles Taze Russell	1914	4	120 min (2 hr)	
Liberation	445 min (7 hr, 25 min)	Yuri Ozerov	1968–71	5	89 min (1 hr, 29 min)	
Dhurandhar + Dhurandhar: The Revenge	441 min (7 hr, 21 min)	Aditya Dhar	2025-26	2	220 min (3 hr, 40 min)	
Sangokushi [ja]	436 min (7 hr, 16 min)	Masaharu Okuwaki	1992–94	3	145 min (2 hr, 25 min)	
War and Peace	431 min (7 hr, 11 min)	Sergei Bondarchuk	1966–67	4	104 min (1 hr, 44 min)	
Les Vampires	421 min (7 hr, 1 min)	Louis Feuillade	1915–16	10	42 min	
Tih Minh	418 min (6 hr, 58 min)	Louis Feuillade	1918	12	35 min	
The Emigrants + The New Land	393 min (6 hr, 33 min)	Jan Troell	1971–72	2	197 min (3 hr, 17 min)	
Avatar: The Way of Water + Fire and Ash	389 min (6 hr, 29 min)	James Cameron	2022–25	2	195 min (3 hr, 15 min)	
Arabian Nights	383 min (6 hr, 23 min)	Miguel Gomes	2015	3	128 min (2 hr, 8 min)	
Border	382 mins (6 hr, 22 min)	J. P. Dutta (Part 1); Anurag Singh (Part 2)	1997-2026	2	191 min (3 hr, 11 min)	
Rebel Moon (Director's Cut)	374 min (6 hr, 14 min)	Zack Snyder	2023–24 (2024 director's cut)	2	204 min (3 hr, 24 min)	
La Révolution française	360 min (6 hr)	Robert Enrico (Part 1); Richard T. Heffron (Part 2)	1989	2	180 min (3 hr)	
Battle of Moscow	358 min (5 hr, 58 min)	Yuri Ozerov	1985	2	179 min (2 hr, 59 min)	
Little Dorrit	357 min (5 hr, 57 min)	Christine Edzard	1987	2	179 min (2 hr, 59 min)	
Fantômas	337 min (5 hr, 37 min)	Louis Feuillade	1913	5	67 min (1 hr, 7 min)	
Joan the Maid	336 min (5 hr, 36 min)	Jacques Rivette	1994	2	168 min (2 hr, 48 min)	
Ponniyin Selvan	332 min (5 hr, 32 min)	Mani Ratnam	2021–22	2	166 min (2 hr, 46 min)	
Avengers: Infinity War + Endgame	330 min (5 hr, 30 min)	Anthony Russo; Joe Russo	2018–19	2	165 min (2 hr, 45 min)	
And Quiet Flows the Don	330 min (5 hr, 30 min)	Sergei Gerasimov	1957	3	110 min (1 hr, 50 min)	
Fear Street	328 min (5 hr, 28 min)	Leigh Janiak	2021	3	109 min (1 hr, 49 min)	
Baahubali	330 min (5 hr, 30 min)	S. S. Rajamouli	2015–17	2	165 min (2 hr, 45 min)	
Nymphomaniac (uncut)	325 min (5 hr, 25 min)	Lars von Trier	2013	2	163 min (2 hr, 43 min)	
Aszparuh (uncut)	323 min (5 hr, 23 min)	Ludmil Staikov	1981	3	108 min (1 hr, 48 min)	
Pirates of the Caribbean: Dead Man's Chest + At World's End	319 min (5 hr, 19 min)	Gore Verbinski	2006–07	2	160 min (2 hr, 40 min)	
Gangs of Wasseypur	317 min (5 hr, 17 min)	Anurag Kashyap	2012	2	159 min (2 hr, 39 min)	
Samurai Trilogy	303 min (5 hr, 3 min)	Hiroshi Inagaki	1954–56	3	101 min (1 hr, 41 min)	
Judex	300 min (5 hr)	Louis Feuillade	1916	13	23 min	

== See also ==
- National Film Registry
- Slow cinema
- Marathon
- Back-to-back film production
- List of films with longest production time
- List of longest films in India
- List of longest animated films
