= Bytox (medication) =

Bytox Hangover Patch
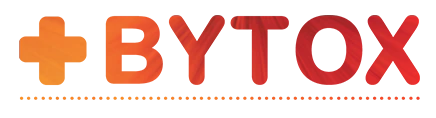
- Product type: Hangover patch
- Current owner: Alex Shvarts
- Produced by: Bytox
- Country: United States
- Introduced: 2011; 15 years ago
- Previous owners: Alex Fleyshmakher; Leonard Grossman
- Website: bytox.com

Bytox Hangover Patch is a vitamin-infused transdermal patch used to reduce effects of hangover.

== History ==
Bytox Hangover Patch was first introduced in 2011 in New York by Leonard Grossman, a plastic and reconstructive surgeon, and Alex Fleyshmakher, a mobile phone retailer. According to Grossman, the idea originated when Fleyshmakher visited his medical office seeking relief from a hangover and was administered an intravenous B-complex vitamin solution; observing the rapid reduction of his symptoms, the two co-founders began exploring ways to deliver a similar nutrient blend through a transdermal patch rather than via pills or liquids, which they considered ineffective due to alcohol's interference with digestive absorption. The name Bytox is a portmanteau of the words "bye" and "toxins".

The patch was launched in New York in late 2011 and became available in the United Kingdom shortly afterwards, distributed by online retailer Firebox. In 2012, the patch was withdrawn from sale in the United Kingdom by the Medicines and Healthcare products Regulatory Agency (MHRA) because it lacked the required license.

Bytox was subsequently acquired by Alex Shvarts, an American business executive and the chief executive of the fintech firm FundKite, who became the company's owner. By the early 2020s, Bytox had expanded distribution through retailers such as Urban Outfitters, Anthropologie, Free People, BevMo! and the rapid-delivery service Gopuff, and had introduced complementary product lines including an immune-booster patch and a collagen patch.

== Product ==
Bytox works in the same way as scopolamine does. It is made using acai berries and extract of green tea.
