= Film Culture =

American film magazine (1955–1996)

- Categories: Film
- Founder: Adolfas Mekas and Jonas Mekas
- Founded: 1954
- First issue: 1955
- Final issue: 1996
- Country: United States
- Based in: New York City
- Language: English
- ISSN: 0015-1211

Film Culture was an American film magazine founded in 1954 by Adolfas Mekas and his brother Jonas Mekas. It championed independent, experimental and avant-garde cinema, and served as a forum for the New American Cinema movement. The first issue appeared in 1955; the magazine ceased operations in 1996.

== History ==
Headquartered in New York City, Film Culture quickly became known for its advocacy of experimental cinema. In the third issue, Jonas Mekas contributed an essay, "The Experimental Film in America", that criticized the "adolescent" character of American avant-garde culture and argued that "there was an empty gap between Hollywood's populism and the self-absorption of experimental filmmaking". He later distanced himself from this essay, which had homophobic overtones, as a "Saint-Augustine-before-the-conversion piece" since he became a supporter of many of the filmmakers he had previously criticized.

In addition to offering traditional content like reviews of new films and film books, interviews with motion picture artists, and accounts of film festivals, the magazine published influential essays in film theory. Andrew Sarris's "Notes on the Auteur Theory in 1962" introduced American readers to the notion, developed by French critics in the journal Cahiers du Cinéma, that directors "author" their films and put their unique stamp on them. The following year Film Culture featured a lengthier essay by Sarris, "The American Cinema", which applied auteur theory when ranking and categorizing over 150 directors.

An entire 1963 issue was devoted to "Metaphors on Vision", a treatise by Stan Brakhage on non-narrative filmmaking and visual experience in avant-garde cinema. That same year, Film Culture printed transcript excerpts from a 1953 symposium, "Poetry and the Film", with a panel including Maya Deren, Parker Tyler, Dylan Thomas, Arthur Miller, and Willard Maas; the participants discussed the aesthetic intersections of poetry, mythology, and cinematic form. P. Adams Sitney's 1969 essay "Structural Film" coined the term and helped define the movement.

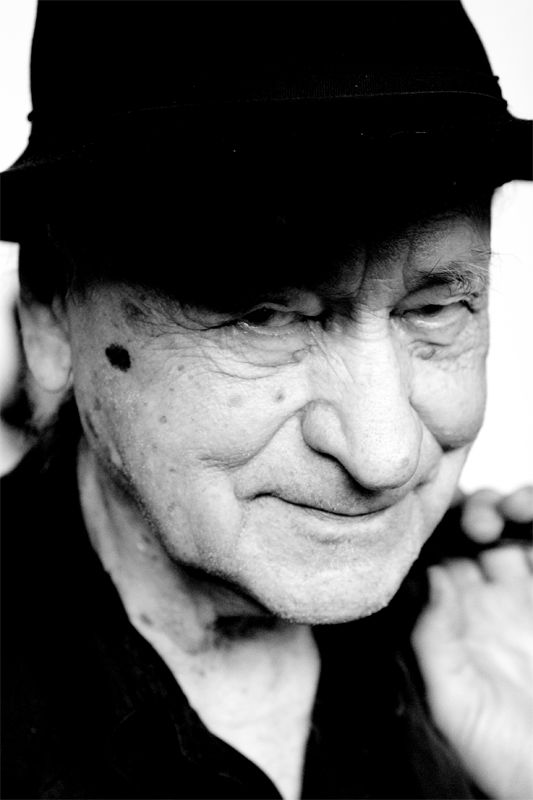
Jonas Mekas

In 1961, Jonas Mekas co-founded The Film-Makers' Cooperative and used the pages of Film Culture to publicize the new organization (the Cooperative's catalog of films was listed in a 1965 issue). In summer of 1961, the magazine printed a manifesto, principally drafted by Mekas, titled "The First Statement of the New American Cinema Group". It announced that a new generation of independent filmmakers was seeking ways to finance and distribute their work, and break the stranglehold of the "official cinema" establishment. P. Adams Sitney would later write that Film Culture, which branded itself "America's Independent Motion Picture Magazine", had become by early 1964 "the quasiofficial magazine of the avant-garde filmmaker".

In 1970, Sitney selected essays from Film Culture for an anthology called Film Culture Reader. Cooper Square Press reissued the anthology in 2000.

Film Culture ceased publication in 1996. During its existence, the magazine produced 79 issues.

== Film awards ==
The magazine presented awards to independent filmmakers:

- First Independent Film Award: John Cassavetes for Shadows (1959)
- Second Independent Film Award: Robert Frank and Alfred Leslie for Pull My Daisy (1960)
- Third Independent Film Award: Ricky Leacock, Don Pennebaker, Robert Drew and Al Maysles for Primary (1961)
- Fourth Independent Film Award: Stan Brakhage for The Dead and Prelude (1962)
- Fifth Independent Film Award: Jack Smith for Flaming Creatures (1963)
- Sixth Independent Film Award: Andy Warhol for Sleep, Haircut, Eat, Kiss and Empire (1964)
- Seventh Independent Film Award: Harry Smith for his entire body of work (1965)
- Eighth Independent Film Award: Gregory Markopoulos for his entire body of work (1966)
- Ninth Independent Film Award: Michael Snow for Wavelength (1968)
- Tenth Independent Film Award: Kenneth Anger for Invocation of My Demon Brother (1969)

== See also ==
- Cinephilia
- New American Cinema
- List of American independent films
