= Tamara Levitt =

Canadian voice actor, writer, and businessperson

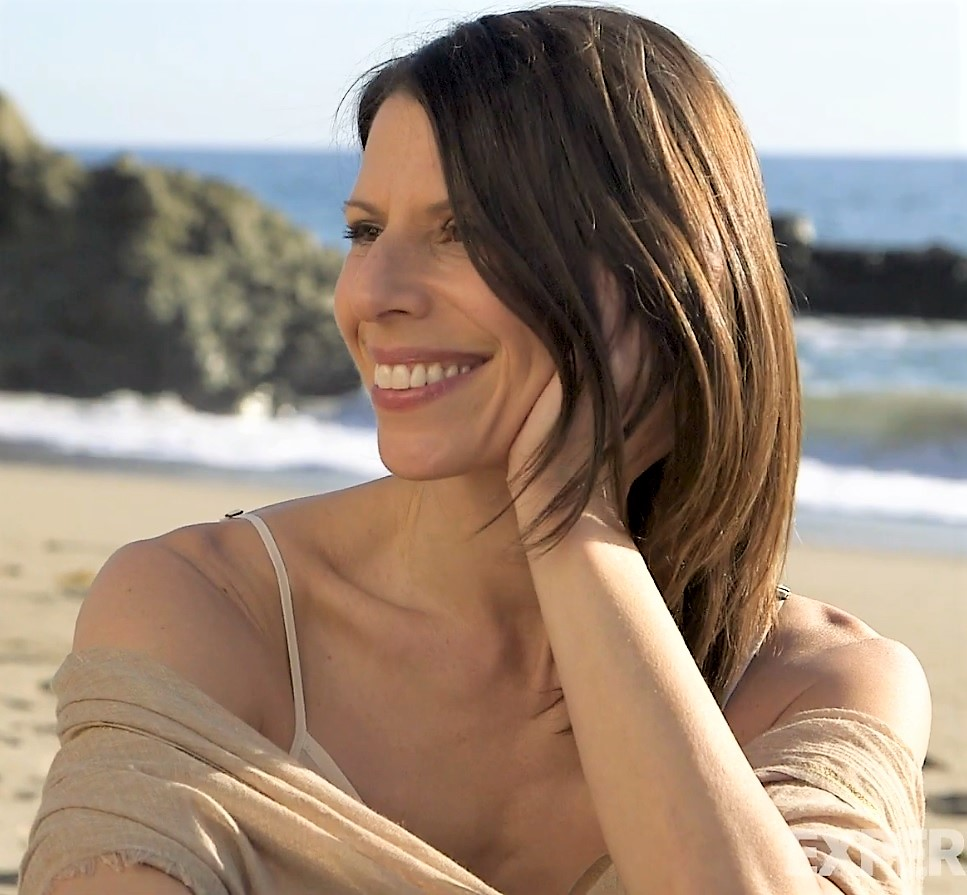
- Levitt in photoshoot for Experience Life magazine in 2019
- Born: December 2, 1971 (age 54)
- Known for: Narrator of the Calm app

Tamara Levitt (born December 2, 1971) is a Canadian author, mindfulness instructor, and voice-over artist most widely known as the narrator for the Calm app.

== Biography ==
Levitt had a difficult relationship with her father growing up. At an early age, she began singing and writing music, which helped her manage her feelings towards her father. Around age 12, she began a professional stage career, singing and acting. However, by the time she was 14, she had developed anxiety, depression and an eating disorder, and described herself as "an angry punk rocker" whose childhood "wasn't an easy one".

When she was 18, she discovered the benefits of meditation at an eight-week mindfulness and meditation course at an eating disorders centre in Toronto.

== Career ==
Levitt continued working as a musician and a voice-over actress until she gave up both in her mid-20s, because of the pressure she put herself under.

She began developing meditation and mindfulness sessions for corporations, together with short films, television productions, and books on mindfulness. Her 2017 children's book, The Secret to Clara's Calm, was reviewed by Kirkus, who said "Clara may just be too calm."

In 2014, Levitt reached out via e-mail with a résumé to Calm's co-founders, Alex Tew and Michael Acton Smith. She has held the title of Head of Mindfulness at the app since November 2014 and has undisclosed equity in the company. As the Head of Mindfulness, Levitt leads the creative development of content on Calm. "The Daily Calm" is the app's most popular feature, which Levitt writes and then records her narration in a studio in Toronto. According to The New York Times, as of July 2019 she had written and recorded "hundreds" of meditations. That same month CTV news said she was "responsible for the daily meditation practice of more than two million people."

In Levitt's first four years at Calm, subscriptions grew from 2,500 subscribers to one million. Fans of Levitt have described her voice as "marvelous", "hypnotic", and "somehow magic". One stated that if she were to start recording commercials, that they would "probably end up buying three insurance policies and a Snuggie before snapping out of it".

== Personal life ==
Levitt lives in Toronto.

== Bibliography ==
- Happiness Doesn't Come from Headstands, ISBN 1614294054, 2013
- The Secret to Clara's Calm, ISBN 1614293902, 2017
