= Calm (company) =

American wellness software company

Calm.com, Inc.
- Type: Private
- Founded: May 4, 2012; 14 years ago
- Founders: Michael Acton Smith; Alex Tew
- Headquarters: San Francisco, California, United States
- Area served: Worldwide
- Products: App; Website; Book
- Number of employees: 310 (2022)
- Website: calm.com

Calm.com, Inc., doing business as Calm, is an American software company based in San Francisco, California. Founded in 2012, the company develops digital wellness products focused on meditation, sleep, and mental health.

== History ==
Calm was founded on May 4, 2012, by Michael Acton Smith and Alex Tew. The concept for Calm originated from an earlier project created by co-founder Alex Tew in 2011, titled "Do Nothing for 2 Minutes", a web-based experience that demonstrated a demand for digital mindfulness tools.The website was developed by Tew and Ben Dowling, cofounder of Geomium and later Calm's first CTO.

Tamara Levitt became the Head of Mindfulness in November 2014 and is one of the app's primary narrators.

The company generated $22 million in revenue in 2017 and reached an annual revenue run rate of $75 million. As of 2017, Calm had raised $1.5M in angel investments. Calm was Apple's "App of the Year" in 2017, and was ranked by Inc. as one of the fastest-growing private companies in America in 2018.

As of February 2019, the company was valued at $1 billion and had raised $116 million, with contributions from existing investors, including Insight Venture Partners, Ashton Kutcher's Sound Ventures, and Creative Artists Agency.

In February 2022, Calm acquired Ripple Health Group, a technology company that connects users with proper healthcare options. The acquisition focused on building Calm Health, which was released in October 2022 and offered through traditional healthcare providers, payers, and self-insured employers. It was initially offered to patients suffering from anxiety or depression. The company planned to add mental health programs for those with other physical conditions.

In November 2022, Calm had four million paid subscribers.

== Product ==
Calm produces meditation products, including guided meditations, a book, narrated Sleep Stories, and health and meditation videos. Their primary product is the meditation app, available on iPhone and Android devices.

=== Meditation app ===
The meditation area offers breathing exercises, a daily meditation, several multi-day programs, and unguided and guided meditation sessions.

==== Soundscapes, music, exclusive albums ====
The app also hosts Alanis Morissette's 2022 ambient album The Storm Before the Calm.

Jay Shetty, the company's chief purpose officer, hosts a short mindfulness message called "The Daily Jay."

==== "Sleep Stories" series ====
On December 1, 2016, Calm launched an initial range of 23 Sleep Stories, with the aim of helping adult listeners sleep.

Sleep Stories include archival recordings of Bob Ross, classical and ambient music including compositions by Johannes Brahms, Sigur Rós, deadmau5, and Moby. The series also included original stories and public domain fiction read by narrators.

In 2018, singer Leona Lewis contributed narration to the sleep stories in support of (RED)'s Global Fund to end AIDS.

In December 2023, Calm announced that it had used AI voice-cloning technology to create a Christmas-themed original story "It's a Wonderful Sleep Story" narrated by American actor James Stewart, 25 years after the actor's death in 1997.

=== Calm Health ===
Calm Health is the company's clinically oriented platform, which launched in 2022, and offers condition-specific mental health programs and integrates with healthcare providers and employers to support patients with anxiety, depression, and other health-related behavioral needs.

== Media ==
The company produced a nature documentary series for HBO Max.

== Publications ==
- Calm: Calm the Mind. Change the World (Penguin, 2015), Michael Acton Smith, ISBN 978-0241201954

== See also ==
- Baa Baa Land
