= Baa Baa Land =

- Directed by: Garth Thomas
- Screenplay by: Peter Freedman
- Produced by: Peter Freedman, Michael Acton Smith, Alex Tew
- Edited by: Garth Thomas
- Production company: Calm
- Release date: September 27, 2017
- Running time: 480 minutes
- Country: United Kingdom

Baa Baa Land is a 2017 slow cinema film produced by meditation software company Calm featuring eight hours of footage of sheep standing in a field. The idea for the film was conceived by producer Peter Freedman, and was directed, shot and edited by art film director Garth Thomas. Each shot lasts between 30 minutes to over an hour. It was filmed at the Layer Marney lamb and sheep farm near Tiptree in Essex, England, and premiered at the Prince Charles Cinema in London's West End on September 27, 2017.

The film is an example of "slow cinema", a technique that focuses on long takes, minimalism, and often very little to no narrative or dialogue. The film has no plot nor any human actors, dialogue or narrative, and was described as the "dullest movie ever made" by Freedman. It is intended to put viewers to sleep, and was described by producer Alex Tew, a co-founder of Calm along with producer Michael Acton Smith, as "better than any sleeping pill" and "the ultimate insomnia cure".

Baa Baa Land's length of eight hours has led some to call it the nineteenth longest film of all time, the same length as Andy Warhol's 1967 film The Imitation of Christ and five minutes shorter than Empire.
