= Modern Times Forever (Stora Enso Building, Helsinki) =

2011 film by Danish artists' group Superflex

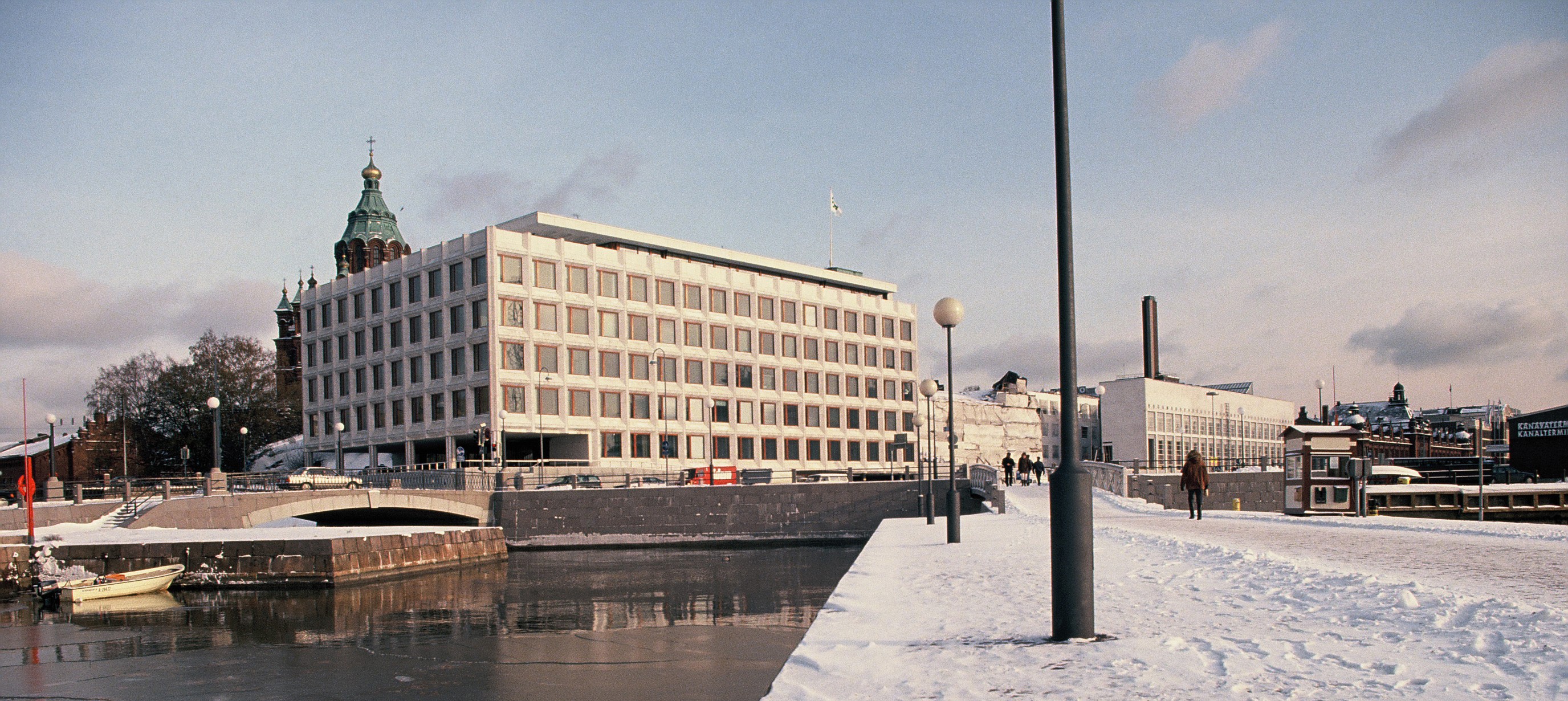
- The Stora Enso building
- Directed by: Bjornstjerne Reuter Christiansen; Jakob Fenger; Rasmus Nielsen; Superflex
- Release date: March 23, 2011
- Running time: 14,400 minutes
- Countries: Denmark, Finland, Vietnam
- Language: Danish

Modern Times Forever (Stora Enso Building, Helsinki) is a 2011 film by Danish artists' group Superflex. It is currently the second-longest film ever made, lasting 240 hours (10 days). The film shows how Helsinki's Stora Enso headquarters building would decay over the next few millennia. The film was originally projected against the building itself.

== See also ==
- Logistics (film)
