= Firebox =

Firebox may refer to:

- Firebox (steam engine), the area where the fuel is burned in a steam engine
- Firebox (architecture), the part of a fireplace where fuel is combusted
- Firebox Records, a Finnish record label
- Firebox.com, an electronic commerce company based in the UK.
- Fire alarm box, an outdoor device used for notifying a fire department of a fire
- Firebox (song), a song by Europe from the album Bag of Bones
- Firebox, a miniaturized Linux PC for encrypted text and voice messaging, developed by the CryptoRights Foundation in 2004 as part of its HighFire communications security project
