= My Human Time =

- Directed by: Marc Sallent
- Release date: 5 September 2014
- Running time: 1440 minutes (24 hours, 8 seconds)
- Country: Spain
- Language: English

My Human Time is the title of a 24-hour promotional film, created for the now-defunct startup Audiosnaps. The film was recorded in one continuous take, making it the longest advertisement ever filmed in a single shot. Throughout the entire 24 hours, Marc Sallent appears sitting in front of the camera, speaking only to announce the time every minute.

== See also ==
- List of longest films
