= Matrjoschka =

- Directed by: Karin Hoerler
- Produced by: Karin Hoerler
- Edited by: Karin Hoerler
- Release date: 23 April 2006
- Running time: 5700 minutes (95 hours)
- Country: Germany
- Language: no sound

Matrjoschka ("Matryoshka") is a film made and produced by the German artist Karin Hoerler in 2006. At ninety-five hours, it is one of the longest experimental films by time.

The film consists of images and sequences based on a single photo. It shows a boy riding a bicycle, a street, houses, garages, and sky. Over time, the image changes, but those movements are very slow and not directly visible.

The world premiere of the film was at the light spectacle Luminale 2006 in Frankfurt-Germany. Matrjoschka was publicly shown on an outdoor 100 m^{2} LED-screen at the DrKW-building, starting on 23 April 2006 at 6:00am and ending on 28 April 2006 at 1:00am. During the night, there was a break from 1:00 to 6:00am.

This film is available only in Windows Media Video format on DVD.

The movie is 4 days long and took over 10 years to make.

== See also ==
- List of longest films
