= Beijing 2003 =

2004 film by Ai Weiwei

- A frame from the film, as seen in Beijing 10/2003
- Directed by: Ai Weiwei
- Produced by: Ai Weiwei
- Release date: 2004
- Running time: 9,000 minutes
- Country: China

Beijing 2003 is a 2004 experimental documentary film by Chinese contemporary artist and filmmaker Ai Weiwei. The film consists of continuous street-level footage recorded throughout Beijing and is notable for its extreme duration and conceptual approach to urban documentation. At 9,000 minutes (150 hours), it is one of the longest films of all time.

== Content ==
The film contains no conventional narrative, dialogue, or soundtrack. It consists solely of long, uninterrupted shots of Beijing's streets, buildings, traffic, and pedestrians as observed from the moving vehicle. The work aligns with traditions of structural film, and durational cinema, emphasizing time, repetition, and observation over storytelling.

== Production ==
Beijing 2003 was filmed over a period of sixteen days beginning on October 18, 2003. Using a camera mounted inside a moving vehicle, the project recorded every street within Beijing's Fourth Ring Road. The resulting footage totals more than 150 hours, presenting an unedited traversal of the city's road network.

The project was conceived during a period of rapid urban transformation in Beijing and reflects Ai Weiwei's interest in surveillance, infrastructure, and the everyday experience of contemporary Chinese cities.

A book was also published in 2004 titled Beijing 10/2003, which contains 1,760 stills from the film.

== Reception ==
Beijing 2003 has been screened primarily in art and experimental film contexts rather than through commercial distribution. It was shown as part of a curated program at the International Film Festival Rotterdam, where it was presented within a retrospective framework highlighting overlooked or durational works.
