= Sleep (1964 film) =

American underground film by Andy Warhol

- Directed by: Andy Warhol
- Produced by: Andy Warhol
- Starring: John Giorno
- Cinematography: Andy Warhol
- Edited by: Andy Warhol
- Release date: January 17, 1964
- Running time: 321 minutes
- Country: United States
- Language: Silent

Sleep is a 1964 American underground film by Andy Warhol. Lasting five hours and 21 minutes, it consists of looped footage of John Giorno, Warhol's lover at the time, sleeping.

The film was one of Warhol's first experiments with filmmaking, and was created as an "anti-film". Warhol would later extend this technique to his eight-hour-long film Empire (1965).

== Synopsis ==
John Giorno shown in extreme close-up in Sleep

Sleep is a silent black-and-white film showing Giorno asleep. It is over five hours long, divided across five reels. Although the lack of action gives the illusion of continuity, the film is spliced together from many shorter shots.

The film's opening shot lasts only four-and-a-half minutes, but it is repeated six times. The rest of the reel uses six unique shots, first shown sequentially, then alternating between the first two, then looping the last four. The second reel uses three repeated shots of Giorno's buttocks and one repeated shot of his head. The third reel of Sleep uses only a single four-and-a-half minute shot of Giorno sleeping on his back, looped for an hour and a half. The fourth reel uses a single four-and-a-half minute close-up of Giorno's head looped for 86 minutes. The final reel has the most variation, with nine unique shots over 49 minutes. It is the only reel in which Warhol uses a fragment of a shot instead of including the shot in its entirety.

== Production ==
Warhol had initially wanted French actress Brigitte Bardot for the film but she was not available at the time.

=== Photography ===
Throughout mid-1963 Warhol spent weekends at a farmhouse at the Mallett Estate in Lyme, Connecticut, the summer home of gallery owner Eleanor Ward. There, he began shooting footage for Sleep. He used a Bolex 16 mm camera. This limited him to 100-foot (30 m) reels that each lasted three minutes. He spent months trying to learn how to operate the camera effectively. Warhol ultimately shot eight hours of footage, although Sleep ended up being at most 5 and half hours. Reportedly, Warhol only used around 30 minutes of the footage.

=== Post-production ===
Warhol took some of the shots and flipped the film stock such that light from the projector hit the base before the emulsion. Sarah Dalton, who had worked with Warhol on some of his silkscreens, edited the film. He instructed her to omit footage that contained too much motion and "try and make it more the same." To structure the shots in Sleep, Dalton put together storyboards of Giorno's figure. She repeated some of the shots for extended periods of time and assembled the footage. Although the film was shot at 24 frames per second, the standard speed for sound films, it is projected at the slower rate of 16 fps, an older standard for silent films. Warhol put together an ad hoc soundtrack by having a radio play softly from a cinema balcony. However, he discontinued this practice after the first few screenings.

In 1964, La Monte Young provided a loud minimalist drone soundtrack to Sleep when shown as small TV-sized projections at the entrance lobby to the third New York Film Festival held at Lincoln Center.

== Release ==
Sleep premiered on January 17, 1964, presented by film critic Jonas Mekas, at the Gramercy Arts Theater in New York City as a fundraiser for the Film-Makers' Cooperative. Of the nine people who attended the premiere, two left during the first hour. Mekas and fellow critic Archer Winsten were in the audience, as well as Paul Morrissey, a friend of the projectionist Ken Jacobs; Morrissey later became a frequent collaborator with Warhol. When the Cinema Theatre in Los Angeles held a surprise screening of Sleep later in the year, audience members shouted at the screen and threatened to riot.

The duration of Sleep was trimmed to 15 minutes when it was screened with its successor Kiss at Boston's Park Square Cinema in July 1964. Only 12 minutes of the Sleep was shown at the New York Film Festival in September 1964, but it was repeated continuously throughout the evening.

Images from the film appear in later artworks by Warhol. His 1965 sculpture Large Sleep uses two successive frames from the film, arranged vertically on a sheet of plexiglass. Another plexiglass sculpture uses three successive frames of Sleep, silkscreened in black ink, with a red image silkscreened on the other side. This work is now lost.

== Reception ==
Film Culture voted to award Warhol its Independent Film Award for Sleep, Haircut, Eat, Kiss, and Empire.

Commemorating the fiftieth anniversary of Warhol's Sleep, Finnish filmmaker Juha Lilja created a remake of the film.

== See also ==
- Andy Warhol filmography
- Blue Movie (1969) – Warhol film
- Eat (1964) – Warhol film
- Kiss (1963) – Warhol film
- List of American films of 1964
- List of longest films by running time
