= Sock and Awe =

2008 video game

- Developer: Alex Tew
- Release: 18 December 2008
- Genre: Newsgame
- Mode: Single-player

Sock and Awe is a minimalist 2008 Flash game created by British entrepreneur Alex Tew, recreating the Bush shoeing incident and putting the player in control of journalist Muntadar al-Zaidi who flung a shoe at George W. Bush during a news conference. Although the game was hastily put together, it went viral and received widespread news coverage right around its release, only a day after the actual incident. It is a well-known example of a newsgame. The name of the game is a pun on the US shock and awe military tactic.

== Release ==
Alex Tew, the author, was a "student entrepreneur" at the time, and previously "Internet famous" for The Million Dollar Homepage, a successful ploy website that helped him pay for his college tuition. On 18 December, the day of the shoe throwing incident, Tew was part of a group of people on Twitter trading ideas on what might be a good tabloid headline describing the incident when somebody suggested "Sock and Awe." Already by the following day, Tew had registered the domain sockandawe.com, developed and uploaded the game. Two days later, the game had already been played 1.4 million times. At the end of the week, Tew had managed to sell the site on eBay for £5,215 GBP to a company called Fubra. Tew cheekily commented to a Reuters journalist: "From Monday concept, Tuesday launch, Wednesday growth, we’ve had a Thursday exit." By 22 December, 49 million shoes had been thrown in the game.

== Copycat games ==
While the game's crudeness has meant it has remained mostly uncommented on in video gaming academia, the mainstream media attention it received motivated several other game developers to try their hand at similar newsgames. At least nine copycat shoe-throwing games were created, and the creator behind Raid Gaza!, Marcus Richter, later cited Sock and Awe as an inspiration for his game. Tew developing and releasing this game was one of the reasons why Milo Yiannopoulos, in a tongue-in-cheek manner, referred to Tew as the "most annoying man on the Internet."
