= 24 Hour Psycho =

1993 art installation film by Douglas Gordon

- Directed by: Douglas Gordon
- Based on: Psycho by Alfred Hitchcock
- Produced by: Douglas Gordon
- Edited by: Douglas Gordon
- Release date: 1993
- Running time: 24 hours
- Country: United Kingdom
- Language: Silent

24 Hour Psycho is a 1993 art installation video by Scottish artist Douglas Gordon. It is an appropriation of Alfred Hitchcock's 1960 psychological thriller film Psycho, slowed down to approximately two frames per second from its original 24. As a result, the film lasts for precisely 24 hours, rather than the original running time of 109 minutes (1 hour, 49 minutes).

First shown in 1993 at Tramway Art Centre in Glasgow, Scotland, and at the Kunst-Werke Institute for Contemporary Art in Berlin, Germany, 24 Hour Psycho was Gordon's first work to showcase his theme of repetition. In 2008, Gordon created a second installation entitled 24 Hour Psycho Back and Forth and To and Fro, which consists of two simultaneous projections of 24 Hour Psycho placed side-by-side. One projection plays the film normally while the other plays it in reverse, briefly culminating in a convergence at the centre for an identical shot.

== Synopsis ==
An art installation, 24 Hour Psycho consists entirely of an appropriation of Alfred Hitchcock's 1960 psychological thriller film Psycho, slowed down to approximately two frames per second from its original 24. As a result, the film lasts for precisely 24 hours, rather than the original running time of 109 minutes (1 hour, 49 minutes). There is no audio. The installation is displayed at the centre of a dark room and projected onto a translucent screen so that it may be viewed from either side.

== Production ==
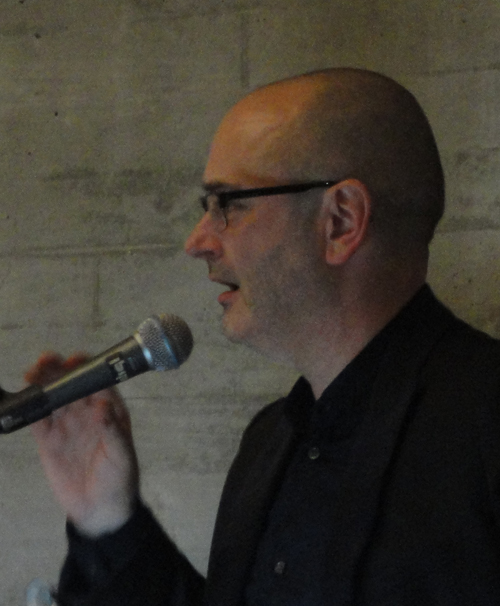
Douglas Gordon in 2013

Douglas Gordon is a Scottish artist known for his use of conceptual art and repetition in his work. He often uses scenes from other films to create his video art. 24 Hour Psycho was his first work to use such repetition.

Gordon didn't see Psycho until the age of 21 and rewatched the film repeatedly—including in slow motion. This, which Gordon calls an "active curiosity", inspired him to create 24 Hour Psycho. To create the film, Gordon used a VHS tape of Psycho and played it through a cassette deck that possessed the ability to slow play videos to an extreme capacity. Reflecting on 24 Hour Psycho in 2010, Gordon says that his tenacity is what made the project happen. He was assisted by several artists who tried to work out how to make the film, with the first cost estimate being three times the budget of Psycho. But Gordon found "fantastic contacts" in Glasgow who enabled him to bring the idea to fruition.

The Guardian writes that as Gordon's first film, 24 Hour Psycho introduced several important themes in his future work: "recognition and repetition, time and memory, complicity and duplicity, authorship and authenticity, darkness and light." Gordon regards 24 Hour Psycho not as an appropriation, but more as an "affiliation", stating that it was not simply a case of abduction. He regards Psycho (1960) as a masterpiece in its own right, and wanted to maintain Hitchcock's authorship in his work. As such, he further states that he hopes when people watch 24 Hour Psycho they give Hitchcock significantly more consideration than himself.

== Release, reception and legacy ==
24 Hour Psycho was first shown in 1993 at Tramway Art Centre in Glasgow, Scotland, and at the Kunst-Werke Institute for Contemporary Art in Berlin, Germany. For its Berlin screening, the film was shown via a VCR equipped with a shuttle control that allowed it to play in extreme slow motion. It was displayed on a 10 by 14 foot (3.0 by 4.3 m) translucent screen that leaned against one of the room's pillars for support. In contrast to Psycho—which did not allow late admissions upon Hitchcock's request—viewers may enter and exit the exhibition for 24 Hour Psycho at will.

In 2006, Ken Johnson of The New York Times wrote that although few people have seen 24 Hour Psycho, "and hardly anyone has sat through the whole thing, Douglas Gordon's 24 Hour Psycho has become one of those mythic monuments that embody the dreams, anxieties and aspirations of a generation." Brian Price, writing for Oxford University Press, bemoaned in 2010 that the select showings of 24 Hour Psycho made it a privilege to see rather than an amazement, calling it "limited-access cinema". Katrina M. Brown, writing for the Gagosian Quarterly in 2018, wrote that because of the widespread public knowledge of Psycho (1960), no one would have to watch 24 Hours of Psycho to find out what happens in the film, "so the viewing [experience] becomes inextricably connected to memory, be it accurate or fallible." Brown further calls 24 Hour Psycho an "audacious move", saying that while the film is "often talked about as [a] sculpture," the actual viewing experience of the film is "undoubtedly spatial, but also intensely visual: there is, of course, no sound in the work, though several people seem to recall hearing it—an apt trick of memory, perhaps." Brown also notes that the renown of 24 Hour Psycho makes it a substantial part of Douglas' work; it has been widely exhibited "all over the world" and is "regularly cited as a key work of the 1990s."

=== Aftermath ===
Gordon's 5 Year Drive-By (1995)—which slows down The Searchers (1956) to a length of five years—was described by him as "something of a companion piece" to 24 Hour Psycho. In 2008, Gordon created a second installation entitled 24 Hour Psycho Back and Forth and To and Fro, which consists of two simultaneous projections of 24 Hour Psycho placed side-by-side. One projection plays the film normally while the other, mirrored projection plays it in reverse, briefly culminating in a convergence at the centre for an identical mirrored shot. Brown notes that this results in unpredictable—yet "remarkable"—juxtapositions and tension, because "what has happened before will also happen in the future, and, of course, vice versa." The 2010 short novel Point Omega by American author Don DeLillo heavily references 24 Hour Psycho, and uses it as a framing device. In it, DeLillo is mesmerised by the "radically altered plane of time", noting "The less there was to see, the harder he looked, the more he saw." The book both begins and ends with 24 Hour Psycho.

By 2012, New York-based artist Chris Bors responded by tweaking the film as 24 Second Psycho while accommodating the short attention span of information age society.

== Themes and analysis ==
For Christine Ross, 24 Hour Psycho plays out "the loss of time, the need for time, and the institutional depreciation of time". Ross writes that, by replicating Psycho in extreme slow motion and removing the audio, 24 Hour Psycho changes the original narrative of the film so much that one's "memory and perception clash over the reconstruction of the film" as "the viewer fails to recreate the original story." As most viewers will likely have at least heard of Psycho, the audience's perception of 24 Hour Psycho is dictated by mental processes that each involve memory, like "remembrance, recall, expectation, and anticipation." However, the slow motion makes Psycho difficult to recall, as it amplifies more details and editing techniques for the audience to perceive, yet it simultaneously dissolves the original film's narrative structure to the point where "more often than not, there is nothing to see." Ross further adds that—in relation to cognitive science—the slow motion brings the viewer into a state of "perceptual and memory insufficiency" as even though the viewer can anticipate what will happen next, the slowed extended duration prevents one's memory from matching the images to Psycho, making it hard for the viewer to grasp the narrative. Thus, the viewer "becomes depressed and inhibited in their perceptual activity."

Philip Monk writes that, despite Psycho's familiarity, the extreme slowness makes the plot incomprehensible and unable to match the viewer's memory or concept of time, while also freeing the viewer from the film's time. He writes that 24 Hour Psycho diverts the audience from the traditional pattern of watching films by nullifying time all together, endlessly postponing the "catharsis associated with this genre of entertainment" and complicating the audience's perception of time. 24 Hour Psycho instead subjects the characters of Hitchcock's film to a "celluloid prison where they are condemned to attend their fate in a slow-motion trap." Monk further adds that 24 Hour Psycho simulates the psychological disturbance and madness of Norman Bates; while Hitchcock's film shows the madness of Bates before the psychologist at the end of the film explains his mental disturbance, 24 Hour Psycho "actualises it" by making his madness visible instead of referring to it. By muting the sound, Gordon accomplishes in 24 hour Psycho what "Hitchcock perhaps intended as a cinematic trope: to show Norman's madness by sight" alone.

Klaus Pieter Biesenbach writes that "duration is immeasurable" and has its own "inner rhythm", saying that the more detailed a memory of a certain period, the longer it seems to have been. To Biesenbach, 24 Hour Psycho intensifies this quality by exposing Psycho's subliminal moments as all theatrical elements—noting suspense and climax—become obsolete. He argues that the scale and size of films matter, writing that today most classical films are seen at home rather than in the cinema, but Gordon rescales such films close to their original presentation size by usually exhibiting them on "ten-by-twelve-foot screens" when exhibiting his artwork in museums and art galleries. Biesenbach also adds that viewers of 24 Hour Psycho would attempt to compare their memories of the original film to Gordon's artwork, which "so explicitly alludes to the idea of life as a storyboard, containing suspense and unexpected turns that occur according to the commonly understood logic of the psychoanalysed human being."

Laura Mulvey writes that 24 Hour Psycho represents the rise of home video, calling it a "celebration" of the new options that films on home media offer—such as playback speed. She notes that anyone who wishes can now "play with the film image and, perhaps, in the process, evolve voyeurism and investment in spectacle into something closer to fetishism and investment in repetition, detail and personal obsession", just as Gordon had done.

== See also ==
- List of longest films
- Collage film
