= Sleep (2013 film) =

Swedish experimental film by Juha Lilja

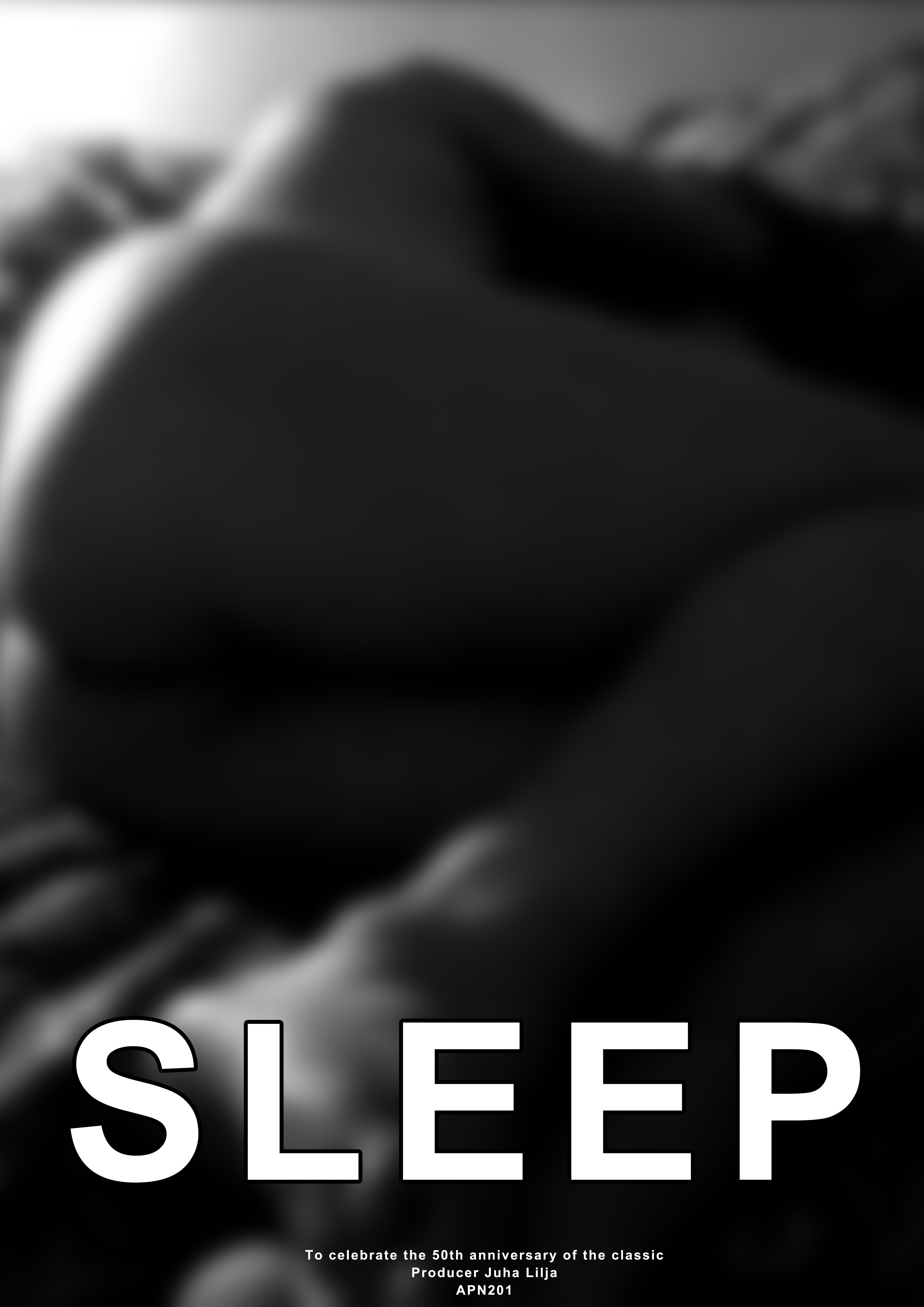
- Film poster
- Directed by: Lilja Juha
- Written by: Lilja Juha
- Produced by: Lilja Juha
- Edited by: Lilja Juha
- Release date: 2013
- Running time: 8 hours
- Country: Sweden

Sleep is a 2013 film directed by Juha Lilja consisting of approximately 1 hour long takes about Lilja himself sleeping naked. Multiple camera angles are used, and the film also contains dream sequences, which are shot on a drone and a motorcycle. The film premiered at International Film Festival Rotterdam in 2015 as a part of its Signals 24/7 theme, which was focusing on how the attention economy and technological improvements have changed society. Other films from the director have been screened in festivals in Asia and USA.

The film was released 50 years after the release of Sleep (1963) from American artist and filmmaker Andy Warhol. The 2013 remake explores how modern technology has made it easier for anyone to produce such monumental length films. Warhol had originally planned Sleep to be an 8-hour film. According to his memoirs, he had said to Gerard Malanga: "Wouldn't it be fabulous to film Brigitte Bardot sleeping for eight hours." Because of technical difficulties it was not possible at the time. Lilja's version was made to reach the 8 hour goal.

The film has been subject to academic analysis in Christopher Costabile's master's thesis, "The Value of Sleep: Aura and Aesthetics of Cohabitation in Juha Lilja's Revision of Warhol," conducted at the University of South Florida. Costabile explores Lilja's work as a prime example of "aesthetics of cohabitation," challenging societal norms related to space and time commodification. In his analysis, Costabile delves into Lilja's use of digital technology, drawing on Walter Benjamin's aura concept as interpreted by Boris Groys.

In 2023, 10 years after its release, the movie got unexpected traction after being associated with the sleepstreaming phenomenon. In a couple of days it gained more than 100,000 new views on YouTube. On March 8, 2023 Juha Lilja reported in his YouTube channel that YouTube had removed the video because of violation of sex and nudity policy. This policy states that nudity may be allowed when the purpose is educational, documentary, scientific or artistic, and not gratuitous. In his video about the event, Juha Lilja stated that he was sad because the decision means that YouTube thinks Sleep is not art.

In January 2024 it was announced, that there will be sequel to the film, called by the same name: Sleep, but consisting of footage about Lilja using a mobile phone for 5 hours and 21 minutes.

In 2026, Sleep was featured as part of an installation titled Three Rooms at Anozero'26 Bienal de Coimbra, a biennial art festival held at the Monastery of Santa Clara-a-Nova in Coimbra, Portugal, running from 11 April to 5 July 2026. The installation converted two former monastic cells into overnight rooms, each furnished with a bed, nightstand and lamp: one screening Sleep on a television, the other showing Chantal Akerman's La Chambre (1972). A third cell served as a shared lounge. Overnight guests were expected to vacate before the exhibition reopened each morning. The biennial, curated by Hans Ibelings, John Zeppetelli and Daniel Madeira under the title Segurar, dar, receber ("To hold, to give, to receive"), positioned the installation as a reference to both the monastery's history of inhabitation and its uncertain future, with plans to redevelop the site as a hotel remaining under consideration.

== See also ==
- List of longest films by running time
