= Alex Tew =

English businessman (born 1984)

Alex Tew (born 1984) is a British entrepreneur and the co-founder of the meditation app Calm. He is known for The Million Dollar Homepage in 2005, at the age of 21, which earned him more than $1 million in five months.

== Career ==
Tew was raised in Wiltshire, England. He began meditating when he was fourteen and he frequently read books about concentration, memory, and cognition. He attended a business management program at the University of Nottingham before dropping out in December 2005.

After the success of The Million Dollar Homepage in 2005, Tew began several internet ventures including Pixelotto, which sold advertising space on websites. He founded humor-focused social network called PopJam, and a Million Dollar Homepage-inspired website site called One Million People which featured photos instead of advertisements. He made a Flash game called Sock and Awe in 2008, which was a gamified version of the George W. Bush shoeing incident. While he was the CEO of PopJam in 2011, he and developer Ben Dowling created a site called "Do Nothing For 2 Minutes".

Tew moved to San Francisco and co-founded Calm with Michael Acton Smith in 2012 and is CEO. The company operates a meditation app.
