= The Cure for Insomnia =

1987 film by John Henry Timmis IV

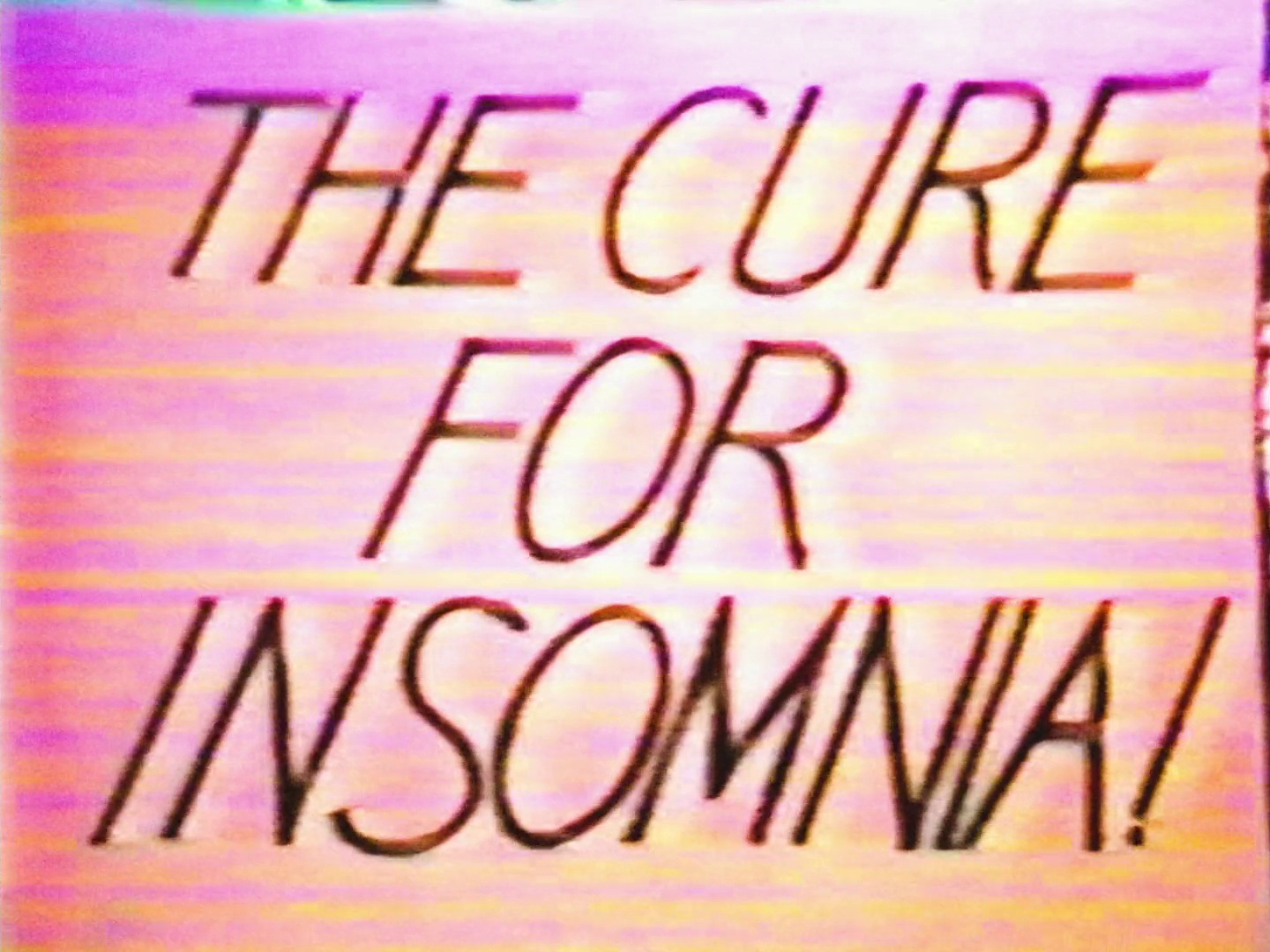
- Title card from the film
- Directed by: John Henry Timmis IV
- Written by: Nickoli Schirripa
- Produced by: Joseph Emm Matune
- Starring: Lee Groban
- Cinematography: John Henry Timmis IV
- Edited by: Sean Jay Manning
- Production company: Destruction Productions
- Release date: January 31, 1987
- Running time: 5,220 minutes (87 hours)
- Country: United States
- Language: English

The Cure for Insomnia is a 1987 experimental film directed by John Henry Timmis IV, which was, according to Guinness World Records, the longest running film. At 5,220 minutes long (87 hours, or 3 days and 15 hours) in length, the film has no plot, instead consisting of artist L. D. Groban reading his 4,080-page poem A Cure for Insomnia over the course of three and a half days, spliced with occasional clips from heavy metal and pornographic videos.

It was first played in its entirety at the School of the Art Institute of Chicago (Illinois), from January 31 to February 3, 1987, in one continuous showing. It has not been released on DVD or other home video formats and all known copies are considered to be lost, with only 85 seconds of the film being available.

== See also ==
- List of longest films by running time
