= Geomium =

Social network

- Company type: Private company
- Website type: Social networking
- Founded: 2009
- Headquarters: London, {{{location_country}}}
- Country of origin: United Kingdom
- Founders: Ben Dowling, Michael Fergusson
- CEO: Michael Fergusson
- Website: http://geomium.com
- Current status: Defunct

Geomium is a location-based social networking website, and iPhone application, founded by Ben Dowling and Michael Fergusson. Unlike many other location-based services which focus on a single type of information, such as places or events, Geomium combines places, events, deals and people all into a single application. It aggregates its information from sources such as Yelp, Qype and Eventful. The service launched to the public on 29 September 2010, focusing initially on London, UK, with more cities and mobile platforms are planned.

In addition to all of the aggregated local information Geomium provides real-time location updates, allowing users to see exactly where their friends are, rather than the last location they checked into. In addition to private member-to-member communication the site features "shouts", public location-tagged announcements and recommendations that other users can comment on.

Geomium doesn't offer "badges" or other game mechanic type rewards that are currently popular among location-based services. Instead it is aiming to be a useful application that is attractive to the mass consumer, and aims to "connect people with the people and places around them, creating a social awareness that does not currently exist".

According to Ben Dowling, Geomium was discontinued in November 2011, with an open email to 50,000 users from its founders. Later on, in April 2013, Ben Dowling founded another location-focused business, an IP address data provider, IPinfo.io.
