= Superflex =

Danish artists' group

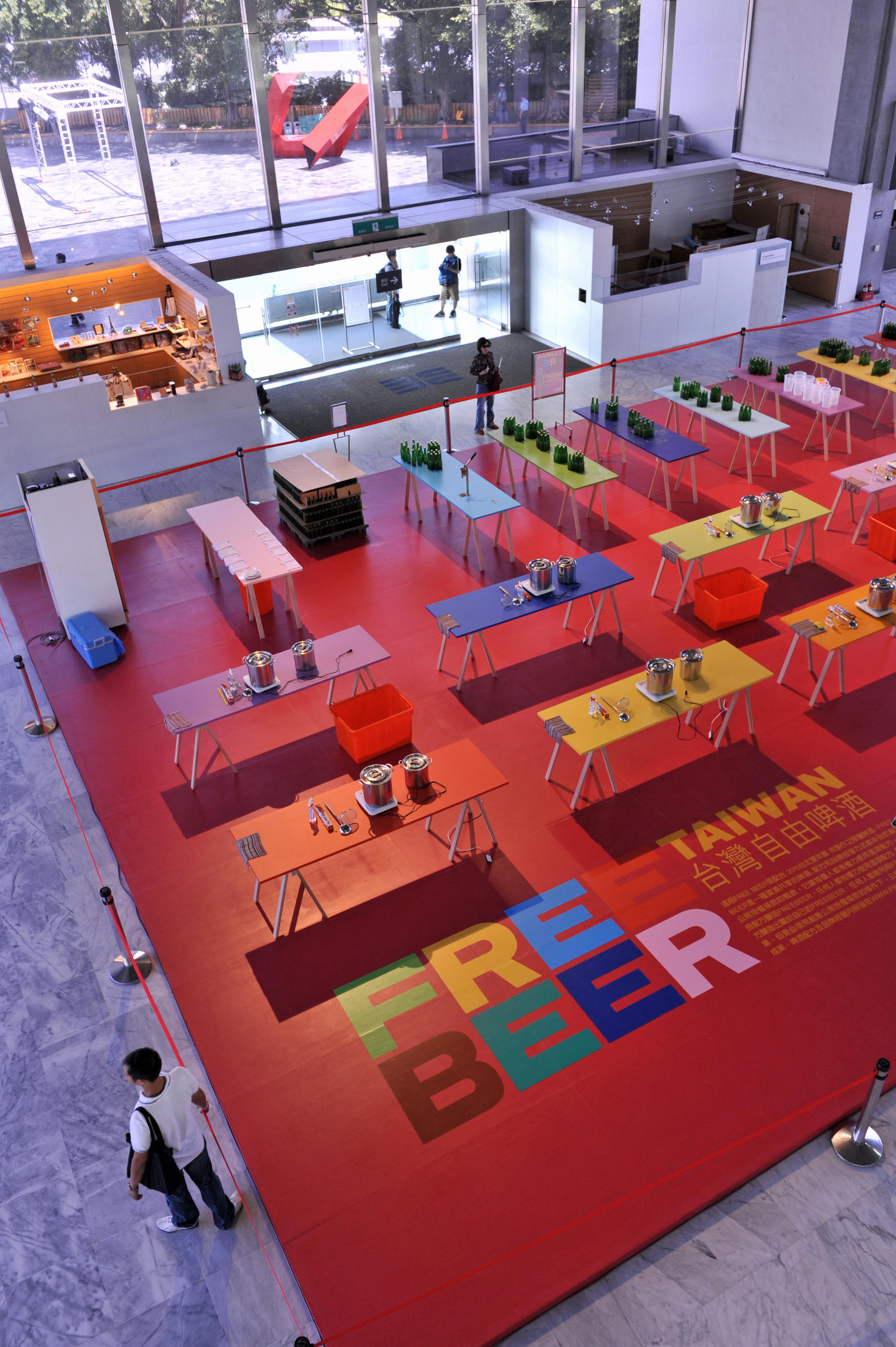
Superflex Workshop "Free Beer Factory" on the Taipei Biennial 2010

Superflex is a Danish artist group founded in 1993 by Jakob Fenger, Rasmus Nielsen and Bjørnstjerne Christiansen. Superflex describe their projects as Tools, as proposals that invite people to participate in and communicate the development of experimental models that alter the economic production conditions. Often the projects are assisted by experts who bring in their special interest, these tools can then be further used and modified by their users.

Often their projects are related to economic forces, democratic production conditions and self-organisation. Superflex has examined alternative energy production methods (Supergas) and commodity production in Brazil, Thailand and Europe in their projects, which both expose and question the existing economic structures. These artistic activities — as, for example, the ongoing project Guaraná Power, in which the artists developed a drink together with local farmers who cultivate the caffeine-rich berries of the guarana plant — are not necessarily opposed to commercialism and globalisation, but try instead to render economic structures visible and to establish a new balance.

Through their projects engaging with alternative models for the creation, dissemination and maintenance of social and economic organisation – such as Copyshop, Guaraná Power, Rebranding Denmark and Free Beer – Superflex has become involved in legal disputes, as well as suffered prohibition orders and police raids, relating to their artistic use of commercial signs and symbols. However, finding that the restrictions placed on their work sometimes led to unexpectedly interesting results, Superflex began to explore the productive potential of prohibition and conceived a series of projects structured to impose regulations on others.

Superflex has gained international recognition for their projects. They have had solo exhibitions, among others, at the Kunsthalle Basel in Switzerland (Supershow — more than a show), GFZK in Leipzig, Germany (Social Pudding in collaboration with Rirkrit Tiravanija), Schirn Kunsthalle in Frankfurt am Main (Open market), the REDCAT Gallery in Los Angeles (Guarana Power), Mori Museum in Tokyo, Gallery 1301PE in Los Angeles and the Hirshhorn Museum and Sculpture Garden. Superflex has participated in international arts biennials such as the Gwangju biennial in Korea, Istanbul Biennial, São Paulo Biennial, Shanghai Biennial and in the "Utopia Station" exhibition at the Venice Biennale. They contributed to the exhibition Rethink Kakotopia shown at the Nikolaj Centre of Contemporary Art in Copenhagen 2009 and at Tensta Konsthall 2010.

== Films ==
- Burning Car (2008)
- Flooded McDonalds (2009)
- The Financial Crisis (2009)
- Modern Times Forever (Stora Enso Building, Helsinki) (2011)

== Publications ==
An Artist with 6 Legs
Editor: Pernille Albrethsen. 336 pages, ISBN 978-87-88944-97-6
Published by Kunsthal Charlottenborg 2014
Superflex
The Corrupt Show
Editor: Patrick Charpenel & Daniel McClean. 360 pages, ISBN 978-607-95845-4-2
Published by Verlag der Buchhandlung Walther König 2013
Superkilen
Editor: Barbara Steiner, Photos: Iwan Baan, Hans Joosten, Torben Eskerod, Graphic design: Rasmus Koch.
224 pages, Format: 225 x 265 mm, Publication date: October 2013.
ISBN 978-91-87543-02-9
Tools
Editor Babara Steiner in cooperation with Superdesign. 295 pages.
Published by Verlag der Buchhandlung Walther König 2003.
ISBN 3-88375-612-1
Self-organisation/Counter-economic Strategies
Edited by Will Bradley, Mika Hannula, Cristina Ricupero and Superflex.
Published by Sternberg Press 2006
ISBN 1-933128-13-5
Supermanual - The incomplete guide to the Superchannel
Published by FACT, Liverpool UK, 2000
ISBN 0-9521221-3-8
Remarks on interventive tendencies - Meetings between different economies in contemporary art.
Edited by Henrik Plenge Jakobsen, Lars Bang Larsen and Superflex
Published by Borgen 2000
Distribution: Buchhandlung Walther König, Cologne
ISBN 87 21 01624 0
Tools
Infosite5 / Superflex-Tools / Kunstverein Wolfsburg 1999-2000
By Doris Berger
Published for the exhibition TOOLS in Kunstverein Wolfsburg.
Three public projects
Published by Blekinge Lansmuseum and Statens Konst Råd, Sweden, 1999

== Public art ==
=== All That We Know ===
Made up of six large sculptures consisting of fruits and vegetables that for centuries are believed to contain healing properties capable of bringing vitality. SUPERFLEX’s goal was to connect the link between science and traditional medicine, by highlighting the evolving relationship between societies' knowledge of nature; the perception changed overtime based on scientific investigations many became complacent with the position natures taken in medical and scientific fields, but yet many publications show home remedies and mythologize the benefits of a natural method. Their naturalistic appearance was achieved with an MRI scanner to create the three dimensional renders.

=== Superkilen ===
An urban park project in Copenhagen is divided into three main areas: the red square, the black market and the green park. While the red square designates the modern, urban life with café, music and sports, the black market is the classic square with fountain and benches. The green park is a park for picnics, sports and walking the dog. The people living in the vicinity of the park are of more than 50 nationalities. Instead of using the designated city objects/furnitures used for parks and public spaces, people from the area were asked to nominate city objects such as benches, bins, trees, playgrounds, manhole covers and signage from other countries. These objects were chosen from a country of the inhabitant's national origin or from somewhere else encountered through traveling. The objects were produced in a 1:1 copy or bought and transported to the site.

Five groups traveled to Palestine, Spain, Thailand, Texas and Jamaica in order to acquire five objects. The objects have been installed throughout the park. The park has more than 100 objects from than 50 countries. Commissioned by the City of Copenhagen and Realdania, the concept for Superkilen was developed by Superflex in collaboration with architectural firms Bjarke Ingels Group (BIG) and Topotek1.

=== Power Toilets ===
Power Toilets is a permanent public art work erected on a beach in the recreation area Park van Luna in Heerhugowaard, The Netherlands. The interior of the lavatory building is a copy of the toilets used by the members of the United Nations Security Council in the UN headquarters in New York City, identical in detail to that of the sanitary facilities at one of the most secure buildings in the world. Typical for the 1950s corporate style the design includes marble, big mirrors, stainless steel, yellow ceramic tiles, grey anthracite mosaic floor tiles and American Standard appliances.

Power Toilets was designed in collaboration with Nezu Aymo architects. Originally commissioned by DRFTWD office associates for the municipality of Heerhugowaard in 2004, it was accomplished in 2010 with support from the province of Noord-Holland and SKOR, Foundation Art and Public Space. Contractors: Bouwbedrijf Gerrits and Sinnige b.v. and Sculpfiction.

== Public collections ==
Superflex' works are represented in public art institutions such as:

- MoMA (New York)
- Queensland Art Gallery (Brisbane)
- Louisiana Museum of Modern Art (Denmark)
- FRAC - Nord-Pas de Calais (Dunkerque)
- Galerie für Zeitgenössische Kunst Leipzig
- MUSEION - Museum für moderne und zeitgenössische Kunst (Bolzano)
- Coleccion Jumex (Mexico City)
- Van Abbemuseum (Eindhoven)
- Museum Boijmans van Beuningen (Rotterdam)
- The Museum of Contemporary Art (Oslo)
- Musac - Museo de Arte Contemporáneo de Castilla y León (Spain)
- Kunsthaus Zürich (Switzerland)

They have been commissioned to produce the 2017 Hyundai Turbine Hall installation at the Tate Modern gallery in London, opening 3 October.

== Marks of honor/awards ==
- International Association of Art Critics, Annual Prize Denmark 1997.
- George Maciunas Award,2009.
- Civic Trust Awards, UK, 2013.
- AIA - American Institute of Architects - 2013 Institute Honor Awards for Regional and Urban Design, USA, 2013.
- IEDC - International Economic Development Council Promotional awards, 2012.
- MvdR Prize - Mies van der Rohe Prize 2013 - Finalist
