= Josh Azzarella =

American artist

- Born: 1978 (age 47–48); Akron, Ohio, U.S.
- Education: University of Akron; Mason Gross School of the Arts, Rutgers University
- Known for: Photography, Video art
- Awards: 2006 Emerging Artist Award from the Aldrich Contemporary Art Museum, Ridgefield, Connecticut, U.S.

Josh Azzarella (born 1978) is an American artist based in St. Louis, Missouri. He was born in Ohio.

== Education ==
Azzarella received a BFA from the Myers School of Art at the University of Akron and an MFA from the Mason Gross School of the Arts at Rutgers University.

== Photography ==
Azzarella's photographic work has focused on altered images of historical and widely circulated events. In a 2010 review, The New Yorker described his photographs as images originally taken by other people, often documenting "historic, disastrous, or peculiar" events, from which he digitally removes the central subject, leaving "hauntingly emptied-out landscapes and interiors". Writing in The Brooklyn Rail in 2008, Josh Morgenthau discussed works in which Azzarella removed key figures or events from familiar images, including the Tank Man photograph, the My Lai massacre photographs, the raising of the flag at Iwo Jima, and John Filo's Kent State photograph.

== Video ==
Azzarella has also worked in video. His work Untitled #125 (Hickory) (2009–2011) reworks a sequence from The Wizard of Oz. In 2022, he presented Untitled #175 (... hitting an all time low...) in the exhibition Triple Feature at City Gallery Wellington in Wellington, New Zealand.

== Controversy ==
In 2008, Azzarella was scheduled to be included in the exhibition The Aesthetics of Terror at the Chelsea Art Museum in New York City. The exhibition was cancelled by the museum. Fox News reported that Azzarella's work was among the works cited in the controversy surrounding the show.

== Reception ==
Writing in The Brooklyn Rail in 2008, Josh Morgenthau discussed works in which Azzarella removed key figures or events from familiar images, describing the results as "seamless forgeries" that revisited widely known photographs in altered form. In a 2010 review, The New Yorker described his photographs as images of "historic, disastrous, or peculiar" events from which the central subject had been digitally removed, leaving "hauntingly emptied-out landscapes and interiors".

In a 2008 profile in Newcity, Jason Foumberg wrote that Azzarella's solo exhibition at Kavi Gupta Gallery initially appeared to be a straightforward landscape show, but that the images' "erasures, replacements and re-layerings" complicated that reading by producing "events without actors" and "actors without events". Reporting from Art Chicago in 2010, Hyperallergic described Azzarella's digitally manipulated images as works in which familiar scenes from the war on terror were made to appear commonplace through the removal of their central elements, leaving vacant landscapes and skies that remained ominous by suggestion.

== Collaborations ==
In 2019, Azzarella participated in Art + Music, a collaboration between the Louisville Orchestra and the Kentucky College of Art and Design. His contribution to the fourth movement of Schumann's Symphony No. 3 used digital imaging technology directed at the performers to translate changes in light and color into electronic sound integrated into the orchestral score. Reviewing the event, Arts-Louisville wrote that conductor Teddy Abrams described the project as "unprecedented", and noted the use of imaging technology to generate sound from the performers in real time. Coverage in Symphony also described Azzarella's work as a time-based response that translated light from the musicians and instruments into sound.

Also in 2019, Azzarella collaborated with choreographer Justin Michael Hogan on 35 662618 632814 5 for the Louisville Ballet's #ChorShow. Reviewing the performance, Louisville Public Media described the work as "a fascinating exploration of the intersections of humans and technology" and noted its combination of live dance, prerecorded video, and live capture.

== Collections ==
Azzarella's work is included in the collections of the Museum of Fine Arts, Houston, the Pennsylvania Academy of the Fine Arts, the Madison Museum of Contemporary Art, the San Jose Museum of Art, the Akron Art Museum, the Los Angeles County Museum of Art, and the San Francisco Museum of Modern Art. The Los Angeles County Museum of Art holds Untitled #100 (Fantasia) (2007–2009), and the San Francisco Museum of Modern Art holds Untitled #238 (Bryan) (2007).

== Museum exhibitions ==
- Aldrich Contemporary Art Museum, Connecticut
- Akron Art Museum, Ohio
- San Jose Museum of Art, California
- Indianapolis Museum of Contemporary Art, Indiana
- Zimmerli Museum of Fine Art at Rutgers University, New Jersey
- Montclair Art Museum, New Jersey
- Torrance Art Museum, California
- Barrick Museum of Art, Nevada
- University Art Museum at California State University Long Beach, California
- City Gallery Wellington, Wellington, New Zealand
