= Firebox.com =

Firebox
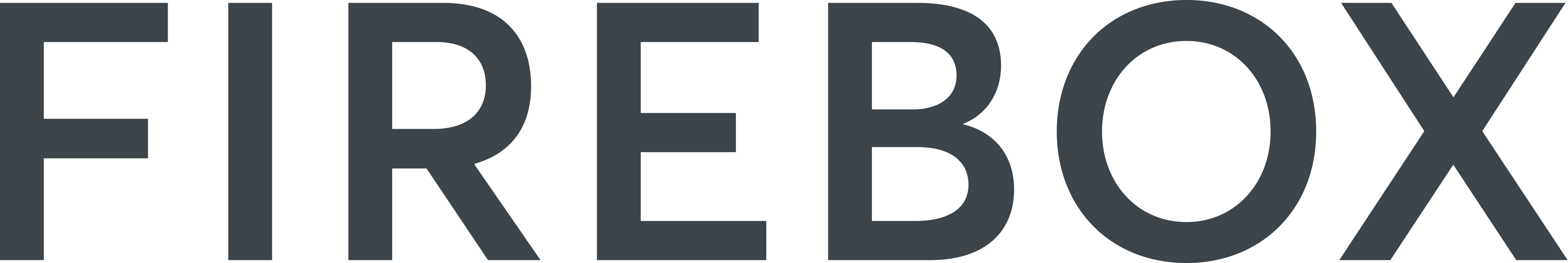
- Firebox logo 2017

- Website type: Online Retailer
- Available in: English
- Headquarters: London, England
- Owners: Michael Smith and Tom Boardman
- Website: https://www.firebox.com/
- Commercial: Yes
- Launched: June 1998
- Current status: Online

Firebox is an online retailer based in London, England, that was created in 1998 as hotbox.co.uk, an internet retailer founded by university friends Michael Acton Smith and Tom Boardman. Their inventory covers many different products from homewares, lifestyle accessories, unique tech, and unusual alcohol gifts.

== History ==
Two friends in college, Michael Acton Smith and Tom Boardman decided that they had a good idea for a new drinking game – the Shot Glass Chess Set. The idea prompted them to create a completely online company where people could purchase this and other obscure but “cool” products. The idea was to create a site where the public could meet with original and interesting products. They began in Cardiff, Wales as hotbox.co.uk, then in 1999 moved to London and relaunched as Firebox.com.

Most of the products sold on Firebox are skewed towards people who are into obscure or abstract items that are unique and hard to come by otherwise. The site states: "We're very selective though - so only the most original, most exciting products get picked".
