= Douglas Gordon =

Scottish artist

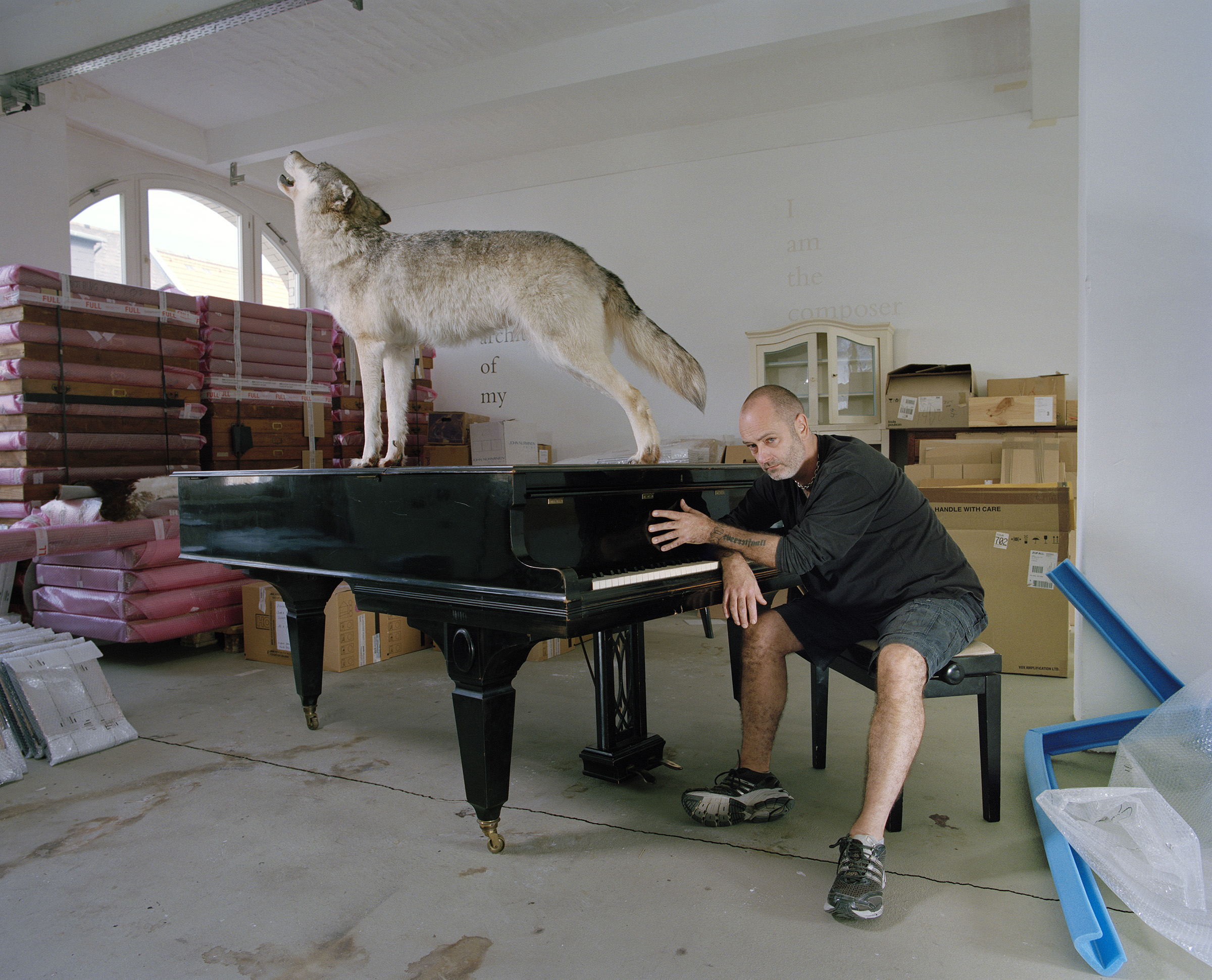
- Douglas Gordon photographed by Oliver Mark, Berlin 2012
- Born: 20 September 1966 (age 60); Glasgow, Scotland
- Education: Glasgow School of Art, Glasgow; Slade School of Fine Art, London
- Known for: Video art, Photography
- Notable work: 24 Hour Psycho (1993); Zidane: A 21st Century Portrait (2006)
- Movement: Young British Artists
- Awards: Hugo Boss Prize (1998), Turner Prize (1996)

Douglas Gordon (born 20 September 1966) is a Scottish artist. He won the Turner Prize in 1996, the Premio 2000 at the 47th Venice Biennale in 1997 and the Hugo Boss Prize in 1998. He lives and works in Berlin, Germany.

== Work ==
Much of Gordon's work is seen as being about memory and uses repetition in various forms. He uses material from the public realm and also creates performance-based videos. His work often overturns traditional uses of video by playing with time elements and employing multiple monitors.

Monster, 1996–7, colour photograph by Douglas Gordon, Private collection

Gordon has often reused older film footage in his photographs and videos. One of his best-known art works is 24 Hour Psycho (1993) which slows down Alfred Hitchcock's film Psycho so that it lasts twenty four hours. In Between Darkness and Light (After William Blake) (1997), William Friedkin's Exorcist (1973) and Henry King's The Song of Bernadette (1943) – two films about adolescent girls driven by external forces – are projected on either side of a single free-standing semi-transparent screen so they can be seen simultaneously. The video installation left is right and right is wrong and left is wrong and right is right (1999) presents two projections of Otto Preminger's Whirlpool (1949) side by side, with the one on the right reversed so that the two sides mirror each other; by digital means, Gordon separated individual frames of the original film so that odd-numbered ones on one side alternate with even-numbered ones on the other. Feature Film (1999) is a projection of Gordon's own film of James Conlon conducting Bernard Herrmann's score to Vertigo, thus drawing attention to the film score and the emotional responses it creates in the viewer. In one installation, this was placed at the top of a tall building, referencing one of the film's main plot points. In Through a looking glass (1999), Gordon created a double-projection work around the climactic 71-second scene in Martin Scorsese's film Taxi Driver (1976), in which the main character addresses the camera; the screens are arranged so that the character seems to be addressing himself. At first, the 71-second loops are in sync, but they get progressively out and then progressively back with each repetition of the whole, hourlong program.

Originally conceived as a site-specific video projection for Gagosian Gallery in Chelsea, Play Dead; Real Time (2003) consists of two videos projected on two large screens showing a circus elephant named Minnie ponderously performing for an off-screen trainer in the empty, spacious, white-walled gallery room. In each projection the camera circles as the elephant walks around, lies down to play dead and gets up. The footage showing Minnie's sequences of tricks is simultaneously presented in a front and a rear life-sized projection and on a monitor, with each one depicting the same event from a range of perspectives, including close-ups of the animal's eyes. Gordon also made a film about Zinedine Zidane, Zidane, un portrait du 21e siècle (2006), an idea first seen in a film by Hellmuth Costard, who, in 1970, made a film about George Best titled Football as Never Before. The feature-length film, which he co-directed with fellow artist Philippe Parreno and assembled from footage shot by seventeen synchronised cameras placed around the stadium in real time over the course of a single match, premiered outside the competition of the 2006 Cannes Film Festival before screenings at numerous international venues. k.364 premiered at the Venice Film Festival in September 2010.

Gordon has also made photographs, often in series with relatively minor variations between each individual piece. His Blind Stars (2002) featured publicity photographs of mid-century movie stars in which the sitters' eyes were replaced by expressionless black, white or mirrored surfaces.

In 2010, Gordon collaborated with Rufus Wainwright, creating the visuals for his tour which accompany Rufus' All Days Are Nights: Songs for Lulu album. In Phantom (2011), another collaboration with Wainwright, Gordon employs slow-motion film produced with a high-speed Phantom camera focusing on Wainright's eye – blackened with make-up, weeping, and glaring back at the viewer, echoing melodramatic performances by stars of the silent screen.

Gordon created a reversed "Empire" sign, using the "Empire Hotel" sign in Hitchcock's "Vertigo" as his inspiration. The piece is in the New Wynd in Glasgow's Merchant City. It plays on the idea of reality and fiction, and is intended to highlight the part played by Glasgow merchants' exploitation of enslaved people in the tobacco and sugar plantations of the British Empire

== Other activities ==
In 2008, Gordon was a member of the Official Competition Jury at the 65th Venice International Film Festival. He was also a member of the jury that selected Hito Steyerl as recipient of the Käthe Kollwitz Prize in 2019.

== Exhibitions ==
Gordon's first solo show was in 1986. In 1993, he exhibited 24 Hour Psycho in the spaces of Tramway, Glasgow, and at Kunst-Werke Institute for Contemporary Art, Berlin. The Berlin show was curated by Klaus Biesenbach. In 1996, Gordon was one of the artists invited to Skulptur Projekte Münster, and in 1997 he represented Britain at the Venice Biennale. His work was the subject of a 2001 retrospective organised by the Museum of Contemporary Art, Los Angeles, which travelled to the Vancouver Art Gallery, Canada; Museo Rufino Tamayo, Mexico City; and the Hirshhorn Museum and Sculpture Garden, Washington, D.C. In 2005, he put together an exhibition at the Deutsche Guggenheim, Berlin called The Vanity of Allegory. In 2006, Douglas Gordon Superhumanatural opened at the National Galleries of Scotland complex in Edinburgh, being Gordon's first major solo exhibition in Scotland since he presented 24 Hour Psycho in 1993. Also in 2006, the Museum of Modern Art (MoMA) in New York showed a retrospective of Gordon's work, called Timeline, which was curated by Klaus Biesenbach. Another 2006 retrospective was on view at the Kunstmuseum Wolfsburg, Germany, and the Scottish National Gallery of Modern Art, Edinburgh. A survey of his textworks was shown at Tate Britain, London in 2010. Retrospective solo exhibitions were shown at Museum für Moderne Kunst, Frankfurt am Main in 2011 to 2012, Tel Aviv Museum of Art in 2013 and at the Australian Centre for Contemporary Art in Melbourne in 2014. Further solo exhibitions have been held at Museum Folkwang, Essen, Germany 2013, Musée D'art Moderne de la Ville de Paris, 2014. Gordon took part in the Biennale of Sydney 2014 and Documenta 17. In 2019, his works were exhibited at the Arsenale Institute for Politics of Representation, Venice, during the show Hey Psycho!.

== Collections ==
Gallery versions of Zidane, un portrait du 21e siècle (2006) were purchased by the Scottish National Gallery of Modern Art and the Solomon R. Guggenheim Museum, New York. The Guggenheim collection also include Through a Looking Glass (1999) and Tattoo (for Reflection) by Gordon. Several photographs and video installations are in the Migros Museum for contemporary art in Zürich., in the Tate collection, National Galleries of Scotland, Musée D'art Moderne de la Ville de Paris. Play Dead; Real Time (2003) is co-owned by MMK Frankfurt and Hirschhorn Museum and Sculpture Garden Collection. His colour photograph Monster (1996–7) is in the permanent collection of the Honolulu Museum of Art.

The video work Zidane, a 21st century portrait in collaboration with artist Philippe Parreno is featured in the collection of the Pérez Art Museum Miami, Florida, and it was on view in the Get in the Game: Sports, Art, Culture exhibition in 2026.

== Awards ==
- 1996: Turner Prize
- 1997: Venice Biennial's Premio 2000 award
- 1998: Central Kunstpreis awarded by the Kölnischer Kunstverein, Cologne
- 1998: Hugo Boss Prize awarded by the Solomon R. Guggenheim Museum
- 2008: Roswitha Haftmann Prize
- 2011: London Award for Art and Performance
- 2012: Käthe Kollwitz Prize awarded by the Academy of Arts, Berlin
- 2012: Ordre des Arts et des Lettres Grade de Commandeur
- 2018: Elected a Corresponding Fellow of the Royal Society of Edinburgh
