= BevMo! =

American retail chain selling alcoholic beverages

Beverages & More Inc.
- Trade name: BevMo!
- Company type: Privately held company
- Industry: Retailing
- Founded: Concord, California, U.S. (January 1994)
- Founder: Steve Boone; Steve McLaren
- Number of locations: 148 stores (September 2013)
- Area served: California, Arizona, Washington
- Products: Wine, Spirits, Alcoholic beverages
- Revenue: US$500 million (September 2009)
- Owner: GoBrands Inc
- Number of employees: 2,000 (as of November 2020)
- Website: bevmo.com

Beverages & More Inc., doing business as BevMo!, is an American retail chain focusing on the sale of alcoholic drinks. It is a wholly owned subsidiary of Gopuff, after Gopuff announced the acquisition of BevMo! on November 5, 2020.

Previously BevMo! was a privately held corporation based in Concord, California. The company was founded in January 1994 as Beverages & More! in the San Francisco Bay Area, and re-branded as "BevMo!" in January 2001. By October 2009, the company had 100 stores in Arizona and California. As of September 2013, the number had expanded to 148 stores, including 9 in Washington state.

The company's growth has not been without conflict. Expansion into Nevada and Florida in the late 1990s was followed by BevMo! closing those stores for financial reasons. Residents of towns such as Santa Barbara have resisted the establishment of a BevMo! store, citing possible effects ranging from small business decline to increased traffic patterns.

In 1995, BevMo! hired Wilfred Wong as cellar master. Wong, a native San Franciscan who is a veteran wine competition judge and wine writer, assesses wines for the retailer and gives them scores on a 100-point system. Wong keeps a blog on the company's website, and helped establish "Vineyard Partners", an in-house label composed of wines that are specially blended for the retailer.

== Overview ==
BevMo! offers more than 3000 types of wines, 1500 types of spirits, and 1200 types of beers. Most BevMo! stores cater to the community by having weekly beer and wine tasting for a nominal charge, in line with state law, to any consumer of legal age. Because the vast majority of products within the stores are alcoholic, one must be either over the age of 21 or with an adult over the age of 25 in order to enter the store. The Arizona stores accept unexpired identification from all US states, military IDs, passports and Mexico and Canada IDs.

== History ==
The corporation was founded by Steve Boone and Steve McLaren in January 1994, calling itself Beverages & More!, based in Concord, California. In the first year, the company opened six stores in the San Francisco Bay Area.

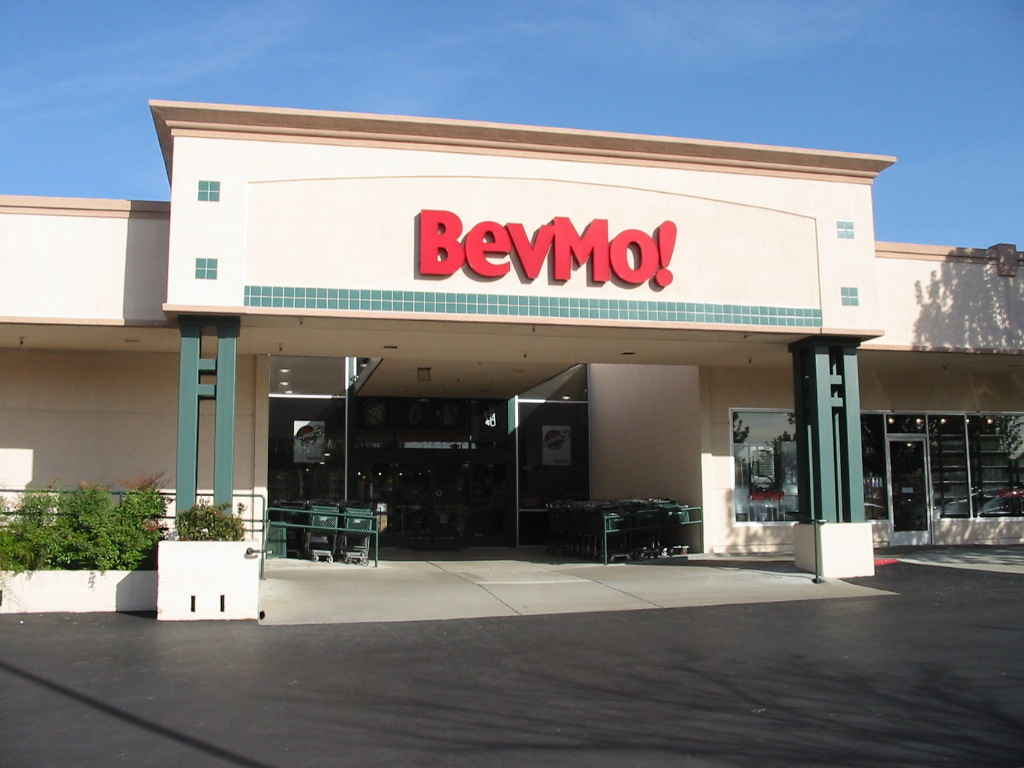
A BevMo! retail store in Walnut Creek, California

Veteran executive Bannus Hudson joined as CEO in 1997, coming from Procter & Gamble. Expansion into the states of Nevada and Florida led to Hudson and Executive Vice President David Richards closing those stores in 1998. Later, a company executive would say of this period, "we almost went broke. We tasted success and then expanded too quickly". After cutbacks, Hudson and Richards determined that future expansion should be limited to Arizona and California, and that store size should be around 7,000 square feet (650 m^{2}), a more manageable size than the chain's biggest 12,000-square-foot (1,100 m^{2}) store. By 2000, the company was making $130 million in sales annually and was the second-largest alcoholic beverage retailer in the US.

In January 1999, Glenn Sobel Management registered the website www.beveragesandmore.com, but Sobel was sued a year later by Beverages & More! for trademark infringement under ICANN jurisdiction. Beverages & More, Inc. aimed to show that their registered trademark "Beverages & More!" was being violated. Their testimony noted that the ampersand and the exclamation point in their trademark were not allowed in domain names, and that the www.beveragesandmore.com domain was the closest analog available to them. In court, Glenn Sobel did not deny that he was in the business of selling domain names, and that his company had never been known as "beveragesandmore". Sobel was admittedly not in the business of selling beverages. In March 2000, the domain was ordered to be immediately transferred from Sobel to Beverages & More! with no fine or penalty—a decision reached by Richard D. Faulkner, an ICANN judge in Dallas, Texas. The decision set a precedent that has since been quoted by complainants in cybersquatting cases to show that a domain name matching a trademark, one held by other than the trademark holder, "is evidence of bad faith registration and use".

Earlier, consumers had been calling the chain "BevMo" as a nickname; as a result, the corporation registered the domain www.bevmo.com in August 2000. In January 2001, the company officially launched the new website and formally adopted the nickname as their brand.

In February 2007, BevMo! was acquired by TowerBrook Capital Partners, L.P., a New York- and London-based private equity firm. With the acquisition, Bannus Hudson retired as CEO—to replace him, TowerBrook brought in Jim Simpson. In February 2009, Alan Johnson was made CEO and he named Charlotte Russe's Dan Carter as CFO and Bare Escentuals' Maria Devries as head of operations. Johnson, a native of Australia, was initially hired as a consultant by TowerBrook to assess BevMo! as an acquisition, and he "fell in love with the company"; by November he was reportedly driving a black BMW with a personalized license plate reading "I ♥ BEVMO" ("I [heart] BevMo"). In September 2009, Johnson reported annual sales of the 1,600-employee company to be "well over" $500 million—a record year. Johnson noted that the introduction of the custom blended and packaged "Vineyard Partners", BevMo!'s private wine label, was a "significant" fraction of sales. Johnson said that the company would be expanding into other states, and that the ideal store would be a 10,000-square-foot (930 m^{2}) location sited on a corner with 100 feet (30 m) of street frontage, dedicated parking, and upscale demographics. Johnson said that about 17 employees work at the average store.

In October 2009, the company opened its 100th store, a 10,000-square-foot location in Torrance, California; the second BevMo! store in that city. Torrance Mayor Frank Scotto was pleased; he said the chain's first store in Torrance was "a huge success" and that the new one would create jobs and bring in more sales tax. At that time, 90 of the chain's stores were in California, with the remaining 10 in Arizona. Johnson told reporters, "it took us 15 years to open the first 100, and we'll open the next 100 in the next five or six years." He said, "we know we can take our exact concept, like it is now, and do exactly what we're doing in at least 16 more states." By September 2013, expansion had reached into a third state, Washington, with eight stores in the Seattle-Tacoma area, plus one in Vancouver and one in Bellingham, bringing the total number of stores to 148.

Not all BevMo! expansion has been welcomed by city residents. In March 2010 in Santa Barbara, California, a group voiced opposition at a city board meeting, delaying approval of a BevMo! store. Concerns brought up at the meeting included complaints about the company's plans to cut down a tree in the parking lot, and about loading dock plans that would increase congestion in a narrow alley. The city's Architectural Board of Review member Paul Zink recommended against BevMo!'s plans to have pedestrians cross a parking lot to enter the store, saying that "there's a tie-in between what's inside and the street". Zink continued, "here in Santa Barbara, we like to window shop." Area retailers noted that a new liquor store within range of nine smaller liquor stores and several supermarkets that sell liquor would decrease sales for longstanding area businesses. Sarkis Abdulhi, a liquor store owner, asked, "how can a politician say they support small business when they bring in giant chains? How many employees are they going to have, 13? What good does that do anybody when they put nine or 10 small shops out of business?" Area resident Trudy Fernandez said the opening of chain location "takes away from what people like me who have been in Santa Barbara 40 years came here for. This is a small town—we don't want to be L.A." The store, BevMo's 105th, saw brisk business upon opening.

== In-house scoring ==
BevMo! employs Wilfred Wong, an expert taster and wine competition judge, who assigns bottles a wine rating based on his own version of Robert M. Parker, Jr.'s 50–100-point system. Wong, a veteran industry analyst and wine writer who has written regular columns for Vineyard & Winery Management magazine and Beverage Industry News, tastes some 8,000 bottles a year for BevMo!, and may taste 40 wines a day. A San Francisco native and resident who grew up working in his family's upscale grocery store in the Haight-Ashbury neighborhood, Wong was hired to work for BevMo! in 1995, when they had six stores. He told a New York Times reporter in 2006 that it can be tricky working as a wine critic inside a large retail chain that sells wine—there can be conflicts between appropriate scoring for a wine and business plans for that wine. He reported that he has, upon occasion, been encouraged by company management to give a high score to a wine, especially one that did not receive a high rating from other reviewers, or one that was purchased by BevMo! at a good price. Wong said, "we have fights all the time." Wong made assurances that he does not treat a wine to a good score based on company founders' wishes. Executive VP David Richards agrees: "If we were to impinge on Wilfred's credibility, it would be very bad for our brand." Wong reports only to Richards, to keep him from being influenced by wine sellers or BevMo!'s own buyers. Richards said, "we have to give him independence within the organization." Alder Yarrow, publisher of the wine blog Vinography.com, said of Wong, "he is not a shill ... He knows what he is talking about when it comes to wine." Professor Emeritus Robert Smiley, Director of Wine Studies, Graduate School of Management, University of California, Davis, said about Wong's ratings: "I think this is a good innovation and he's helpful to the consumer. It brings more people to BevMo and it probably moves them up in price because typically, the higher-price wines get the better scores." Smiley said that shoppers were too smart to be fooled: "If Wilfred and BevMo fix the ratings, people will catch on and go elsewhere."

In scoring, Wong uses a 100-point system that he developed before working for the large retailer. Wong reports that his system is aimed at the taste of the consumer rather than at that of the intellectual, unlike Parker's system which is more cerebral. One of the differences, said Wong, is that Parker may give a "fruitful" wine 88 points when Wong will give it 92, noting that it may be well-made for its varietal. He reports that he has only given two wines a score of 100, one a 1990 Montrachet from Domaine Ramonet-Prudhon and the other a late 1990s vintage from Opus One. His personal favorites to drink are French wines such as second- and third-growth Bordeaux reds, and California Pinot noir from the Russian River Valley. Other wines he likes include Chenin blanc from the Loire Valley, Pinot gris from Alsace, high-end Chardonnay from Australia and various biodynamic wines. Wong publishes his thoughts about wine regularly on "Wilfred's Blog", hosted on the company website; a forum that he uses to name his current favorites and to recommend wine and food pairings.

== Awards ==
- 2008 The Tasting Panel "Lifetime Achievement Award"
- 2006 Wine Enthusiast "Retailer of the Year"
