= Gopuff =

American digital delivery service

GoBrands, Inc.
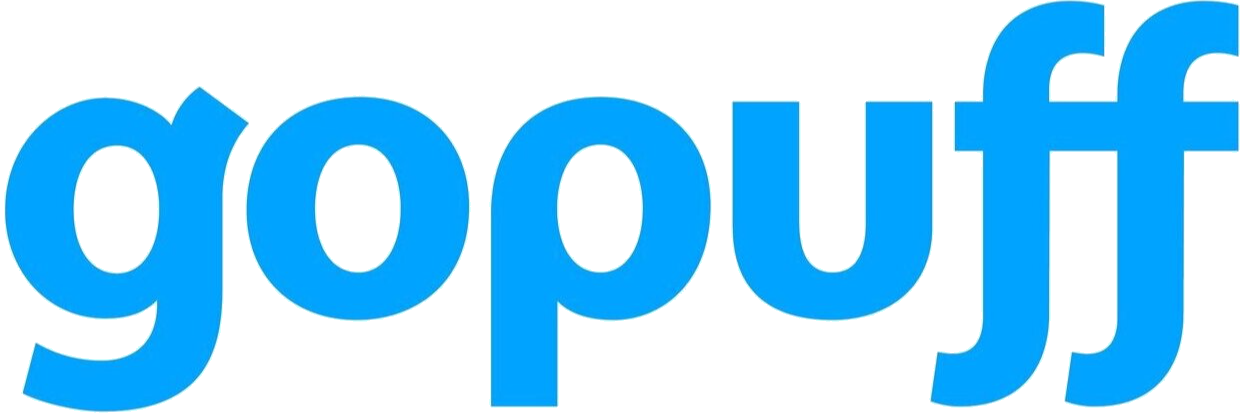
- Type: Private
- Industry: Online food ordering
- Founded: 2013; 13 years ago
- Founders: Yakir Gola; Rafael Ilishayev
- Headquarters: Philadelphia, Pennsylvania
- Area served: United States, United Kingdom
- Services: Online convenience delivery
- Revenue: ▼US$1.2 billion (2023)
- Number of employees: c. 5,000
- Subsidiaries: BevMo!
- Website: gopuff.com

GoBrands, Inc., doing business as Gopuff, is an American consumer goods and food delivery company headquartered in Philadelphia, Pennsylvania. The company delivers foods and goods typically found in convenience stores in more than 500 cities, suburbs, and towns across the United States as of 2025. It also operates in the United Kingdom, following an acquisition of Newcastle upon Tyne-based Fancy.

As of May 2024, the company was valued at $5.45 billion.

== History ==
Gopuff is headquartered in Philadelphia, Pennsylvania. The company was founded in 2013 by former Drexel University students Yakir Gola and Rafael Ilishayev, who bonded over their shared Jewish ancestries. Gopuff was originally an on-demand hookah supply delivery service, "an app service to deliver college students beer, condoms, junk food and other guilty pleasures", but expanded to delivering food and goods typically sold in convenience stores. The company began offering delivery services in Philadelphia before expanding into other cities, including New York, Chicago, Miami, and others.

In 2016, Gopuff raised $8.25 million in A round funding. In 2019, the company reportedly raised $750 million in funding from SoftBank, with a commitment for up to $250 million more. Also in 2019, Gopuff opened a new headquarters in the former Finnigan's Wake Pub ("once ranked among the top 25 douchiest bars in Philadelphia"), building in Northern Liberties.

In October 2020, the company announced that it had raised $380 million in a funding round led by Accel and D1 Capital Partners, bringing the company's total value to $3.9 billion. In November, Gopuff agreed to purchase BevMo! for $350 million. The alcoholic beverage chain has 161 stores in California, Washington and Arizona.

In March 2021, Gopuff announced that it had raised $1.15 billion in funding from investors including D1 Capital Partners, Fidelity Management and Research Company, and Luxor Capital. That month, it was listed on CNBC's Disruptor 50 list.

In April 2021, Gopuff added the first independent board member, Betsy Atkins, to its board.

In May 2021, Gopuff acquired Fancy, a UK-based food delivery service. Also in May, Gopuff and Uber Eats announced a partnership to sell products from Gopuff through the Uber Eats app.

In June 2021, Gopuff acquired Liquor Barn (liquorbarn.com), a Louisville, Kentucky-based alcoholic beverage retail chain, and announced the acquisition of RideOS for $115 million.

In February 2022, Gopuff signed a multi-year partnership deal with Formula 1 team McLaren.

== Challenges and layoffs ==
Gopuff has faced a significant decline since the COVID-19 pandemic, laying off a significant portion of its workforce in an attempt to be profitable, resulting in a significant decline in service quality.

In July 2022, Gopuff announced closure of 76 of its U.S. warehouses and layoffs impacting about 1,500 employees. At the time, the company still intended to expand services at other high-performing locations.

In October 2022, the company conducted more layoffs, firing some 250 employees.

In March 2023, Uber couriers were handling at least 4 percent of all Gopuff orders in the US to deal with a gap in the company's driver workforce. At this time, the two companies were also reported to be in talks for Gopuff orders to be placed through the Uber Eats app. Additionally in this time frame, Gopuff laid off 2% of its workforce, or about 100 employees.

In 2024, the company laid off about 600 employees, or about 6% of its global staff.

== Services and operation ==
Gopuff primarily delivers goods typically found in convenience stores such as snacks, drinks, and household goods. Beer, wine, and spirits are available for delivery in some markets. The company owns warehouses that stock many of the products it delivers.

In December 2015, Gopuff launched a beer delivery service called goBeer. In May 2016, they launched an alcohol delivery service called goBooze. These services are organized under the umbrella of goBrands Inc.

== Controversies and privacy issues ==
Gopuff has faced many significant controversies over the years, including accusations of misclassifying employees as independent contractors, violating labor laws, and selling alcohol to minors. These issues have led to fines, lawsuits, and the revocation of their alcohol delivery license in some areas.

In 2018, researchers from Northeastern University found that the Gopuff mobile app recorded user interactions that involved personal information, and transmitted the resulting video to a website affiliated with analytics company Appsee. Appsee criticized Gopuff for violating its terms of service. Gopuff stated that it would remove Appsee code from future versions of its iOS and Android apps, and amend its privacy policy to disclose possible data transfer to the app.

In 2021, GoPuff was accused of misclassifying its delivery drivers as independent contractors, preventing them from receiving benefits like minimum wage, overtime, and unemployment insurance. This misclassification has led to lawsuits and fines. In March 2023, Gopuff was fined $6.2 million by Massachusetts attorney general Andrea Campbell for misclassification of employees as independent contractors and other state labor law violations.

== Bibliography ==
- Weindling, Jacob (2017), Competition Runs Rampant in the On-Demand Economy, Paste Magazine, archived from the original on August 19, 2017
- Smother, Hannah (2017), This Online Service Is Basically Uber But For Plan B and Condoms, Cosmoplitan
- Goss, Scott (2017), goPuff, the Uber of munchies, rolls into Newark, Delaware Online
- O'Connor, Clare (2017), "Forbes 30 Under 30: Retail and Ecommerce", Forbes
- Burnley, Malcolm (2017), Can You Really Make a Billion Dollars Delivering Beer, Condoms, Rolling Papers and Nerds Ropes?, Philadelphia Magazine
- MacDonald, Tom (2017), GoPuff debuts new 30,000 SF Philadelphia headquarters, Philadelphia Business Journal
- Volkman, Elliot (2017), 9 Startup Mascots Building Stronger Brands, Tech Cocktail
- How Delivery Service goPuff Recreates the Impulse-Buy Experience Online, eMarketer, 2017
