= Logistics (film) =

2012 Swedish experimental art film

- Theatrical release poster
- Directed by: Erika Magnusson; Daniel Andersson
- Written by: Erika Magnusson; Daniel Andersson
- Produced by: Erika Magnusson; Daniel Andersson
- Release date: 1 December 2012 (Sweden)
- Running time: 51,420 minutes (857 hours; about 35.7 days)
- Country: Sweden

Logistics, or Logistics Art Project, is a 2012 Swedish experimental film conceived and created by Erika Magnusson and Daniel Andersson. At 51,420 minutes (857 hours or 35 days and 17 hours), it is the longest film ever made.

== Production ==
In 2008, Erika Magnusson and Daniel Andersson asked themselves where modern electronic gadgets come from. They conceived the idea to follow the production cycle of a pedometer in reverse chronological order from end sales back to its origin and manufacture. The route of the journey commenced in Stockholm, then proceeded through Insjön, Gothenburg, Bremerhaven, Rotterdam, Algeciras, Málaga, and finished in Shenzhen at the manufacturer in Bao'an. Funding was provided by the Innovativ Kultur Foundation and Kulturbryggan.

The project was filmed in real time during a trip to and in locations at a factory, following the route of the product's manufacture from the store in Stockholm where it was purchased to the factory in China where it was manufactured.

== Screening ==
The 51,420 minute (5-weeks long) film was first screened at Uppsala City Library from 1 December 2012 to 6 January 2013. It was then screened at The House of Culture, Stockholm, and had its world premiere at the 2014 Fringe Film Festival Shenzhen, as well as being streamed online.

== See also ==
- List of longest films
