= Eat (film) =

1964 silent film directed by Andy Warhol

- Directed by: Andy Warhol
- Starring: Robert Indiana
- Release date: July 16, 1964
- Running time: 45 minutes
- Country: United States
- Language: English

Eat (1964) is a 45-minute underground film created by Andy Warhol and featuring painter Robert Indiana, filmed on Sunday, February 2, 1964, in Indiana's studio. The film was first shown by Jonas Mekas on July 16, 1964, at the Washington Square Gallery at 530 West Broadway.

Eat is filmed in black-and-white film, has no soundtrack, and depicts fellow pop artist Indiana engaged in the process of eating a mushroom for the entire length of the film. Finally, there is a brief appearance by a cat.

In 1964, La Monte Young provided a loud minimalist drone soundtrack to Eat when shown as small TV-sized projections at the entrance lobby to the third New York Film Festival held at Lincoln Center.

== Plot ==
Indiana eats a mushroom, with a brief appearance from a cat.

== Cast ==
- Robert Indiana as the eating man.

== See also ==
- Andy Warhol filmography
- Blue Movie (1969) – Warhol film
- Kiss (1963) – Warhol film
- List of American films of 1963
- List of American films of 1964
- Sleep (1964) – Warhol film
