= Empire (1965 film) =

American underground film by Andy Warhol

- Still from the film
- Directed by: Andy Warhol; John Palmer
- Produced by: Andy Warhol
- Cinematography: Jonas Mekas
- Distributed by: Warhol Films
- Release date: March 6, 1965
- Running time: 485 minutes
- Country: United States
- Language: none

Empire is a 1965 American silent art film by Andy Warhol. When projected according to Warhol's specifications, it consists of eight hours and five minutes of slow motion black-and-white footage of an unchanging view of New York City's Empire State Building. The silent film does not have conventional narrative or characters, and largely reduces the experience of cinema to the passing of time. Warhol stated that the purpose of the film was "to see time go by."

A week after the film was shot, experimental filmmaker Jonas Mekas (who was cinematographer for Empire) speculated in the Village Voice that Warhol's film would have a profound influence on avant-garde cinema. In 2004, Empire was selected for preservation in the National Film Registry by the Library of Congress, who deemed it "culturally, historically, or aesthetically significant".

== Synopsis ==
Empire was filmed at 24 frames per second, and is meant to be seen in slow motion at 16 frames per second, extending its 6 1/2-hour runtime to 8 hours and 5 minutes. The film consists of a stationary view of the Empire State Building lasting the entirety of the running time. The film begins with a blank white screen, a result of the camera being calibrated for nighttime filming. As the sun sets almost imperceptibly, the figure of the building emerges and its details become clearer. As the sun sets further, the building is enveloped in darkness. The building's floodlights are turned on, illuminating its upper levels and spire. Lights in the windows of other structures go on and off. In the background, a beacon atop the Metropolitan Life Insurance Company tower flashes at intervals corresponding to every 15 minutes in real time (it flashes a single time every 15 minutes and at hour it flashes the time of day). Eventually, the floodlights go dark and the image in the remainder of the film is nearly total darkness. At three points in the film, the reflections of the crew, including Warhol, are seen in the windows of the Rockefeller Foundation office, where the work was filmed, as the office lights were not shut off before the crew started shooting after changing the film magazines.

== Production ==
The initial idea for Empire came from John Palmer, a young filmmaker affiliated with Jonas Mekas. Palmer had been sleeping occasionally on the roof of Mekas's Film Maker's Cooperative, which had an impressive view of the tower, only a few blocks away. He told Mekas that he thought an image of the floodlit building would make a good Warhol film, and Mekas passed the idea to Warhol. Around the time Warhol considered the idea, he had completed (in late 1963) his first extended-length film, the 5-hour Sleep, which shows multiple views of a man sleeping; Empire was his second long film.

In April 1964, the upper 30 floors of the Empire State Building were floodlighted for the first time in connection with the opening of the New York World's Fair in Queens. As the only floodlit skyscraper in New York City, the impact of the lighting was dramatic, with one person calling the tower's illuminated crown "a chandelier suspended in the sky". The floodlights were essential to Warhol's concept for the film, as there would be almost nothing to see without them.

For a shooting venue, Warhol made arrangements to use an office belonging to the Rockefeller Foundation on the 41st floor of the Time-Life Building at 51st Street and 6th Avenue. Cinematography took place overnight on July 24 and 25, 1964. Present for filming were Mekas, Warhol, Palmer, Gerard Malanga, Marie Desert (Mekas' girlfriend), and Henry Romney (of the Rockefeller Foundation). From the window at the northeast corner of 51st Street and 6th Avenue, the camera was pointed southeast toward the Empire State Building at 34th Street and 5th Avenue, taking in the Metropolitan Life Insurance Company tower with its blinking beacon at the corner of Madison Avenue and 24th Street, and the bulkier New York Life Insurance Company building at Madison Avenue and 26th Street.

In contrast to Warhol's earlier films, which had been shot with a Bolex camera limited to three minutes of shooting time, Empire was filmed on an Auricon camera that allowed for takes of around 33 minutes. In the Rockefeller Foundation office, Mekas framed the shot for Warhol's approval, and filming commenced at 8:06 pm, about ten minutes before sunset. Mekas' article about the shooting printed in the Village Voice the next week described a lighthearted night of filmmaking, with Warhol discoursing on the Empire State Building as the most prominent site in New York, visited by celebrities and tourists alike, and various people in the room imploring Warhol to pan the camera. Shooting wrapped at 2:42 a.m. the next day, with 654 feet of film exposed.

Empire was shot on ASA 400 Tri-X stock, which was developed as a negative rather than a reversal, and push-processed to ASA 1000 to compensate for the dark conditions of filming. The push-processing gives the film a graininess that calls attention to the medium of the film stock itself during projection in a manner that Douglas Crimp compared to the way that ink in Warhol's silkscreen paintings is present as both blobs of ink and as part of the image. Each reel contains a segment of film that was exposed to incidental light during processing, which may be evidence that the final work is unedited. The complete film consists of ten reels, each lasting approximately 48 minutes when projected in slow motion at 16 frames per second, as specified by Warhol.

After the film had been developed and printed, Warhol did not have funds to pay the processor, and Palmer arranged with his mother to make the payment. In recognition of his role in conceiving, assisting with and paying for the film, Warhol listed Palmer as co-director.

== Release ==
Empire premiered on March 6, 1965, at the City Hall Cinema in Manhattan, then the site of Mekas' Film-Makers' Cinematheque. Reporting on the premiere in his Village Voice column, Mekas claimed that after the film had been running for ten minutes, 30 or 40 people surrounded him and another staff member demanding their money back, "threatening to solve the question of the new vision and the new cinema by breaking chairs on our heads". According to Robert Fulford of the Toronto Daily Star, 80 people paid $2 per seat, and when they discovered it was "eight hours of film of the Empire State Building at night with no action except for the occasional light turning on or off," half demanded their money back, and one man called the police. When the cops came, they were disappointed because they suspected it was a "dirty" film. The angry individuals were refunded, but about ten people stayed for the entire film. "They talked to each other, drank beer, slept, and agreed it was a fine movie."

Gregory Battcock, a critic who was part of Warhol's circle and appears in several of his films, connected the film with other works by Warhol in terms of its focus on a subject that the viewer already generally knows. He argued this left space to emphasize other issues, particularly the physical medium of film, and the artistic use of long duration as a way of concentrating attention on these qualities. Battcock also observed that Empire had quickly become a classic of the avant-garde and promised to have great if unpredictable influence on the development of film.

In 1966, Warhol and his colleagues began producing events featuring rock band the Velvet Underground; these went by several names, ultimately becoming best known as the "Exploding Plastic Inevitable." In addition to the Velvet Underground, the Exploding Plastic Inevitables featured simultaneous mixes of strobe lights, dancers, colored slides and film projections. Advertisements for the events held in the spring of 1966 in New York's East Village mention Empire among other Warhol films to be screened.

== Legacy ==
By 1972, Warhol withdrew most of his film catalog, including Empire, from circulation. Film historian Callie Angell observed that the inaccessibility of the film until some years after Warhol's death in 1987, along with the assumption that a film such as Empire must be unwatchable, gave Empire a life mainly as an idea about a film that expressed Warhol's outrageousness as an artist, with some accounts lengthening it to 10 or 24 hours. In 1988, the film began to be screened again as part of the cataloging and restoration of Warhol's films undertaken by several institutions. In 1992, the original negative was rediscovered and used to make new prints of the film.

Mechanical projectors capable of showing the film at 16 frames per second have become rarer since the 1970s, with most current machines capable of a minimum speed of 18 frames per second; when projected at this rate, the film is about seven hours and 10 minutes long. Empire is distributed by the Museum of Modern Art's Circulating Film and Video Library.

== See also ==
- Andy Warhol filmography
- List of American films of 1965
- List of longest films

== Notes ==
=== Sources cited ===
- Angell, Callie (1994). "Guide to Empire" in The Films of Andy Warhol Part II (exhibition catalogue). New York: Whitney Museum of American Art.
- Angell, Callie (2006). Andy Warhol Screen Tests. New York: Harry N. Abrams. ISBN 9780810955394.
- Bourdon, David (1989). Warhol. New York: Abrams. ISBN 9780810917613.
- Crimp, Douglas (2012). "Our kind of movie": The Films of Andy Warhol. Cambridge, Mass.: MIT Press. ISBN 9780262017299.
- Watson, Steven (2003). Factory Made: Warhol and the Sixties. New York: Pantheon Books. ISBN 9780679423720.
