= Michael Acton Smith =

British app developer

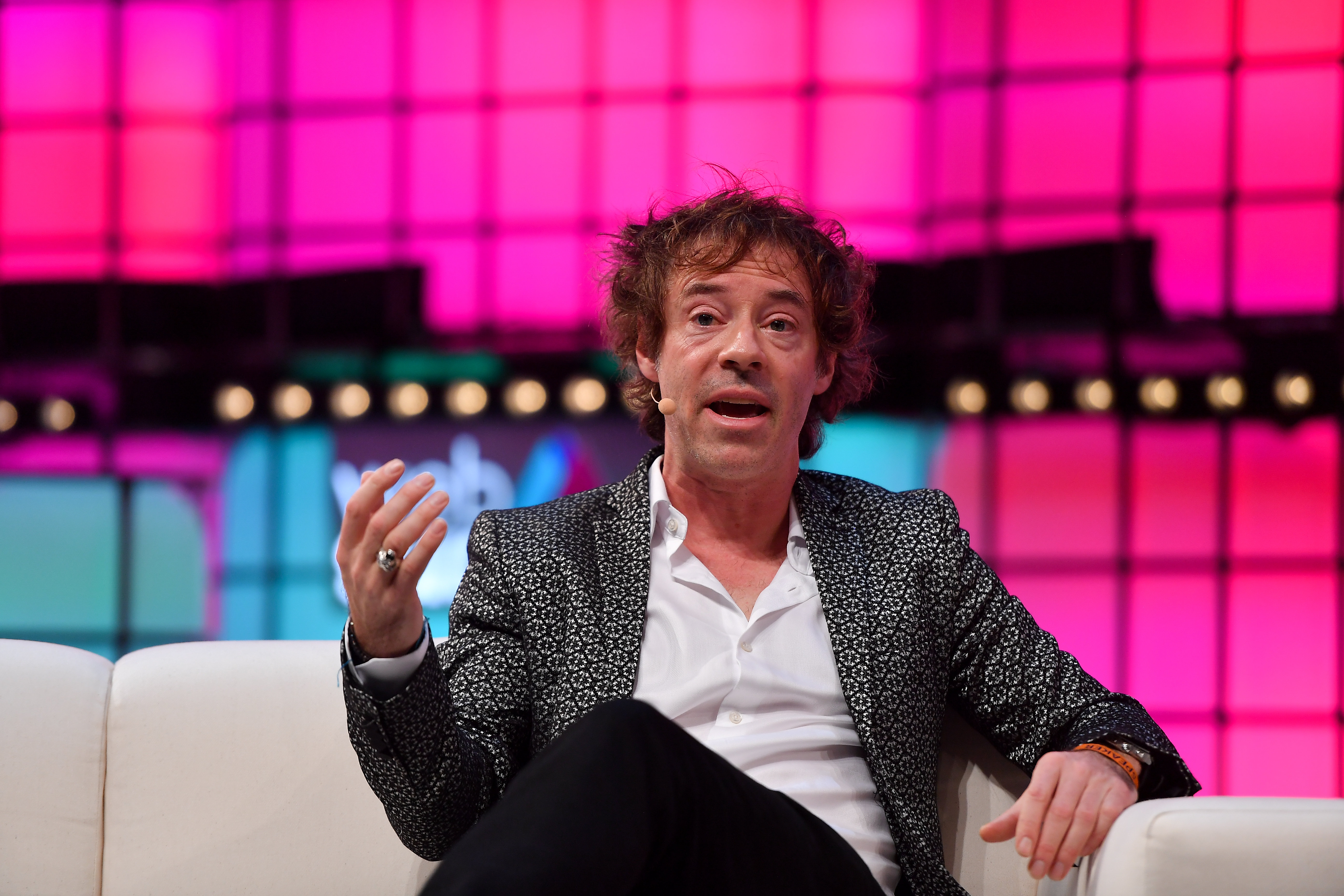
- Acton Smith in 2018
- Born: 3 September 1974 (age 52)
- Education: Birmingham University
- Occupations: Co-founder and co-CEO of Calm
- Known for: Founding Moshi Monsters
- Relatives: Anna Acton (sister)

Michael Acton Smith OBE (born 3 September 1974) is the co-CEO and co-founder of Calm, a meditation space company. He is also the founder of Firebox.com, and founder and chairman of children's entertainment company Mind Candy, which created the video game Moshi Monsters. He has been described by The Daily Telegraph as "a rock star version of Willy Wonka" and by The Independent as "a polite version of Bob Geldof."

== Education ==
Acton Smith attended Sir William Borlase's Grammar School in Marlow, Buckinghamshire. In 1996, he graduated from Birmingham University with a degree in geography.

== Career ==
Acton Smith joined the human resources department at Goldman Sachs after graduating in 1996. In 1998, he co-founded online gadget and gift retailer Firebox.com with Tom Boardman. In 2004, Firebox was listed on The Sunday Times' 'Fast Track 100' list of the fastest growing, privately owned business in the UK.

In 2004, Acton Smith secured $10M backing and launched Mind Candy. The company launched alternate reality game Perplex City, a global treasure hunt with £100,000 buried somewhere in the world that played out across various media including websites, text messages, magazines, live events, skywriting and multiple helicopters. The game was nominated for a BAFTA award in 2006. After three years (and $9M spent) Perplex City was placed on indefinite hold.

In 2007 Acton Smith launched online world Moshi Monsters. In 2013, it had over 90 million users around the world. The online world shut down in 2019. It has expanded offline into selling a range of products including toys, a kids magazine in the UK, a DS video game, a top 5 music album which has gone gold in the UK, books, membership cards, and trading cards. In December 2013, Moshi Monsters teamed with Universal to release a full-length feature movie.

In late 2012 Acton Smith co-founded Calm.com, along with Alex Tew. In 2013 the company announced a $450,000 funding round from a group of Angel investors. By 2015, Calm had reached 2 million downloads worldwide and, after winning a British competition, launched the world's first "slow TV Ad". That same year, Acton Smith released a book with Penguin called Calm: Calm the Mind, Change the World. It was published in 12 countries.

In July 2017, the release of Baa Baa Land, an eight-hour slow cinema film, was announced with Acton Smith as Executive Producer.

Acton Smith is also the founder of Ping Pong Fight Club, Silicon Drinkabout, and the Berwickstock Festival. He was awarded a BAFTA in 2013 for Moshi Monsters and was appointed Officer of the Order of the British Empire (OBE) in the 2014 New Year Honours for services to the creative industries.

== Personal life ==
His younger sister Anna is an actress.
