= Black White + Gray =

2007 documentary film

Black White + Gray: A Portrait of Sam Wagstaff and Robert Mapplethorpe
- Directed by: James Crump
- Written by: James Crump
- Produced by: James Crump; Stanley F. Buchthal; Maja Hoffmann; David Koh
- Starring: Sam Wagstaff; Robert Mapplethorpe; Patti Smith; Gordon Baldwin; Joan Juliet Buck; Dick Cavett; Dominick Dunne; Philippe Garner; Ralph Gibson; John Giorno; Timothy Greenfield-Sanders; John Richardson; Ingrid Sischy; Holly Solomon; John Szarkowski; Pierre Apraxine; Raymond Foye; Jeffrey Fraenkel; Tukey Koffend; Jean-Jacques Naudet; Eugenia Parry; Paul Walter; Clark Worswick
- Music by: J. Ralph
- Release dates: May 1, 2007 (Tribeca Film Festival); October 19, 2007 (United States)
- Running time: 77 minutes
- Country: United States
- Language: English

Black White + Gray: A Portrait of Sam Wagstaff and Robert Mapplethorpe is a 2007 American documentary film directed by James Crump. The film chronicles the symbiotic relationship between Sam Wagstaff, an American museum curator and collector of fine art, and Robert Mapplethorpe, the American fine art photographer whose controversial images were at the center of debate about public funding for the arts and the culture wars of the late 1980s. The film also explores the relationship both men shared with poet/musician Patti Smith in the New York art world of the 1970s.

== Reception ==
Stephen Holden of The New York Times reviewed Black White + Gray, calling it, "a potent exercise in art-world mythography that might be nicknamed 'The Prince and the Punk.'" Vince Aletti pronounced the film "fascinating" in The New Yorker's Critic's Notebook, writing "Savvy, charismatic, and devilishly handsome, Wagstaff found the perfect foil and goad in Mapplethorpe, but it was the collector, not the photographer, who left the most indelible and idiosyncratic mark on the medium they shared." James Christopher declared in The Times of London, "This is a terrific documentary by James Crump about the unsung collector, Wagstaff, and his lopsided relationship with his hungry young lover, Mapplethorpe." Writing for Crave, Sundance Fellow and film critic, Ernest Hardy pronounced, "Crump’s willingness to present a dissenting voice to what might otherwise come off as an almost fairy-tale pairing might seem an obvious directorial choice, but as documentaries slide more and more into blatant hagiography, it’s a relief to find a filmmaker inserting grainier perspectives for a grainier film." Philip Gefter, a biographer of Sam Wagstaff, wrote about the film for The New York Times in anticipation of its premiere at the Tribeca Film Festival.

The film has a score of 85% on Rotten Tomatoes.

== Release ==
The film premiered at the Tribeca Film Festival on May 1, 2007 and theatrically via Arthouse Films on October 19, 2007.
