= Antonio Lopez 1970: Sex Fashion & Disco =

- Theatrical poster for Antonio Lopez 1970: Sex Fashion & Disco
- Directed by: James Crump
- Written by: James Crump
- Produced by: James Crump; Ronnie Sassoon
- Starring: Joan Juliet Buck; Paul Caranicas; Michael Chow; Tina Chow; Pat Cleveland; Grace Coddington; Bob Colacello; Bill Cunningham; Patti D'Arbanville; Jane Forth; Jerry Hall; Charles James; Grace Jones; Donna Jordan; Karl Lagerfeld; Jessica Lange; Antonio Lopez; Juan Ramos; Yves Saint Laurent; Corey Tippin
- Cinematography: Robert O'Haire
- Edited by: Nick Tamburri
- Distributed by: Film Movement; Dogwoof
- Release dates: October 12, 2017 (BFI London Film Festival); September 14, 2018 (United States)
- Running time: 95 minutes
- Country: United States
- Language: English
- Box office: $73,122

Antonio Lopez 1970: Sex Fashion & Disco is a 2017 American documentary film directed by James Crump. This feature documentary concerns the Puerto Rican-born, Harlem and Bronx-raised fashion illustrator Antonio Lopez and his influential work and milieu in New York and Paris between 1968 and 1973. With original interviews and vintage footage, the film also features Lopez's personal partner and longtime creative collaborator, Juan Ramos, Bill Cunningham, Jessica Lange, Grace Jones, Bob Colacello, Grace Coddington, Yves Saint Laurent, Joan Juliet Buck and Karl Lagerfeld among numerous others.

The film was an Official Selection at many leading international film festivals including DOC NYC, The British Film Institute's BFI London Film Festival, International Documentary Film Festival Amsterdam, Seattle International Film Festival and Melbourne International Film Festival. It was nominated three times and awarded the Metropolis Grand Jury Prize at the 2017 DOC NYC Film Festival and the 2018 Cinémoi CinéFashion Film Award for Best Fashion Feature Film. The film qualified for consideration for the 2018 Academy Awards Oscar for Best Documentary Feature.

== Reception ==
Katie Walsh of Los Angeles Times declared the film "a warm remembrance of [Lopez’s] sensual spirit, and a celebration of his work, the film is also a vibrant period portrait of New York’s creative scenesters from a time when hippies cruised Central Park by day and the club Max’s Kansas City by night. While the film seeks to put [Lopez’s] name on the same level as the boldfaced names he rubbed elbows with, it is a stark, sorrowful reminder of the many artistic geniuses cut down in their prime by AIDS." Writing for The Hollywood Reporter, Vincent Boucher stated the film "vividly renders the look and feel of a bittersweet and all-too-brief era that would shape so much of the future of fashion…[it] pulsates with rare film clips and a seemingly endless trove of photographs, all set against the defining music of the time from the likes of Donna Summer, Isaac Hayes, Curtis Mayfield and Chic." In Film Journal, David Noh wrote that Lopez "is given his deserving due in this irresistibly seductive documentary, chronicling his inspirational—and very wild—life in the jungle of style. Addressing the latent racism that existed at the leading fashion magazines of the time and Lopez's efforts to bring inclusivity to the runway, Lauren Cochrane pointed out writing for The Guardian, London, Lopez "advocated diversity long before woke-ness was in fashion...If the dominant ideal of beauty in the 70s was a kind of athletic girl-next-door, epitomized by David Cameron favorite Cheryl Tiegs, Lopez championed something more unusual." In her review for Elephant Magazine (UK), Muriel Zagha wrote "Crump’s film persuasively suggests that Lopez was a revolutionary influence in fashion because of his awareness of ethnicity and unconventional, individual looks as beauty; not a widely shared point of view in those days."

Antonio Lopez 1970: Sex Fashion & Disco has a score of 92% on Rotten Tomatoes

== Release ==
The film is distributed in North America by Film Movement and internationally by Dogwoof, London. It premiered at the ICA, London October 12 at the 2017 BFI London Film Festival. It released theatrically in the United States at IFC Center, New York, September 14, 2018, Laemmle Theatres Royal Theatre, Los Angeles, September 21, 2018 and over twenty other major US markets The film became available on iTunes Store, Amazon Video and Vudu January 2019 and began airing on the premium cable and satellite television network Starz May 2019.
