= Joan Juliet Buck =

American writer and actress

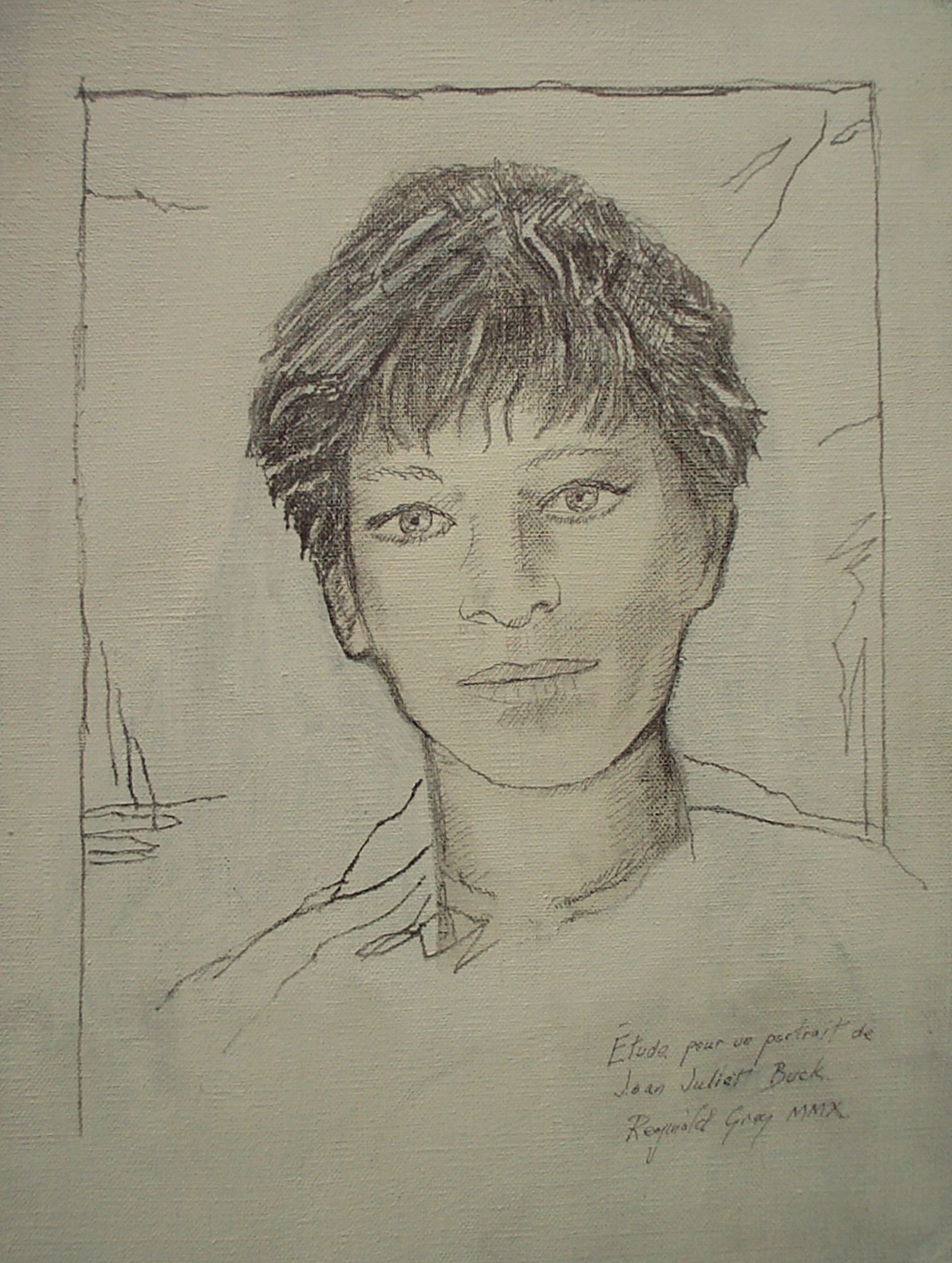
- Study for a portrait of Buck by Reginald Gray, Paris 1980s (graphite on canvas)
- Born: 1948 (age 77–78); Los Angeles, California, U.S.
- Occupations: Writer, editor, actress
- Spouse: John Heilpern (m. 1977; div. 1980)
- Writing career
- Years active: 1968–present

Joan Juliet Buck (born 1948) is an American writer and actress. She was the editor-in-chief of French Vogue from 1994 to 2001, the only American ever to have edited a French magazine. She was contributing editor to Vogue and Vanity Fair for many years. The author of two novels, she published a memoir, The Price of Illusion, in 2017. In 2020, she was nominated for the Pushcart Prize for her short story, “Corona Diary” which she began on Facebook.

In addition to having Substacks, Buck is a radio host.

== Early life and family ==
Born in 1948, she is the only child of Jules Buck (1917–2001), an American film producer, who moved his family to Europe in 1952 in reaction to the political repression in the United States at the time. Her mother, Joyce Ruth Getz (aka Joyce Gates, died 1996), was a child model and actress, and interior designer. Jules Buck served in the Signal Corps with John Huston, during the Second World War, and he subsequently served as a cameraman for the latter. Huston was the best man at her parents' 1945 wedding, and Joan Juliet learned to cook from Ricki Huston.

Buck grew up in Cannes, Paris, and London. As a teenager she met Tom Wolfe and became the subject of his piece, "The Life and Hard Times of a Teenage London Society Girl," which he republished in The Pump House Gang.

Buck's first language is French and she identifies as Jewish.

== Journalism career ==
=== United States and London, 1968-1994 ===
Buck dropped out of Sarah Lawrence College to work at Glamour magazine as a book reviewer in 1968. She became the London correspondent of Andy Warhol's Interview magazine, then the features editor of British Vogue at the age of 23, then a correspondent for Women's Wear Daily in London and Rome. Buck was an associate editor of the London Observer. From 1975 to 1976 she lived in Los Angeles to work on a novel.

A contributing editor to American Vogue from 1980 and also Vanity Fair, she also published profiles and essays in The New Yorker, Condé Nast Traveler, Travel + Leisure, and The Los Angeles Times Book Review.

As movie critic for American Vogue from 1990 to 1994, she served on the New York Film Festival selection committee the year its program included Chen Kaige's Farewell, My Concubine, Jane Campion's The Piano, and Robert Altman's Short Cuts.

=== French Vogue, 1994-2001 ===
She was French Vogue's editor-in-chief from 1994 to 2001, having initially refused the offer twice. The New York Times described her selection as indication that Condé Nast intended to "modernize the magazine and expand its scope" from its circulation of 80,000.

Buck replaced Helmut Newton with David LaChapelle and other young American photographers and hired American writers and tripled the text. Her first September cover was "La Femme Française," and she had a quantum physics-themed issue.

Buck doubled the magazine's circulation and produced thematic year-end issues on cinema, art, music, sex, and theater. Looking back she described what she envisioned for her employees then: "I wanted the magazine to be fun. I wanted everyone who worked on the magazine to go toward what they liked. Again, it’s that distinction between what you should do and what’s expected, and what you feel, what you want." In the Price of Illusion, she talks about wanting to upend French cliches such as black sweaters and Helmut Newton-referencing shoots; "French women know how to dress when they’re having sex. They need to know how to dress when they’re not having sex." Penelope Green of The New York Times wrote that Buck "upended what had been the magazine's rather staid coverage."

=== United States, 2003-present ===
Buck was TV critic for US Vogue from 2003 to 2011, also profiling cover subjects such as Marion Cotillard, Carey Mulligan, Natalie Portman, and Gisele Bündchen. She also penned profiles on the playwright Tom Stoppard and Carla Bruni-Sarkozy for the magazine. For Vanity Fair, she profiled people like Bernard-Henri Lévy and Mike Nichols. For the New Yorker her subjects included the actor Daniel Day-Lewis, chronicler of Russian émigrés in Paris Nina Berberova, and Princess Diana's relics post-death.

She has appeared in numerous documentaries, among them James Kent's Fashion Victim, the Killing of Gianni Versace, Mark Kidel's Paris Whorehouse and Architecture of the Imagination. Buck narrated James Crump's 2007 documentary Black, White + Gray, about art collector Sam Wagstaff and photographer Robert Mapplethorpe.

In the early 2010s, she wrote for T magazine, The New York Times's fashion magazine, W, and The Daily Beast, among others, and was the consulting editor to Dasha Zhukova's Garage magazine which The New York Times called "one of the most intriguing magazines to come along in years." Her humorous cultural pieces for T included subjects like the culture of high-end bedding and the cross-country tour of The Moth storytelling series, in which she participated in 2009 and 2012. For W she covered photographer Taryn Simon, the history of the social scene in Palm Springs, and the contemporary femme fatale.

Since 2015, her topics for Harper's Bazaar have included Patti Smith, the art of the retort, the mother she chose, dressing one's age, and her friendship with Leonard Cohen. She has also written for Air Mail on Australian photographer June Newton, Jacques Henri Lartigue, Jane Birkin, Richard Linklater, and Louis Malle. Buck has also penned articles on fashion for Homme Girls, and “A Bathing Suit is Not an Evening Dress” and the column "WTF with Joan Juliet Buck" for the Italian weekly Grazia.

== Asma al-Assad article ==
In its March 2011 issue, Vogue published Buck's profile on Asma al-Assad, wife of Syrian President Bashar al-Assad, describing her as "glamorous, young and very chic—the freshest and most magnetic of first ladies. Her style is not the couture-and-bling dazzle of Middle Eastern power but a deliberate lack of adornment. She's a rare combination: a thin, long-limbed beauty with a trained analytic mind who dresses with cunning understatement." The piece was strongly criticized in the US media as reports of al-Assad's violent repression began to emerge in mid-March. In April, former Atlantic writer-editor Max Fisher attacked it as an ill-timed "puff piece." The Washington Post's Paul Farhi wrote, "It may have been the worst-timed, and most tin-eared, magazine article in decades." "It seems that Ms. Buck's aim was more public relations spin than reportage,” wrote Bari Weiss and David Feith in The Wall Street Journal.

Although it acknowledged that the article had taken "more than a year" to cultivate, Vogue removed it from its website in May 2011. The New York Times subsequently reported that the Assad "family paid the Washington public relations firm Brown Lloyd James $5,000 a month to act as a liaison between Vogue and the first lady, according to the firm."

In The Washington Post, Jennifer Rubin also wrote: "It was the Washington liberal foreign policy community that, for years, had fancied Bashar al-Assad as a constructive player in the Middle East." Quoting Lee Smith, Rubin pointed out that John Kerry, Teresa Heinz, and James A. Baker, among others, courted Assad in an attempt to sway him from Iran. "American liberals and Republican realpolitikers were every bit as sycophantic and deluded as Buck," she wrote. Buck's contract with Vogue, however, was not renewed. In May 2022, in a business article for Washington Post about a new Anna Wintour biography, Bloomberg's Adrian Wooldridge wrote that Wintour's decision to commission the piece "went against stiff internal opposition" and that it was Buck, "a Wintour friend," as the author of the piece, "who got the chop."

Buck subsequently wrote in Newsweek that she had not wanted to write the story, and the explanation generated controversy. In The Guardian, Homa Khaleeli wrote, "It's hard to tell if Buck asked Asma—or Bashar whom she also met—any real questions at all." The Vogue article was satirized in The Philadelphia Inquirer, and it was republished in Gawker in September 2013.

Six years later, Buck recalled that she was "tainted, like a leper" and that "There was so much opprobrium sticking to me. I was so flayed. My life as I knew it had vanished." Will Pavia of The Times later wrote that the magazine "left Buck twisting in the wind.... It's hard not to think that Wintour contributed to Buck's woes."

== Performance ==
As a child, Buck was cast as a Scots waif in the Walt Disney film Greyfriars Bobby.

Buck began studying acting in 2002, and appears in a supporting role in Nora Ephron's 2009 movie Julie & Julia as Madame Elisabeth Brassart, head of the famed Le Cordon Bleu cooking school. She wrote about the experience of auditioning for Ephron after the latter passed away in June 2012.

In 2009, she appeared in an action theater piece during Performa09 at New York City's White Slab Palace. Curated by Michael Portnoy and Sarina Basta, Buck and another actor held a conversation guided by a third actor's random flashing of prompt cards.

In 2010, Buck played Mrs. Prest in an adaptation of The Aspern Papers, a Henry James novella, directed by first-time filmmaker Mariana Hellmund. She played Marguerite Duras in Irina Brook's La Vie matérielle that spring and again in 2013 at La MaMa E.T.C. theater in New York City alongside Deadwood's Nicole Ansari.

In May 2012, Buck appeared with comedian Eugene Mirman, performers Ira Glass, Lucy Wainwright Roche, and Amber Tamblyn in a night of interpretations of the Joan of Arc narrative at the Littlefield, a Brooklyn performance space. In 2015, Buck appeared in the Supergirl episode "Red Faced," playing Katherine Grant, the mother of CatCo founder Cat Grant.

In February 2017, she appeared in a production of 18th-century playwright Pierre de Marivaux's The Constant Players at the Henry Clay Frick House in New York, directed by Mériam Korichi. The next month she was in a Columbia Stages production of Isak Dinesen's Babette's Feast in the East Village, adapted and directed by Pálína Jónsdóttir.

In March 2026, she performed in Swiss theater director Milo Rau and Servane Dècle's U.S. premiere of the Pelicot Trial at Judson Memorial Church with Ellen Barkin, V (formerly known as Eve Ensler), former U.S. Solicitor General Neal Kumar Katyal , and Laila Robins.

== Novels and adaptations ==
Buck's two novels about multicultural expatriates are The Only Place To Be, published by Random House in 1982, and Daughter of the Swan, published by Weidenfeld & Nicolson in 1987. She was one of a long line of writers commissioned to adapt, for film, D. M. Thomas's novel The White Hotel. Her version was singled out by Thomas as "faithful and intelligent" among versions that included ones by the writer himself and Dennis Potter, but the film has never been made.

In 2009, the story "The Ghost of the Rue Jacob" was a big hit at The Moth. In February 2012, Buck went on "The Unchained Tour of Georgia" headed by George Green on a remodeled 1975 Bluebird schoolbus funded by Kickstarter.

== The Price of Illusion and other work ==
In March, 2017, Buck published The Price of Illusion, her memoir of her life in Paris, Milan, Los Angeles, New York, London and Santa Fe from the '60s through the '90s. It was reviewed favorably by The New York Times, People, Entertainment Weekly, USA Today, among other places, and was an Amazon Editors' Pick and an "Oprah Pick". It was also a starred Publishers Weekly review, and Kirkus Reviews described it as “relentlessly candid and often absorbing account of a complex life spent in and out of the fashion spotlight."

The memoir was excerpted in New York magazine in February 2017 and published in paperback in November 2017.

In 2020, Buck contributed “Corona Diary,” her missives on Facebook, to the literary magazine Stat o Rec's anthology, Writing the Virus. It was nominated for the 2021 Pushcart Prize.

In 2021 she started to broadcast "Companion Fog" on Radio Free Rhinecliff, a novella about a custom-made cloud one could have to protect one from bad news. "Serial Tales," set in Littleburg in the Hudson Valley, followed weekly in 2022.

In April 2024 Buck started her Substack, "Everyday Until I Die" which now has 52 entries. Also through Radio Free Rhinecliff, Buck helms the podcast Joan of Art where she has interviewed Michael Lindsay-Hogg, Molly Crabapple, Ian Buruma, Laura Day, Griffin Dunne, George Green, John Patrick Shanley, and Joan Tewkesbury.

== Personal life ==
In 1977, Buck married John Heilpern, an English journalist and writer; they divorced in the 1980s. She currently lives in Rhinebeck, New York, keeping a part of her 7,000-volume library in storage in Poughkeepsie.

She was seated at a 2026 Celine fashion show along with actresses Sarah Paulson, Naomi Watts, and Tracee Ellis Ross which was noted by the New York Times as well as the selfie she posted prior to arriving. Buck shared “I think we’re like old stone houses. We have the value of antiquity. If you haven’t tweaked yourself, it’s like you have a working fireplace that’s been going since 1680. We’re authentic.”

== Works ==
=== Novels ===
- The Only Place to Be, New York: Random House, 1982
- Daughter Of The Swan, New York: Weidenfeld, 1987

=== Non-fiction ===
- The Price of Illusion, New York: Altria Books, 2017

== Acting ==
Film and television
Year	Title	Role	Notes
1961	Greyfriars Bobby	Ailie	
2009	Julie & Julia	Madame Elisabeth Brassart	
2010	The Aspern Papers	Mrs. Prest	
2015	Supergirl	Katherine Grant	Episode: "Red Faced"

Theater
Year	Play	Role	Notes
2009	Action theater piece	Ensemble	White Slab Palace, Performa 09
2010	La Vie matérielle	Marguerite Duras	
2013	La Vie matérielle	Marguerite Duras	La MaMa E.T.C. theater
2017	The Constant Players	Ensemble	Henry Clay Frick House
2017	Babette's Feast	Narrator (16 characters)	Connelly Theater

Media offices
Preceded by Colombe Pringle	Editor-in-Chief of Vogue Paris; 1994–2001	Succeeded by Carine Roitfeld
