= Spit Earth: Who Is Jordan Wolfson? =

2007 documentary film

- Directed by: James Crump
- Written by: James Crump
- Produced by: Ronnie Sassoon; James Crump
- Starring: Jordan Wolfson; Jeremy O. Harris; Jeff Koons; Andrianna Campbell; Jeffrey Deitch; Jack Bankowsky; Erica Jong; Stefan Kalmár
- Release date: May 1, 2020 (online)
- Running time: 55 minutes
- Country: United States
- Language: English

Spit Earth: Who Is Jordan Wolfson? is a 2020 American documentary film directed by James Crump on American contemporary artist, Jordan Wolfson. In addition to Wolfson himself, the film features an array of voices assessing Wolfson’s life and contemporary art practice, including playwright Jeremy O. Harris, artist Jeff Koons, the art world impresario and gallerist Jeffrey Deitch and curator and art historian Andrianna Campbell, among others.

== Reception ==
Kenny Schachter of Artnet News declared the film a "searing psychological portrait.” Writing for ARTnews, Christian Lorentzen noted that “Wolfson comes across less as a provocateur than as a sophisticated and entertaining nostalgia act, repackaging familiar transgressions in novel trappings like animatronics and virtual-reality headsets…but his days as an enfant terrible are behind him. Spit Earth serves as a capstone to that phase.” Calling it “a spicy little film, its interviews edited into whiplash pronouncements from art critics [and] dealers,” Hettie Judah, writing for i (newspaper), however noted that “all the conflict and revelations certainly make Spit Earth entertaining viewing, but as a character study it risks reducing the work to little more than a psychological access point: shrinking the art to fit the artist.” Writing for Dazed, Ashleigh Kane observed that “while Spit Earth doesn’t arrive at any solid conclusions, the various experiences and opinions shared in the film open even more questions around Wolfson’s character, and, in turn, his work.”

Nate Freeman of Artnet News wrote, “sources say the subject is not pleased with the final product—nor are some of the other interviewees” in part due to interviews they believe are taken out of context. As per another news story, the documentary recounts the un-permitted usage of an image of Wolfson’s ex, Emma Fernberger, who following the release of the film, “said that it was shown with her consent.”

== Release ==
The film was an official selection of the 2020 Festival International du Livres d’Art et du Film, Perpignan, France and the 2020 Lo schermo dell’arte Film Festival, Florence, Italy. Due to the Impact of the COVID-19 pandemic on cinema, the film was released worldwide May 1, 2020 on the leading streaming platforms.
