= Upadhya =

Upadhya is a surname. Notable people with the surname include:

- Mayuri Upadhya (born 1979), Indian choreographer
- Shail Upadhya (1935–2013), Nepalese diplomat
