= Bill Cunningham New York =

- Directed by: Richard Press
- Produced by: Philip Gefter
- Starring: Bill Cunningham
- Cinematography: Tony Cenicola; Richard Press
- Edited by: Ryan Denmark
- Production company: First Thought Films
- Distributed by: Zeitgeist Films
- Release dates: March 24, 2010 (New Directors/New Films); March 16, 2011 (United States)
- Running time: 84 minutes
- Country: United States
- Language: English

Bill Cunningham New York is a 2010 American documentary film directed by Richard Press and produced by Philip Gefter. Bill Cunningham New York is distributed by Zeitgeist Films and was released in theaters on March 16, 2011.

== Synopsis ==
"We all get dressed for Bill", says Vogue editor Anna Wintour. The Bill in question is The New York Times photographer Bill Cunningham. For decades, this Schwinn-riding cultural anthropologist has been obsessively and inventively chronicling fashion trends and high-society charity soirées for the Times's Style section in his columns "On the Street" and "Evening Hours".

Full of uptown fixtures (such as Wintour, Tom Wolfe, Brooke Astor, David Rockefeller—who all appear in the film), downtown eccentrics and everyone in between, Cunningham's enormous body of work documents its time and place as well as individual flair. Bill Cunningham New York portrays the man at work (on the street and at the office) and at home (a Carnegie Hall studio).

== Cast ==
- Bill Cunningham
- Editta Sherman
- Carmen Dell'Orefice
- Annette de la Renta
- Anna Wintour
- Iris Apfel
- Shail Upadhya
- Kim Hastreiter
- Thelma Golden
- Tom Wolfe
- Brooke Astor
- Mike Wallace
- Michael Bloomberg
- Catherine Deneuve
- Anna Piaggi
- Michael Kors
- Arthur Ochs Sulzberger, Jr.

== Awards ==
- 2010: Opening Night Film New Directors/New Films Festival
- 2010: Won Audience Award for Best Documentary Film at Sydney Film Festival
- 2010: Won Best Documentary at Nantucket Film Festival
- 2010: Won Best Documentary Audience Award at Melbourne International Film Festival
- 2010: Won Best Documentary at Abu Dhabi Film Festival

== Release ==
Bill Cunningham New York played at New York City's Film Forum from March 16 to 29, 2011, before opening in theaters in a limited release around the United States.

== Reviews ==
The film was critically well-received, garnering a 99% approval rating on movie review aggregator Rotten Tomatoes. The Hollywood Reporter described Bill Cunningham New York as a "Fascinating doc about a photographer surveying the highs and lows of New York society." New York Magazine chose Bill Cunningham New York as one of their Critics' Picks. Roger Ebert gave the film four out of four stars, writing "This movie made me happy every moment I was watching it." The film received a score of 76 on the aggregate website Metacritic indicating "generally favorable" reviews.
