= Troublemakers (2015 film) =

Troublemakers: The Story of Land Art
- Directed by: James Crump
- Written by: James Crump
- Produced by: James Crump; Ronnie Sassoon; Farley Ziegler; Michel Comte
- Starring: Vito Acconci; Carl Andre; Germano Celant; Paula Cooper; Walter De Maria; Virginia Dwan; Gianfranco Gorgoni; Michael Heizer; Nancy Holt; Dennis Oppenheim; Charles Ross; Pamela Sharp; Willoughby Sharp; Robert Smithson; Harald Szeemann; Lawrence Weiner
- Cinematography: Alexandre Themistocleous; Robert O'Haire
- Edited by: Nick Tamburri
- Distributed by: First Run Features
- Release dates: October 1, 2015 (New York Film Festival); January 8, 2016 (United States)
- Running time: 72 minutes
- Country: United States
- Language: English
- Box office: $38,571

Troublemakers: The Story of Land Art is a 2015 American documentary film directed by James Crump. Troublemakers chronicles the history of land art in the 1960s and 1970s, when a group of radical New York artists began producing earthworks on a monumental scale in the desert spaces of the American southwest. The film follows the careers of artists who use the earth itself as their primary medium, including Robert Smithson (Spiral Jetty), Walter De Maria (The Lightning Field) and Michael Heizer (Double Negative).

== Reception ==
Eric Gibson of The Wall Street Journal gave the film a positive review, writing, "A film that takes its place among the great art documentaries of the past half-century... filled with great moments, large and small... deftly captures the madcap ambition, grandeur and even sublimity of the works these artists created." Glenn Kenny of The New York Times in a NYT Critics' Pick called it a "thrilling documentary," writing "The film’s generous views of spectacular works like Smithson’s monumental (Spiral Jetty) (the work projects into the Great Salt Lake in Utah) and Mr. Heizer’s (Double Negative) in Nevada (a huge trench bisected by a canyon) are best seen on the largest screen available." John DeFore of The Hollywood Reporter called the film "a colorful and sometimes gorgeous primer on this influential moment." Jordan Hoffman, writing for The Guardian of London proclaimed "Forget Dawn of Justice – this is the best superhero team-up we’ll see at the cinema this year." Writing for The Huffington Post, Patricia Zohn declared Troublemakers "does something that is rare for art documentaries: It is very beautiful and dynamic itself in examining work that is challenging. It meets the subject head-on."

Troublemakers has a score of 94% on Rotten Tomatoes and 65% on Metacritic.

== Release ==
The film premiered at the 2015 New York Film Festival on October 1, 2015, and released theatrically on January 8, 2016, via First Run Features.
