= Robert Mapplethorpe (Warhol) =

1983 painting by Andy Warhol

- Artist: Andy Warhol
- Year: 1983
- Medium: Acrylic and silkscreen ink on canvas
- Movement: Pop Art
- Subject: Robert Mapplethorpe
- Dimensions: 102 cm × 102 cm (40 in × 40 in)

Robert Mapplethorpe is a 1983 portrait painting by American artist Andy Warhol. Executed in acrylic paint and silkscreen ink on canvas, it depicts photographer Robert Mapplethorpe. Both renowned for their portraiture, Warhol and Mapplethorpe explored similar themes of identity, sexuality, and beauty. In 1983, they produced portraits of one another, with Mapplethorpe photographing Warhol and Warhol creating a series of silkscreen portraits of Mapplethorpe in several compositional variations.

== Background ==
Pop artist Andy Warhol and photographer Robert Mapplethorpe moved in overlapping New York social circles and had been acquainted since the early 1970s. In her memoir Just Kids (2010), Mapplethorpe's former girlfriend Patti Smith recalled that he regarded Warhol and French artist Marcel Duchamp "as models." Mapplethorpe was deeply upset when Warhol was shot by radical feminist Valerie Solanas in 1968. Smith said, "He loved Andy Warhol and considered him our most important living artist. It was as close to hero worship as he ever got. He respected artists like Cocteau and Pasolini, who merged life and art, but for Robert, the most interesting of them was Andy Warhol documenting the human mise-en-scène in his silver-lined Factory."

Shortly after they moved into the Hotel Chelsea in 1969, Smith obtained a used copy of Andy Warhol's Index (Book) (1967) for Mapplethorpe. Although he admired its inventive foldouts and pop-up elements, he was frustrated because he was designing a similar artist's book. According to Smith, Mapplethorpe believed he and Warhol were on "parallel paths" and remarked, "It's good... But mine will be better."

Before establishing himself as a photographer, Mapplethorpe designed jewelry from found objects that was modeled and by friends connected to Warhol's circle. His pieces were worn by Ultra Violet in a 1970 New York magazine fashion feature, by Jay Johnson, twin brother of Warhol's longtime partner Jed Johnson, and by Joe Dallesandro in a 1971 fashion editorial photographed by Bill King.

Mapplethorpe's attitude toward Warhol evolved from "adulation to competitiveness." He had initially hoped to become Warhol's friend or protégé, but eventually became wary of him. Warhol, in turn, had reservations about Mapplethorpe, who rarely spoke in his presence. As Bob Colacello recalled in Holy Terror: Andy Warhol Close Up (1990): "Robert told me that he was afraid that Andy would steal his art ideas, 'like he did with Brigid.' Of course, some would say, Robert's early mix of photography and painting derived directly from Andy." In May 1972, Mapplethorpe accompanied Warhol and Colacello to watch ballet dancer Rudolf Nureyev rehearse with the Royal Ballet at Lincoln Center. Warhol and Mapplethorpe took dueling photographs of Nureyev with Polaroid cameras, which Nureyev proceeded to tear up. Colacello later described the encounter as a "triple ego war."

In 1973, Mapplethorpe's Polaroids were exhibited alongside the work of Warhol and Brigid Polk at New York's Gotham Book Mart. Mapplethorpe and Warhol continued to socialize with one another throughout the decade, and Mapplethorpe contributed photographs to Warhol's Interview magazine.

By the 1980s, they had become two of the leading portrait artists of their generation, working primarily in painting and photography, respectively. Curator Patricia Hickson observed that both artists "lived in this world of gender fluidity" and explored many of the same subjects despite their differing artistic practices. A postcard sent by Mapplethorpe to Warhol in 1982 refers to a discussion concerning costume and drag. In 1983, they produced portraits of one another, with Mapplethorpe photographing Warhol and Warhol creating a silkscreen portrait of Mapplethorpe.

In 1984, Warhol visited Mapplethorpe's Bond Street studio for an Interview photoshoot featuring singer Grace Jones, who was painted by artist Keith Haring. Mapplethorpe photographed Warhol again in 1986, and following Warhol's death in 1987, he photographed the artist's Upper East Side townhouse and extensive collection for House & Garden magazine.

== Production ==
For portrait commissions such as Robert Mapplethorpe, Warhol typically photographed the sitter using a Polaroid Big Shot camera, taking dozens of instant photographs during a session. From these, he selected several test images before choosing one or two to serve as the basis for the final 40 × 40-inch (102 × 102 cm) silkscreen portraits, the standard format for his portraits.

After selecting the image, Warhol enlarged the Polaroid and transferred its outline onto a primed canvas. He then applied areas of acrylic color before placing a large silkscreen over the canvas and printing the photographic image in black silkscreen ink, allowing the portrait to emerge through the combination of painted color and photographic reproduction.

== Description ==
Executed in acrylic paint and silkscreen ink on canvas, Robert Mapplethorpe depicts the photographer in a tightly cropped frontal composition characteristic of Warhol's portrait paintings. Mapplethorpe is shown with his hair slicked back into a pompadour, wearing a black leather jacket, and white shirt, looking directly at the viewer against a saturated red background. The portrait closely resembles several self-portraits Mapplethorpe made in the early 1980s, in which he adopted a punk-inspired persona. Warhol produced several painted variations of Mapplethorpe's likeness, including black-and-white "double-face" and "triple-face" compositions in which the portrait is superimposed.

== Interpretation ==
Curator Patricia Hickson compared the portrait with Mapplethorpe's 1986 photographic portrait of Warhol, noting both "are head shots; both men gaze directly at the viewer. Mapplethorpe placed Warhol's face in the center of a cruciform frame and encircled his head with a saintly glow, while Warhol saturated Mapplethorpe's image in a deep, devilish red."

== Exhibitions ==
Robert Mapplethorpe was displayed alongside Mapplethorpe's photographic portrait of Warhol in the exhibition Warhol & Mapplethorpe: Guise & Dolls at the Wadsworth Atheneum Museum of Art in Hartford from December 2015 to January 2016.

== Collections ==
Mapplethorpe owned a black-and-white "double-face" portrait of himself, which Hickson described as "the ultimate symbol of his success." Following his death in 1989, the painting was sold at Christie's and was resold there for $396,800 in November 2006.

Versions of Robert Mapplethorpe are held in the collections of several major museums. Black-and-white examples are in the collections of the Tate in London and the National Galleries of Scotland in Edinburgh. A black-and-white triple-image version is in the collection of the San Francisco Museum of Modern Art as part of the Doris and Donald Fisher Collection.
