= Shail Upadhya =

Nepalese fashion designer

- Born: 9 August 1935; Nepal
- Died: 31 January 2013 (aged 77); New York City
- Occupation: Nepalese fashion designer

Shail Upadhya (1935 – 2013) was a Nepalese diplomat, United Nations disarmament expert and fashion designer.

== Career ==
As a second career, Upadhya worked as a fashion designer, becoming a social fixture in New York City, known for his flamboyant and colorful suits and outfits. He was a prominent presence in the 2011 documentary film Bill Cunningham New York, about New York Times fashion photographer Bill Cunningham. He lived in New York City, Southampton, New York, and Miami, Florida.

Upadhya was interviewed on Da Ali G Show by Sacha Baron Cohen's character Brüno at New York Fashion Week.
