= Andrianna Campbell-Lafleur =

American art critic, curator, and historian

Andrianna Campbell-Lafleur (née Campbell) is a historian, art critic, and curator specializing in modern and contemporary art.

== Early life and education ==
Campbell-Lafleur studied at the Rhode Island School of Design (RISD), where she received her BFA degree in printmaking in 2001. While at RISD, the RISD Museum awarded her a Andrew Mellon Fellowship. She then worked on the curatorial team at Forbes, where she managed an international art collection. She received a doctorate from the Department of Art History at the Graduate Center, CUNY in 2020, with her research focused on the artist Norman Lewis and Abstract Expressionism.

== Career ==
Campbell-Lafleur has authored essays on contemporary art for Artforum, Art in America, and frieze. In 2016, she co-edited an edition of the International Review of African American Art dedicated to Norman Lewis. She is also a founding editor of apricota, a journal focused on art writing and history, alongside Joanna Fiduccia.

Following the election of President Donald Trump in November 2016, Campbell-Lafleur collaborated with MoveOn.org to encourage artists to protest by creating graphics, signs, and slogans to support the 2017 Women's March and, in her own words, "promote positive change, not perpetuate the negative rhetoric coming from the President-elect."

In October 2017, Campbell-Lafleur opened a pop-up shop named Anger Management inside of the Brooklyn Museum, with visual artist Marilyn Minter. The shop aimed to serve as an outlet of protest for more than 70 artists, of which Campbell-Lafleur and Minter recruited as vendors for the shop. Its proceeds would be distributed between Planned Parenthood, the American Civil Liberties Union, or a different charity of artists's choice. Discussing the show, Campbell-Lafleur commented that "circulating images, like those created by the Anger Management vendors, contributes to a feeling of solidarity".

== See also ==
- Women in the art history field
