= Robert Mapplethorpe =

American photographer (1946–1989)

- Self-Portrait, 1980
- Born: Robert Michael Mapplethorpe; November 4, 1946; Queens, New York City, U.S.
- Died: March 9, 1989 (aged 42); Boston, Massachusetts, U.S.
- Resting place: St. John Cemetery, Queens, New York City
- Education: Pratt Institute
- Known for: Photography
- Partner(s): Patti Smith (1967–1970); David Croland (1970–1972); Sam Wagstaff (1972–1977); Jack Fritscher (1977–1980); Milton Moore (1980–1982); Jack Walls (1982–1989)
- Website: mapplethorpe.org

Robert Michael Mapplethorpe (/ˈmeɪpəlˌθɔːrp/ MAY-pəl-thorp; November 4, 1946 – March 9, 1989) was an American photographer and artist. Best known for his black-and-white photographs, his work encompassed celebrity portraits, self-portraits, erotic photographs, and still lifes of flowers.

Mapplethorpe initially worked in collages, sculpture, and jewelry design, incorporating photography into his collages before adopting it as his primary medium. During the 1970s, he became known for photographs documenting New York City's gay male BDSM subculture, while his portraits brought together subjects from different social and cultural circles. He continued to work until his death from AIDS-related complications in 1989.

His posthumous exhibition The Perfect Moment in 1989 became the focus of a national controversy over public funding for the arts, censorship, and the legal treatment of sexually explicit imagery. The controversy contributed to broader debates in the United States over artistic freedom.

Mapplethorpe's photographs are held in the collections of major museums, including the Metropolitan Museum of Art, Museum of Modern Art in New York, and the J. Paul Getty Museum. His life and work were the subject of the 2016 documentary film Mapplethorpe: Look at the Pictures (2016) and the biographical film Mapplethorpe (2018).

== Early life and education ==
=== Childhood ===
Mapplethorpe was born on November 4, 1946 at Irwin Sanitarium in Hollis, Queens. His mother Joan Dorothy "Maxey" belonged to the Rosary Society and a bowling league and his father Harry Irving Mapplethorpe, an electrical engineer, worked at Underwriters Laboratories. He was of English, Irish, and German descent and grew up as a Catholic.

As a child, his family moved to the Floral Park neighborhood of Queens. The third of six children, he had three brothers and two sisters. One of his brothers, Edward Mapplethorpe, later worked for him as an assistant and became a photographer as well.

Mapplethorpe attended Martin Van Buren High School, where he graduated in 1963. That summer, he worked as a messenger at National City Bank.

=== Pratt Institute and early art ===
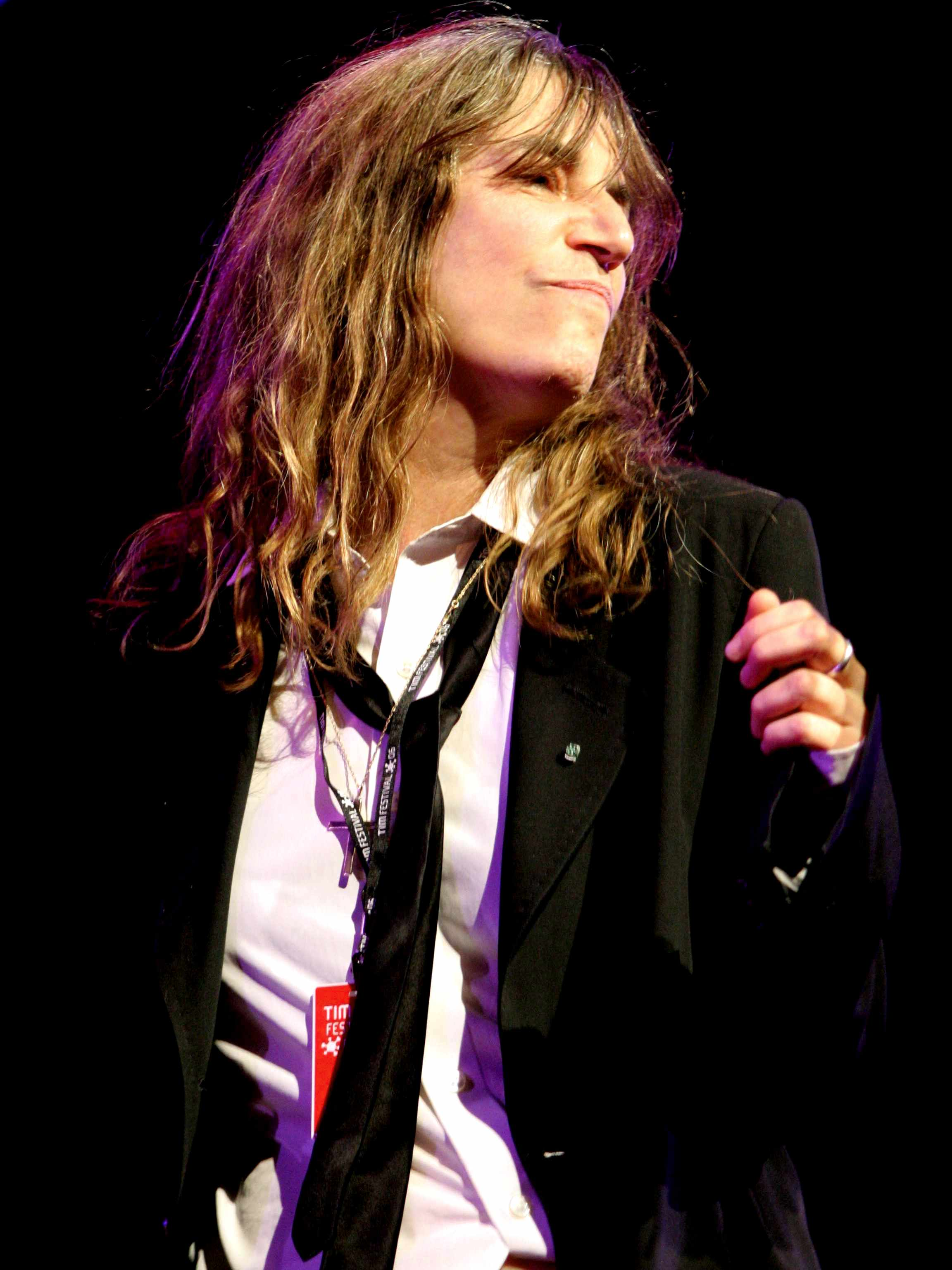
Mapplethorpe's former girlfriend and lifelong friend, singer Patti Smith

In 1963, Mapplethorpe enrolled at Pratt Institute in Brooklyn, where he majored in Graphic Arts. He first met Patti Smith toward the end of the spring semester of 1967, while he was living at St. James Place. Smith had been searching for a friend from New Jersey, but had mistakenly been given Mapplethorpe's address. Their paths crossed again several months later in Greenwich Village. Smith, who was on a date with a man making unwanted sexual advances, spotted Mapplethorpe in Tompkins Square Park and asked him to pretend to be her boyfriend. The two were immediately attracted to one another, and Smith subsequently moved in with Mapplethorpe, who was then sharing an apartment with Pat and Margaret Kennedy on Waverly Avenue in Brooklyn.

In November 1967, Mapplethorpe and Smith moved to a brownstone on Hall Street in Brooklyn, where they created an unconventional bohemian living and working environment. Both were aspiring artists while working at FAO Schwarz on Fifth Avenue, where Smith was a cashier and Mapplethorpe worked as a window trimmer. They spent their evenings working on their respective art projects. Mapplethorpe experimented with marijuana, amphetamines, and LSD, which he used while working on his art and he stopped attending classes.

In September 1968, Mapplethorpe returned to Pratt Institute using money from a student loan and moved back in with Pat and Margaret Kennedy on Waverly Avenue. During the winter intersession, he traveled to San Francisco, telling his friend Judy Linn, "I have to find out if I'm gay once and for all." He stayed in a commune with people he had met on the journey and later described the experience as a turning point in his life. After returning to New York, he became involved with a young man named Terry, whom he had met through Linn. Smith later recalled that Mapplethorpe's interest in homosexuality seemed to emerge suddenly.

Mapplethorpe also began incorporating homoerotic imagery into his art, making collages from gay pornography and creating sculptures that explored male sexuality. One of his works from this period consisted of a pair of jeans stuffed at the crotch with socks and wired to create a pulsating effect.

Mapplethorpe was scheduled to graduate from Pratt in June 1969 but failed his psychology final, leaving him one course short of completing his degree. After five years at the institute, he left without graduating and moved to a loft on Delancey Street on Manhattan's Lower East Side. His arrival in Manhattan coincided with the Stonewall riots, which became a pivotal event in the gay rights movement.

== Life and career ==
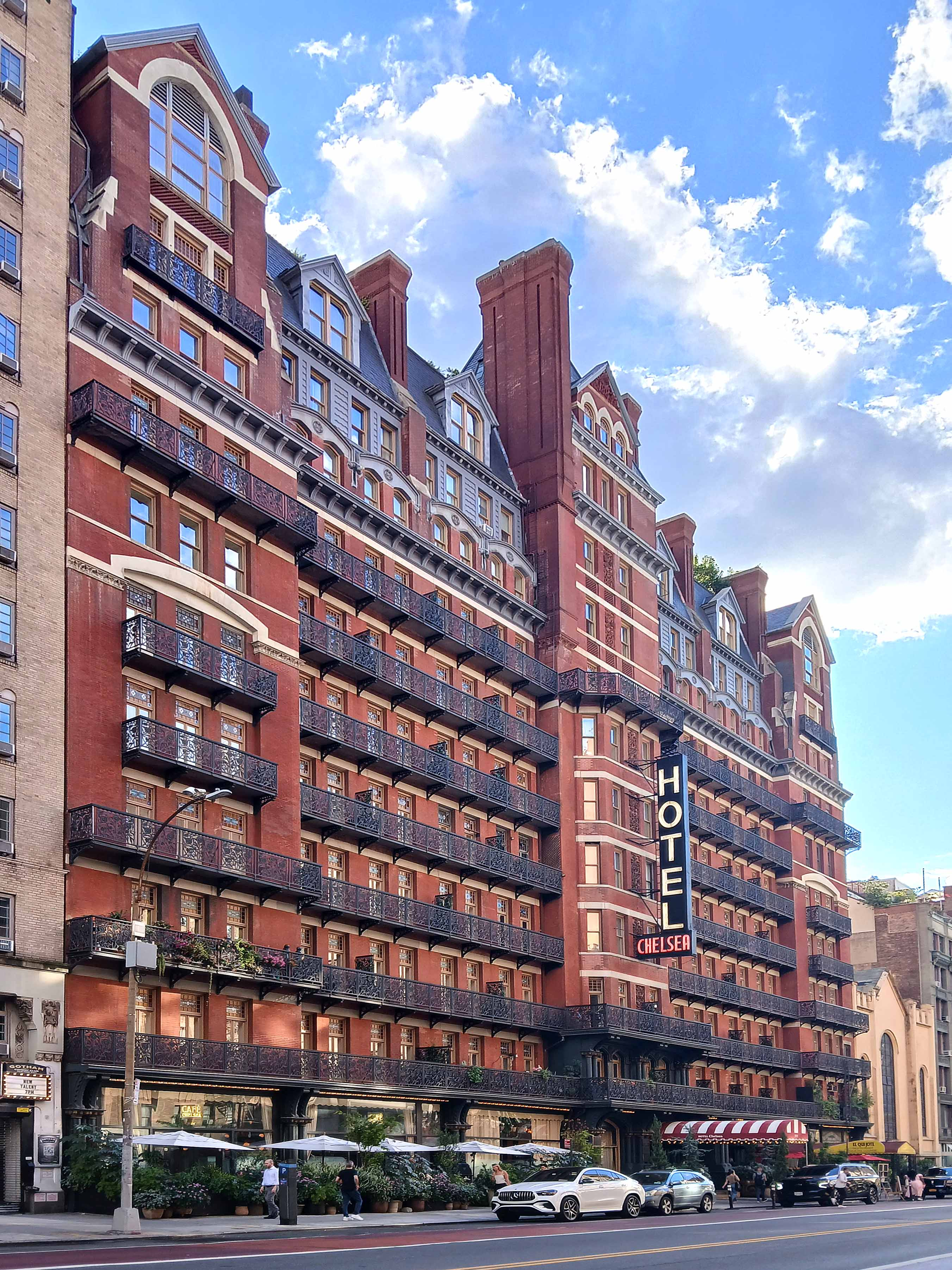
From 1969 to 1970, Mapplethorpe and Smith lived in room 1017 at the Chelsea Hotel

=== Networking ===
After spending several months in Paris, Smith returned to New York and moved into the Delancey Street loft where Mapplethorpe was living as a house sitter. After a neighbor was murdered in the building, the two fled the loft, taking only their art portfolios with them, and checked into the Allerton Hotel on West 22nd Street. Mapplethorpe was suffering from a severe infection and developed a high fever, but they could not afford medical treatment. After several days, Smith carried him down the hotel's fire escape and took him by taxi to the Chelsea Hotel in July 1969.

At the Chelsea, Smith persuaded hotel manager Stanley Bard to give them a room in exchange for her artwork as collateral. They were given room 1017, where they stayed together and continued to pursue their artistic ambitions. After Mapplethorpe recovered from his illness, he and Smith began actively networking among artists and other residents. Smith returned to her job at Scribner's while continuing to support Mapplethorpe financially. The two became known at the hotel for their distinctive clothing and bohemian style. Among the Chelsea residents they befriended was filmmaker and photographer Sandy Daley, who introduced them to people and places in the Chelsea and downtown New York.

Daley brought Mapplethorpe and Smith to Max's Kansas City, the Park Avenue South restaurant and bar that had become a gathering place for artists, musicians, celebrities, and other figures of New York's downtown cultural scene. The venue had close associations with Pop artist Andy Warhol and his circle, and Mapplethorpe was particularly interested in making connections with them. He and Smith regularly spent evenings at Max's, which eventually led to an invitation from rock promoter and writer Danny Fields to join his table. Smith and Mapplethorpe regarded this as an important breakthrough in their networking efforts.

Because their room at the Chelsea Hotel was too small to serve as a studio, Mapplethorpe and Smith rented a loft at 206 West 23rd Street. They initially continued sleeping at the Chelsea while working in the loft, but moved there permanently when the entire space became available in spring 1970. Mapplethorpe and Smith divided the loft into separate workspaces and concentrated on their art when they were not networking at Max's Kansas City.

=== Early artistic ventures ===
In spring 1970, one of Mapplethorpe's denim jackets, adorned with symbolic charms, was included in Clothing as Art, a group exhibition organized by Stanley Amos at the Chelsea Hotel. He also began selling his jewelry to clients associated with the Max's Kansas City scene. His handmade jewelry combined found materials with beads, dice, feathers, rabbit's feet, silver skulls, and crosses, reflecting his Baroque sense of style. His jewelry was modeled by Warhol superstars Ultra Violet, Jay Johnson, and Joe Dallesandro. Although his jewelry attracted attention and a potential financial backer offered to provide seed money for a jewelry business, Mapplethorpe declined, preferring to pursue his work as an artist rather than establish himself as a jewelry designer.

During this period, Mapplethorpe continued to develop drawings and collages while experimenting with photography. Influenced in part by Marcel Duchamp's concept of the readymade, he constructed assemblages from discarded objects and incorporated religious and sadomasochistic imagery into his work.

On Memorial Day 1970, Mapplethorpe met model David Croland, who was staying with his friend Tinkerbelle at the Chelsea Hotel. Mapplethorpe initially kept his relationship with Croland from Smith, but Tinkerbelle eventually told her about it. Shortly after, Mapplethorpe collaborated with Daley on the film Robert Having His Nipple Pierced, which documented a nipple-piercing performed by Dr. Herb Krohn, the Chelsea Hotel's resident physician. Daley conceived the film as a "happening," with Mapplethorpe and Croland as its central figures.

Mapplethorpe began using Daley's Polaroid camera to photograph himself and later Croland. Mapplethorpe's earliest public statement on gay sexuality appeared in 1970 on the cover of Gay Power, which called itself "New York's First Homosexual Newspaper." His collage Bull's Eye depicts a man in leather boots with his genitals covered by a red dot and his face obscured by a black strip.

=== Emergence as a photographer ===
In July 1971, Croland, introduced Mapplethorpe to John McKendry, curator of photographs and prints at the Metropolitan Museum of Art, who became his first significant benefactor. Through McKendry, Mapplethorpe gained access to influential figures in the art and fashion worlds, including Henry Geldzahler, who introduced him to David Hockney, and photographer Francesco Scavullo. Mapplethorpe acknowledged that he deliberately cultivated connections to advance his career, describing his approach as "subtle aggressiveness."

In September 1971, McKendry invited Mapplethorpe to accompany him on a trip to London, and arranged for him to stay with Katharine Tennant at her flat on King's Road. McKendry encouraged Mapplethorpe to photograph members of Britain's aristocracy, envisioning him as a successor to Cecil Beaton as a portraitist of high society. During his three-week stay in London, however, Mapplethorpe made relatively few photographs, but met artist and filmmaker Derek Jarman. He also had a sexual encounter with McKendry in London, and photographed him in a bathtub at Alexis de la Falaise's farmhouse in Wales.

When McKendry returned to New York, Mapplethorpe traveled to Paris, where he stayed with fashion designer Fernando Sanchez and socialized with Loulou de la Falaise and fashion designer Yves Saint Laurent. Saint Laurent took an interest in Mapplethorpe's handmade fetish jewelry, incorporating similar designs into his collections. Mapplethorpe spent his 25th birthday in Paris on November 4, 1971. Concerned that his career was losing momentum, he told McKendry that he would not return to New York until he had taken more photographs. He remained in Paris, where he began a relationship with a Frenchman named François, whom he photographed several times over the following years.

On November 24, 1971, Robert Having His Nipple Pierced premiered at the Museum of Modern Art, following efforts by Daley to persuade the museum to screen the film. Later that year, McKendry gave Mapplethorpe a Polaroid camera for Christmas, replacing the borrowed and unreliable cameras he had previously used. In a letter, Mapplethorpe expressed his gratitude to McKendry and his wife Maxime de la Falaise for their support, and wrote that he was confident that his work would eventually have an influence.

Mapplethorpe had not yet committed himself exclusively to photography and was still working with collages and assemblages. Inspired by Joseph Cornell, he created Cornell-style boxes for the McKendrys. McKendry gave him access to the Metropolitan Museum's private photography collection, allowing him to study works that had not been publicly exhibited. Curator Henry Geldzahler later said that McKendry "taught Robert about photography in the best possible way." In April 1972, McKendry took Mapplethorpe to Boston and introduced him to executives at the Polaroid Corporation, whose Artist Support Program provided cameras and film to selected artists.

=== Career breakthrough ===
Mapplethorpe owned a loft at 24 Bond Street in the NoHo, Manhattan from 1972 until his death in 1989

In 1972, Croland introduced Mapplethorpe to art curator and collector Sam Wagstaff, whom he had met through curator Sam Green and photographer Peter Hujar. Wagstaff had become interested in Mapplethorpe after seeing a Polaroid of him in Croland's apartment and soon contacted him. Mapplethorpe showed Wagstaff his collages, constructions, jewelry, Polaroids, and photographic transfers. Although Wagstaff was reserved about the explicit sexual content of Mapplethorpe's work, he was impressed by its candor and offered his support. Wagstaff and Mapplethorpe became lovers, and Mapplethorpe later credited their relationship with transforming his life and career, saying, "It was love at first sight. After that, everything turned around for me."

When Smith decided to move in with her boyfriend, musician Allen Lanier, Mapplethorpe could not afford to remain in their apartment. In October 1972, Wagstaff gave him $15,000 toward a loft at 24 Bond Street, only a short distance from his own loft. The financial support enabled Mapplethorpe to establish his own home and studio, allowing him to devote himself more fully to his artistic career. Although they were sometimes portrayed as having a reciprocal arrangement in which Wagstaff promoted Mapplethorpe's career while Mapplethorpe assisted with his collection, no formal agreement existed. Mapplethorpe initially had mixed feelings about photography but increasingly recognized its suitability to his working methods. In 1988, he told curator Janet Kardon:

"It [photography] was the perfect medium, or so it seemed, for the seventies and eighties, when everything was fast. If I were to make something that took two weeks to do, I'd lose my enthusiasm. It would become an act of labor and the love would be gone. With photography, you zero in; you put a lot of energy into short moments, and then you go on to the next thing. It seems to allow you to function in a very contemporary way and still produce the material."

Wagstaff gave Mapplethorpe a Hasselblad camera fitted with a Polaroid back, which he used to experiment with self-portraits and photographs of a wide circle of friends and acquaintances. His growing focus on Polaroid photography led to his first solo gallery exhibition, Don't Touch Here, held at the Light Gallery in New York City in January 1973. The exhibition featured his Polaroids and took its title from the protective sleeve of a Polaroid print, while also alluding to Duchamp's Prière de toucher (Please Touch), the cover he designed for the 1947 exhibition catalogue Le Surréalisme en 1947.

It he spring of 1973, he participated in the group exhibition Soft as Art, which featured soft sculptures, at the New York Cultural Center. In September, Andreas Brown, owner of the Gotham Book Mart, published Smith's third volume of poetry, Witt. Smith commissioned Mapplethorpe to photograph her for the cover and persuaded Brown to include his photographs in an upcoming group exhibition at the bookstore featuring Polaroids by Pop artist Andy Warhol and his associate Brigid Polk.

Mapplethorpe's Banana & Keys was published in the November 1975 issue of Warhol's Interview, bringing his photography wider recognition. The image combined humor and sexual symbolism, with the keys suggesting their owner's preferred S&M role and the banana carrying a sexual connotation. In 1976, Mapplethorpe became a contributing photographer for Interview. During a trip to London that June, he photographed members of the British aristocracy and upper class, including Isabella and Rose Lambton, Guy Nevill, Stella Astor, Charlie Tennant, John Paul Getty III, and Catherine Guinness.

By the end of the summer, Mapplethorpe secured representation by Holly Solomon after a sexual liaison with a man who was an employee of her gallery introduced her to his work. When Solomon visited his loft, she was unimpressed by his erotic photographs but admired his portraits and decided to "auditioned" Mapplethorpe as she had other artists who had created portraits of her. Mapplethorpe photographed Solomon reclining on her bed and later presenting her with a framed triptych. Solomon agreed to represent him due to his understanding of contemporary painting, sculpture, and photography, and she was influenced by the endorsement of Wagstaff. In November, one of Mapplethorpe's photographs of a Dalmatian was included in the group exhibition Animals at the Holly Solomon Gallery. In February 1977, the gallery presented a solo exhibition of Mapplethorpe's portraits, while his erotic photographs were shown separately at The Kitchen in SoHo.

=== S&M period ===
Mapplethorpe increasingly documented New York's gay S&M subculture, approaching it as both a photographer and participant rather than as an outside observer. Poet George Stambolian later said that Mapplethorpe "permitted his neuroses to work to his advantage", turning his strong sexual drive into a source for his art. Seeking introductions to the community, Mapplethorpe met Jack Fritscher, editor of Drummer, a magazine devoted to the leather subculture. Fritscher commissioned him to photograph an S&M call boy named Elliott for the cover of Drummer No. 24 in 1977. The photograph, showing Elliott in leather with a cigar, was Mapplethorpe's only assignment for the magazine, but Elliott subsequently introduced him to other members of the S&M community. Mapplethorpe described the community as a "sex network" in which gaining people's trust was essential to photographing them.

In 1977, Solomon successfully advocated for Mapplethorpe's work to be included in Documenta 6 in Kassel, Germany. However, he felt she was not adequately promoting his career and believed that representation by an uptown gallery would help balance his provocative image with a more conservative setting. That year, Robert Miller opened a gallery at 724 Fifth Avenue and offered to exhibit Patti Smith's drawings. Knowing that Mapplethorpe wanted to leave the Holly Solomon Gallery, Smith accepted on the condition that Miller also include him in a joint exhibition with her. Miller had seen Mapplethorpe's work at exhibitions at the Holly Solomon Gallery and the Kitchen and was impressed by his portraits. Although initially reluctant to represent a photographer and concerned about the S&M work, Miller eventually agreed to include him in the exhibition, allowing him to leave the Holly Solomon Gallery.

In February 1978, Mapplethorpe told Warhol that he was traveling to San Francisco for his upcoming show and a month for a "sex vacation", calling it "the best place for sex in America". His exhibition at the Simon Lowinsky Gallery primarily featured photographs of men in heavy leather, S&M, men in wetsuits, and fully exposed genitals, alongside more neutral images, including a nude portrait of Smith and close-ups of flowers. The gallery had edited out some of the more explicit photographs, which was shown the following month at 80 Langton Street.

During this period, Mapplethorpe regularly visited New York's nightlife scene, including Studio 54 and the Mineshaft, a members-only BDSM leather bar and sex club in the Meatpacking District. While Studio 54 primarily served as a social setting, Mapplethorpe was a frequent presence Mineshaft, where he scouted for casual sex partners and men to photograph. Mapplethorpe's access to the club provided him with a setting in which to document a subculture that became a significant subject of his work.

In 1980, Mapplethorpe met Milton Moore, who was AWOL from the U.S. Navy, at the gay bar Sneakers in the West Village. Moore became his muse, and in November 1981, Mapplethorpe rented a studio apartment at 88 Bleecker Street, where they lived. By 1982, Mapplethorpe was supporting Moore financially, paying his legal expenses, and encouraging him to study photography at Parsons School of Design. Moore struggled to maintain employment and experienced increasingly erratic behavior. In an effort to salvage their relationship, Mapplethorpe traveled with Moore to visit his family in rural Tennessee. The visit proved difficult for both men, as Moore was distressed about the derogatory way Mapplethorpe spoke to him. Several weeks later, Moore moved out of their New York apartment, which left Mapplethorpe "grief-stricken".

=== Late career and illness ===
In 1982, Mapplethorpe began an on-off relationship with Jack Walls, a clerk-typist from Chicago who became his muse. Their relationship was marked by arguments over money and drug use. Mapplethorpe evicted Walls from his Bleecker Street apartment in 1984 after accusing him of stealing money, but later reconciled with him. Mapplethorpe had also begun promoting Walls's career, believing he had the potential to become the "new Ben Vereen", and arranged for him to appear in connection with the premiere of his film Lady at Private Eyes nightclub in December 1984.

In the 1980s, Mapplethorpe lived and worked from his top-floor loft at 35 West 23rd Street the Flatiron District of Midtown Manhattan

Mapplethorpe and Wagstaff had remained good friends after their romance ended, and Wagstaff gave Mapplethorpe $500,000 to purchase a top-floor loft at 35 West 23rd Street, where he resided and used as a photoshoot studio. He retained his Bond Street studio as a darkroom. Mapplethorpe was the principal inheritor of Wagstaff's fortune and executor of his estate after he died from AIDS in 1987. Following a year of legal disputes over Wagstaff's estate, Wagstaff's sister, Judith Jefferson, dropped her lawsuit, leaving Mapplethorpe a substantial inheritance.

In September 1986, Mapplethorpe became seriously ill with pneumonia and was admitted to Beth Israel Hospital in New York. He initially resisted hospitalization, but eventually agreed to undergo testing at the urging of his friend Dimitri Levas. A bronchoscopy confirmed that he had AIDS-related Pneumocystis carinii pneumonia (PCP). By then, many of the men he had photographed for The Black Book, which was published later that year by St. Martin's Press, had already died from AIDS. Mapplethorpe's brother Edward Mapplethorpe, the only family member who knew he had AIDS, returned to New York to help care for him. Mapplethorpe allowed Edward to live rent-free at his Bond Street loft and paid him a salary to assist in the studio. After attempting to pursue a movie career, Walls also returned from Los Angeles and moved into Mapplethorpe's 23rd Street loft. Despite their conflicts, Mapplethorpe paid Walls $300 a week to supervise the household, and the two resumed their relationship.

As his illness progressed, Mapplethorpe faced increasing restrictions with doctors advising him to stop smoking and using cocaine and friends encouraging alternative treatments. Alexandra Knaust, whom Mapplethorpe had met in the early 1980s while she worked for photographer Gilles Larrain, became an important figure in his later life. In 1984, Mapplethorpe appointed her as his agent in London, where she worked to promote his career. After his AIDS diagnosis, Knaust became involved in coordinating his medical care and contacted AIDS researchers and officials on his behalf. Through her efforts, Mapplethorpe was introduced to Dr. Michael Lange, who was conducting experimental clinical trials of AZT at Roosevelt-St. Luke's Hospital in Manhattan.

In January 1988, American Photography published a cover story on Mapplethorpe titled "Mapplethorpe: The Art of My Wicked, Wicked Ways". Mapplethorpe objected to the article's discussion of AIDS, telling writer Paul Taylor that he wanted to be portrayed "as a normal artist". He became particularly upset by a caption identifying Wagstaff as his "lover", fearing that his parents might learn about his homosexuality.

In February 1988, Mapplethorpe traveled to Amsterdam with Lynn Davis and Walls to attend the opening of his exhibition at the Stedelijk Museum. In March, he traveled to London for a series of events organized by Knaust, including an exhibition at the National Portrait Gallery. His photographs of prominent cultural figures, including Lord Snowdon, Norman Mailer, Truman Capote, William S. Burroughs, Richard Gere, Glenn Close, Iggy Pop, and David Byrne, were displayed alongside his 1987 self-portrait. Curator Sandy Nairne recalled that Mapplethorpe was treated "like a rock star", with young visitors seeking his autograph despite his visibly declining health.

A coinciding exhibition of still-lifes and nudes at Hamiltons Gallery in Mayfair drew large crowds. He was profiled in an Arena documentary that was broadcast on BBC2 in the United Kingdom. The documentary became controversial after Knaust sought to remove references to AIDS, reflecting Mapplethorpe's continuing concern about being known as an "AIDS artist".

In July 1988, Mapplethorpe attended the opening of his first major American museum retrospective at the Whitney Museum of American Art in New York City. That year, Mapplethorpe selected Patricia Morrisroe to write his biography, which was based on more than 300 interviews with celebrities, critics, lovers, and Mapplethorpe himself.

== Death ==
=== Hospitalization ===
On February 21, 1989, Mapplethorpe traveled to Boston with Alexandra Knaust, Lynn Davis, and private-duty nurse Tom Peterman. He was admitted to New England Deaconess Hospital, where he was scheduled to receive an experimental CD-4 treatment under the care of Dr. Groopman. Groopman hadn't been aware that Mapplethorpe had a bacterial pneumonia, so the lung infection had to be treated first with intravenous antibiotics.

On March 5, as Mapplethorpe was scheduled to receive the CD-4 treatment, he developed severe gastrointestinal bleeding and was subjected to further medical procedures. His weakened immune system and resulting complications made the treatment impossible. As his condition deteriorated, Knaust contacted his friends and family in New York. On March 7, his brother Edward, Dimitri Levas, Amy Sullivan, Ingrid Sischy, Michael Stout, and Jack Walls gathered at his bedside. Mapplethorpe did not want other members of his family to visit him in the hospital, but his sister Nancy came to Boston after their brother informed her of his condition. When she asked him if there was anything he wanted her to tell their parents, he replied, "No, nothing."

On March 7, Patti Smith learned how rapidly Mapplethorpe's condition had deteriorated. In their final conversation, he asked her to write the introduction to his forthcoming book of flower photographs. During his final days, Mapplethorpe continued to draw in a sketchbook, producing a faint self-portrait followed by repeated versions of his signature.

On March 8, Mapplethorpe became paralyzed on the left side of his face and lost the ability to speak. His doctors increased his morphine as his condition worsened. That evening, his brother Edward notified the hospital chaplain, who administered the last rites. Following a seizure, Mapplethorpe died at age 42 due to complications from HIV/AIDS at 5:30 am on March 9, 1989, at Deaconess Hospital in Boston.

=== Memorial service and burial ===
On May 22, 1989, a private memorial service for Mapplethorpe was held at the Whitney Museum of American Art in New York City. Mapplethorpe did not leave his parents anything in his will. His mother, Joan, attended despite being in poor health. She died three days later. Mapplethorpe's brother Edward subsequently retrieved his ashes and placed them in the coffin with their mother. They were buried together at St. John's Cemetery in Queens. Their father, Harry, "for private reasons" chose not to include Mapplethorpe's name on the gravestone, which is etched "Maxey."

== Works ==
Mapplethorpe worked predominantly in black-and-white photography, although some of his later work and his New Color Works exhibition incorporated color. Much of his work explored erotic and sexually explicit imagery, including photographs influenced by pornography. He sought to use such imagery not simply to arouse viewers but to provoke a visceral response comparable to the reaction he experienced as a teenager when viewing pornography in New York's Times Square. As he explained, "The feeling I got was a strong stomach reaction, and I thought it would be extraordinary to get that gut feeling from a work of art." He emphasized that he was interested in a response "stronger and much more interesting" than sexual arousal.

Robert took areas of dark human consent and made them into art. He worked without apology, investing the homosexual with grandeur, masculinity, and enviable nobility. Without affectation, he created a presence that was wholly male without sacrificing feminine grace. He was not looking to make a political statement or an announcement of his evolving sexual persuasion. He was presenting something new, something not seen or explored as he saw and explored it. Robert sought to elevate aspects of male experience, to imbue homosexuality with mysticism. As Cocteau said of a Genet poem, "His obscenity is never obscene."

— Patti Smith, Just Kids (2010)

Among Mapplethorpe's early subjects was Warhol associate Jay Johnson, whom he photographed using a Polaroid and subsequently depicted in Untitled (Baby/Jay Johnson) (1972), a painting he later enlarged and incorporated into the assemblage Jay Kiss (1973). His former girlfriend Patti Smith was also a recurring subject, and one of his stark portraits of her was used as the cover of her 1975 debut album, Horses.

Mapplethorpe's art dealer Holly Solomon praised his ability to understand and work with his subjects. His erotic photography explored a range of sexual subjects, including New York's BDSM subculture during the 1970s. Thomas Albright of the San Francisco Chronicle described Mapplethorpe's photography as "pedestrianly conventional," characterized by "rigidly posed, crisply focused, somewhat melodramatically illuminated" reminiscent of commercial glamour photography. Andy Grundberg of The New York Times compared Mapplethorpe's style to that of fashion photographers George Hoyningen-Huene and George Platt Lynes, noting their "mastery of light, classical compositions and indebtedness to Surrealism." Grundberg also observed that, like his predecessors, Mapplethorpe was sought after as a commercial photographer and approached both conventional and provocative subjects with the "same cool, almost clinically dispassionate gaze."

Mapplethorpe drew inspiration from American photographer George Dureau, whose photographs included fully nude African American men and men with disabilities in New Orleans. Mapplethorpe's interest in the Black male nude led to the publication of Black Males in 1980. He continued photographing Black male nudes throughout the 1980s, often portraying lovers. One recurring model was Derrick Cross, whose pose in the 1983 photograph Derrick Cross has been compared with the Farnese Hercules. Mapplethorpe worked as a participant-observer in his erotic photography, sometimes engaging sexually with the men he photographed.

Between 1980 and 1983, Mapplethorpe created over 150 photographs of bodybuilder Lisa Lyon, culminating in the 1983 photobook Lady, Lisa Lyon, published by Viking Press and with text by Bruce Chatwin. In 1983, Mapplethorpe and Andy Warhol photographed one another, and Warhol created a silkscreen portrait of Mapplethorpe. Mapplethorpe photographed Warhol again in 1986. Other subjects included flowers, especially orchids and calla lilies, children, statues, and celebrities and other artists, including Arnold Schwarzenegger, Louise Bourgeois, Debbie Harry, Susan Sontag, Kathy Acker, Peter Gabriel, Paul Simon, Grace Jones, Amanda Lear, Laurie Anderson, Philip Glass, David Hockney, Cindy Sherman, Joan Armatrading.

Cocaine was closely associated with Mapplethorpe's photographic practice. Friends and colleagues described his use as "highly controlled," while one of his dealers maintained that he was seriously addicted. Mapplethorpe frequently used cocaine while photographing and offered it to his sitters. ARTnews critic Gerrit Henry noted his ability to create "light effects that are the visual equivalents of certain psychological states induced by cocaine." The wide-eyed stare characteristic of some of his portraits was sometimes attributed to cocaine use, while Mapplethorpe also deliberately pursued a sharp "coke look." The exceptional quality of Mapplethorpe's prints was achieved with the technical assistance of printer Tom Baril from 1979 to 1989.

Mapplethorpe also designed a coffee table in the 1980s.

=== Art market ===
In 1988, Mapplethorpe charged $10,000 for a sitting, while his one-of-a-kind photographs sold for an average of $20,000. Prints from his New York dealer, Robert Miller Gallery, were priced from $5,000.

Mapplethorpe's death in March 1989, followed by the controversy surrounding Robert Mapplethorpe: The Perfect Moment, contributed to a sharp increase in demand for his work. By April 1990, some of his prints were selling for as much as $35,000, with dealers attributing the rise in prices to both his death and the extensive publicity surrounding his work.

In 2006, Mapplethorpe's 1986 photograph of Warhol sold for $643,200, making it the most expensive Mapplethorpe photograph ever sold.

In October 2015, Mapplethorpe's Man in Polyester Suit (1980), depicting his lover Milton Moore in a three-piece suit with his penis exposed, sold at Sotheby's New York for $478,000. The image was part of Mapplethorpe's "X Portfolio" series, and previously sold for $9,000 in 1992. It was later sold for $355,600 at Phillips in April 2023.

In 2017, a 1987 Mapplethorpe self-portrait platinum print was auctioned for £450,000.

== Controversy ==
=== The Black Book ===
Mapplethorpe's 1986 solo exhibition Black Males and the accompanying book The Black Book generated controversy for their erotic depictions of Black men, with critics arguing that the images were exploitative. The photographs are largely phallocentric and sculptural, emphasizing isolated parts of the body. Mapplethorpe aimed to pursue the Platonic ideal through these images. He stated that he had been sexually involved with "at least 75 percent" of the men featured in the book, several of whom were rumored to have AIDS. His biographer Patricia Morrisroe said, "He found the n word sexually stimulating, and used it liberally in relation to his lovers and models. It was as if he didn't see them as people but as objects – something that's obvious in his photographs. … Milton Moore (Man in Polyester Suit) was perhaps the great love of his life, but he considered him a 'primitive.'"

Criticism was the subject of a work by American conceptual artist Glenn Ligon, Notes on the Margins of the Black Book (1991–1993). Ligon juxtaposes Mapplethorpe's 91 images of black men in the 1988 publication Black Book with critical texts and personal reactions about the work to complicate the racial undertones of the imagery.

American poet and activist Essex Hemphill also expressed criticism in his anthology Brother to Brother (1991). Although he believed that Mapplethorpe's work reflected exceptional talent, Hemphill also believed that it displayed a lack of concern for gay black men, "except as sexual subjects."

=== The Perfect Moment ===
In 1989, Mapplethorpe's traveling solo exhibition Robert Mapplethorpe: The Perfect Moment brought national attention to debates over public funding for the arts, censorship, and obscenity. Curated by Janet Kardon of the Institute of Contemporary Art (ICA) in Philadelphia, the exhibition included photographs from Mapplethorpe's "X Portfolio," depicting urophagia and gay BDSM, as well as a self-portrait featuring a bullwhip inserted into his anus. The exhibition also included photographs of two children with exposed genitals.

The ICA received a grant from the National Endowment for the Arts (NEA) to support the exhibition's presentation at the Corcoran Gallery of Art in Washington, D.C. After the Corcoran reviewed the works, however, it cancelled the exhibition and terminated its agreement with the ICA, amid concerns about the political controversy surrounding the photographs. The cancellation instead intensified the national debate over NEA funding of artworks considered obscene or offensive by some members of the public and Congress.

In June 1989, Pop artist Lowell Blair Nesbitt, a longtime friend of Mapplethorpe, publicly announced that he would revoke a $1.5 million bequest to the Corcoran if the museum did not present the exhibition. The Corcoran proceeded with its cancellation, and Nesbitt subsequently left the bequest to the Phillips Collection. The exhibition's underwriters then supported a presentation at the nonprofit Washington Project for the Arts, which displayed the full exhibition from July 21 to August 13, 1989, attracting large crowds.

The controversy continued in 1990, when the Contemporary Arts Center in Cincinnati and its director, Dennis Barrie, were charged with obscenity over the exhibition's presentation there. The charges concerned photographs depicting men in sadomasochistic poses. Both the museum and Barrie were found not guilty by a jury.

=== University of Central England incident ===
In October 1997, the University of Central England became involved in a controversy after West Midlands Police confiscated a library book containing photographs by Mapplethorpe. A postgraduate student was writing a paper on his work and had taken photographs from the book Mapplethorpe to a local shop for developing as illustrations for her paper. The shop staff contacted the police, who subsequently confiscated the book from the student.

Police informed the university that two photographs in the book would have to be removed before it could be returned. The photographs, which police considered potentially prosecutable as obscene, were Helmut and Brooks, NYC, 1978, depicting anal fisting, and Jim and Tom, Sausalito, 1977, depicting a man urinating into another man's mouth. In March 1998, Peter Knight, the university's vice-chancellor, announced that the university intended to fight the charge. In September, he was informed that no legal action would be taken and the book was returned with the photographs intact.

== Legacy ==
=== Robert Mapplethorpe Foundation ===
In 1988, the ailing Mapplethorpe helped found the Robert Mapplethorpe Foundation, Inc. His vision for the Foundation was that it would be "the appropriate vehicle to protect his work, to advance his creative vision, and to promote the causes he cared about". Since his death, the Foundation has functioned as his official estate and helped promote his work throughout the world, and has raised and donated millions of dollars to fund medical research in the fight against AIDS and HIV infection.

In October 1989, Christie's auctioned contents from Mapplethorpe's personal collection of art, furniture, and decorative objects, raising $2.27 million. Proceeds went to the Robert Mapplethorpe Foundation and photography collections at major museums.

In 1991, the Foundation received the Large Nonprofit Organization of the Year award as part of the Pantheon of Leather Awards. The Foundation donated $1 million towards the 1993 establishment of the Robert Mapplethorpe Residence, a six-story townhouse for long-term residential AIDS treatment on East 17th Street in New York City, in partnership with the Beth Israel Medical Center. The residence closed in 2015, citing financial difficulties.

The Foundation also promotes fine art photography at the institutional level, and helps determine which galleries represent Mapplethorpe's art. In 2011, the Robert Mapplethorpe Foundation donated the Robert Mapplethorpe Archive, spanning from 1970 to 1989, to the Getty Research Institute.

=== Books and films ===
Mapplethorpe: A Biography by Patricia Morrisroe was published by Random House in 1995. The Washington Post Book World described it as "Mesmerizing … Morrisroe has succeeded in re-creating the photographer's world of light and dark." Art critic Arthur C. Danto, writing in The Nation, praised it as "utterly admirable … The clarity and honesty of Morrisroe's portrait are worthy of its subject."

In September 1999, Arena Editions published Pictures, a monograph that reintroduced Mapplethorpe's sex pictures. In 2000, Pictures was seized by two South Australian plain-clothes detectives from an Adelaide bookshop in the belief that the book breached indecency and obscenity laws. Police sent the book to the Canberra-based Office of Film and Literature Classification after the state Attorney-General's Department deftly decided not to get involved in the mounting publicity storm. Eventually, the OFLC board agreed unanimously that the book, imported from the United States, should remain freely available and unrestricted.

In May 2007, James Crump directed the documentary film Black White + Gray, which premiered at the 2007 Tribeca Film Festival. It explores the influence Mapplethorpe, curator Sam Wagstaff, and Patti Smith had on the 1970s art scene in New York City.

In September 2007, Prestel published Mapplethorpe: Polaroids, a collection of 183 of approximately 1,500 existing Mapplethorpe polaroids. The book accompanied an exhibition by the Whitney Museum of American Art in May 2008.

Mapplethorpe's former girlfriend Patti Smith, wrote the memoir Just Kids (2010) about their relationship. The book won the 2010 National Book Award for Nonfiction.

The documentary film, Mapplethorpe: Look at the Pictures, was released in 2016. It was directed and executive produced by Randy Barbato and Fenton Bailey, and produced by Katharina Otto-Bernstein.

In 2016, Rizzoli published Robert Mapplethorpe: The Archive, edited by Frances Terpak and Michelle Brunnick, with essays by Patti Smith and Jonathan Weinberg. The book presented more than 400 images and archival materials documenting Mapplethorpe's artistic development, including early drawings, collages, jewelry, Polaroids, and photographs.

In April 2018, Mapplethorpe directed by Ondi Timoner and starring Matt Smith in the lead role premiered at the Tribeca Film Festival in New York City.

=== In pop culture ===
In 1992, author Paul Russell dedicated his novel Boys of Life to Mapplethorpe, as well as to Karl Keller and Pier Paolo Pasolini.

In 2008, Mapplethorpe was named by Equality Forum as one of its 31 Icons of the 2008 LGBT History Month.

In June 2016, Belgian fashion designer Raf Simons debuted his men's Spring 2017 collection inspired by Mapplethorpe's work and featuring several of his photographs printed onto shirts, jackets, and smocks.

In 2021, musical artist Patricia Taxxon released the album The Flowers of Robert Mapplethorpe.

In 2021, the Robert Mapplethorpe Foundation collaborated with French jewelry house Repossi on an eight-piece fine jewelry collection inspired by Mapplethorpe's early handmade jewelry.

In 2022, Isaac Cole Powell played a character in American Horror Story: NYC named 'Theo Graves' loosely inspired by Mapplethorpe's life as an erotic photographer, relationship with his mentor and art curator Sam Wagstaff, and death from HIV/AIDS complications.

In May 2026, Troye Sivan attended the Met Gala in an outfit inspired by Mapplethorpe's fashion style.

== Selected publications ==
- Hollinghurst, Alan; Morgan, Stuart (1983). Robert Mapplethorpe: 1970–1983. London: Institute of Contemporary Arts. ISBN 0-905263-31-6.
- Mapplethorpe, Robert; Chatwin, Bruce (1983). Lady, Lisa Lyon. New York: Viking Press. ISBN 0-670-43012-9.
- Mapplethorpe, Robert (1985). Certain People: A Book of Portraits. Pasadena, CA: Twelvetrees Press. ISBN 0-942642-14-7.
- Mapplethorpe, Robert; Shange, Ntozake (1986). Black Book. New York: St. Martin's Press. ISBN 0-312-08302-5.
- Mapplethorpe Portraits. London: National Portrait Gallery. 1988. ISBN 0-904017-91-5.
- Mapplethorpe, Robert; Didion, Joan (1989). Some Women. Boston: Bulfinch Press. ISBN 0-8212-1716-X.
- Kardon, Janet; Joselit, David; Larson, Kay (1988). Robert Mapplethorpe: The Perfect Moment. Philadelphia: Institute of Contemporary Art, University of Pennsylvania. ISBN 0-88454-046-4.
- Cheim, John (1991). Early Works 1970–1974. New York: Robert Miller Gallery. ISBN 0-944680-36-4.
- Mapplethorpe, Robert; Danto, Arthur Coleman (1992). Mapplethorpe. New York: Random House. ISBN 0-679-40804-5.
- Levas, Dimitri; Sischy, Ingrid (1999). Pictures. Arena Editions. ISBN 1-892041-16-2.
- Celant, Germano; Ippolitov, Arkadiĭ; Vail, Karole P B; Blessing, Jennifer (2004). Robert Mapplethorpe and the Classical Tradition: Photographs and Mannerist Prints. New York: Solomon R. Guggenheim Museum. ISBN 0-89207-312-8.
- Mapplethorpe, Robert (2006). The Complete Flowers. Essay by Herbert Muschamp. New York: teNeues. ISBN 3-8327-9168-X.
- Wolf, Sylvia (2007). Polaroids: Mapplethorpe. Munich and New York: Prestel. ISBN 978-3-7913-3835-4.
- Martineau, Paul; Salvesen, Britt (2016). Robert Mapplethorpe: The Photographs. Los Angeles: J. Paul Getty Museum. ISBN 978-1-60606-469-6.

== Selected exhibitions ==
1973

- Don't Touch Here, Light Gallery, New York.

1977

- Robert Mapplethorpe: Pictures, Holly Solomon Gallery, New York.
- Erotic Pictures, The Kitchen, New York.
- Robert Mapplethorpe: Flowers, Holly Solomon Gallery, New York.

1978

- Mapplethorpe/Weegee, Simon Lowinsky Gallery, San Francisco.
- Censored, 80 Langton Street, San Francisco.

1980

- Black Males, Galerie Jurka, Amsterdam.

1983

- Lady, Lisa Lyon, Leo Castelli Gallery, New York.
- Robert Mapplethorpe, Centre National d'Art et de Culture Georges Pompidou, Paris.
- Robert Mapplethorpe, 1970–1983, Institute of Contemporary Arts, London; Stills, Edinburgh; Arnolfini, Bristol.

1984

- Robert Mapplethorpe, 1970–1983, Midland Group, Nottingham; and Modern Art Oxford, Oxford.

1988

- Robert Mapplethorpe, Whitney Museum of American Art, New York.
- The Perfect Moment, Institute of Contemporary Art, Philadelphia; Museum of Contemporary Art, Chicago; Washington Project for the Arts, Washington, D.C.; Wadsworth Atheneum, Hartford; University Art Museum, University of California, Berkeley; Contemporary Arts Center, Cincinnati; and Institute of Contemporary Art, Boston.

1992

- Robert Mapplethorpe, Louisiana Museum of Modern Art, Humlebæk; Museum für Kunst und Gewerbe, Hamburg; Palazzo Fortuny, Venice.
- Robert Mapplethorpe, Tokyo Metropolitan Teien Art Museum, Tokyo.

1993

- Robert Mapplethorpe, Moderna Museet, Stockholm; Turun Taidemuseo, Turku; Palais des Beaux-Arts, Brussels; Museo Pecci, Prato.
- Robert Mapplethorpe, ATM Contemporary Art Gallery, Mito; Museum of Modern Art, Kamakura; Nagoya City Art Museum, Nagoya; Museum of Modern Art, Shiga.

1994

- Robert Mapplethorpe, Tel Aviv Museum of Art, Tel Aviv; Fundació Joan Miró, Barcelona; KunstHausWien, Vienna.

1995

- Robert Mapplethorpe, Museum of Contemporary Art, Sydney; Art Gallery of Western Australia, Perth; City Gallery Wellington, Wellington.

2004

- Robert Mapplethorpe and the Classical Tradition: Photographs and Mannerist Prints, Deutsche Guggenheim Museum, Berlin; The State Hermitage Museum, St. Petersburg.

2005

- Robert Mapplethorpe and the Classical Tradition: Photographs and Mannerist Prints, Moscow House of Photography, Moscow; Solomon R. Guggenheim Museum, New York.

2006

- Robert Mapplethorpe and the Classical Tradition: Photographs and Mannerist Prints, Guggenheim Hermitage Museum, Las Vegas.

2008

- Mapplethorpe: Polaroids, Whitney Museum of American Art, New York.

2009

- Mapplethorpe: Polaroids, Mary & Leigh Block Museum of Art, Evanston; Henry Art Gallery, Seattle.

2012

- Robert Mapplethorpe: XYZ, Los Angeles County Museum of Art, Los Angeles.
- In Focus: Robert Mapplethorpe, Getty Center, Los Angeles.

2014

- Robert Mapplethorpe, Grand Palais, Paris;

2015

- Robert Mapplethorpe, Kiasma Museum of Contemporary Art, Helsinki.
- Warhol & Mapplethorpe: Guise & Dolls, Wadsworth Atheneum, Hartford.

2016

- Robert Mapplethorpe: The Perfect Medium, Los Angeles County Museum of Art, Los Angeles; J. Paul Getty Museum, Los Angeles; Montreal Museum of Fine Arts, Montreal; Art Gallery of New South Wales, Sydney.

2018

- Robert Mapplethorpe: Pictures, Serralves, Porto.
- Robert Mapplethorpe: Choreography for an Exhibition, Museo Madre, Naples.

2019

- Implicit Tensions: Mapplethorpe Now, Solomon R. Guggenheim Museum, New York.
