= Editta Sherman =

American photographer

- Born: Editta Rinaldo; July 9, 1912; Philadelphia, Pennsylvania, U.S.
- Died: November 1, 2013 (aged 101); New York City, New York, U.S.
- Known for: Photography
- Spouse: Harold Sherman (m. 1935–1954)

Editta Sherman (née Rinaldo; July 9, 1912 – November 1, 2013) was an American photographer, often referred to as the "Duchess of Carnegie Hall", since she lived and worked in Carnegie Hall Artist Studios for over 60 years.

Originally formed as a diverse artist enclave and bohemian work-live rental studios to financially support Andrew Carnegie's struggling concert hall, Sherman's home from the 1940s until 2010 allowed her to be part of a unique artistic community of neighbours.

Her life's work consists of thousands of portrait images of celebrities, writers, poets, models, sports heroes, politicians, and many others (including many of the famed former tenants of Carnegie Hall), taken with a large format 8×10 camera.

== Life ==
Sherman was born in Philadelphia, Pennsylvania, the oldest of eight children born to Nunzio and Pierna Rinaldo, immigrants who moved to the United States from Italy in 1910. Her father operated a photography studio in New Jersey where she learned the art at a young age. Editta was married in 1935 to Harold Sherman, a sound engineer and inventor, as well as her business partner. He died at the age of 50 years, after suffering blindness and diabetes, leaving Editta with five young children to bring up as a single mother. She and her husband were instrumental in raising charity funds for the American Theatre Wing during World War II by volunteering to take portraits of Hollywood stars to aid in the American war effort.

Sherman was a muse of Andy Warhol who filmed her with filmmaker Paul Morrissey in the 1970s. She also appeared in the Abel Ferrara film Ms. 45 in 1981. She was a model as well as a photographer and was photographed by Francesco Scavullo and symbolized aging gracefully at age 60 years old in his book "On Beauty" in the 1970s. A decade-long collaboration with her longtime friend and neighbour, William J. Cunningham, a fashion photographer for The New York Times, resulted in the Fashion Institute of Technology/Penguin Books 1978 publication of their book Facades, visually detailing 200 years of fashion and New York City architecture. In November 1967 Kodak Films sponsored a solo exhibit of Editta's celebrity portraits in a three-week public show at Grand Central Terminal in Manhattan.

Sherman lived in Carnegie Hall until July 2010 and continued to work there until September 2010, having become an icon for renter's rights and affordable housing for the elderly in fighting eviction against the City of New York, the current owner of Carnegie Hall. All former residents have now relocated, and The Carnegie Hall Corporation plans to demolish the commercial and residential studios — which in their 1950s Bohemian heyday numbered as many as 170 — to create educational and rehearsal space for the hall. The $200 million project is to be completed in 2014.

In a 2010 interview on "The Nate Berkus" show, Sherman said she wanted to live to be 100. Her wish was fulfilled on July 9, 2012, when she celebrated her 100th birthday. The very next year, on November 1, she died at 101.

== Sources ==
- Robbins, Liz (August 27, 2010). "In Apartments Above Carnegie Hall, a Coda for Longtime Residents". The New York Times.
- Cynthia R. Fagen (October 25, 2009). "Carnegie Gall- Gran, 97, fights eviction". New York Post. Archived from the original on October 28, 2009.
- Ed Pilkington (October 9, 2009). "Artists' colony fights plan to convert Carnegie Hall studios". Guardian.co.uk. London.
- Philip Stavrou (January 9, 2009). "96-year-old fights to keep $600/month NYC apartment". CTV CANADA.
- Erik Shilling and Clemente Lisi (December 30, 2008). "GRANNY IS MAD AS HALL". NEW YORK POST. Archived from the original on January 11, 2009.
- Ashley Fantz (December 29, 2008). "Duchess of Carnegie, 96, refuses to leave home". CNN.
- Alex Chadwick (November 7, 2008). "'Duchess' Demands $10M To Leave Carnegie Hall". NPR.
- Bob Delmonteque (2007). "Photographer to the Stars". Journal of Longevity. Archived from the original on January 24, 2008.
