= Philip Gefter =

American author and photography critic

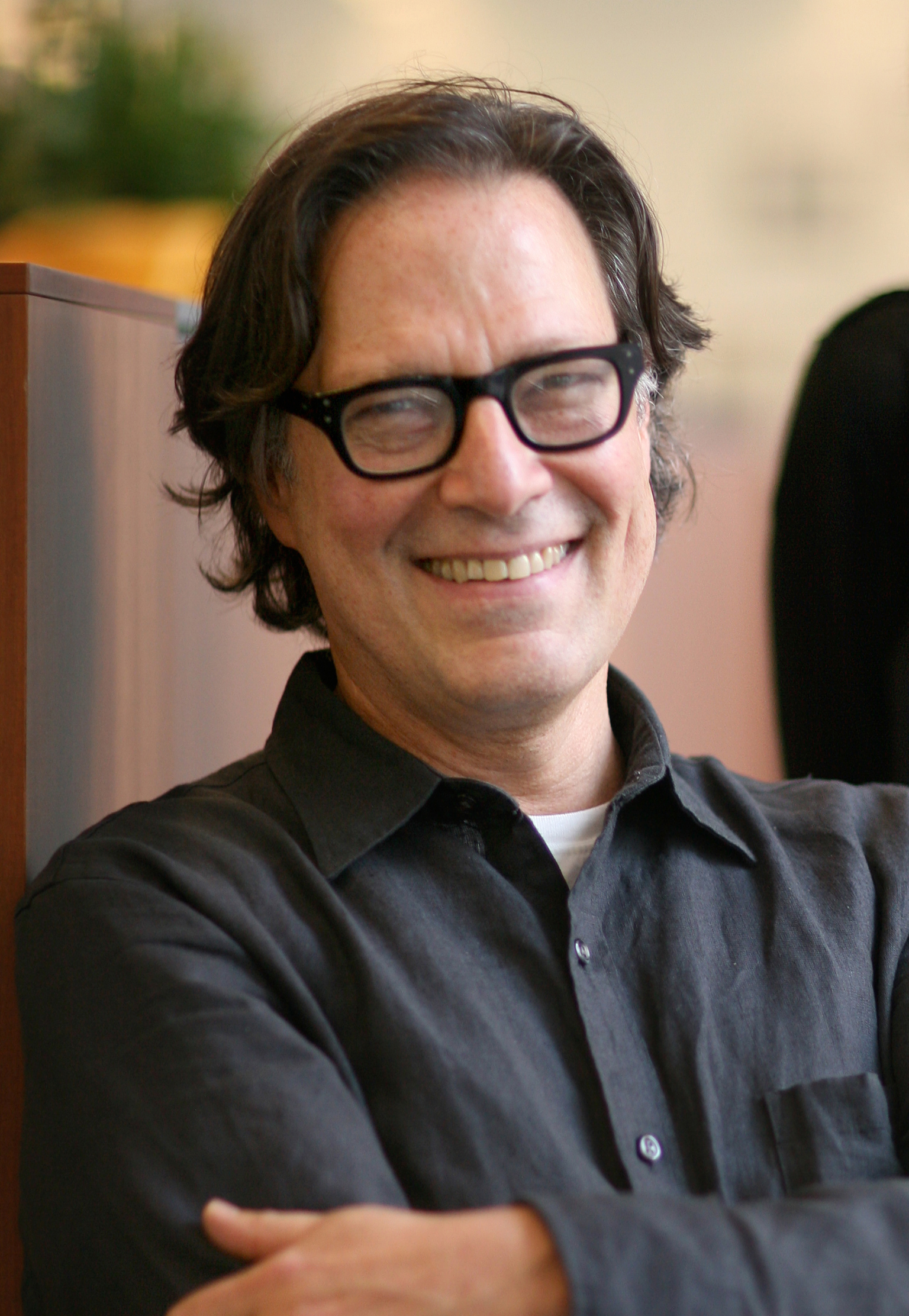
- Education: Pratt Institute
- Spouse: Richard Press
- Writing career
- Genre: non-fiction
- Subject: arts

Philip Gefter is an American photography critic and the author of four books: Cocktails with George and Martha: Movies, Marriage, and the Making of Who's Afraid of Virginia Woolf? (2024); two biographies: What Becomes A Legend Most (2020), the biography of Richard Avedon and Wagstaff: Before and After Mapplethorpe (2014), the biography of Sam Wagstaff, for which he received the 2014 Marfield Prize, the national award for arts writing; and Photography After Frank (2009), a book of essays. He was on staff at The New York Times for over fifteen years, both as a picture editor and photography critic. He produced the 2011 documentary film, Bill Cunningham New York.

== Life ==
Gefter received a fine arts degree from the Pratt Institute in painting and photography. He began his career as a picture researcher in the Time-Life Picture Collection, which exposed him to the photographs of Walker Evans, Margaret Bourke-White, Robert Capa, W. Eugene Smith, Gordon Parks, and Alfred Eisenstaedt, among other consequential photographers. Following that, he took a job at Aperture Foundation, where, as assistant editor, he worked on the Aperture History of Photography series and on publications such as Edward Weston: Nudes; America and Lewis Hine; and the re-publication of Robert Frank's The Americans.

From 1992 until 2016, he was on staff at The New York Times as a picture editor, becoming the Page One Picture Editor from 1999 until 2003, and, then, as a picture editor in Culture, writing about photography as a critic for the paper.

In 2002, he was part of a newsroom team that won two Pulitzer Prizes for coverage of 9/11-- one for news photography and one for feature photography.

In 2003, he and Richard Press (who were married in 2008) commissioned the architect, Michael Bell, to build a house for them in New York State's Hudson Valley. The Gefter-Press House, completed in 2007, is included in the book, American Masterworks: Houses of the Twentieth and Twenty First Centuries (Rizzoli), by the architectural historian, Kenneth Frampton.

In 2011, he and Richard Press released their feature-length documentary film Bill Cunningham New York, about The New York Times photographer Bill Cunningham.

As a part-time educator, Gefter was on the graduate faculty in the photography program at the San Francisco Art Institute in the late 1980s; as adjunct faculty teaching the history of photography in the Tisch School of the Arts at New York University in the early 1990s; and, as adjunct faculty teaching the history of photography in the photography program at the School of Visual Arts in the early 2000s, continuing his association with SVA in the Mentor's Program until 2014..

In 2025, Gefter's papers were acquired by the Beinecke Library at Yale University, including his writings, his journals, personal papers, correspondence, photographs, drawings, printed material, and artifacts.

== Gay rights ==
Beginning in the early 1970s, Gefter was active in the gay rights movement, in the Gay Activists Alliance; Gay Academic Union; and Gay Media Coalition. He coauthored and was a subject of a book about his same-sex relationship, Lovers: The Story of Two Men (Avon, 1979). In 1981, he was a founding member of the Gay Men's Health Crisis, formed in Larry Kramer's living room when the earliest cases of HIV/AIDS (still then yet to be named) were reported. In 1991, he was a founding member of the New York chapter of the National Lesbian and Gay Journalists Association, serving as chapter president from 1993 to 1995.

== Publications ==
=== Publications by Gefter ===
- Photography After Frank (New York: Aperture, 2009) ISBN 978-1597110952
- Wagstaff: Before And After Mapplethorpe (New York: Liveright, 2014) ISBN 978-0871404374
- George Dureau: The Photographs (New York: Aperture, 2016) ISBN 978-1597112840
- What Becomes a Legend Most: A Biography of Richard Avedon (New York: Harper, 2020) ISBN 978-0062442710
- Cocktails with George and Martha: Movies, Marriage, and the Making of Who's Afraid of Virginia Woolf? (New York: Bloomsbury 2024) ISBN 9781635579628

=== Publications with others ===
- Lovers: The Story of Two Men (Avon Books, 1979) ISBN 978-0380430918

=== Publications with contributions by Gefter ===
- "Introduction," About Face (San Francisco: Pier 24, 2013)
- "Who's American Dream Is It?" Larry Sultan: Here and Home (Los Angeles: Los Angeles County Museum of Art, 2014)
- "Nature Mort," Thomas Ruff (London: Gagosian Gallery, 2015)
- "Flesh and Spirit: Robert Mapplethorpe, Sam Wagstaff and the Gay Sensibility," Robert Mapplethorpe: The Perfect Medium (Los Angeles: J. Paul Getty Museum, 2016)
- "Peter Hujar: Eros, C'est La Vie," Peter Hujar: Speed of Light (J.P. Morgan Museum and Library; Fundación Mapfre, 2017)
- "View from the Judgment Seat," Aperture Conversations, edited by Melissa Harris (Aperture, 2018)
- "Richard Learoyd: The Subject Versus the Figure," Richard Learoyd: 2018–2007 (Aperture and Fundación Mapfre, 2019)
- "Bill Gedney," William Gedney: A Time of Youth, (Duke University Press, 2020)
- "The Subject and the Image," Looking Forward (San Francisco: Pier 24, 2022)
- "Deepdiving," Swimmers: Larry Sultan (Mack, 2023)
- "Cherry Grove: The Temptations of Richard Avedon" and "Apollo and Dionysus at the Beach: Sam Wagstaff and Robert Mapplethorpe," Fire Island Art: 100 Years (Phaidon/The Monacelli Press, 2026)

== Awards ==
- 2011: Museum Scholar residency, The J. Paul Getty Museum, Los Angeles
- 2014: Marfield Prize for Wagstaff: Before and After Mapplethorpe
- 2024: Theater Library Association's Richard Wall Memorial Award Special Jury Prize for Cocktails with George and Martha.

== Bibliography ==
- Reports From the Holocaust. St. Martin's Press. 1994. By Larry Kramer. ISBN 978-0312026349.
- The Gay Metropolis. Houghton Mifflin, 1997. By Charles Kaiser. ISBN 978-0802143174.
