= James Crump =

American film director

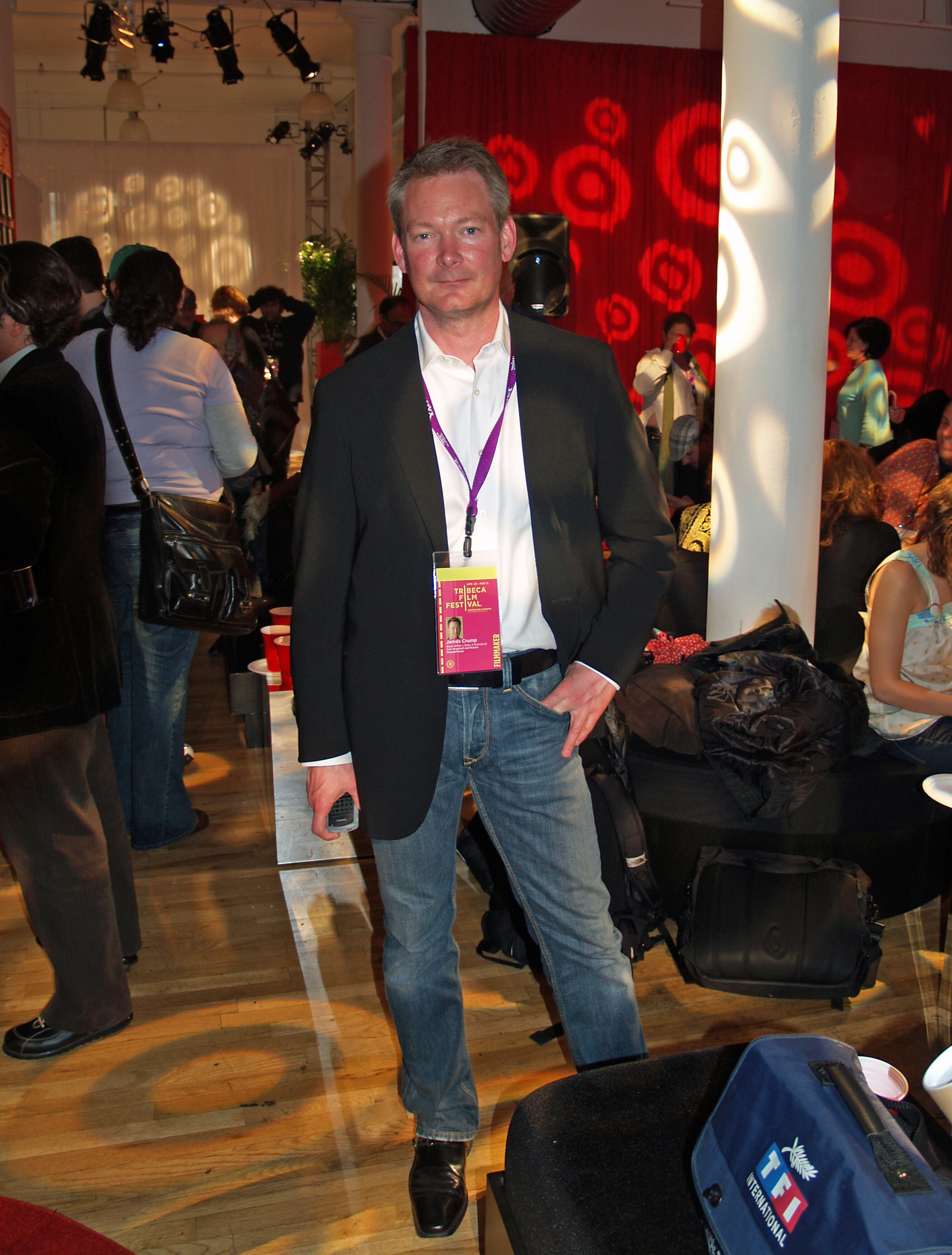
- Education: Indiana University Bloomington; University of New Mexico
- Occupations: Director; producer; writer
- Years active: 2004–present
- Notable work: Black White + Gray, Troublemakers: The Story of Land Art, Antonio Lopez 1970: Sex Fashion & Disco

James Crump is an American film director, writer, producer, art historian and curator. His films include Black White + Gray: A Portrait of Sam Wagstaff and Robert Mapplethorpe; Troublemakers: The Story of Land Art; and Antonio Lopez 1970: Sex Fashion & Disco.

An art historian and curator, Crump is also the author, co-author and editor of books and has published in the fields of modern and contemporary art. He has contributed to a host of art publications including ArtReview, Art in America, Artforum and Archives of American Art Journal for the Smithsonian Museum, among others.

== Career ==
Crump earned a Master of Arts and PhD in history of art respectively at Indiana University (1993) and University of New Mexico (1996). From 1997 to 2002, he was publisher of Arena Editions, an illustrated book publisher of photography and modern and contemporary art. From 2008 to 2013, Crump was chief curator and curator of photography at the Cincinnati Art Museum. He has collaborated with a host of museums and galleries, including Martin-Gropius-Bau, Berlin, Hammer Museum, Los Angeles, the Grey Art Gallery of NYU, Princeton University Art Museum and Huis Marseille, Amsterdam. He has organized exhibitions or published books with James Welling, Doug and Mike Starn, Nan Goldin, Ross Bleckner, Lynn Davis, and the estates of Berenice Abbott, Robert Mapplethorpe, Carlo Mollino, Willem de Kooning, Garry Winogrand, and Walker Evans.

== Filmography ==
=== Black White + Gray: A Portrait of Sam Wagstaff and Robert Mapplethorpe ===
Crump directed the feature-length documentary film Black White + Gray: A Portrait of Sam Wagstaff and Robert Mapplethorpe, which premiered in North America at the 2007 Tribeca Film Festival and in Europe at Art Basel. It explores the influence curator Sam Wagstaff, photographer Robert Mapplethorpe and musician/poet Patti Smith had on art in New York City in the 1970s. It began airing on the Sundance Channel in March 2008.

=== Troublemakers: The Story of Land Art ===
Crump wrote, produced and directed Troublemakers: The Story of Land Art. Set in the desolate desert spaces of the American southwest, this feature documentary film unearths the history of land art during the tumultuous late 1960s and early 1970s. Troublemakers was one of twelve documentary films selected by the 53rd New York Film Festival, September 25–October 11, 2015. The film released theatrically at IFC Center, New York, January 8, 2016.

=== Antonio Lopez 1970: Sex Fashion & Disco ===
Written, produced and directed by Crump, this documentary film concerns Antonio Lopez (1943–1987), the Puerto Rican-born, Harlem- and Bronx-raised, bisexual fashion illustrator of 1970s New York and Paris, and his colorful and sometimes outrageous milieu. Antonio Lopez 1970: Sex Fashion & Disco premiered at the 2017 BFI London Film Festival and subsequently was awarded the 2017 DOC NYC Metropolis Grand Jury Prize and the 2018 Cinéfashion Film Award for Best Fashion Feature Film. The film released theatrically in the United States at IFC Center, New York, September 14, 2018, Laemmle Theatres Royal Theatre, Los Angeles, September 21, 2018, and over twenty other major US markets It became available on iTunes Store, Amazon Prime Video and Vudu January 2019 and subsequently began airing on the premium cable and satellite television network Starz May 2019. The film qualified for consideration for the 2018 Academy Awards Oscar for Best Documentary Feature.

=== Spit Earth: Who Is Jordan Wolfson? ===
Spit Earth: Who Is Jordan Wolfson? is a feature documentary which Artnet News called a "searing psychological portrait" of the artist. The film was an official selection of the 2020 Festival International du Livre d'Art et du Film, Perpignan, France and the 2020 Lo schermo dell'arte Film Festival, Florence, Italy. Due to the Impact of the COVID-19 pandemic on cinema, the film was released worldwide on May 1, 2020, on the leading streaming platforms.

=== Breuer's Bohemia ===
Breuer's Bohemia is a documentary film that examines the Jewish-born Hungarian architect Marcel Breuer's experimental house designs in New England following the Second World War. The film features rare interviews and footage of Breuer, artist Alexander Calder, playwright and essayist Arthur Miller and others from their storied milieu. Breuer's Bohemia is accompanied by a companion book published by The Monacelli Press.

== Film Awards ==
| Year | Group | Award | Result | Film |
|---|---|---|---|---|
| 2017 | DOC NYC | Metropolis Grand Jury Prize | Won | Antonio Lopez 1970: Sex Fashion & Disco |

== Publications ==
=== Books (as author) ===
- (2021) Breuer's Bohemia, The Monacelli Press/Phaidon Press. ISBN 978-1580935784.
- (2013) James Welling: Monograph. Aperture. ISBN 978-1597112093
- (2012) Doug and Mike Starn: Gravity of Light. Skira Rizzoli. ISBN 978-0-8478-3897-4.
- (2010) Walker Evans: Decade by Decade. Hatje Cantz. ISBN 978-3-7757-2491-3.
- (2009) Variety: Photographs by Nan Goldin. Skira Rizzoli. ISBN 978-0-8478-3255-2.
- (2007) Albert Watson. Phaidon Press Limited. ISBN 978-0-7148-4755-9.
- (1995) F. Holland Day: Suffering the Ideal. Twin Palms Publishers. ISBN 978-0-944092-33-0.
- (1993) George Platt Lynes: Photographs from the Kinsey Institute. Bulfinch Press/Little Brown & Co. ISBN 978-0-8212-1996-6.

=== Books (as co-author) ===
- (2025) Gerald Incandela, 12 Candles Press. ISBN 979-8-218-78271-9.
- (2014) Carlo Mollino: Polaroids, second edition. Damiani. ISBN 978-8862083782.
- (2013) It's Modern: The Eye and Visual Influence of Alexander Liberman. Rizzoli. ISBN 978-0847840717.
- (2012) Herb Ritts: L.A. Style. J. Paul Getty Museum. ISBN 978-1-60606-100-8.
- (2011) High Heels: Fashion, Femininity and Seduction. Thames & Hudson. ISBN 978-0-500-51572-3.
- (2010) Starburst: Color Photography in America 1970–1980. Hatje Cantz. ISBN 978-3-7757-2490-6.
- (2004) Meridel Rubenstein: Belonging: Los Alamos to Vietnam. St. Ann's Press. ISBN 978-0-9753302-0-3.
- (1998) When We Were Three: The Travel Albums of George Platt Lynes, Monroe Wheeler and Glenway Wescott. Arena Editions. ISBN 978-0-9657280-4-1.
- (1994) Harm's Way: Lust & Madness, Murder & Mayhem. Twin Palms Publishers. ISBN 978-0-944092-28-6.

=== Select books (as editor/publisher) ===
- (2002) Peter Lindbergh: Stories. Arena Editions. ISBN 978-1892041647.
- (2002) Garry Winogrand: 1964. Arena Editions. ISBN 978-1-892041-62-3.
- (2002) Berenice Abbott/Eugène Atget. Arena Editions. ISBN 978-1-892041-63-0.
- (2002) Carlo Mollino: Polaroids. Arena Editions. ISBN 978-1-892041-60-9.
- (2001) Robert Mapplethorpe: Autoportrait. Arena Editions. ISBN 978-1-892041-41-8.
- (2001) Richard Misrach: Golden Gate. Arena Editions. ISBN 978-1-892041-41-8.
- (2000) Steve McQueen: Photographs by William Claxton. Arena Editions. ISBN 978-1-892041319.
- (2000) Steve Shapiro: American Edge. Arena Editions. ISBN 978-1892041371.
- (2000) Melvin Sokolsky: Seeing Fashion. Arena Editions. ISBN 978-1892041364.
- (2000) Richard Misrach: Sky Book. Arena Editions. ISBN 978-1-892041-28-9.
- (2000) Walker Evans: The Lost Work. Arena Editions. ISBN 978-1-892041-29-6.
- (1999) Bruce Weber: Chop Suey Club. Arena Editions. ISBN 978-1-892041-19-7.
- (1999) Peter Beard: Fifty Years of Portraits. Arena Editions. ISBN 978-1-892041-15-9.
- (1999) Robert Mapplethorpe: Pictures. Arena Editions. ISBN 978-1-892041-16-6.
- (1998) Gerard Malanga: Resistance to Memory. Arena Editions. ISBN 978-0965728065.
- (1998) When We Were Three: The Travel Albums of George Platt Lynes, Monroe Wheeler and Glenway Wescott. Arena Editions. ISBN 978-0-9657280-4-1.
- (1998) Ross Bleckner: Watercolor. Arena Editions. ISBN 978-0-9657280-9-6.
- (1998) Lynn Davis: Monument. Arena Editions. ISBN 978-1-892041-07-4.
- (1998) Willem de Kooning: Drawing Seeing/Seeing Drawing. Arena Editions. ISBN 978-0-9657280-8-9
- (1998) Vik Muniz: Seeing is Believing. Arena Editions. ISBN 978-1-892041-00-5.
- (1997) Adam Fuss. Arena Editions. ISBN 978-1-891024-91-7.
