= Les Acteurs de bonne foi =

1749 play by Pierre de Marivaux

- Original language: French
- Written by: Pierre de Marivaux

Premiere
- Date: 30 October 1749
- Place: France

Les Acteurs de bonne foi is a comedy in one act and in prose written by French playwright Pierre de Marivaux and performed for the first time on 30 October 1749. Les Acteurs de bonne foi was produced by the Comédie-Française but was not a success. Marivaux published it in the Conservateur journal in November 1757. The play is built on the dialogue the author established with the reader through the mise en abyme device. In effect, the text features interviews with the actors, discussion about the possibilities of staging, and lines from a play that is to be performed. Les Acteurs de bonne foi is the last play Marivaux had performed in a large theatre; it is a hybrid text where comedy quickly leads to confusion between reality and the play, with the mise en abyme highlighting the importance of dramatic illusion.

== Characters ==
- Madam Argante, Angélique's mother.
- Madam Amelin, Éraste's aunt.
- Araminte, a friend of theirs.
- Éraste, Madam Amelin's nephew and Angélique's lover.
- Angélique, Madam Argante's daughter.
- Merlin, Éraste's servant and Lisette's lover.
- Lisette, Angélique's servant.
- Blaise, Madam Argante's farmer's son and Colette's lover.
- Colette, gardener's daughter.
- A Solicitor

== Plot ==
On the day of Angélique and Éraste's wedding, Merlin improvises a comedy with other actors

== Bibliography ==
- (in French) Eric Eigenmann, « Monnaie de la pièce : Les Acteurs de bonne foi de Marivaux », Être riche au siècle de Voltaire, pp. 349–361. Geneva: Droz, 1996.
- (in French) Brigitte Girard, « La Logique marivaudienne dans Les Acteurs de bonne foi », Travaux sur le XVIII^{e}, pp. 75–86.Angers: Université d’Angers, U. E. R. des Lettres et Sciences Humaines, 1978.
