= Sam Wagstaff =

American art curator and collector (1921–1987)

- Born: Samuel Jones Wagstaff Jr. November 4, 1921; New York City, U.S.
- Died: January 14, 1987 (aged 65); New York City, U.S.
- Education: Hotchkiss School
- Alma mater: Yale University; Institute of Fine Arts
- Known for: Curator, collector

Samuel Jones Wagstaff Jr. (November 4, 1921 – January 14, 1987) was an American art curator and collector. He was the artistic mentor and benefactor of photographer Robert Mapplethorpe and poet-punk rocker Patti Smith. Wagstaff is known in part for his support of minimalism, pop art, conceptual art, and earthworks, but his aesthetic acceptance and support of photography presaged the acceptance of the medium as a fine art.

== Early life ==
Samuel Wagstaff was born on November 4, 1921, in New York City. Wagstaff, a grandson of New York State Senator Alfred Wagstaff Jr., was the son of Samuel J. Wagstaff Sr., a wealthy lawyer from an old Social Register family, and his second wife, Olga May, born May Emilia Piorkowska (or Piorkowski) in New York in 1894, a fashion illustrator who had worked for Harper's Bazaar and Vogue and was previously married to Arthur Paul Thomas. He had one sibling, a sister, Judith (Mrs. Thomas Lewis Jefferson). His parents divorced in 1932, and Wagstaff's mother, a daughter of Polish inventor and scientist Col. Arthur Emil Piorkowski, married Donald V. Newhall, an artist.

After growing up on Central Park South, attending the Hotchkiss School and graduating from Yale University, and being a fixture on the debutante circuit, Wagstaff joined the US Navy in 1941 as an ensign, where he took part in the D-day landing at Omaha Beach in World War II. He later worked in the field of advertising in the 1950s, which he hated. He returned to school to study Renaissance art at the New York University Institute of Fine Arts, however, and turned his energies to the art world.

== Career ==
In 1959, a David E. Finley art history fellowship took him to the National Gallery of Art in Washington, DC. He served as curator of contemporary art at the Wadsworth Atheneum in Hartford, Connecticut, from 1961 to 1968. In January 1964, he organized the show Black White + Gray, choosing exhibits presenting what he described as "the sparse aesthetic shared by a number of artists whose work was pared down to a minimum". It is now often referred to as the first survey of Minimalist Art. In 1968, when he was not chosen for the position of museum director, Wagstaff left Hartford for the Detroit Institute of Arts staying to 1971. In addition to his curatorial work, Wagstaff was a noted collector, just like his father, who collected ephemera. After a conflict with the Detroit Institute of Arts' board of trustees over an earthwork by Michael Heizer, which had destroyed the immaculate museum lawn, he moved back to New York.

After meeting Robert Mapplethorpe in 1972 and seeing the exhibition The Painterly Photograph, 1890-1914 at the Metropolitan Museum of Art in 1973, Wagstaff became convinced that photographs were the most unrecognized and, possibly, the most valuable works of art. As Mapplethorpe's patron, Wagstaff played an important role in advancing his career. He persuaded gallerist Holly Solomon to represent Mapplethorpe, and she later acknowledged that she "wouldn't have touched Robert without Sam." When Solomon exhibited Mapplethorpe's portraits in February 1977, Wagstaff helped install the exhibition and purchased several photographs in support of both the artist and the gallery.

Wagstaff began selling his collection of paintings, using the proceeds to buy 19th-century American, British, and French photography. Then, influenced by Mapplethorpe, Wagstaff's taste veered toward the daring, and he began to depart from established names in search of new talent. His collection was soon recognized as one of the finest private holdings in the United States. In 1984 Wagstaff's photography collection went to the J. Paul Getty Museum, for a reported price in the neighborhood of $5 million.

Saying that he needed the challenge of building another collection, Wagstaff turned to 19th-century American silver. A show of more than 100 examples from his silver collection opened on March 20, 1987, at the New-York Historical Society.

Between 1976 and 1986, Wagstaff donated his personal papers to the Archives of American Art, Smithsonian Institution. In 2008, the bulk of these papers were digitized and made available online (see the Samuel J. Wagstaff Papers, 1932–1985).

== Personal life ==
Wagstaff met photographer Robert Mapplethorpe in 1972 at a party, beginning a close relationship that would last until Wagstaff's death, described as "first a kind of marriage, sexual and artistic, then a friendship." Mapplethorpe, whom Wagstaff called his shy pornographer, was also his guide to the gay demimonde of extreme sex and drugs that flourished in New York in the 1970s and 1980s. In the autumn of 1972, Wagstaff gave Mapplethorpe $15,000 to purchase a loft at 24 Bond Street, where the photographer lived and used as his studio. In the 1980s, Wagstaff gave Mapplethorpe $500,000 to purchase a bigger loft at 35 West 23rd Street.

== Death ==
Wagstaff died of pneumonia arising from AIDS at his home in Manhattan on January 14, 1987. Under Wagstaff's will, Robert Mapplethorpe inherited three-quarters of his estate, worth upward of $7 million, and Wagstaff's lover Jim Nelson received the remaining quarter, while Wagstaff's sister Judith Jefferson was left $10,000. Jefferson contested the will, delaying distribution of the estate. As executor, Mapplethorpe administered the estate and arranged the sale of Wagstaff's penthouse.

== Legacy ==
A fund in Wagstaff's name for the purchase of photographs was started in 1987 at the Metropolitan Museum of Art by art dealer Daniel Wolf.

In 2007, James Crump directed the documentary film Black White + Gray, which premiered at the 2007 Tribeca Film Festival. In his New York Times review of the film, critic Stephen Holden wrote: "Because Mapplethorpe's story is already familiar, the movie devotes most of its time to Wagstaff, whose personal history is a classic case of repressed or closeted homosexuality belatedly and furiously unleashed."

In 2014, Wagstaff: Before and After Mapplethorpe, a biography of Wagstaff, by Philip Gefter, was published by Norton/Liveright, and won the 2014 Marfield Prize for Arts Writing.

In 2022, Zachary Quinto played a character in American Horror Story: NYC named Sam Jones who is loosely inspired by Wagstaff's life as an art curator, his relationship with Mapplethorpe, and his death from HIV/AIDS.
