= Philippe Garner =

French art dealer (born 1949)

Philippe Daniel Garner
- Born: 1949 (age 76–77); Aix-en-Provence, France
- Occupation: Photographer
- Website: www.philippegarner.com

Philippe Daniel Garner (born 1949) is a British expert on photography.

== Early life ==
Garner was born in Aix-en-Provence, France where his grandmother lived, and was raised in Brighton, UK.

== Career ==
Garner joined Sotheby's Auctioneers and in 1971 took charge of the Art Nouveau and Art Deco department. The same year he held the first specialist auction of photography in the United Kingdom. After thirty years he joined Phillips, de Pury & Luxembourg in July 2002 with the position of Worldwide Director of Photographs and 20th and 21st Century Design. He joined Christie's in 2004 as their international head of photographs and 20th century decorative arts and design. He retired from Christie's on 31 May 2016.

Garner has written extensively about 20th century photography and curated a number of exhibitions.

== Awards ==
In 2011 he was given the Royal Photographic Society's Award for Outstanding Service to Photography and in 2004 he was awarded an Honorary Fellowship of The Society.

== Publications ==
- Art Nouveau for Collectors. Hamlyn, 1974.
- The World of Edwardiana. Hamlyn, 1974.
- Emile Gallé. Academy, 1976.
- Glass 1900: Tiffany Gallé Lalique. Thames & Hudson, 1979.
- A Century of Chair Design. Academy, 1980. With Frank Russell and John Read.
- Twentieth-Century Furniture. Academy, 1980.
- The Contemporary Decorative Arts. Phaidon, 1980.
- Emile Gallé: Collection N. El Fituri. Published privately, 1982.
- Twentieth-Century Style & Design. Thames and Hudson, 1986. With Stephen Bayley and Deyan.
- Eileen Gray: Designer and Architect. Taschen, 1993.
- Cecil Beaton. Schirmer Mosel, Munich, and Jonathan Cape, London, 1994.
- Sixties Design. Taschen, 1996.
- Cecil Beaton: The Dandy Photographer. British Council, 1997.
- John Cowan: Through the Light Barrier. Victoria and Albert Museum, Schirmer/Mosel, 1999.
- A Seaside Album. Philip Wilson, 2003.
- Guy Bourdin. Gallimard, 2004. Edited by Garner.
- Antonioni's Blow-Up. Steidl, 2010. With David Alan Mellor.
- Radical / Sublime. Published privately, 2020.
- Jill Kennington Model Years. Unicorn, 2021.
- Multiple Exposures: Allen Jones & Photography. ACC, 2022.
