= Bill Cunningham (American photographer) =

American photographer (1929–2016)

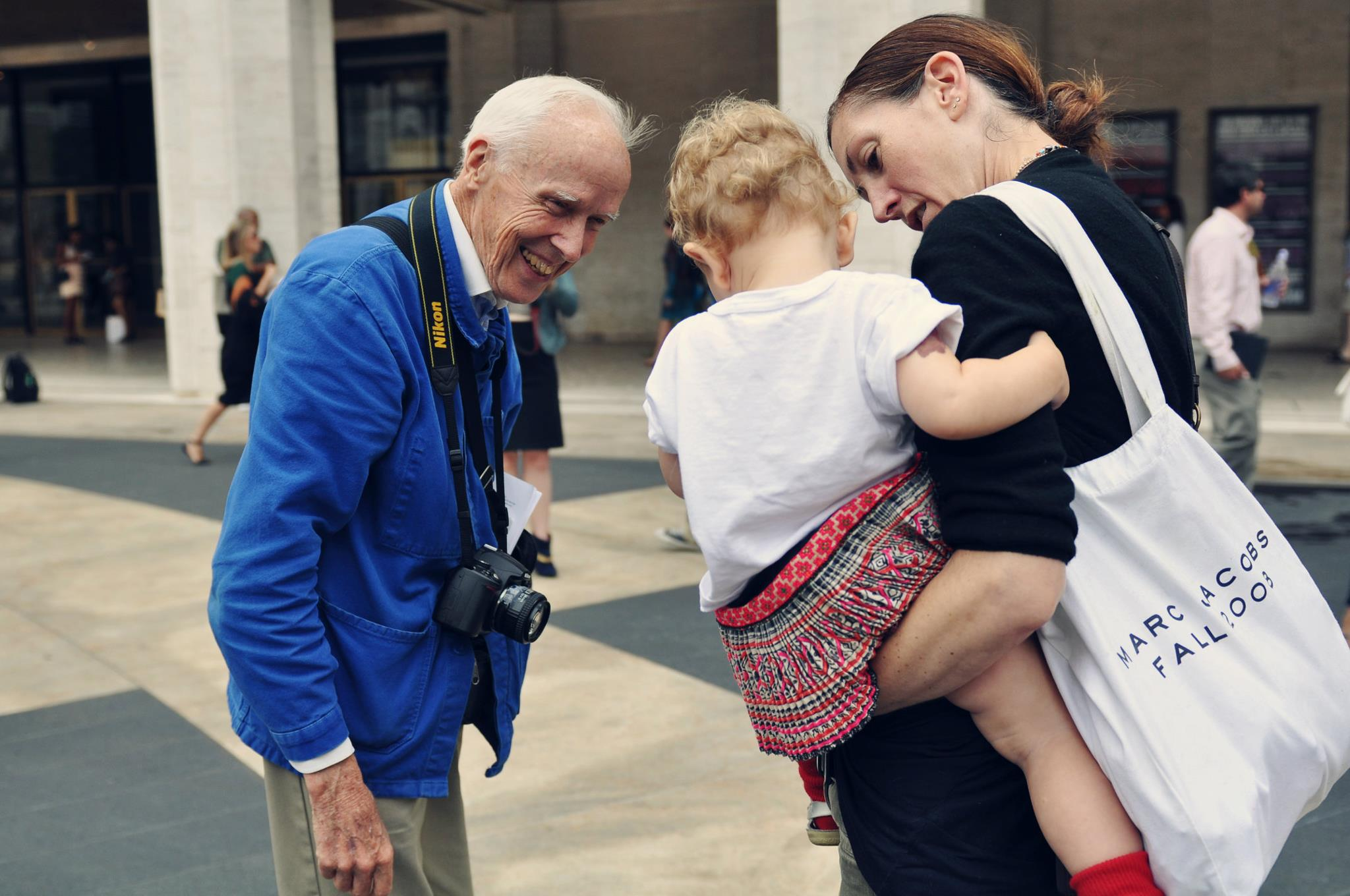
- Cunningham at New York Fashion Week 2011
- Born: William John Cunningham Jr. March 13, 1929; Boston, Massachusetts, U.S.
- Died: June 25, 2016 (aged 87); New York City, U.S.
- Education: Harvard University (dropped out)
- Occupation: Photographer
- Employer: The New York Times
- Known for: Fashion photography Street photography Millinery

William John Cunningham Jr. (March 13, 1929 – June 25, 2016) was an American fashion photographer for The New York Times, known for his candid and street photography.

A Harvard University dropout, he first became known as a designer of women's hats before moving on to writing about fashion for Women's Wear Daily and the Chicago Tribune. He began taking candid photographs on the streets of New York City, and his work came to the attention of The New York Times with a 1978 capture of Greta Garbo in an unguarded moment. Cunningham reported for the paper from 1978 to 2016.

Cunningham was hospitalized for a stroke in New York City in June 2016 and died soon after.

== Early life and education ==
William John Cunningham Jr. was born into an Irish Catholic family and raised in Boston. He never lost his Boston accent. He had two sisters and a younger brother. His parents were religious and used corporal punishment. He had his first exposure to the fashion world as a stockboy in Bonwit Teller's Boston Store. He later said his interest in fashion began in church: "I could never concentrate on Sunday church services because I'd be concentrating on women's hats." After attending Harvard University on scholarship for two months, he dropped out in 1948 and moved to New York City at the age of 19, where he worked again at Bonwit Teller, this time in the advertising department. Not long after, he quit his job and struck out on his own, making hats under the name "William J". He was drafted during the Korean War and was stationed in France, where he had his first exposure to French fashion. After serving a tour in the U.S. Army, he returned to New York in 1953 and his work as a milliner. In 1958, a New York Times critic wrote that he had "cornered the face-framing market with some of the most extraordinarily pretty cocktail hats ever imagined". He also worked for Chez Ninon, a couture salon that made line-for-line duplicates of designs by Chanel, Givenchy, and Dior. His clients in the 1950s included Marilyn Monroe, Katharine Hepburn, Rebekah Harkness, and future First Lady Jacqueline Bouvier. Encouraged by his clients, he started writing, first for Women's Wear Daily and then for the Chicago Tribune. He closed his hat shop in 1962. Following the assassination of President Kennedy in 1963, Jacqueline Kennedy sent Cunningham a red Balenciaga suit she had bought at Chez Ninon. He dyed it black and she wore it to the funeral.

== Career ==
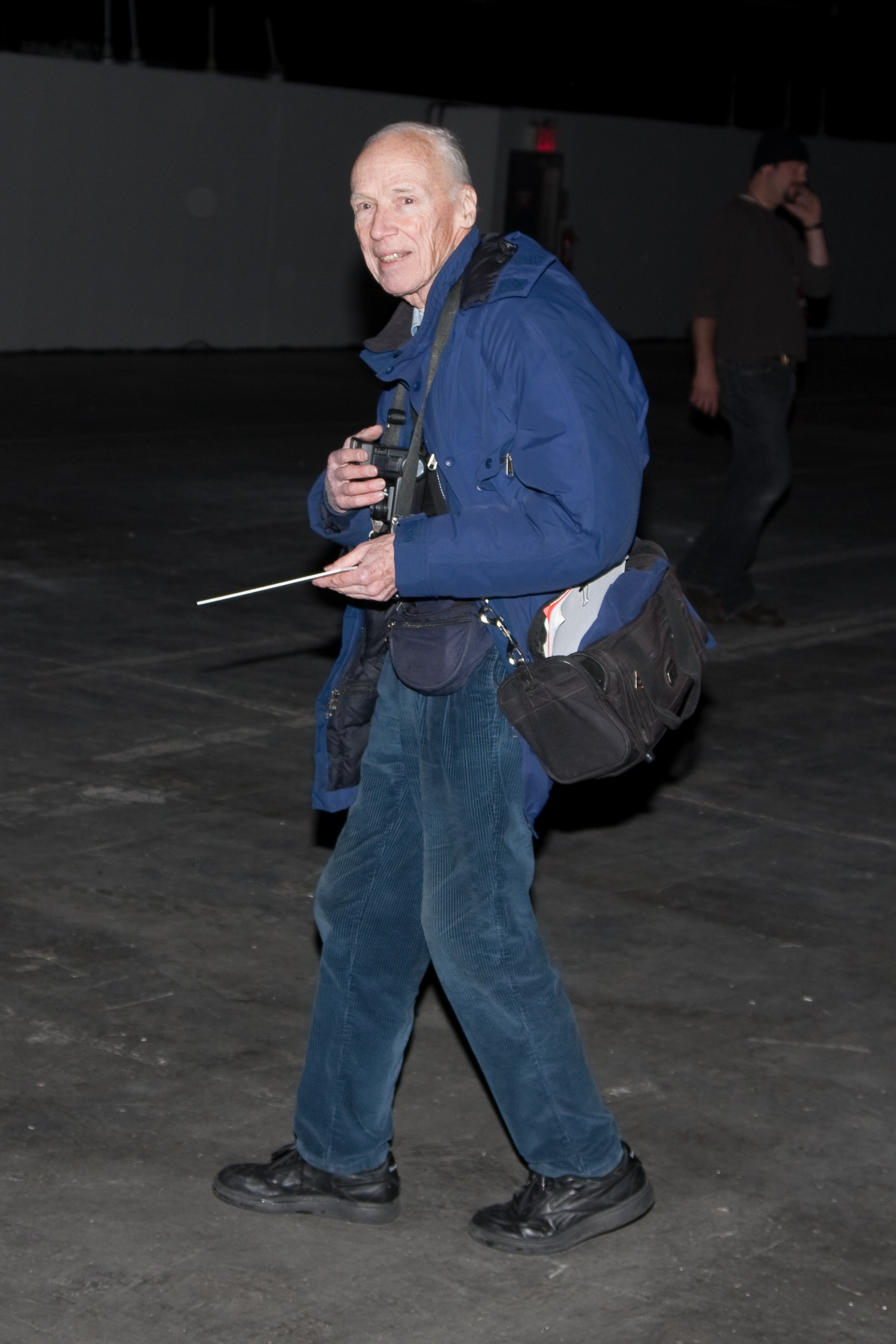
Cunningham in 2010

Cunningham contributed significantly to fashion journalism, introducing American audiences to Azzedine Alaïa and Jean Paul Gaultier. While working at Women's Wear Daily and the Chicago Tribune, he began taking candid photographs of fashion on the streets of New York. He was a self-taught photographer. He took one such photograph of Greta Garbo, though he later said he had not recognized her while photographing her nutria coat: "I thought: 'Look at the cut of that shoulder. It's so beautiful.' All I had noticed was the coat, and the shoulder."

In 1977, Cunningham contributed a photo style feature to the SoHo Weekly News. He then published a group of impromptu pictures in the New York Times in December 1978, which soon became the regular series On the Street. His editor at the New York Times, Arthur Gelb, called these photographs "a turning point for the Times, because it was the first time the paper had run pictures of well-known people without getting their permission." Cunningham nevertheless joked about his role at the paper: "I'm just the fluff. I fill around the ads, if we have any." Although then-executive editor A. M. Rosenthal was virulently homophobic and consciously neglected coverage of the LGBT community during this period (precipitating editorial conflicts with the likes of fellow Pulitzer Prize winner Sydney Schanberg), Cunningham helped to subvert this stance by photographing a fundraising event in the Fire Island Pines in 1979 and letting the perceptive reader interpret his photos without verbal clues. Following Rosenthal's retirement from the role in 1988, Cunningham was able to integrate AIDS benefits, pride parades and Wigstock into his coverage.

Cunningham's most notable columns in the Times, On the Street and Evening Hours, ran in the paper from February 26, 1989 until shortly before his death in 2016. For his society fashion column Evening Hours, he attended high society events such as the prestigious International Debutante Ball at the Waldorf-Astoria Hotel to select a few debutantes with the most fashionable, beautiful and elegant gowns to appear in his column. For On the Street, Cunningham photographed people and the passing scene in the streets of Manhattan, often at the corner Fifth Avenue and 57th Street, which The New York Times called Cunningham's "main perch". As he worked, his focus was on clothing as personal expression. He did not photograph people in the manner of paparazzi, preferring genuine personal style to celebrity. He once explained why he was not joining a group of photographers who swarmed around Catherine Deneuve: "But she isn't wearing anything interesting." Late in life he explained: "I am not fond of photographing women who borrow dresses. I prefer parties where women spend their own money and wear their own dresses.... When you spend your own money, you make a different choice." Instead, wrote Hilton Als in The New Yorker, "He loved 'the kids,' he said, who wore their souls on sleeves he had never seen before, or in quite that way." He was uninterested in those who showcased clothing they had not chosen themselves, which they modeled on the red carpet at celebrity events. Most of his pictures, he said, were never published. His fashion philosophy was populist and democratic:

Fashion is as vital and as interesting today as ever. I know what people with a more formal attitude mean when they say they're horrified by what they see on the street. But fashion is doing its job. It's mirroring exactly our times.

He wrote fashion criticism and published photo essays in Details, beginning with six pages in its first issue in March 1985 and rising to many more. (Note: One source says the magazine "once devoted more than 40 pages to his pictures". Another says "he’d sometimes have over 100 pages".) He was part owner of the magazine for a time as well. His work there included an illustrated essay that showed similarities between the work of Isaac Mizrahi and earlier Geoffrey Beene designs, which Mizrahi called "unbelievably unfair and arbitrary". In an essay in Details in 1989, Cunningham was the first to apply the word "deconstructionism" to fashion. He also contributed two collection-review pieces to the 1991 inaugural year of Visionaire magazine. Designer Oscar de la Renta said: "More than anyone else in the city, he has the whole visual history of the last 40 or 50 years of New York. It's the total scope of fashion in the life of New York." He made a career taking unexpected photographs of everyday people, socialites and fashion personalities, many of whom valued his company. According to David Rockefeller, Brooke Astor asked that Cunningham attend her 100th birthday party, the only member of the media invited.

For eight years beginning in 1968, Cunningham built a collection of vintage fashions and photographed Editta Sherman in vintage costumes using significant Manhattan buildings of the same period as the backdrop. Years later he explained, "We would collect all these wonderful dresses in thrift shops and at street fairs. There is a picture of two 1860 taffeta dresses, pre–Civil War–we paid $20 apiece. No one wanted this stuff. A Courrèges I think was $2. The kids were into mixing up hippie stuff, and I was just crazed for all the high fashion." The project grew to 1,800 locations and 500 outfits. In 1978, he published Facades, a collection of 128 of these photographs.

== Exhibitions ==
A selection of photos from Cunningham's Facades Project series was shown in 1977 exhibition at the Fashion Institute of Technology. The Facades series received a full exhibition at the New-York Historical Society in 2014. The Society also holds 91 silver gelatin silver prints from the Facades series, donated by Cunningham, in their permanent collection. In 2016, the Savannah College of Art and Design FASH Museum of Fashion + Film presented "Grand Divertissement à Versailles, Vintage Photographs by Bill Cunningham," an exhibition of Cunningham's images of the 1973 Battle of Versailles fashion show. In 2017 the New-York Historical Society held an exhibition of his personal possessions including his bicycle with which he rode around New York City.

== Awards and honors ==
In 1983 the Council of Fashion Designers of America named Cunningham the outstanding photographer of the year. In 2008 he was awarded the Officier de l'ordre des Arts et des Lettres by the French Ministry of Culture. As he accepted the award at a Paris ceremony, he photographed the audience and then told them: "It's as true today as it ever was: he who seeks beauty will find it." In 2009, he was named a "living landmark" by the New York Landmarks Conservancy. In 2012 he received the Carnegie Hall Medal of Excellence. The invitations to the award ceremony at the Waldorf Astoria read "Come Dressed for Bill".

== Personal philosophy ==
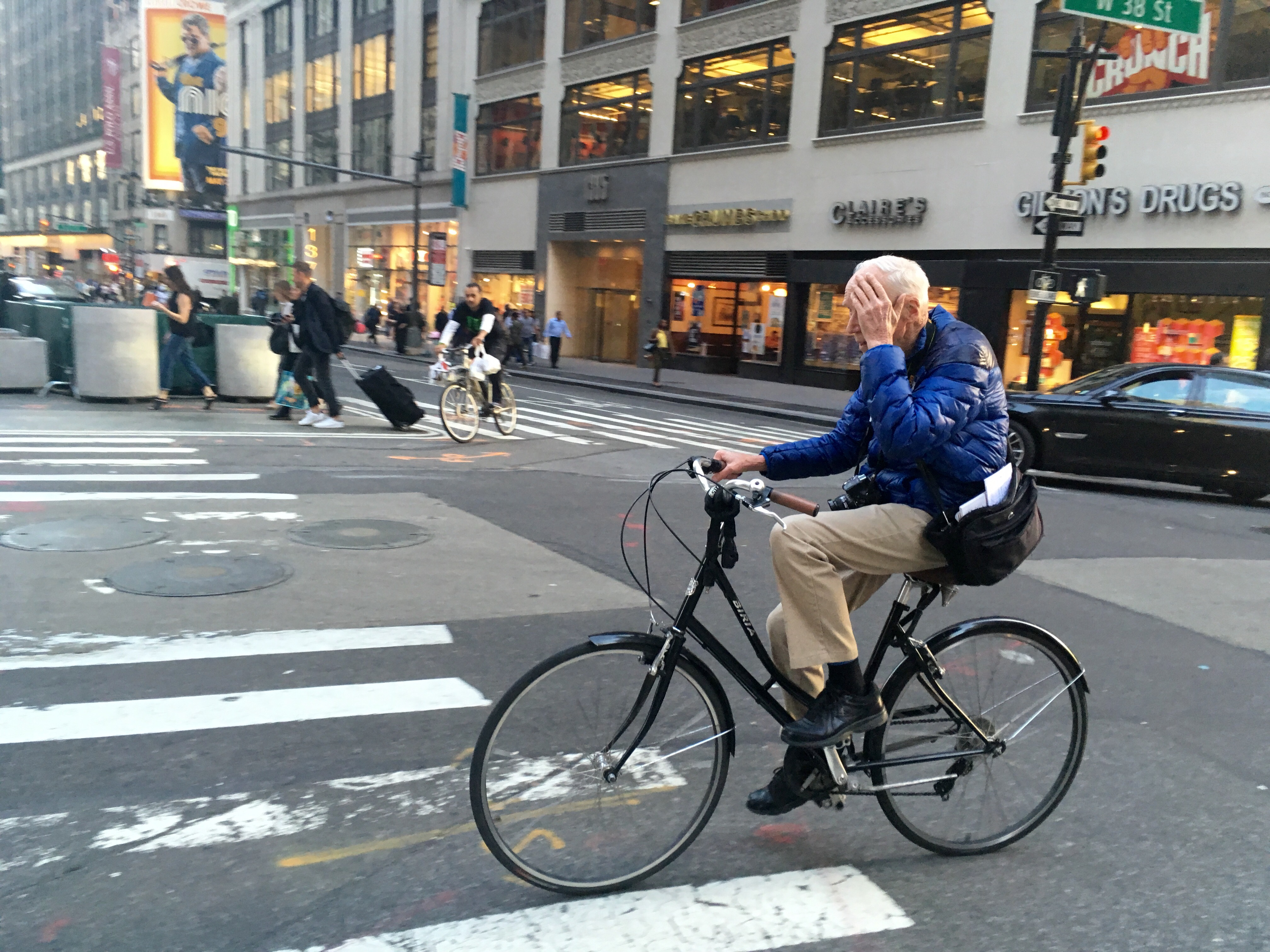
Cunningham avoiding a photographer while cruising the streets in May 2016.

His personal philosophy was: "You see, if you don't take money, they can't tell you what to do, kid." He sometimes said it another way: "Money is the cheapest thing. Liberty is the most expensive." He declined all gifts from those he photographed, even offers of food and drink at gala parties. He said: "I just try to play a straight game, and in New York that's very... almost impossible. To be honest and straight in New York, that's like Don Quixote fighting windmills." Though he contributed to the New York Times regularly beginning in the 1970s, he did not become an employee until 1994, when he decided he needed to have health insurance coverage after being hit by a truck while biking. Most of his pictures were never sold or published. He said: "I'm really doing this for myself. I'm stealing people's shadows, so I don't feel as guilty when I don't sell them."

He cultivated his own fashion signature, dressing in a uniform of black sneakers and a blue moleskin workman's jacket, his only accessory a camera. He traveled Manhattan by bicycle, repeatedly replacing those that were stolen or damaged in accidents. He praised the city's bike-sharing program when it launched in 2013: "There are bikes everywhere and it's perfect for the New Yorkers who have always been totally impatient. What I love, is to see them all on wheels, on their way to work in the morning in their business suits, the women in their office clothes ... It has a very humorous and a very practical effect for New Yorkers ... I mean, it's wonderful." After breaking a kneecap in a biking accident in 2015, he wore a cast and used a cane to photograph a Mostly Mozart Festival gala.

Cunningham described his philosophy regarding fashion in the documentary film Bill Cunningham New York: "The wider world that perceives fashion as sometimes a frivolity that should be done away with in the face of social upheavals and problems that are enormous -- the point is in fact that fashion, ah, you know, in point of fact it's the armor to survive the reality of everyday life. I don't think you could do away with it. It would be like doing away with civilization." In the same movie, during his acceptance speech for the French Legion of Honour in Paris, he said: "He who seeks beauty will find it."

== In media ==
In 2010, filmmaker Richard Press and writer Philip Gefter of The New York Times produced Bill Cunningham New York, a documentary about Cunningham. The film was released on March 16, 2011. It shows Cunningham traveling through Manhattan by bicycle and living in a tiny apartment in the Carnegie Hall building. The apartment has no closet, kitchen, or private bathroom, and is filled with filing cabinets and boxes of his photographs. The documentary also details his philosophy on fashion, art, and photography, and observes his interactions with his subjects while taking photos. Hilton Als in The New Yorker called the film "a magisterial documentary about urban life and creativity." The film received nominations for Best Documentary from The Directors' Guild of America; the Producers Guild of America; and the Independent Spirit Awards. In 2013, it was acquired by the Film Department of the Museum of Modern Art for its permanent collection

Cunningham was featured on BBC Two's The Culture Show in March 2012.

In 2018, director Mark Bozek showed his documentary The Times of Bill Cunningham in the Spotlight on Documentary slot of the New York Film Festival. The inception of the film was an interview which Bozek filmed with Cunningham in 1994. Initially intended to be 10 minutes, the interview stretched on "until the tape ran out". In the film Cunningham describes his work as a milliner in the 1940s and his first encounters with the Paris fashion world in the 1950s while stationed in France as a US serviceman. Variety critic Owen Gleiberman wrote that the film demonstrated "a special, intoxicating quality to movies that excavate the fashion demimonde prior to the 1960s." The Times of Bill Cunningham has received favorable reviews on the critical website Metacritic.

== Death and legacy ==
Cunningham died age 87 in New York City on June 25, 2016, after being hospitalized for a stroke. His death was widely reported in both the fashion and the general press. Following his death, the Bergdorf Goodman department store created a display in its building's window memorializing Cunningham. Thousands signed an online petition requesting that the corner of 5th Avenue and 57th Street in New York City be renamed "Bill Cunningham Corner". Cunningham was a lifelong Catholic and regular worshipper at Manhattan's Church of St Thomas More, where a private Requiem Mass was celebrated by parish priest Father Kevin Madigan. Madigan recalled that "[t]hose closest to him would attest that he was a spiritual person. From Sunday to Sunday Bill could be found in one of the rear pews, as unobtrusive here as he would be at some gala at the Met or the Pierre or at a fashion runway."

Though known for his strong preference for personal privacy (he participated reluctantly as a documentary film subject), Cunningham left an autobiography manuscript, which he titled Fashion Climbing, which his family discovered in his archives after his death in 2016. Penguin Press acquired the book at auction, which was published posthumously in September 2018. Critic Hilton Als contributed the preface. The New York Times Book Review praised the book: "This obscenely enjoyable romp fills in part of the Cunningham back story and provides tantalizing peeks in the psyche of the guarded and mysterious Bill... [Fashion Climbing] leaves the readers gasping for more."

In July 2025 it was announced that the New-York Historical Society had acquired his archive of photographs, negatives, and memorabilia.

== See also ==
- List of street photographers
- Scott Schuman
