= Candy Darling =

American actress (1944–1974)

- Darling by Andy Warhol in 1971
- Born: November 24, 1944; Queens, New York City, U.S.
- Died: March 21, 1974 (aged 29); Manhattan, New York City, U.S.
- Resting place: Cherry Valley Cemetery, Cherry Valley, New York, U.S.
- Other name: Hope Slattery
- Occupation: Actress

Candy Darling (born James Lawrence Slattery, November 24, 1944 – March 21, 1974) was an American actress. Best known as a Warhol superstar, she became a prominent figure in New York's downtown cultural scene of the 1960s and 1970s.

Darling rose to fame for her performances in Pop artist Andy Warhol's underground films Flesh (1968) and Women in Revolt (1971). She was also featured in the work of filmmakers and playwrights including Paul Morrissey, Werner Schroeter, Jackie Curtis, and Tennessee Williams. Darling performed in several Off-Off-Broadway and Off-Broadway productions, including Vain Victory: The Vicissitudes of the Damned (1971), Small Craft Warnings (1972), and The White Whore and the Bit Player (1973).

A pioneer for transgender visibility, Darling was celebrated for her glamorous Old Hollywood-inspired persona and candid wit. She was a muse to rock and roll musicians of the era, including the Rolling Stones and Lou Reed, who referenced her in his songs. Darling died of lymphoma at the age of 29 in 1974.

== Early life ==
=== Childhood and family ===
Candy Darling was born on November 24, 1944, in the Forest Hills, Queens neighborhood of New York City. She was the youngest child of Theresa "Terry" Slattery (née Phelan) and John F. Slattery. Her older half-brother, Warren, had a different biological father.

Terry entered Darling in children's beauty contests. She was reportedly named "Most Beautiful Baby Girl" in a beautiful baby contest at the Gertz department store, and Warren recalled that their mother entered her in the Mirror Charming Child Contest when she was five.

Terry worked as a receptionist and office worker for the Jockey Club at the Empire State Building, while Slattery worked as a cashier for the New York Racing Association at racetracks in the New York area. According to Terry, his gambling frequently left the family short of money, requiring her to work and sometimes borrow money from her mother to pay the mortgage. During the off-season, Slattery worked as a bartender.

In a later interview with Darling's friend Jeremiah Newton, Terry recalled that her husband was frequently abusive toward her and that his drinking and gambling contributed to tensions in the household. She described occasions when she fled with the children to her mother's nearby home and called the police after her husband threatened them. Terry temporarily pursued divorce proceedings following an assault but reconciled with him before the case reached court.

The family moved to North Merrick on Long Island in the mid-1940s. They lived on Crocus Avenue until 1957, when Terry and Slattery divorced. Terry used her share from the sale of their house to purchase a home in Massapequa Park, while Slattery moved to neighboring Massapequa.

=== Adolescence and early identity ===
Darling developed an early fascination with Hollywood actresses and glamour. As a child, she would fill the bathtub with blue food coloring to imitate Technicolor, surround herself with her mother's plants, and use a yellow towel as a wig to portray Lana Turner in The Prodigal (1955). She also wore her mother's high heels and makeup and walked across an ocelot coat while imagining herself as Turner in the film. A few years later, she became fascinated by Kim Novak after seeing The Eddy Duchin Story (1956). Darling said she was particularly drawn to women with white hair, which she considered "the prettiest."

Darling attended Park Side Junior High School and later Massapequa Park High School, dropping out at age 16 in 1961. That year, she enrolled in a cosmetology course at the DeVern School of Cosmetology in Baldwin, Long Island. When she graduated from DeVern's in October 1961, she was already working at a beauty parlor.

In 1962, Terry Slattery remarried Darling's father, but the marriage lasted only two months. Terry was experiencing financial difficulties and had hoped his return would provide additional support after Darling had dropped out of high school. By this time, Darling had begun developing a feminine presentation and was leading "double life." Her hair was growing toward her collar, and she sometimes wore makeup when her mother was away. Darling also began dating men. In a diary entry dated March 12, 1962, she wrote about going out with a boy named Barry and expressed concern that her mother suspected she was seeing him.

Darling began frequenting the Hayloft, a gay bar in Baldwin, with friends Sharon and Lorraine Newman. By this period, she had begun using the name Candy. Darling's mother Terry found lipstick and a compact when washing her jeans, but it's unclear when she first learned that Darling was presenting as a woman. Terry later recalled that neighbor told her that Darling had been seen at the Hayloft wearing what appeared to be her clothing. When Darling returned home, Terry confronted her. Darling left the room and returned wearing a dress. Terry gradually came to accept Darling's feminine presentation.

=== Early Manhattan years and medical transition ===
During this period, Darling began making trips to Manhattan. Actor and playwright Charles Ludlam recalled meeting her in Washington Square Park in either 1962 or 1963, when the park was a gathering place for the city's gay community. He remembered her as "beautifully dressed, but looked like a girl wearing men's clothes."

By early 1963, Darling had also met Seymour Levy, who lived on Bleecker Street near Sullivan Street in Greenwich Village. Levy's apartment became a base for Darling during her early years in Manhattan, where she increasingly became involved in the city's downtown gay and artistic circles. Darling began occasionally visiting Club 82, a nightclub in Manhattan that featured performers billed as "femme impersonators."

By 1964, Darling had aspirations to become a model. She reconnected with a former schoolmate Beau Maas, who owned an antique store on Bleecker Street, and posed for pictures in the shop. That year, Darling also began exploring medical transition. In a June 1964 diary entry, she wrote that she was "seriously considering the sex change," and in August recorded her desire to begin electrolysis and hormone treatment. In September, she received the telephone number of endocrinologist and sexologist Harry Benjamin, but did not meet with him until the following year. In April 1965, Terry wrote to Benjamin granting permission for tests and treatment for Darling.

=== Friendships and downtown scene ===
Darling met Holly Woodlawn in Greenwich Village and the two became close friends, spending weekends at Darling's home in Massapequa Park. Woodlawn recalled that Darling was then known as Candy Cane, having previously used names Hope Dahl and Candy Dahl. According to Woodlawn, Taffy Titz began calling her "Candy, darling" after they met through English Pat, and the name eventually became Candy Darling. The earliest known use of the name appears in a letter postmarked May 6, 1965.

That month, Darling was ordered by the Selective Service System to report for a physical examination. She reported on June 9 and later told her friend George Abagnalo that she began crying during the examination and was allowed to leave. She received a 4-F classification the following month, exempting her from military service.

In 1966, Darling worked several short-lived jobs while living under the name Hope C. Slattery. A W-2 records earnings of $382.12 from the Hotel Ila in Long Beach, although the nature of the position is unknown. A W-2 from the investment firm Cutter & Dixon documents $740 in earnings, where she worked as a file clerk and receptionist.

In March 1966, Darling brought Woodlawn to Seymour Levy's apartment to watch Color Me Barbra, where they met actor Jackie Curtis. That summer, Darling met Jeremiah Newton, then a high school student from Queens who had recently begun exploring Greenwich Village's gay scene. Newton recalled asking Darling whether she was comfortable wearing women's clothing, since she did not dress that way full-time. She replied, "I don't discuss my flaw with anyone," using "flaw" to refer to her penis. Newton sometimes encountered her at the Tenth of Always, an after-hours club on Third Street where transgender people were permitted to socialize.

Darling lived with actress Hope Stansbury for a time near the Caffe Cino. Playwright Robert Heide recalled that the two women influenced one another. Although later accounts attributed Darling's use of the name Hope to Stansbury, Darling had used it intermittently since her teenage years. Darling also became friends with Off-Off Broadway actress Helen Hanft, whom she met at the Caffe Cino, and began visiting Hanft at her apartment on East 16th Street.

== Career ==
=== Early theater work ===
Jackie Curtis wrote a role for Darling in Glamour, Glory, and Gold: The Life and Legend of Nola Noonan, Goddess and Star, a satirical play about the pursuit of Hollywood stardom. Curtis based Darling's character, Gregg Wilson, partly on the aspiring actress Gregg Adams, played by Suzy Parker in The Best of Everything. Ron Link agreed to direct the production, which was staged at the Playwright's Workshop at Bastiano's Cellar Studio in the East Village.

During the summer of 1967, Darling worked as a barmaid at Slugger Ann's, a bar owned by Curtis' grandmother. At the time, she was living at Hotel Seventeen near Stuyvesant Park. In August, Darling met Pop artist Andy Warhol in the West Village while accompanying Curtis, who introduced her as "Hope Slattery." Warhol later recalled being struck by her appearance. Curtis invited Warhol to the opening of Glamour, Glory, and Gold, which premiered on September 13, 1967 and marked Darling's first theatrical performances.

The play received a positive review in The New York Times, where critic Dan Sullivan wrote: "A skinny actress billed as Candy Darling also makes an impression. Hers was the first female impersonation of a female impersonator I have ever seen." Link and Curtis had kept Darling's gender identity private during the production. Darling also agreed to maintain her privacy, wanting to be viewed and reviewed as a woman.

In January 1968, Darling appeared briefly in Charles Ludlam's When Queens Collide, his version of Conquest of the Universe, performed by the Ridiculous Theatrical Company. Ludlam had remembered Darling from her days around Washington Square Park, where he had thought she had "potential for the theatre" because of her beauty and "ambivalent sexual aura or personality." He cast her among the chorus of Fire Women, who appeared in the opening scene.

By February 1968, Darling was rehearsing with playwright Tom Eyen, who had begun working at Bastiano's Cellar Studio the previous year. Eyen revived his earlier play Give My Regards to Off-Off Broadway, directed by Link, who cast Darling in the lead role of Hosanna B. Hump—her first leading role. The production was held over for 5 weeks. A Wall Street Journal review praised Darling's performance as having "superb Andy Warhol élan." Warhol attended the play and was later seen with Darling and Viva. Eyen recalled Darling telling him afterward, "Andy's going to make me a star." On the final weekend of the run, Darling signed a contract making Link her manager.

The day after Give My Regards to Off-Off Broadway closed, Darling signed a contract with producer Arthur Steuer to appear as a "nude dancer" in Psychedelic Burlesque. The show opened April 1, 1968, at the Mayfair Theatre, and Darling performed a Statue of Liberty-themed striptease. The Village Voice described Darling as "a lean one with the expressive range of a Warhol superstar."

=== Emergence as a Warhol superstar ===
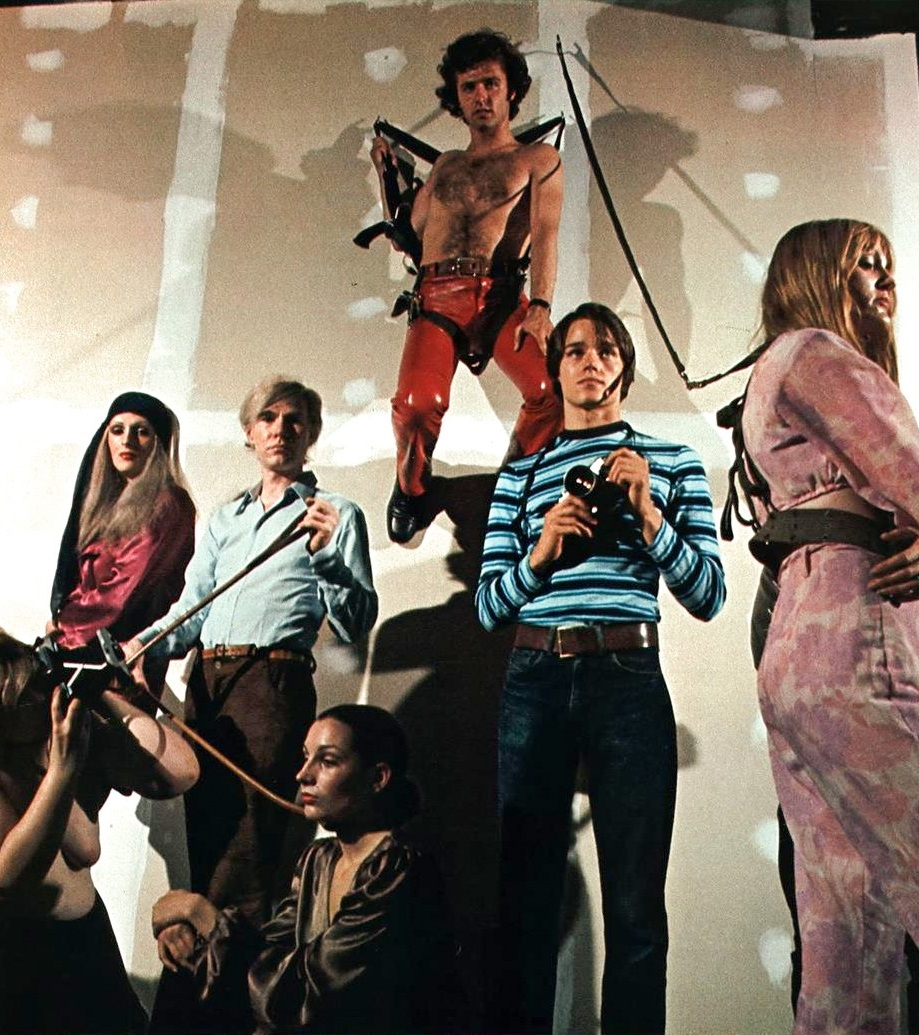
Darling (against the wall) with Andy Warhol and members of the Factory: Brigid Berlin and Geraldine Smith on the leashes held by Warhol, Gerard Malanga hanging on the wall, Jed Johnson with a camera, and Ingrid Superstar chained to the wall. Photo by Claude Picasso for Esquire, 1969

In July 1968, Paul Morrissey began work on Flesh, starring Joe Dallesandro, while Warhol was recovering from his near-fatal shooting. Morrissey wanted Darling in the film after seeing her in Give My Regards to Off-Off Broadway and finding her funny. Unable to reach her, he contacted Curtis and asked him to bring Darling to the set, adding, "Why don't you come along too and be in it?" Flesh marked the beginning of Darling's appearances in Morrissey's Warhol-produced films, whose performers became the final cohorts of Warhol superstars.

In the fall of 1968, Warhol told Darling about a planned film featuring women sitting on a bed. Warhol filmed Brass Bed in a Manhattan apartment in October 1968. The unreleased film runs approximately 66 minutes and features Darling alongside Viva, Ultra Violet, Geri Miller, Anne Wehrer, Vera Cruz, and several other women. According to curator Callie Angell's notes, the participants improvise conversations about relationships, celebrity, and their personal lives. The film remains unfinished and has never been publicly screened.

In April 1969, Darling joined the cast of Ludlam's Turds in Hell, a farce written with Bill Vehr that had been running since December. She played Saint Frigid, appearing in one scene with several lines. The production ran for seven months. That year, Sandy Amerling had become Darling's manager, although she later said, "I wasn't really managing her. I was advising her." They never signed a contract.

During this period, Darling met actress Jane Fonda, who attended a party at the Factory. Darling discussed with Fonda a proposed film that Warhol was pitching to Columbia Pictures, based on John Hallowell's book The Truth Game. The film was to star Darling as an Off-Broadway actress who travels to Hollywood "to seek the truth," and encounters several famous actors, with cameo appearances by Leslie Caron, Clint Eastwood, Natalie Wood, Rita Hayworth, and Troy Donahue.

Darling also asked Fonda to support her consideration for the title role in Myra Breckinridge, a film based on Gore Vidal's novel about a transgender woman who has undergone a sex change operation. Darling's friend George Abagnalo said that Fonda agreed to speak to Vidal on her behalf. The producers conducted screen tests, with Jack Doroshow (Flawless Sabrina) serving as a consultant. Doroshow later recalled that Vidal supported Darling getting an audition, but he was no longer involved with the film. According to Warhol, Darling wrote repeatedly to the studio and producers, telling them she had "lived the complete life of Myra." In June, Warhol told Newsday reporter Joseph Gelmis that the film's director Michael Sarne wanted to screen test Darling. Ultimately, actress Raquel Welch was cast for the role in July. Warhol described the rejection as a major disappointment and said he saw Darling become more bitter afterward.

Darling's public profile continued rising through her association with the Factory. She was photographed with Warhol and other Factory members by Richard Avedon in 1969, and appeared in a group photograph by Claude Picasso in the December 1969 issue of Esquire. In January 1970, she appeared in Photoplay, prompting her to write to her cousin Kathy, "Your famous cousin has finally made page 5 of the January issue of our old bible." She also wrote to a friend about the photographs, while expressing frustration that Warhol was offering her roles only in low-budget films such as "Gutter Trash," for which she said she had been offered a "very paltry sum." On March 1, 1970, Vogue published a Cecil Beaton photograph of Darling with Warhol and fellow Factory member Jay Johnson.

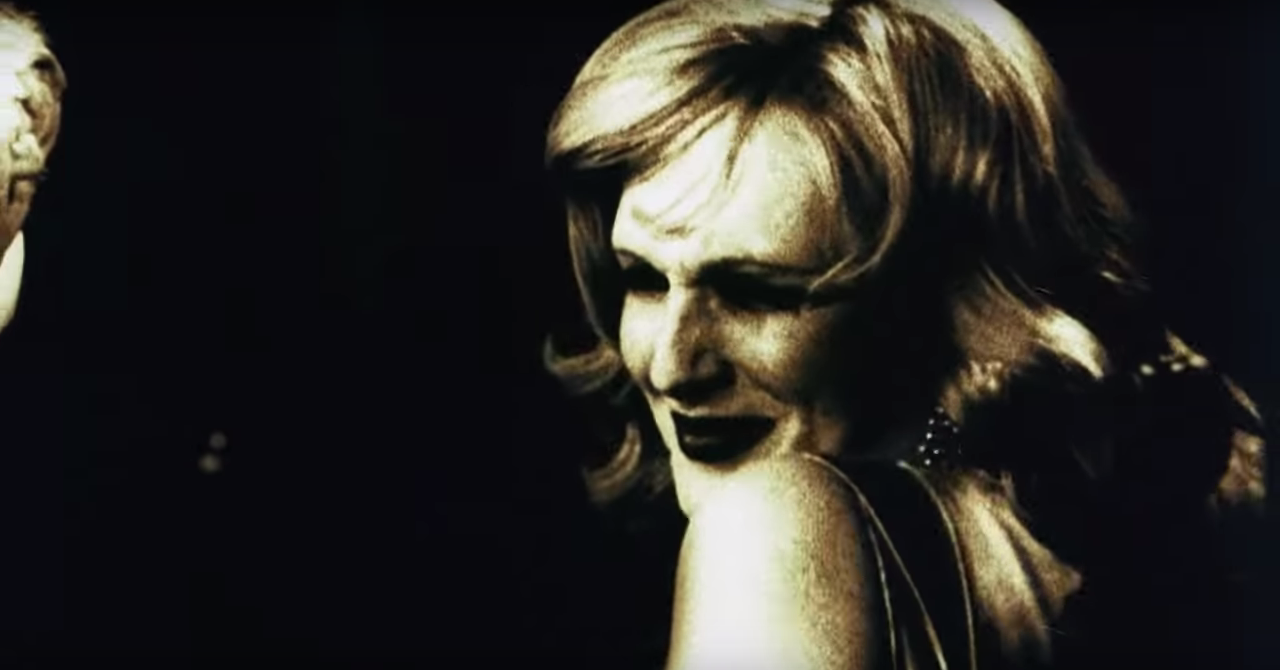
Darling, as seen in the film Silent Night, Bloody Night (1972)

Darling performed in Robert Patrick's one-act play The Reunion, which opened at the Old Reliable Theatre Tavern in Manhattan on January 19, 1970. She and Patrick played a long-estranged couple with three children. The production ran for two weeks.

In March 1970, Darling acted in the slasher film Silent Night, Bloody Night (1972). Darling continued to appear in both independent and mainstream films, including Wynn Chamberlain's Brand X (1970), Klute (1971), Some of My Best Friends Are... (1971), and Lady Liberty (1971). In late 1971, she traveled to Vienna and Munich to work with director Werner Schroeter on the feature The Death of Maria Malibran and the short film Johanna's Dream.

=== Vain Victory and Women in Revolt ===
In early 1971, Darling joined the cast of Jackie Curtis's Vain Victory: The Vicissitudes of the Damned, which premiered at La MaMa Experimental Theatre Club on May 26 after six months of rehearsals. The play, about a sinking ship, featured Darling as Donna Bella Beads, a tightrope walker with a drinking problem, and became the biggest hit of her theatrical career. After the La MaMa production closed, Curtis reworked the play as a musical. The new Vain Victory ran at the WPA Theatre from August 11 to September 5, 1971. Darling reprised Donna Bella Beads, now a mermaid in a wheelchair who falls in love with a rock star played by Curtis.

Around this time, Darling became involved with art dealer Sam Green, who introduced her to Broadway producer Richard Barr. Barr offered her a role as the transvestite love interest in a Broadway play, but she didn't like the role.

Darling starred alongside Curtis and Woodlawn in Women in Revolt (1971), a satire of the Women's Liberation Movement. She traveled to Los Angeles with Warhol when the film premiered at Filmex in November 1971 under the title Sex. It was retitled Andy Warhol's Women for its Los Angeles theatrical opening in December. Warhol had difficulty securing a distributor and rented the Cine Malibu, a theater known for sexploitation films, for its New York opening. The film premiered there as Women in Revolt on February 16, 1972. Warhol held a dinner in Darling's honor that evening at Le Parc Périgord, followed by a party at photographer Francesco Scavullo's townhouse. Scavullo told Rosemary Kent of Women's Wear Daily, "I'm giving this party because I believe Candy represents a complete new freedom for movies. She can be used now as the Greeks and English used men to play women's parts. Candy Darling is a breakthrough."

The day after the opening, a group of women demonstrated outside the Cine Malibu, protesting the film as anti-women's liberation. Darling responded by stating, "Who do these dykes think they are anyway? Well, I just hope they all read Vincent Canby's review in today's Times. He said I look like a cross between Kim Novak and Pat Nixon. It's true– I do have Pat Nixon's nose."

Green arranged for a mid-April screening of Women in Revolt at Wesleyan University, where his father was dean of fine arts. Darling made a personal appearance and kept the ticket-sale proceeds. Afterward, she led audience members, including historian William Manchester, on an impromptu parade through the streets of Middletown, Connecticut.

In June 1972, Vogue published a Richard Avedon photograph of Darling with her co-stars Jackie Curtis and Holly Woodlawn.

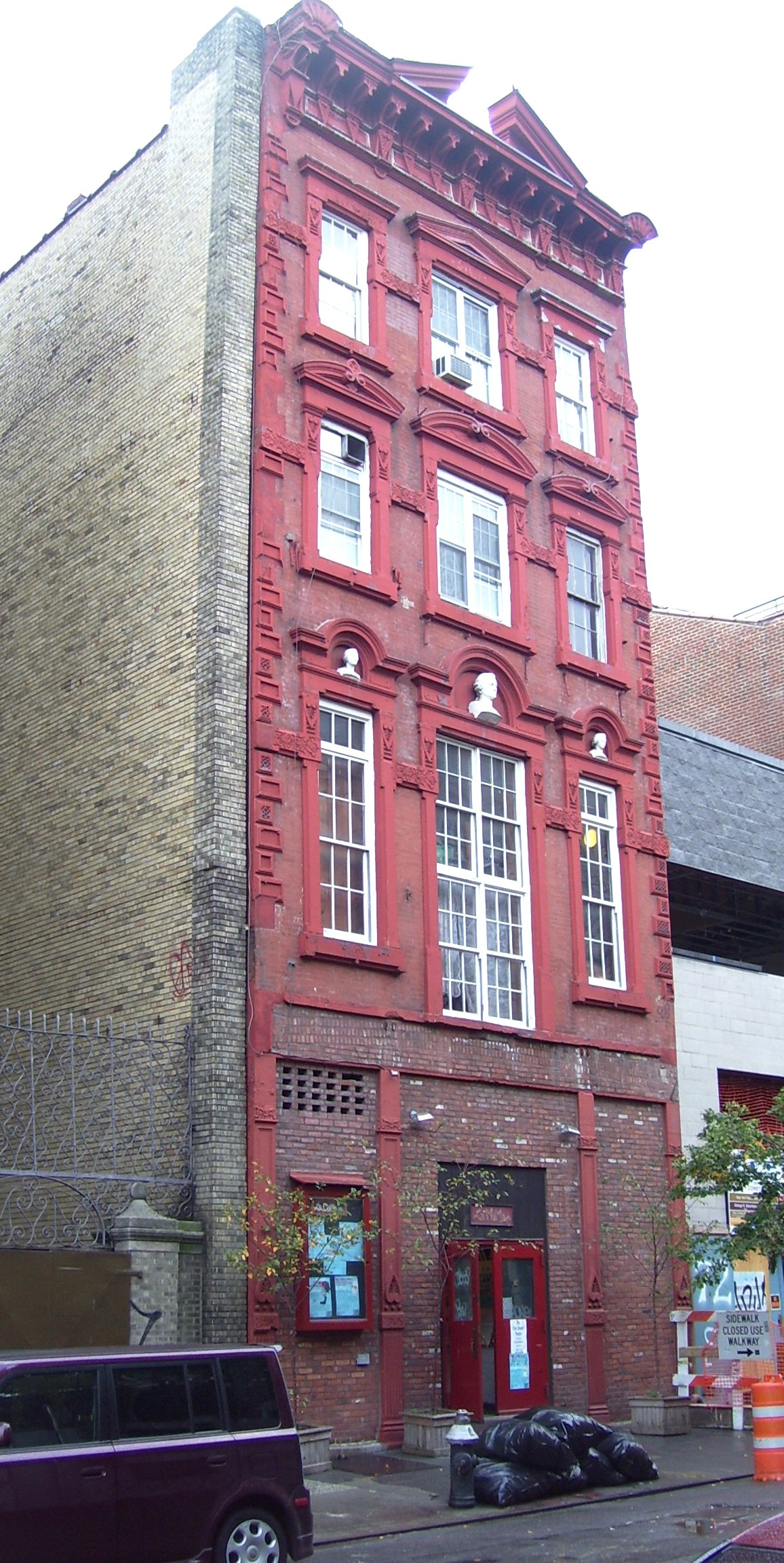
Darling performed in the plays Vain Victory: The Vicissitudes of the Damned (1971) and The White Whore and the Bit Player (1973) at La MaMa Experimental Theatre Club, located at 74A East 4th Street in Manhattan's East Village

=== Final stage roles and Interview magazine ===
In July 1972, Darling joined the cast of Tennessee Williams's Small Craft Warnings, replacing Cherry Davis as Violet. The play had opened in April at the Truck and Warehouse Theater on East 4th Street, but moved to the New Theatre on East 54th Street on June 4 amid sluggish ticket sales and mixed reviews. She had about three weeks to prepare and spent her evenings at the theater watching the actors and rehearsals from the catwalk. Darling's casting was arranged by Green, who enlisted publicists Edwin and Michael Gifford to advocate for her addition to the production.

Tom Eyen decided to produce an English-language version of The White Whore and the Bit Player, directed by Manuel Martín and starring Darling as the Whore. The play, inspired by the death of Marilyn Monroe, portrays a Hollywood star and the bit player she imagines herself to be, representing two aspects of the same woman in the moments before death. The Spanish-language production, La Estrella y La Monja, had been running successfully before moving to La MaMa, where the Spanish and English versions were performed on alternating days beginning January 17, 1973. The New York Times critic Mel Gussow praised Darling's performance, noting that she "looks like her character and resolutely keeps her acting little‐girl‐lost."

Green and Warhol discussed finding regular work for Darling. Warhol proposed making her a hostess at a supper club above a restaurant on East 74th Street partly owned by jewelry designer Kenneth Jay Lane, envisioning it as a successor to Max's Kansas City. Green suggested pairing Darling with Warhol superstar Pat Ast as host and hostess, with the two performing occasional songs. Darling supported the idea, but the proposed supper club never materialized. According to Green, Ast ultimately declined to participate, saying, "I'm too good an artist. I can't be on the same bill with a drag queen."

Darling subsequently contributed to Warhol's Interview magazine. Darling, Tinkerbelle, and Glenn O'Brien interviewed English musician Ray Davies for the January 1973 issue. She later interviewed artist Salvador Dalí for the May issue and actress Lauren Hutton for the October issue. In May, Darling also joined Warhol's interview with actor Ryan O'Neal and his daughter Tatum O'Neal at the Hotel Pierre, which was published in the July issue. Tatum had wanted to meet Darling after seeing her on the cover of After Dark. Darling arrived with her dog and spoke primarily with Tatum. At the end of the interview, she whispered to her, "Let's do a picture together, darling."

== Illness ==
=== Diagnosis ===
Darling had been experiencing undiagnosed health problems for some time. In 1972, Darling's friend George Abagnalo accompanied her to a doctor who diagnosed her with "gas" and prescribed charcoal tablets. In July 1973, her friend Jack Doroshow took her to Dr. Freymann, whom Darling had previously seen for amphetamine injections. This was the first of three visits, but she was not diagnosed during the initial examination. By this time, her symptoms had become increasingly severe with stomach pains. Darling told friends she was pregnant as her abdomen was visibly swollen and hard.

On her third visit to Dr. Freymann, Darling was diagnosed with cancer. According to Doroshow, the doctor believed that Darling's hormone use may have contributed to her illness. Darling didn't immediately disclose the diagnosis and sought a second opinion from another physician recommended by her friend Chanel. Darling's friend Stephen Stern accompanied her to the appointment, after which the doctor said that her condition was serious and she needed to be hospitalized.

=== Hospitalization and treatment ===
Actress Lauren Hutton accompanied Darling to Cabrini Health Care Center in Manhattan. Darling was initially placed in a men's ward before Hutton requested that she be transferred to a women's ward and eventually to a private room on the hospital's VIP floor, room 1423. On September 10, 1973, Darling's mother Terry Slattery recorded that her hospital admission cost $700 and that she had given Darling $300 pending her application for Medicaid.

During her hospitalization, Darling kept journal entries in a steno pad and underwent various treatments, including enemas and the administration of castor oil. Her doctors were initially uncertain about the appropriate course of treatment before deciding to perform exploratory surgery. Darling's condition improved temporarily; on September 14, she noted that her stomach had "gone down considerably."

The surgery took place during the last week of September 1973. The day before, Darling asked her friend Jeremiah Newton to find a photographer to take a portrait of her for her fans. After several photographers declined, Peter Hujar agreed to do the job. Hujar photographed Darling in her hospital bed wearing a negligee and peignoir, with a long-stemmed rose beside her. Hujar later recalled that Darling was "camping it up" and "playing every death scene from every movie." Newton said Darling was attempting to control her image despite her condition.

During exploratory surgery, the surgeon found a large tumor that had spread through Darling's body and was wrapped around her spine. The tumor could not be removed, and doctors planned to treat her with chemotherapy. The surgeon told her mother that Darling had lymphoma, but did not disclose the diagnosis to Darling at the time.

Friends visited regularly and helped provide food and supplies, while Maxime de la Falaise, Nan Kempner, Brooks Jackson, and Adriana Jackson contributed toward the medical expenses not covered by Medicaid. Maxime also arranged for a cancer specialist from Memorial Sloan Kettering Cancer Center to review Darling's X-rays, biopsy results, and medical history; the specialist concluded that the doctors at Cabrini Health Care Center were doing everything possible. On October 2, Interview editor Bob Colacello visited Darling and observed that she appeared "ghostly" and was coughing up phlegm. Colacello subsequently told Warhol that Darling had leukemia and a malignant tumor; he later recalled that Warhol cried upon hearing the news.

Writer Julie Baumgold visited Darling at Newton's invitation and wrote about it in the short story "Belle in Bed," published in her collection A Goblet of Poison: Fairy Tales of Manhattan. Baumgold remembered that Darling appeared "spectral" and "astral," consciously "playing the part of a beautiful girl dying." Newton told Baumgold that Darling's tumor had grown so large it had displaced her heart.

Darling left the hospital on October 14, 1973, returning to her mother's home in Massapequa Park. She remained ill from chemotherapy and was readmitted to the hospital five days later. During this second hospitalization, the tumor reportedly began to shrink in response to chemotherapy. She was discharged after several weeks, although she remained extremely weak.

On November 6, Darling returned to Manhattan with her father for chemotherapy. She had recently experienced a 104°F fever, nausea, and significant weight loss, weighing 112 pounds. Despite her deteriorating condition, she continued to write in her journal about returning to her career and focused on her appearance, designing and purchasing wigs in anticipation of losing her hair from chemotherapy.

=== Last public appearances ===
In November 1973, Darling's condition appeared to improve as she continued chemotherapy. On November 7, she attended Holly Woodlawn's cabaret performance at Reno Sweeney although doctors had advised her not to go. Woodlawn recalled Darling appearing "glowing in full regalia" and later learned that she had cancer.

Darling divided her time between her mother's home in Massapequa Park and Manhattan, where she sometimes stayed with Maxime de la Falaise. She continued traveling to Manhattan for chemotherapy, accompanied by Jacquie Collins, and remained socially active. Darling celebrated her 29th birthday on November 24 at a party hosted by Jane Friedman in Greenwich Village. Darling appeared happy throughout the evening and told friends that she intended to live because she knew her death would hurt them.

In early December, Darling partied at Le Jardin, a fashionable discotheque in Manhattan. Bob Colacello recalled seeing her dancing while being supported by Maxime and John McKendry. Newton went to Le Jardin only once, as Darling did not invite him because he repeatedly urged her to conserve her energy. He later encountered Sam Green, who had spoken with Darling's doctor and told him, "She doesn't have much longer. Let her dance."

By mid-December, Darling had returned to her mother's home in Massapequa Park as she was too ill to stay with friends. She felt somewhat better around Christmas and traveled with her mother to Connecticut to visit her grandmother and relatives.

On New Year's Eve, Darling returned to Manhattan and spent the night celebrating with friends, attending several parties before staying at Geraldine Smith's apartment. She continued to appear publicly in early January 1974, including an appearance at Holly Woodlawn's cabaret performance at Trude Heller's, where Woodlawn introduced her as "the girl who made the comeback of the year."

Darling's final journal entry, dated January 21, 1974, focused on her romantic disappointments and her desire for a husband. On January 30, she wrote to Colacello that she had become increasingly ill, suffering severe headaches and Bell's palsy, which had left the right side of her face and hand partially paralyzed. Colacello subsequently contacted her about her unpaid telephone bill, and Warhol agreed to pay it. Darling eventually lost the ability to write with her right hand and developed shaking, which she attributed to chemotherapy.

=== Final hospitalization ===
On February 15, 1974, Darling was readmitted to Cabrini Health Care Center for adjustments to her treatment. During her third hospitalization, she spent time in intensive care and developed pneumonia. Her friends Jacquie Collins, Tinkerbelle, Geraldine Smith, and Jeremiah Newton visited regularly. On February 19, Newton noted that Darling was extremely thin and weakened by Bell's palsy; she couldn't put her makeup on. Two women from the Lost Coin, Fay Mianulli and Ann Wilkerson, performed a ritual at her bedside that Newton described as an attempt to "fight with the devil to free Candy."

Darling continued to express hopes of recovering and marrying. She told Newton that if she left the hospital, she intended to leave New York and start a new life. On March 5, Bob Colacello visited with Adriana Jackson and observed that one of her eyes was cloudy and one arm paralyzed. Darling's mother was feeding her bouillon through a syringe. Friends arranged massages and attempted to hire a private nurse, although the $40 nightly cost was difficult to afford.

As her condition worsened, Darling began hallucinating. According to her mother, actresses Liza Minnelli and Lorna Luft visited on March 16, which made Darling "ecstatically happy." The following day, Collins brought British healer Tom Johanson, who was in town for a lecture, to the hospital. Johanson closed his eyes and placed his hands on Darling. Outside the room, he said, "I can't help her. Her spirit is already leaving her body."

== Death ==
Darling died of lymphoma on March 21, 1974, aged 29, at the Columbus Hospital division of Cabrini Health Care Center.

=== Funeral ===
Darling's funeral was held at Frank E. Campbell Funeral Chapel in New York City on March 25, 1974. Darling's friend Jeremiah Newton arrived several hours early to sit alone in the room with her casket, where he encountered Peter Hujar taking photographs from a distance. Newton was outraged and ordered Hujar to leave the funeral parlor. Darling's father objected to aspects of the service, including how she was presented in the coffin and the name used on the funeral card. Her birth name was never spoken by the minister or any of the eulogizers.

Reports circulated that drag queens were discouraged from attending the service. Despite this, several friends were present, including Holly Woodlawn, Sylvia Miles, Peter Allen, Geneviève Waïte, John Phillips, and Baby Jane Holzer. Andy Warhol did not attend, but Bob Colacello sent a floral tribute on his behalf and gave Darling's mother a check for $500 from Andy Warhol Films. Salvador Dalí gave Darling's mother an unsigned drawing of an ant on a small piece of paper. R. Couri Hay and Julie Newmar read the eulogies, Faith Dane played a piano piece, and Gloria Swanson saluted Darling's coffin.

=== Ashes and burial ===
A month after Darling's death, Newton visited her mother Terry Slattery in Massapequa Park and saw the crematorium box containing Darling's ashes, which was labeled with her birth name. Slattery initially refused to let Newton hold the box, telling him, "You cannot touch Candy. That's my son," but eventually allowed him to hold it briefly. She told him he could not take any of Darling's possessions but permitted him to look through her bedroom, which had remained unchanged.

Newton found letter Darling had written on lined notebook paper: "By the time you read this I will be gone. Unfortunately before my death I had no desire left for life. Even with all my friends and my career on the upswing I felt too empty to go on in this unreal existence. I am just so bored by everything. You might say bored to death. It may sound ridiculous but is true." She also listed friends and associates to whom she wanted to say goodbye, including Newton, Jackie Curtis, Holly Woodlawn, Sam Green, Ron Link, Andy Warhol, Paul Morrissey, Lennie Barin, and Geraldine Smith. The letter ended with a wish to meet them all again and the postscript, "Tinkerbell Hi!"

In 1982, Slattery gave Newton the tin containing Darling's ashes, saying she did not know what to do with them. She discussed her husband's homophobia and said, "There's no place for Candy. She's better off with you." In 1990, Slattery asked Newton to return the ashes so she could be buried in the family plot alongside Darling's father, who had died in 1986. Newton falsely told her that he had already buried the ashes with his own mother. He later explained that he did not want Darling buried under her deadname or alongside her father whom she had a difficult relationship with. In 2007, he buried Darling's ashes with his mother's remains in the Cherry Valley Cemetery in Cherry Valley, New York.

== Personal life ==
=== Relationships ===
From 1969 to 1970, Darling occasionally stayed with her manager Sandy Amerling and her husband, Donald, at their apartment at 20 East 9th Street in Greenwich Village. Darling was having an affair with Donald, whom she described to her friend Jeremiah Newton as "uber-masculine." Amerling eventually found them in bed together and divorced Donald soon afterward, although she said the affair was not the reason.

Darling met art dealer Sam Green in 1969, when he arranged a photo session with British photographer Cecil Beaton at the Factory. In 1971, they both appeared in Jackie Curtis's play Vain Victory. Green began courting Darling on opening night after being struck by her beauty. During this period, Darling was living with Newton in Brooklyn. In 1972, Darling moved into Green's duplex apartment at 14 West 68th Street in Manhattan, occupying the first floor apartment connected to his.

Darling sometimes referred to Green as her "husband" and implied that they were a couple, although Green did not intend for her to become a permanent resident. In May 1973, Darling wrote in her journal that Green's sister planned to stay at his apartment for the summer, requiring Darling to leave. Darling stayed temporarily at Hotel Diplomat before returning to Green's apartment in July. Darling kept a dog named Ronnie and a pet tarantula named Sylvia Miles. Later that summer, Green asked Darling to move out, citing problems caused by Ronnie, whom he said was not housebroken and repeatedly made messes and damaged the apartment.

=== Gender identity ===
Darling lived and presented as a woman and disliked being called a drag queen or transvestite. She modeled her appearance on the old Hollywood actresses she admired, particularly Kim Novak, Lana Turner, and Joan Bennett.

In June 1964, Darling's mother Terry Slattery consulted a psychologist at the Southeast Nassau Guidance Center because she was "determined to be a girl." The psychologist advised her not to discourage Darling, warning that "suicide in these cases was very high." Terry subsequently accepted Darling's feminine presentation and began using the name Candy at her request. Although she remained concerned about the consequences of her child's "transformation," she consented for her to start getting hormone shots in 1965. Darling's father, however, continued to refer to her by her deadname.

Darling frequently discussed the possibility of gender-affirming surgery, but did not undergo the procedure. Her friend Tinkerbelle described her as "a woman trapped in a man's body." Darling also invested much of her earnings in maintaining her feminine appearance, including hormones, makeup, dental work, and eyelashes. Reflecting on Darling in his memoir Popism (1980), Warhol described her efforts to embody the everyday experiences associated with womanhood:

Candy didn't want to be a perfect woman—that would be too simple, and besides it would give her away. What she wanted was to be a woman with all the little problems that a woman has to deal with—runs in her stocking, runny mascara, men that left her. She would even ask to borrow Tampaxes, explaining that she had a terrible emergency. It was as if the more real she could make the little problems, the less real the big one—her cock—would be.

While she was experiencing symptoms from the growing tumor but before receiving a diagnosis, Darling told her friend Jacquie Collins, "I look six months pregnant," and, "It would be nice if I were because we could all retire. Because it would be [like] the Virgin Mary, you know. It would be a first." Darling also told her friend Jeremiah Newton that she was pregnant. When Newton questioned how this could have happened, she replied, "I think God has answered my prayers." This reflected Darling's desire to become biologically female.

== Legacy ==
Warhol referred to Darling as "my greatest" superstar. He later reflected, "Studying the shortcomings of the other drag queens made you realize how special Candy was, how hard she had to work to stay so femme and how successful she was at it."

In 1997, My Face for the World to See, a collection of edited diary entries written at different points in Darling's life and drawn from several journals, was published by Handy Marks Publications.

In 2010, the feature-length documentary Beautiful Darling: The Life and Times of Candy Darling, Andy Warhol Superstar premiered at the Berlin International Film Festival. Directed by James Rasin and produced by Jeremiah Newton and Elisabeth Bentley, the film draws on archival footage, photographs, personal papers, and audio interviews. Chloë Sevigny narrates the film, voicing Darling's private diary entries and personal letters.

In 2019, a biopic about Darling was announced, with Stephanie Kornick attached to write the screenplay and Zackary Drucker as executive producer. The film was to be produced by Christian D. Bruun, Katrina Wolfe, and Louis Spiegler. In 2022, Hari Nef was reported to have been cast as Darling.

In 2024, the biography Candy Darling: Dreamer, Icon, Superstar by Cynthia Carr was published.

== In popular culture ==
=== Literature ===
In 2009, C☆NDY, which calls itself "the first transversal style magazine", debuted. It is named after Darling.

In 2017, Kay Gabriel published a book of sonnet-based poetry, Elegy Department Spring, about Darling.

=== Film and theater ===
Candy Darling has been portrayed in a range of stage and screen works over time. She was portrayed by Stephen Dorff in I Shot Andy Warhol (1996). In 2006, she was depicted by actor Vince Gatton in the Off-Broadway production of Candy and Dorothy, a play by David Johnston, for which Gatton received a Drama Desk award nomination. This was followed by Pop!, a musical by Mark Brokaw at Yale Repertory Theatre in 2009, in which Darling was portrayed by Brian Charles Rooney.

In 2011, Darling was portrayed by Willam Belli in the 2011 HBO film Cinema Verite.

=== Music ===
Darling and her friend Taffy are mentioned in the chorus of the 1967 Rolling Stones song "Citadel."

Darling is the subject of the song "Candy Says", the opening track on the Velvet Underground's self-titled album in 1969, written by Lou Reed and sung by Doug Yule.

The second verse of Lou Reed's 1972 song "Walk on the Wild Side" is devoted to Darling.

A still of Darling in the film Women in Revolt is featured on the cover of the Smiths' single "Sheila Take a Bow".

American musician St. Vincent named a song after Darling in her album Daddy's Home.

Peter Hujar's photo, "Candy Darling on her Deathbed", was used by Antony and the Johnsons for the cover of their 2005 Mercury Music Prize-winning album I Am a Bird Now.

=== Miscellany ===
Greer Lankton made a bust of Darling that was displayed at the 1995 Whitney Biennial.

Byredo created a candle scent named after Darling.

== Filmography ==
=== Filmography ===
Year	Title	Role	Notes
1968	Flesh	Candy	
1970	The Landlord	Extra	
1970	Brand X	Marlene D-Train	
1970	The Magic Garden of Stanley Sweetheart		
1971	Lady Liberty	Transvestite	Italian title: La Mortadella
1971	Klute	Discothèque Patron	Uncredited
1971	Some of My Best Friends Are...	Karen / Harry	
1971	Women in Revolt	Candy	
1972	The Death of Maria Malibran		Directed by Werner Schroeter
1972	Silent Night, Bloody Night	Guest	(final film role)
1973	An American Family	Herself	Episode 2, footage of Vain Victory
1975	Johannas Traum		Directed by Werner Schroeter
2002	The Cockettes	Herself	Archive footage
2004	Superstar in a Housedress	Herself	Archive footage
2006	Andy Warhol: A Documentary Film	Herself	Archive footage
2010	Beautiful Darling	Herself	Archive footage
2020	Disclosure: Trans lives on Screen	Herself	Archive footage
