= Stage Blood =

- Original language: English
- Written by: Charles Ludlam
- Based on: Hamlet by William Shakespeare
- Genre: Comedy

Premiere
- Date: December 8, 1974
- Place: Evergreen Theatre, New York City
- Directed by: Charles Ludlam

Stage Blood is a 1974 comedy by American playwright and actor Charles Ludlam. First performed by his Ridiculous Theatrical Company at the Evergreen Theatre in New York, it follows a touring theatre troupe presenting William Shakespeare's Hamlet. Events in the actors' lives begin to resemble the tragedy they are performing. The play combines backstage farce, a play within a play and a murder mystery.

== Plot ==
The Stone family leads a small theatrical company touring the United States with Hamlet. Carleton Stone Sr., who once played Hamlet, now portrays the Ghost; his son, Carleton Stone Jr., reluctantly plays the title role. Stone Sr.'s wife, Helga Vain, plays Gertrude, while her lover, Edmund Dundreary, plays Claudius. When the troupe's Ophelia leaves, a young local woman, Elfie Fey, auditions to replace her, despite her father's objections.

The stage manager, Jenkins, wants the company to perform his own experimental play. Meanwhile, backstage conflicts increasingly mirror those in Hamlet. After Stone Sr. is murdered, his son suspects his mother and her lover. The action repeatedly blurs the line between Shakespeare's fictional characters and the actors portraying them.

== Background and themes ==
Stage Blood draws heavily on Hamlet, paralleling the events of Shakespeare's tragedy with conflicts unfolding backstage. In one sequence, Carleton Jr. and the new Ophelia perform Hamlet's rejection of Ophelia before repeating the confrontation in contemporary language offstage. The play also incorporates material adapted from James Joyce's Ulysses and Thomas Kyd's The Spanish Tragedy in a sequence exploring relationships between fathers and sons. Ludlam connected this material to his own relationship with his father.

The backstage murder mystery also explores conventional masculinity and same-sex desire, particularly through the Hamlet character's attraction to the stage manager Jenkins rather than to Ophelia.

== Production history ==
=== Original production and early revivals ===
Stage Blood opened at the Evergreen Theatre on December 8, 1974, in a production directed by Ludlam, who played Carleton Stone Jr. and Hamlet. The cast included Black-Eyed Susan (Elfie Fey), Lola Pashalinski (Helga Vain), Bill Vehr (Edmund Dundreary), Jack Mallory (Carleton Stone Sr. and Gilbert Fey) and John D. Brockmeyer (Jenkins). The original run closed on February 9, 1975.

The company performed the play at an international theatre festival in Florence in 1976. New York revivals opened at the Truck and Warehouse Theatre on July 1, 1977, and at the Charles Ludlam Theatre on May 24, 1978.

=== Later American productions ===
Ludlam also brought the play to Los Angeles in 1978.

In 1988, Diversionary Theatre in San Diego mounted a production directed by Thomas Vegh at the Marie Hitchcock Puppet Theatre. The production was advised by Steven Samuels, who had worked with Ludlam's Ridiculous Theatrical Company.

Michael Goldfried directed a New York revival at the Red Room in November and December 2000.

=== Greek production (2024) ===
The play received its first Greek production under the title Aima sti skini (Αίμα στη σκηνή) at the Contemporary Theatre in Athens in May 2024. Tasos Pyrgieris directed a translation by Christina Babou-Pagkourelli. Thanos Lekkas played Carleton Stone Sr. and Gilbert Fey; the cast also included Alexandros Varthis, Rena Kyprioti and Christos Stathousis.

In Monopoli, Stella Charami singled out Lekkas's performance while finding some of the script dated and criticizing the pace of parts of the production. Tonia Karaoglou, writing for Athinorama, also praised Lekkas's double role but found the ensemble performances uneven.

=== Austin production (2026) ===
From June 26 to July 11, 2026, the Austin, Texas, company Different Stages presented Stage Blood at the Vortex, directed by Norman Blumensaadt. Will Douglas played Carleton Stone Jr., and Ev Lunning played Carleton Stone Sr. and Gilbert Fey. Sabrina Wallace of BroadwayWorld and David Glen Robinson of CTX Live Theatre reviewed the production positively, particularly its acting and broad theatrical comedy.

== Reception ==
Tomkins reported that the original production received favorable reviews but drew disappointing ticket sales. Ludlam said he had continued revising the play after its opening and regarded its father–son material as personally significant. In its description of the Charles Ludlam papers, the New York Public Library identifies Stage Blood, Bluebeard and Camille as Ludlam's three most successful plays.

== Publication ==
Stage Blood was included in The Mystery of Irma Vep and Other Plays, a collection published by Theatre Communications Group in 1999 with an introduction by Tony Kushner.
