= Ruby Lynn Reyner =

American singer and songwriter (1948–2024)

- Born: Lynn Reyner; January 27, 1948; New York City, U.S.
- Died: March 10, 2024 (aged 76) New York City, U.S.
- Genre: Glam rock
- Occupations: Singer; songwriter; playwright; actress
- Years active: 1967–2024
- Label: Poo Poo Plater
- Website: rubylynnreyner.com

Ruby Lynn Reyner (January 27, 1948 – March 10, 2024) was an American singer, songwriter, musical playwright and actress known as the star of the Playhouse of the Ridiculous and associated as the leader of the glam rock band Ruby and the Rednecks in New York City. She and her band performed on the New York Club circuit at clubs such as Max's Kansas City and CBGB's during the 1970s. Reyner also did film starring in Heaven Wants Out by director Robert Feinberg in 1970.

Reyner was included among Warhol Factory denizens, artists and superstars and modeled for photographer Francesco Scavullo for his photo book Scavullo: Francesco Scavullo Photographs 1948–1984. She also modeled for Leee Black Childers, who included her in his 130 Fabulous Faces.

Throughout the 1970s Reyner continued performing with her band on the downtown glam punk rock scene in NYC until experiencing a serious illness in 1982 which suspended her career for several years. It wasn't until the 1990s that she returned to music and performance continuing until today. Reyner last directed, performed and produced her play Singin'in the ER in Fall 2019 at Theater for the New City in New York City.

== Early life and career ==
Born Lynn Reyner in Brooklyn, New York City on January 27, 1948, to Dr. Franklin Cooper Reyner and actress Rubye Reyner (née Meyers). Ruby Lynn Reyner spent her infancy under the care of her maternal grandmother and family in Manhattan Beach, Brooklyn. Her father was a physician, an Ob/Gyn Specialist, who moved the family to Long Island, New York.

Reyner graduated from South Side Sr. High School in Rockville Centre, then entered Emerson College. She began a career in modeling and attended a rehearsal of The Playhouse of the Ridiculous and was introduced to John Vacarro who immediately put her in the chorus of Conquest of the Universe. She soon rose to the feature role as Alice, the conqueror's wife. She starred in many Playhouse productions during the 1970s and 1980s.

== Theatre ==
Ruby Lynn Reyner performed with Playhouse of the Ridiculous[11] and was added to the cast of Drag Queens and Warhol superstars.[12] She appeared in 40 Vacarro productions such as Conquest of the Universe, Lady Godiva, Heaven Grand in Amber Orbit, Cock Strong, Son of Cock Strong, and Pineapple Face.[11]

She remained with the Playhouse for many years starring in Heaven Grand in Amber Orbit by Jackie Curtis, Sissy by Seth Allan, and La Bohemia written and directed by John Vacarro. She won the Drama Desk Award for outstanding performance in La Bohemia and received good notices for her Broadway role of Mary, Queen of Scots in Paul Foster's Elizabeth I.

Reyner and her co-writer Gordon Bressac created and produced several musical variety shows at Crystal Fields Theater for the New City, including Voidville 1 and Vandals of 1981. In addition, she made appearances in other shows like Jimmy Camecia's Hot Peaches. During the 1990s, she wrote, directed and starred in Singing' in the Islands and Christmas in the Islands.

Reyner continued to write, direct and perform in the show Singin' in the ER, a satirical play about her own hospital experiences, produced at the Theater for the New City during Fall 2019.

== Music ==
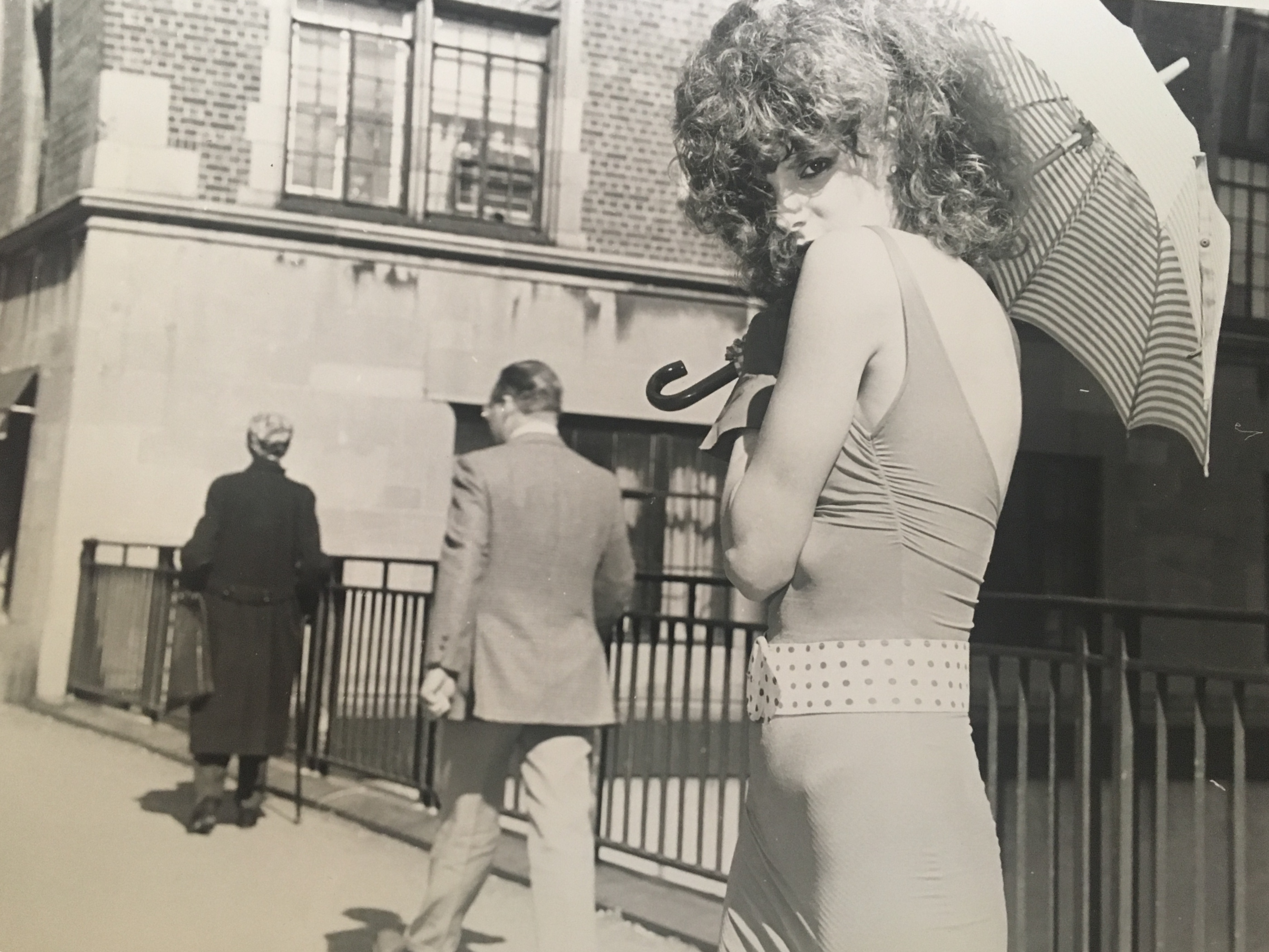
Ruby Lynn Reyner photo shoot in NYC

Reyner sang in many Playhouse productions and formed a band with her collaborating musical artists Ruby and the Rednecks. She wrote satirical songs, many from the Playhouse, with her partner and collaborator John Madera and debuted at the Mercer Arts Center where she opened for The New York Dolls and thus became part of the glam rock movement and punk rock scene at Max's Kansas City and CBGB's.

Ruby has performed with the Rednecks since the 1970s. About her performance when singing her song "Beat Me Daddy", Village Voice wrote "Ruby threw out an oversized Teddy Bear, shrieked, stomped on the bear, kicked it, clawed at the audience while her claque (from Interview magazine I was told) roared back their delight. Meanwhile Michael Goldstein of the SoHo Weekly News was telling Tina Weymouth, Trixie A. Balm and myself that Ruby was going to make it big because she has what it takes."

She produced two albums for Ruby and the Rednecks: From the Wrong Side of Town produced with Peter Crowley and Live Again! at CBGB's a live album, narrated by Jayne County.

== Film ==
Reyner starred in Heaven Wants Out in 1970. It features Holly Woodlawn, Mary Woronov, Ondine and the photographer Francesco Scavullo.

Heaven Wants Out remained on the shelf incomplete until the 2000s when the film's history was told by the documentary Finishing Heaven, appearing on HBO in 2008.

Reyner also had the lead role in 1971's About Me: A Musical by Robert Frank. Other appearances include Beautiful Darling and Generation Um.

== Death ==
Reyner died in New York City on March 10, 2024, at the age of 76.

== Filmography ==
Year	Title	Role	Director
1967	Four Stars (aka ****)	Ruby	Andy Warhol
1971	About Me: A Musical	Robert Frank	Robert Frank
1972	Crush Proof	The American Friend	François De Menil
2002	The Cockettes	Herself	Bill Weber, David Weissman
2008	Finishing Heaven	Herself	Mark Mann
2009	Heaven Wants Out	Herself	Robert Feinberg
2010	Beautiful Darling	Herself	James Rasin
2012	Generation Um	Posse Queen	Mark Mann

== Broadway ==
Year	Title	Role	Theater
1972	Elizabeth I	Mary, Queen of Scotts	Lyceum Theatre
1971	Delicate Champions	Princess Freafreara	Lincoln Center

== Off Broadway and Off Off Broadway ==
Title	Role	Theater
Conquest of the Universe	Alice, the Queen of the Universe	Bouwerie Lane Theatre
Lady Godiva	Lady Godiva	Playhouse of the Ridiculous, La Mama
Life of Juanita Castro	Fidel Castro	Theatre for the New City
Cock Strong	Denise	La Mama
Son of Cock Strong	Denise	La Mama
Heaven Grand and Amber Orbit	Heaven Grand	La Mama
Sissy by Seth Allan	Lead	La Mama
Pineapple Face	Noriega Mistress	Theatre for the New City
La Fin Du Cirque	Axe Lady	La Mama
Voideville 1	Emcee	Theatre for the New City
Off the Cuff	Lead	Theatre for the New City
Last Brunch	Old Mary	Theatre for the New City
Christmas Cards	Young Mary	Theatre for the New City
Champagne by Jackie Curtis	Sophie	Theatre World
La Bohemia	Trilby	La Mama
YMCA	Lena, the laughing hyena	Stigwood Productions
Vandals of 1981	Host, Kitty, Stella	Diplomat Hotel
Book of Etiquette	Cecilla	La Mama
Gulliver's Travels	Queen Glonda Loona	La Mama Annex
Midsummer Nights Dream	Puck	La Mama Annex
Not Up To Snuff	Natasha	Performance Space New York
Andy Milligan Cinderella'85	Cinderella	Park Avenue Christian Church
Lily, A Tragedy for cabaret or Lounge	Lily	La Mama Cabaret
Red Tide Blooming	Tanorexic Gypsey	Performance Space New York
Singin' in the Island	Amanda, director, playwright	La Mama Galleria
Christmas in the Island	Amanda, director, playwright	La Mama
Voideville 2	Emcee, co-director	Theatre for the New City
Two by Tavel	Fidel Castro	Theatre for the New City
Singin' in the ER	Amanda, director, playwright	Theatre for the New City

== Awards ==
Year	Association	Category	Nominated work	Result
1972	Drama Desk Award	Outstanding Performance in a Musical	La Bohemia	Won
2018	Acker Award	Music	Musical Career	Won

== Ruby and the Rednecks discography ==
=== Albums ===
- From the Wrong Side of Town (2004)
- Live Again! At CBGB's (2008)

=== Compilation albums ===
- Max's Kansas City 1976 & Beyond (2017)
