= Alexis Del Lago =

- Born: Domingo Blasini Calabaza; November 15, 1938 (age 87); Mayagüez, Puerto Rico
- Other name: Alexis Blasini
- Occupations: Actress, cabaret singer, costume designer

Alexis del Lago (born November 15, 1938), also known as Alexis Blasini, is a Puerto Rican-born actress, cabaret singer, and costume designer. Known for her glamorous stage persona inspired by actress Marlene Dietrich, Del Lago was involved with the Theatre of the Ridiculous movement and became a cabaret performer in downtown New York nightlife. She later moved to Hollywood, where she continued to perform and operated an antique boutique.

== Early life and education ==
Del Lago was born in Mayagüez, Puerto Rico, and moved to New York City in 1956. She enrolled at Parsons School of Design as a fashion design student. While attending Parsons, she dressed in drag for the first time at a campus ball and won the event's competition. According to Del Lago, school administrators objected to her gender expression, and she was subsequently told she could not continue at the institution. Her mother helped her find an artistic environment where she felt accepted and encouraged her by saying, "Darling, everything you do is art!" Following her departure from Parsons, she studied draping and fashion illustration at Traphagen School of Fashion.

== Career ==
Del Lago honed her skills working under fashion designer Pauline Trigère. Del Lago later stated that she was pressured to suppress her feminine presentation while working in the fashion industry.

She appeared briefly in Flaming Creatures (1963), the controversial experimental film directed by Jack Smith.

In 1967, Del Lago became involved with the Ridiculous Theatrical Company. She starred in Charles Ludlam's production Big Hotel and When Queens Collide at the Gate Theater in the East Village.

She also starred as Charmin Gale in the Off-off Broadway production Amerika Cleopatra by playwright Jackie Curtis at the WPA Theatre. Although active in the same downtown social scene as Pop artist and filmmaker Andy Warhol—largely through her association with Curtis, one of Warhol's "superstars"—del Lago never appeared in any of Warhol’s films. In later interviews, she described his underground films as "tacky" and "boring," stating that she preferred the glamour associated with classic Hollywood movie stars such as Marlene Dietrich and Greta Garbo.

In 1973, Del Lago presented her own production, Shanghai Loca, at the 13th Street Playhouse in Greenwich Village. "It was about the Norma Desmond character from Sunset Boulevard getting out of jail and starting a new life," she said. Around this time, Del Lago had established herself as a cabaret performer, moving away from camp-oriented drag performance and cultivating a stage persona heavily influenced by Dietrich. Writing for the Toronto Star in 1973, journalist Gale Garnett described del Lago as "a transvestite" who "makes his living singing Dietrich songs while wearing very expensive gowns and elaborate beaded and feathered head-dresses." Garnett further praised del Lago’s theatrical style, describing her as "the ultimate costume trip, crossing all borders to play dress-up," and connected her performances to the revival of drag as a popular public art form.

Del Lago served as a muse to photographer Gilles Larrain for his 1973 photobook Idols, a celebrated collection documenting New York's transvestite scene and underground personalities of the era. She later appeared on the cover of the book’s expanded 2011 edition, which featured a broader selection from Larrain’s archival photographs.

In the 1970s, Del Lago lived in an apartment on 89th Street and Riverside Drive on the Upper West Side of Manhattan.

She left New York City in 1975 but returned during the 1980s, becoming immersed in New York nightlife. Del Lago performed in low-budget productions at Club 57 in the East Village. There, she befriended performer John Sex, who defended her when "somebody said something nasty, and she subsequently designed his stage costumes. Together they starred in the show Sweet Blondes of Youth, loosely based on Tennessee Williams' 1959 play Sweet Bird of Youth, at Danceteria in 1982.

In 1986, lyricist and performer Scott Wittman became one of her collaborators after meeting her during a Disney-themed production, When You Wish Upon a Star, at the Limelight nightclub in Manhattan. That year, Del Lago performed in a series of productions with performance artist Gaylord Cull at the Limelight, including Gaylord's World of Tomorrow, a musical spectacle inspired by the 1939 World's Fair. The production featured Joey Arias, J. P. Dougherty, and other figures from New York's downtown performance scene.

In 1988, Del Lago headlined Wigstock at the Pyramid Club.

== Later years ==
In the 1990s, Del Lago relocated to Hollywood, where she moonlighted as a cabaret singer and operated the antique boutique The Gilded Lily. Working under the name Alexis Blasini as a fabric designer, she created luxurious, theatrical pillows, draperies, dresses, and hats. Her clientele included filmmaker Tim Burton, who reportedly commissioned a series of "surreal" pillows.

She has Parkinson's disease and lives in a Los Angeles nursing home.
