= Ethyl Eichelberger =

American dramatist

- Born: July 17, 1945; Pekin, Illinois, United States
- Died: August 12, 1990 (aged 45); Staten Island, New York, USA

Ethyl Eichelberger (July 17, 1945 – August 12, 1990) was an Obie Award-winning American drag performer, playwright, and actor. He became an influential figure in experimental theater and writing, and wrote nearly forty plays portraying women such as Jocasta, Medea, Nefertiti, Clytemnestra, and Lucrezia Borgia. He became more widely known as a commercial actor in the 1980s.

== Early life and education ==
Ethyl Eichelberger was born on July 17, 1945, in Pekin, Illinois to Amish Mennonite parents. He attended Knox College in Galesburg, Illinois and graduated from the American Academy of Dramatic Arts in New York City in 1967.

== Career ==
For seven years he was the lead character actor at the Trinity Repertory Company in Providence, Rhode Island. He then returned to New York, changed his name to Ethyl, and became a member of Charles Ludlam's Ridiculous Theatrical Company, acting and designing wigs. At the Ridiculous Theatrical Company, Eichelberger met actor Black-Eyed Susan, who became a close friend. In 1987 he wrote his play Saint Joan for Black-Eyed Susan, following the death of Charles Ludlam.

Eichelberger's plays were performed in almost any space that might pass as a stage in New York City during the height of the East Village performance bar scene of the 1980s. Among the venues at which they were produced are the Pyramid Club, King Tut's Wah Wah Hut, and 8 B.C., and later at more established venues such as P.S. 122, Dixon Place, La Mama, the Performing Garage, and Dance Theatre Workshop. Eichelberger also took productions of his plays on tour to such far away places as Australia and Europe.

He often performed solo works in free verse based on the lives of the grandes dames of history, including Lucrezia Borgia, Jocasta, Medea, Lola Montez, Nefertiti, Clytemnestra, and Carlotta, Empress of Mexico. "I wanted to play the great roles but who would cast me as Medea?", he mused late in life in Extreme Exposure: An Anthology of Solo Performance Texts from the Twentieth Century. His 1984 play Leer distilled Shakespears's King Lear into 3 characters, all played by Eichelberger. Such works are rarely revived, as they require a solo performer capable of accompanying himself on the accordion, eating fire, turning cartwheels, and doing splits and other acrobatic feats.

He became more widely known as a commercial actor in the 1980s, appearing with The Flying Karamazov Brothers on Broadway in Shakespeare's The Comedy of Errors, and with Sting in The Threepenny Opera. He also appeared as a cast member of the HBO variety series Encyclopedia. On television, he appeared on The Equalizer in the 1987 episode "Shadow Play" as a butler.

== Death and legacy ==
Eichelberger died by suicide on August 12, 1990. Only after his death did it become widely known that he had developed AIDS two years prior and was experiencing the debilitating effects of the disease and treatments available at that time.

In 2005, the non-profit arts organization P.S. 122 awarded the first Ethyl Eichelberger Award to Taylor Mac.
