= Old Reliable =

Old Reliable may refer to:

- The Old Reliable, a novel by P. G. Wodehouse
- Old Reliable Tape and Picture Company, a gay pornography company
- Old Reliable Theatre Tavern in New York City
- The Cleveland Gazette, a weekly newspaper
- Gordo (monkey), a monkey sent to space
- Louisville and Nashville Railroad
- 9th Infantry Division (United States)
- Quincy Mine, a copper mine in Michigan
- RMS Olympic, an ocean liner
- Redstone Test Stand, at Marshall Space Flight Center
- Tommy Henrich (1913–2009), American baseball player
