= Lola Pashalinski =

American theatre artist

Lola Pashalinski (born Regina Hirsch) is an American theatre artist known for her work as a founding member of Charles Ludlam's Ridiculous Theatrical Company.

== Early life ==
Born Regina Hirsch in Brooklyn, New York, Pashalinki's father was an insurance salesman. She spent her young adulthood "bounc[ing] around from odd job to odd job 'mostly in publishing' and briefly attended college before dropping out."

== Career ==
Pashalinski became involved in theatre as an assistant director with John Vaccaro's Playhouse of the Ridiculous, a resident company at La MaMa Experimental Theatre Club, during the 1960s. She left the Playhouse of the Ridiculous with Ludlam when he and John Vaccarro had a disagreement during rehearsals for Conquest of the Universe in 1967.

Ludlam then founded his Ridiculous Theatrical Company, and Pashalinski was a founding member, working with the company from its establishment in 1967 until 1980. During those years, she appeared in 17 of the company's productions, including as Lola Lola in Corn (1973), Brunhilde in Der Ring Gott Farblonjet (1977), and Miss Cubbidge in Bluebeard (1970). Black-Eyed Susan, Mario Montez, and John Brockmeyer also performed in that production of Bluebeard, which took place at La MaMa. Mary Brecht and Leandro Katz did design for the production. She also performed alongside Black-Eyed Susan, Brockmeyer, and Ethyl Eichelberger in Eichelberger's Phedre and Oedipus at La MaMa in 1977.

After leaving the Ridiculous Theatrical Company, Pashalinski appeared in a range of theatrical productions and in film and television. In 1981, she played the jester Trinculo in The Tempest, directed by Lee Breuer at Central Park's Delacorte Theater. She then worked with Richard Foreman, appearing in his 1983 production of Egyptology (My Head Was a Sledgehammer) at The Public Theater and his 1987 production of Film is Evil, Radio Is Good at New York University's Tisch School of the Arts. She performed in Tom Eyen's Give My Regards to Off-Off-Broadway at La MaMa in 1987.

She also worked several times with director/choreographer David Gordon, appearing in his 1983 collaboration with JoAnne Akalitis and Philip Glass, The Photographer, at the Brooklyn Academy of Music, his 1992 production of The Mysteries And What's So Funny at the Joyce Theater, also with music by Glass, and his 1996 production of Punch and Judy Get Divorced. In 1999, she portrayed Gordon in his Autobiography of a Liar at Danspace Project.

She also appeared in film and television, including as the psychiatrist in Mary Harron's I Shot Andy Warhol, as Narc in Peter Sellar's The Cabinet of Dr. Ramirez, as Mona Black in Extremely Loud and Incredibly Close, as Hedy Wormenhoven on One Life to Live, and in smaller roles in All Good Things, The Days and Nights of Molly Dodd, and The Equalizer.

In 1999, she and her partner Linda Chapman performed in a play they wrote called Gertrude & Alice: A Likeness to Loving, based on the relationship between Gertrude Stein and Alice B. Toklas. "I've always loved Gertrude Stein and felt that as a gay woman, I understood her in a way that many biographers did not," Pashalinski told journalist Simi Horowitz for a profile published in Backstage in 2005. "I wanted to explode the myth of what Stein was about... and the play gave me the chance to work with Linda." Pashalinski again portrayed Stein in 2022, in performance artist John Kelly's Underneath the Skin at La MaMa.

== Awards ==
Pashalinski won Obie Awards for Distinguished Performance by an Actress for her performances in the Ridiculous Theatrical Company productions Corn (1973) and Der Ring Gott Farblonjet (1977), and for her performance in Gertrude & Alice (2000).

== Theater ==
Year	Title	Role	Notes				
1970	Bluebeard	Miss Cubbish					
1973	Corn	Lola Lola	Obie Award For Distinguished Performance by an Actress				
1977	Der Ring Gott Farblonjet	Brunhilde	Obie Award For Distinguished Performance by an Actress				
1981	The Tempest	Trinculo					
1983	Egyptology (My Head Was a Sledgehammer)	nurse					
1987	Film is Evil, Radio Is Good	Helena Sovianavitch					
1999/2000	Gertrude & Alice: A Likeness to Loving	Gertrude	Obie Award For Distinguished Performance by an Actress she appeared as a housekeeper in the broadway production of Turgenev's FORTUNE'S FOOL-	2022	Underneath the Skin	Gertrude Stein	(remotely)

== Film ==
Year	Title	Role	Notes
1986	The Sorrows of Dolores	Gypsy Woman	
1987	Anna	Producer	
1987	Ironweed	Fat Woman with Turkey	
1991	The Cabinet of Dr. Ramirez	Narc	
1992	Me and Veronica	Mabel	
1994	North	Operator	
1995	The Pesky Suitor	Babe	short film
1996	I Shot Andy Warhol	Psychiatrist	
1997	Arresting Gena	Mrs. Meanie	
1997	Brokers	Roz	
1998	Godzilla	Pharmacist	
1998	Claire Dolan	Salon Client #2	
1998	Pecker	Pelt Room Announcer	voice
1999	Sweet and Lowdown	Blanche's Friend	
2001	The Sleepy Time Gal	Adoption Agency Director	
2001	K-PAX	Russian Woman	
2006	Little Children	Bridget	
2009	The Private Lives of Pippa Lee	Mrs. Mankievitz	
2010	All Good Things	Woman at Luxor	
2011	Extremely Loud & Incredibly Close	Mona Black	
2019	A Call to Spy	Hilda Atkins	

== Television ==
Year	Title	Role	Notes
1987	The Equalizer	Vera Polivka	Episode: "Encounter in a Closed Room"
1989	The Days and Nights of Molly Dodd	Zekia	Episode: "Here's a Rough Way to Learn a Foreign Language"
1998	Remember WENN	Mrs. Etruscan	Episode: "Some Time, Some Station"
1999	As the World Turns	Rosie	2 episodes
1999	Now and Again	Olga	Episode: "Pulp Turkey"
2009	30 Rock	Cleaning Lady	Episode: "Retreat to Move Forward"
2014	Louie	Mrs. Frame	Episode: "Back"
2014	The Blacklist	Apolonia	Episode: "Monarch Douglas Bank (No. 112)"
2015	Deadbeat	Dottie	Episode: "Last Dance with Edith Jane"
2019	Broad City	Neighbor	Episode: "SheWork and Shit Bucket"
2020	High Maintenance	Cora	Episode: "Soup"
