= Generation Um... =

- Theatrical release poster
- Directed by: Mark L Mann
- Written by: Mark L Mann
- Produced by: Jared Ian Goldman; Alison Palmer; Caroline Kaplan; Lemore Syvan; Cassian Elwes
- Starring: Keanu Reeves; Bojana Novakovic; Adelaide Clemens
- Production companies: Company Films; Voltage Pictures
- Distributed by: Phase 4 Films
- Release dates: July 12, 2012 (Thailand); May 3, 2013 (United States)
- Running time: 96 minutes
- Country: United States
- Language: English
- Budget: $1.7 million

Generation Um... is a 2012 independent drama film about "a New York City family of circumstance" written and directed by Mark L Mann, and starring Keanu Reeves, Adelaide Clemens and Bojana Novakovic. The film was released theatrically in New York City and Los Angeles on May 3, 2013, moving quickly to VOD and DVD.

== Plot ==
Generation Um... is an existential day-in-the-life portrait that immerses the viewer in the downtown mindsets of John Wall (Keanu Reeves), a lost soul who's been circling the New York City drain for too long, and the two party girls he spends his birthday with, Violet (Bojana Novakovic) and Mia (Adelaide Clemens), as they look for light in the darker aspects of their "family of circumstance" and the paths their self-destructive lives have taken.

== Cast ==
- Keanu Reeves as John Wall
- Adelaide Clemens as Mia
- Bojana Novakovic as Violet
- Daniel Sunjata as Charles
- Sarita Choudhury as Lily, the waitress
- Jonny Orsini as Rick
- Jake Hoffman as Rob, the wine store guy
- Karen Olivo as Carrie Hines, the bartender
- Ashley Austin Morris, as girl date
- Ruby Lynn Reyner as Posse Queen

== Reception ==
On review aggregator Rotten Tomatoes, the film holds an approval rating of 0% based on 15 reviews, with an average rating of 3.2/10. On Metacritic, the film has a weighted average score of 25 out of 100, based on 10 critics, indicating "generally unfavorable" reviews.

Justin Chang of Variety called it "a slapped-together sub-mumblecore exercise that at times suggests a feature-length expansion of 2010′s 'Sad Keanu' meme." Stephen Holden of The New York Times wrote in his review, "Just because the characters waste their time doesn’t mean you should waste yours watching them circle the drain."
