= My Face for the World to See =

1997 book by Candy Darling

My Face for the World to See: The Diaries, Letters, and Drawings of Candy Darling, Andy Warhol Superstar
- Author: Candy Darling
- Language: English
- Genre: Autobiography
- Published: 1997
- Publisher: Handy Marks Publications
- Pages: 127
- ISBN: 094536721X
- OCLC: 1102111795

My Face for the World to See (full title: My Face for the World to See: The Diaries, Letters, and Drawings of Candy Darling, Andy Warhol Superstar) is the published diaries of Warhol superstar Candy Darling.

The book is made up of several edited diary entries written at different times and in different journals throughout Darling's short life. It ranges from entries from Darling's childhood in Massapequa Park, Long Island, to later entries towards the end of her life. The book also includes various letters and unprofessional sketches drawn by Darling, who was known to be interested in drawing from childhood. Most pages reflect Darling's desire for appreciation, love, respect, and her longing to belong. Also, the book's pages tell of her dreams, ambitions and wishes; including super-stardom, to be a complete woman, and to marry.

Darling's diary entries also reveal her confusion about her sexuality and gender identity (as she was a pre-operative transgender woman). Her loneliness, desperation, and ultimate frustration at society's refusal to accept her and its rejection of who she truly was are described as well. Darling's life is summarized in a short poem at the end of the book titled "Stardusk".
