= The Mystery of Irma Vep =

Satirical play by Charles Ludlam premiered in 1984

- Written by: Charles Ludlam
- Genre: satire, comedy/horror

Premiere
- Date: September 1984
- Place: One Sheridan Square; New York City

The Mystery of Irma Vep is a play in three acts by Charles Ludlam. It is a satire of several theatrical, literary and film genres, including Victorian melodrama, farce, the penny dreadful, Wuthering Heights and the Alfred Hitchcock film Rebecca (1940). The title refers to the name of a character in the 1915 French movie serial Les Vampires and is an anagram of the word "vampire."

The piece premiered off-Broadway in 1984 and was revived frequently with numerous productions in the US and internationally.

== Background ==
The play is written for two actors who, between them, play eight characters of both sexes. In order to ensure cross-dressing, licenses to perform the play include a stipulation that the actors must be of the same sex. The show requires a large number of sound cues, props, special effects and quick costume changes. Some 35 costume changes take place in the course of the two-hour show.

The comedy includes references to (or appearances by) vampires, ghosts, mummies and werewolves. It contains the occasional jibe of an adult nature, but is largely acceptable for younger audiences. It is played in camp style. Ludlam said, however, "Our slant was actually to take things very seriously, especially focusing on those things held in low esteem by society and revaluing them, giving them new meaning, new worth, by changing their context". Ludlam "twinned an ironic deconstruction of the horror genre with a high-camp celebration of it."

== Productions ==
The Mystery of Irma Vep was first produced by Ludlam's Ridiculous Theatrical Company, opening off-off-Broadway in New York City's Greenwich Village in September 1984 and closing in April 1986. It starred Ludlam as Lady Enid, the new mistress of the manor, and a butler, and Everett Quinton (Ludlam's lover) as Lord Edgar Hillcrest, the master of the manor, and the housekeeper (among other characters). The "Cast and Crew" won a Special Drama Desk Award. Ludlam and Quinton won the 1985 Obie Award for Ensemble Performance.

The show was later produced off-Broadway at the Westside Theatre from September 1998 through July 1999, with Quinton and Stephen DeRosa. The production won the 1999 Lucille Lortel Award for Outstanding Revival, along with Outer Critics Circle Award nominations for Outstanding Revival of a Play, Outstanding Set Design (John Lee Beatty), and Outstanding Costume Design (William Ivey Long).

In 1991, Irma Vep was the most produced play in the United States, and in 2003, it became the longest-running play ever produced in Brazil. It was produced in the West End in London in 1990 at the Ambassadors Theatre, after a season at Leicester's Haymarket Theatre, starring Edward Hibbert and Nickolas Grace. Another New York City production ran at the Lucille Lortel Theatre in 2014.

== Synopsis ==
Mandacrest Estate is the home of Lord Edgar, an Egyptologist, and Lady Enid. Lady Enid is Lord Edgar's second wife, though he has yet to recover entirely from the passing of his first wife, Irma Vep. The house staff, a maid named Jane Twisden and a swineherd named Nicodemus Underwood, have their own opinions of Lady Enid.

Enid is attacked by a vampire, and Edgar seeks answers in an Egyptian tomb, briefly resurrecting the mummy of an Egyptian princess. Returning home with the sarcophagus, Edgar prepares to hunt down the werewolf he blames for the death of his son and first wife. Meanwhile, Enid discovers Irma locked away, supposedly to coax out the location of precious jewels from her. Wresting the keys to Irma's cell from Jane, Enid frees Irma only to discover the prisoner is, in fact, Jane herself, actually a vampire, and the killer of Irma as well as her and Edgar's son. Nicodemus, now a werewolf, kills Jane, only to be shot dead by Edgar.

In the end, Enid prevents Edgar from writing about his experiences in Egypt, revealing she was the princess herself, the whole thing an elaborate sham by her father to discredit Edgar. The two reconcile.
