= Slugger Ann =

American bar owner (1906–1980)

- Born: Ann Uglialoro; April 30, 1906; United States
- Died: July 1, 1980 (aged 74); New York City, U.S.
- Occupation: Businesswoman
- Spouse: Joseph Verra
- Children: 2
- Relatives: Jackie Curtis (grandchild)

Ann Uglialoro, known as Slugger Ann (April 30, 1906 – July 1, 1980), was the owner of Slugger Ann's, a popular bar in the East Village in New York City, which she operated from the 1950s until her death in 1980. She was the grandmother of Jackie Curtis.

== Early life and career ==
Uglialoro was of Italian descent and had two daughters, Josephine and Genevieve Uglialoro. Genevieve was the mother of performance artist Jackie Curtis, whom Slugger Ann largely raised. Jackie frequently visited the bar, and some of Curtis's artistic work was inspired by the clientele at Slugger Ann's. Uglialoro also employed transgender icon Candy Darling as a barmaid.

She earned her nickname "Slugger Ann" while working as a taxi dancer in the 1920s and 1930s in New York City. When men attempted to grope her while dancing, she would punch them. This assertive behavior proved useful when she opened her bar on the corner of 12th Street and 2nd Avenue, near St. Mark's Church, in the early 1950s. Uglialoro was present at the bar daily, lived in an apartment behind it, and served as superintendent for the apartments above the building. Several television shows, including Naked City, were filmed outside the establishment. Slugger Ann resembled Mae West, with a large frame and blonde hair.

== Death and legacy ==
Slugger Ann's closed in 1980 upon Uglialoro's death. The space later became a bar called La Bamba and is currently occupied by the 12th Street Ale House. Slugger Ann's is featured in numerous books about New York City nightlife and the culture of the 1960s and 1970s. A stage play about Slugger Ann and Jackie Curtis was written by her grandson Joe Preston.
