= Jackie Curtis =

American actor, singer, and playwright

- Curtis by Andy Warhol in 1974
- Born: John Curtis Holder Jr. February 19, 1947; New York City, US
- Died: May 15, 1985 (aged 38); New York City, US
- Resting place: Rose Hills Memorial Park, Putnam Valley, New York
- Other name: Shannon Montgomery
- Occupations: Actor; singer; playwright; theater director
- Relatives: Slugger Ann (grandmother)

Jackie Curtis (born John Curtis Holder Jr.; February 19, 1947 – May 15, 1985) was an American drag queen, playwright, actor, and singer. Curtis was associated with the Off-Off-Broadway theater movement and Andy Warhol's Factory scene of the 1960s and 1970s.

Known for performing in both masculine and feminine modes, Curtis developed a distinctive theatrical persona that challenged conventional gender labels. Curtis's drag style often combined deliberately haphazard makeup, chaotic wigs, vintage dresses, runs in stockings, and glitter, pioneering a blend of camp and trashy glamour. Curtis performed with the Play-House of the Ridiculous and wrote and directed plays including Glamour, Glory and Gold (1967), Vain Victory: Vicissitudes of the Damned (1971), and Amerika Cleopatra (1972). Curtis also appeared in the underground films Flesh (1968) and Women in Revolt (1971).

== Early life and family ==
Jackie Curtis was born John Curtis Holder Jr. in New York City on February 19, 1947. His father, John Holder, was a baritone singer in a gospel group that toured Tennessee. His parents separated when he was one year old, and Curtis moved with his mother to New York, where he was raised by his grandmother Ann Uglialoro and aunt Josephine Preston. After being widowed in 1950, Uglialoro became a taxi dancer at the Majestic Ballroom on Broadway, where she acquired the nickname "Slugger Ann." Curtis's mother and aunt also worked at the ballroom. Uglialoro later worked as a cook and, when Curtis was eight, purchased a bar on Second Avenue and 10th Street in the East Village, which she named Slugger Ann's. Curtis grew up in the rooms behind the bar.

After seeing Singin' in the Rain and The Wizard of Oz at age four, Curtis decided he wanted to become a movie star, recalling that he wanted to sing, dance, "and have more than four marriages." He later described feeling out of place among the neighborhood children and spent much of his childhood in movie theaters and Catholic churches with his grandmother. He intermittently attended the High School of Industrial Arts and worked as an usher at the Winter Garden Theatre, where he repeatedly watched Barbra Streisand in Funny Girl. He also frequented the stage door of Once Upon a Mattress to meet his comedic idol, Carol Burnett.

His father called him Jack and his family called him Curtis, while he introduced himself to friends as Jackie Curtis. The name combined his family identity with an androgynous stage name. His half-brother, Timothy Holder, later became an openly gay Episcopal priest.

== Career ==
In 1965, Curtis appeared in Tom Eyen's play Miss Nefertiti Regrets at La MaMa Experimental Theatre Club along with fellow newcomer Bette Midler. Curtis reprised the role as Ptolemy II.

=== Glamour, Glory, and Gold and Lucky Wonderful ===
In the summer of 1967, Curtis met Pop artist Andy Warhol and invited him to the opening of his play Glamour, Glory, and Gold: The Life and Legend of Nola Noonan, Goddess and Star. The play, which chronicled the rise and decline of a female film star, opened in September 1967 at the Playwright's Workshop at Bastiano's Cellar Studio in Manhattan's East Village. The production was directed by Ron Link and starred Candy Darling and Melba LaRose Jr. Curtis also appeared in the production as a supporting chorus dancer. According to the program, Curtis was an emergency replacement after the actress originally cast in the role abruptly left the production. New York Daily News critic Ernest Leogrande described Curtis's performance as "strangely amorphous," neither masculine nor feminine, while emphasizing his comedic talent.

Curtis was also an energetic promoter of the production. Curtis would visit intermissions at established Broadway and Off-Broadway theaters with Darling and LaRose, approaching theatergoers and enthusiastically recommending the play and its performers. Curtis also contacted gossip columnists and theater critics to generate publicity for the production.

Glamour, Glory, and Gold received favorable notices from publications including the New York Post, New York Daily News, Back Stage, and Show Business, with particular praise directed toward LaRose's performance. In The New York Times, critic Dan Sullivan described the play as being "written and played with the outrageous broadness of a Gay Nineties melodrama, and in its heartless, campy, ramshackle way it is fun." Sullivan noted that Curtis "has perfect pitch when it comes to registering movie clichés ('I don't need you! I don't need anyone! I'm STAR!'), and a good silly time is had by all."

Curtis took the starring roles in his following plays. He followed up his theatrical debut with the musical Lucky Wonderful in March 1968. The production featured Candy Darling, Paul Serrato, Holly Woodlawn, and Melba LaRose. The playboy socialite Tommy Manville, who had a number of odd and exotic spouses, served as the inspiration for the play.

In July 1968, Glamour, Glory, and Gold was revived at the Playwright's Workshop. According writer Cynthia Carr, neither Curtis nor Darling took part, but both were involved when rehearsals began. Robert De Niro appeared in the production in his first stage role, playing several different male roles, while Paula Shaw portrayed Nola Noonan. De Niro received a favorable reviews for his performance.

Around this time, Curtis began taking female hormones and developed an unconventional style of drag, sometimes wearing torn dresses held together with safety pins, runs in her stockings, and lipstick and foundation applied over an unshaven face. Woodlawn recalled Curtis's deliberately disheveled appearance, while Harvey Fierstein, who appeared in one of Curtis'ss plays, remembered a night when Curtis wore a wig that had melted under the dressing-room lights and smelled of burning rubber. Fierstein recalled that Curtis's attitude was: "I don't want to look like anybody else."

=== Emergence as a Warhol superstar and Play-House of the Ridiculous ===
While Warhol was recovering from a near-fatal shooting in the summer of 1968, filmmaker Paul Morrissey wanted to cast Candy Darling in Flesh. Unable to reach Darling, Morrissey contacted Curtis and asked him to relay the filming schedule. Curtis recalled that Morrissey then added, "Why don't you come along too and be in it?" The performers Morrissey cast in his Warhol-produced films became the last of the Warhol superstars. The film follows a day in the life of a hustler, played by Joe Dallesandro. Curtis appears in a scene with Darling and Geri Miller.

In 1969, Curtis became associated with the Play-House of the Ridiculous. After the troupe was invited to perform at a University of Notre Dame conference on pornography, Curtis traveled with the company to Indiana, appearing in Ronald Tavel's The Life of Lady Godiva, directed by John Vaccaro. Vacarro later recalled that Curtis wore a dress in public for the first time on the trip, following an epiphany after taking LSD on New Year's Eve 1968.

On the return journey, Curtis wrote Heaven Grand in Amber Orbit, his second play, after deriving its title from two horses listed in a racing form. The original version was set in a Forty-second Street Bickford's, with its characters named after racehorses. Vaccaro directed a substantially reworked production, transforming Curtis's comedy into a grotesque, musical antiwar play set among sideshow performers, reflecting the political climate of the Vietnam War.

Curtis also performed in Tom Murrin's Cock-Strong in 1969, singing "Talking Dirty to the One You Love." The production ended with a giant phallus falling toward the audience and spraying glitter. In 1970, Curtis's Heaven Grand in Amber Orbit, starring Ruby Lynn Reyner and Holly Woodlawn, was staged by the Play-House. That year, Curtis also wrote Femme Fatale, which starred Patti Smith, Jayne County, and Penny Arcade.

Curtis then starred in Women in Revolt (1971) with fellow Warhol superstars Candy Darling and Holly Woodlawn, which satirizes the Women's Liberation Movement and alludes to Valerie Solanas and her SCUM Manifesto. Richard Avedon photographed Curtis with Woodlawn and Darling for the June 1972 issue of Vogue magazine.

=== Vain Victory and Amerika Cleopatra ===
Curtis wrote Vain Victory: The Vicissitudes Of The Damned and co-directed a production of the play in 1971. The play starred Candy Darling and Mario Montez, amongst others. After six months of rehearsals, Vain Victory opened at the La MaMa Experimental Theatre Club on May 26, 1971, to heavy demand. The 99-seat theater was filled beyond capacity, and the 10:00 p.m. curtain was held for an hour and a half at Warhol's request while he finished dinner with John Lennon and Yoko Ono, who were also planning to attend. The opening-night audience also included Tally Brown and Peter Allen, all of whom had been advertised as members of the cast. Warhol, billed as the "Winged Avenger," took Polaroids from the audience but did not perform. Allen accompanied Darling on "Butt Blues," a song he had written, while Brown performed a song. Lennon called it "the best play I've ever seen."

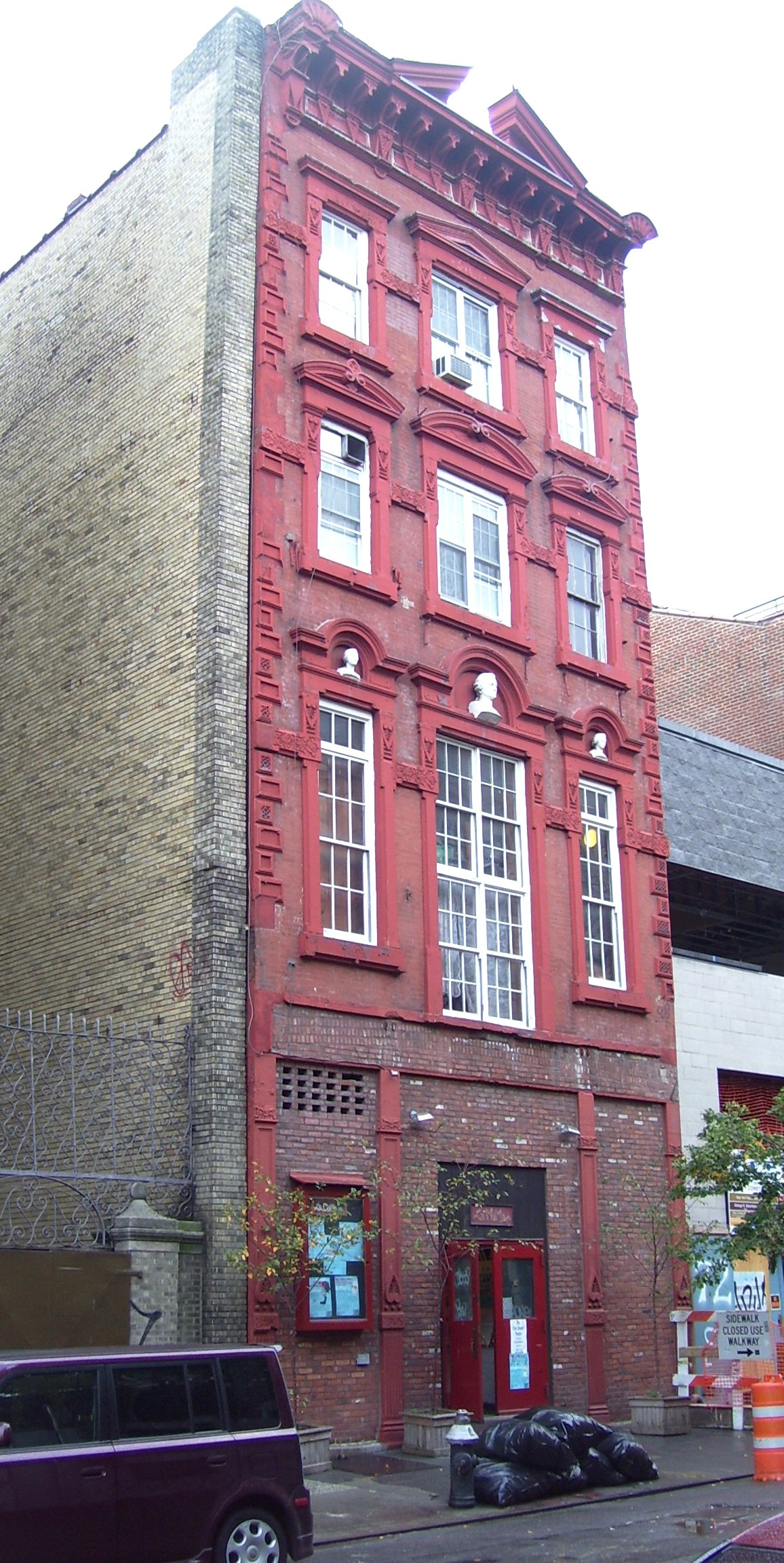
Curtis presented several plays at La MaMa Experimental Theatre Club, located at 74A East 4th Street in Manhattan's East Village

After Vain Victory closed at La MaMa, Curtis immediately reworked it as a musical. She collaborated with composer and musician Paul Serrato, who had written music for Lucky Wonderful. Serrato recalled that Curtis had "a musical ear" and good pitch and rhythm. For the new Vain Victory, they incorporated "My Place Tonight," a song from Lucky Wonderful that Darling particularly liked, and added "White Shoulders Black and Blue," which Curtis wrote for Darling.

The reprised Vain Victory opened at the WPA Theatre on August 11, 1971. The 65-seat theater regularly accommodated about 75 people, and the production became regarded as the definitive version of Vain Victory. Darling played Donna Bella Beads, a mermaid confined to a wheelchair who falls in love with a rock star played by Curtis. The production also featured dancer Larry Ree, who performed a version of The Dying Swan. Curtis's production was later featured in the second episode of the PBS documentary series An American Family, which followed Pat Loud during a visit to her son Lance at the Chelsea Hotel; footage showed Curtis descending a staircase while singing "The Beige Hair Dryer Song."

The WPA Theatre production of Vain Victory closed on September 5, 1971, but Curtis continued developing the play. A third version opened on September 23 at the Village Arena Theatre. Neither Darling nor Ambrose appeared in the production; Ambrose had left after requesting a pay increase from $25 to $65 a week, matching Darling’s salary. Despite the ticket price rising from $3 to $4, Curtis declined his request.

In 1972, Amerika Cleopatra, written by Curtis under the direction of Harvey Tavel, ran at the WPA Theatre. The play featured Alexis Del Lago as Charmn Gale and Agosto Machado as Lady Iras. Dick Brukenfeld of The Village Voice gave Americka Cleopatra a mixed review, describing parts of the first act as "diverting" but arguing that the play "had nowhere to go." He criticized the work for presenting transsexual fantasies as "nothing more than an exhibit" and contended that the material required "further elaboration and shaping" to make it compelling.

=== Later career ===
In 1974, Curtis presented the third production of Glamour, Glory, and Gold at Fortune Theatre. That year, Curtis and Holly Woodlawn performed together in "Cabaret in the Sky: An Evening with Holly Woodlawn and Jackie Curtis" at the New York Cultural Center. The poster for the show was designed by Interview magazine illustrator Richard Bernstein.

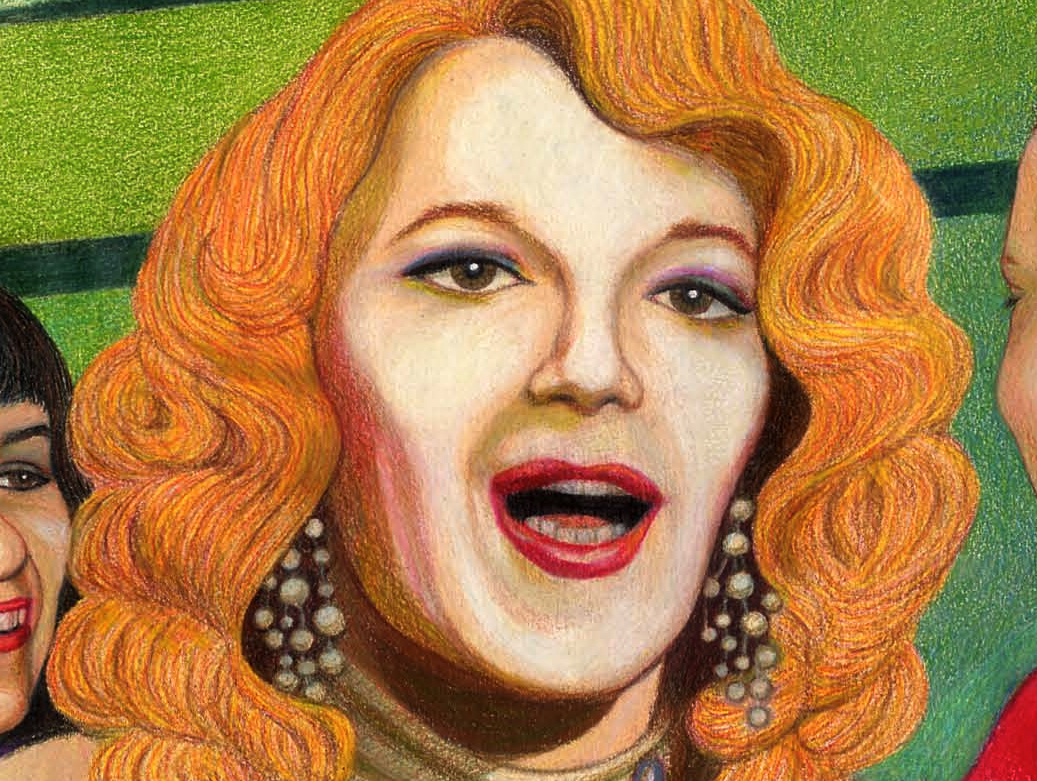
Painting by Gary LeGault of Jackie Curtis at SNAFU in 1980

The poem "B-Girls" by Curtis, much of which is based on observations of people who visited grandmother Slugger Ann's bar, was included in the 1979 book The Poets' Encyclopedia.

Curtis directed and performed in Nick Markovich's I Died Yesterday at La MaMa in 1983. Curtis portrayed a nurse in the documentary film Burroughs (1983).

Curtis's final play Champagne ran at La MaMa Experimental Theatre Club January 3–27, 1985 and featured George Abagnalo as the male lead.

In 1985, Curtis used the name Shannon Montgomery and started going to the HB Studio for acting classes. Photographer Francesco Scavullo took new headshots of Curtis and he began to audition for male parts in soap operas and plays in New York.

== Personal life ==
=== Relationships ===
Curtis had numerous non-legal marriages between 1969 and 1984.

Curtis had arranged to marry Warhol superstar Eric Emerson as a publicity stunt on July 21, 1969. When Emerson failed to show up, Curtis married a wedding guest, Stewart Eaglespeed (Stuart Lichtenstein), on the roof at 211 East 11th Street, where Curtis was living. The mock wedding was covered by The Village Voice.

On October 29, 1970, Curtis married Archie Dukeshire; they divorced on April 17, 1971.

On November 27, 1971, Curtis married Hunter Cayce; they divorced on January 5, 1972.

On February 14, 1972, Curtis married actor Hiram Keller; they divorced on March 1, 1973.

On June 9, 1973, Curtis married TV personality Lance Loud; they divorced on August 7, 1975.

On December 24, 1976, Curtis married Peter Groby; they divorced on May 14, 1978.

On July 23, 1980, Curtis married Kevin McPhee; they divorced on September 14, 1981.

Curtis had his last wedding ceremony on May 26, 1984, with Gary Majchrzak as the groom and Curtis being given away by art dealer Leo Castelli.

=== Gender identity ===
Throughout his adult life, Curtis moved between masculine and feminine forms of presentation, both onstage and in everyday life, and resisted conventional gender labels. In 1968, Curtis began taking female hormones and living as a woman, but soon stopped and developed an unconventional style of drag. Curtis subsequently move back and forth between genders, sometimes using male or female hormones. LaRose recalled that Curtis's use of hormones was so extensive that Curtis's doctor was astonished that he was alive, and added, "I never thought of Jackie as a 'she.' Jackie was Jackie and that's what he'd always say." In a 1969 interview with The New York Times, Curtis stated: "Not a boy, not a girl, not a faggot, not a drag queen, not a transsexual—just me, Jackie... I'm not trying to pass as a woman."

Curtis later told biographer Craig Highberger, "I feel trapped as a boy," but explained, "I don't feel like a woman trapped in the body of a male. Candy and Holly take female hormones and talk about having sex-change operations. That is not for me at all, because my body is my body, and my sex is my sex, and my ambiguity is my ambiguity. And I cling to that, fervently." Bob Colacello, former editor of Interview, contrasted Curtis's approach with that of Darling in his memoir Holy Terror: Andy Warhol Close Up (1990):

Unlike Candy, who desperately wanted people to believe she was a woman and hated being labeled a drag queen or transvestite, Jackie said, 'I got balls under my ballgown and I don't care who knows it.' Candy was a true believer; for her Hollywood was holy, and twentieth-century American culture began and ended at Twentieth Century-Fox. Candy wanted to be the flawless blonde bombshell of the Fabulous Fifties. Jackie was too original for that. He/she was closer to what the seventies were about, mixups and mixtures, one day James Dean, the next Joan Crawford, or Lucille Ball. The only thing that Jackie never changed was his/her name.

Warhol recalled in his memoir POPism: The Warhol '60s (1980), "Jackie I always called 'him' since I'd known him before he went into drag, and Candy Darling and Holly Woodlawn were 'her' because they were already in it when I met up with them." When Warhol attended a Boy George concert in 1984, he remarked in his diary, "I just couldn't like him because it reminded me of what Jackie Curtis could have been."

In a 1985 conversation with Michael Musto of The Village Voice, Curtis said of his evolving self-presentation: "I'd say I'm tired of being Jackie Curtis, and somebody would say, But you have to be. We need Jackie. But it was a chore. And I was already turning my autosuggestive possession into a reincarnation of James Dean. I wanted to play James Dean, so I became him." Photographer Peter Hujar documented this complexity in a posthumous image showing Curtis in his casket wearing a suit, placed beside a photograph of himself in drag.

== Death ==
Curtis died from a heroin overdose in New York City on May 15, 1985. His wake was held at the Andrett Funeral Home, while the funeral service took place in St. Ann Church in Manhattan. Curtis was laid to rest wearing a suit, with a white flower on his lapel and his hair slicked back. A plaque bearing the words "John Holder, a.k.a. Jackie Curtis" and show business mementos were placed inside his coffin. Photographs of Curtis in drag were displayed on poster boards.

Upon hearing news of Curtis's death, Warhol recorded in his diary, "It was an awful day... somebody called and said that Jackie Curtis O.D.'d. He's gone. And that wasn't something I wanted to hear". The following week, Warhol said, "Somebody told me that Jackie Curtis had a long obituary in The New York Times. I still keep wanting to think it was a put-on like his weddings".

== Influence and legacy ==
Curtis deliberately rejected conventional drag, appearing with stubble, ripped tights, thrift-store gowns, haphazard makeup, exaggerated eyelashes and wigs, and glitter. Singer Jayne County identified Curtis as a major influence on her early career. In her memoir Man Enough to Be a Woman (1995), County recalled: "She knew she was eccentric, a freak, but in some weird way she visualised herself as Garbo or Marlene Dietrich. She had that combination of trash and glamour, and it made a really big impression on me. … Nobody else was dressing like this at the time. Jackie was a total innovator."

In Craig Highberger's 2004 documentary Superstar in a Housedress: The Life and Legend of Jackie Curtis, performer Penny Arcade said Curtis "ushered in that period of not trying to look real." Arcade explained that "what everybody was going for in drag up until Jackie Curtis was realness. That was the criterion, how 'real' did you look?” Jackie could never hope to look real...so Jackie didn't use falsies. Jackie used his own eroticism." Curtis's androgynous aesthetic has subsequently been associated with the development of glam rock and gender-nonconforming drag.

In 2012, Jukebox Jackie: Snatches of Jackie Curtis, a musical revue conceived and directed by Scott Wittman, was presented at La MaMa as part of the theater's 50th-anniversary season. The production, featuring Justin Vivian Bond, Bridget Everett, Cole Escola, and Steel Burkhardt, drew on Curtis's plays, poetry, journals, films, and songs to create a collage of Curtis's life and work.

== In pop culture ==
Curtis appeared on the cover of Gay Power in 1969, "New York's first homosexual newspaper."

Curtis is a subject of the painting, Jackie Curtis and Ritta Redd (1970) by artist Alice Neel, which is in the collection of the Cleveland Museum of Art in Cleveland, Ohio. In 1972, Neal also painted the portrait Jackie Curtis as a Boy, which is in the collection of Femmes Artistes du Musée de Mougins in Mougins, France.

Curtis is named in Lou Reed's 1972 song "Walk on the Wild Side" which was about the 'superstars' he knew from Warhol's Factory. The verse speaks of her drug addiction and fascination with James Dean: "Jackie is just speeding away / Thought she was James Dean for a day / Then I guess she had to crash / Valium would have helped that bash".

== Works ==
=== Stage plays ===
- Glamour, Glory, and Gold: The Life and Legend of Nola Noonan, Goddess and Star (1967)
- Lucky Wonderful (1968)
- Heaven Grand in Amber Orbit (1970)
- Femme Fatale: The Three Faces of Gloria (1970)
- Vain Victory: Vicissitudes of the Damned (1971)
- Amerika Cleopatra (1972)
- Tyrone X (1979)
- I Died Yesterday (1983) (play written by Nick Markovich with additional dialogue by Curtis)
- Champagne (1985)

== Filmography ==
Year	Title	Notes
1968	Flesh	role as Jackie
1971	W.R.: Mysteries of the Organism	
1971	Women in Revolt	role as Jackie
1971	An American Family	1 episode
1973	The Corner Bar	1 episode
1980	Underground U.S.A.	role as a nurse
1983	Burroughs	role as a nurse
2002	The Cockettes	archival footage
2004	Superstar in a Housedress	archival footage
2010	Beautiful Darling	archival footage
