= Black-Eyed Susan (actress) =

American actress

Black-Eyed Susan (born Susan Carlson) is an American actress based in New York City, New York.

She has worked primarily in Off-Off-Broadway theater with artists including Charles Ludlam, Ethyl Eichelberger, Mabou Mines, John Jesurun, Jim Neu, Lola Pashalinski, and Taylor Mac.

== Early life and education ==
Carlson was born in Shelton, Connecticut.

She studied theater for one year at Emerson College, then transferred to Hofstra University, where she completed her degree.

== Career ==
While at Hofstra, she met fellow student, Charles Ludlam, who cast her in one of his early plays. After finishing college, she moved to Manhattan.

In 1967, she was in rehearsals for a Theatre of the Ridiculous production directed by John Vaccaro and written by Ludlam. During rehearsals, Vacarro and Ludlam had a disagreement which led Ludlam to leave the company and began his own, which he called the Ridiculous Theatrical Company. Its first production was called When Queens Collide. Black-Eyed Susan became a long-time friend, collaborator, and actor in Ludlam's work for the following two decades.

During her time working with Ludlam, she met and began to collaborate with Ethyl Eichelberger. Eichelberger wrote the play Saint Joan for Black-Eyed Susan following Ludlam's death in 1987.

Black-Eyed Susan performed in numerous productions at La MaMa Experimental Theatre Club. In 1970, she was in Bluebeard, directed at La MaMa by Ludlam and performed by his Ridiculous Theatrical Company. She was the narrator in Eichelberger's Phedre and Oedipus at La MaMa in 1977. She was in Jesurun's Red House at La MaMa in 1984 and his Deep Sleep at La MaMa in 1986, performing alongside Steve Buscemi in both productions. She was in Jesurun's Black Maria at La MaMa in 1987.

She acted in the 1987 film Ironweed, but has always preferred theatre acting.

In 1989, Stuart Sherman made a short film about her titled Black-Eyed Susan: Portrait of an Actress. In 2014, she received a Foundation for Contemporary Arts Grants to Artists Award.
