= Ruby and the Rednecks =

American rock band

- Origin: New York City, U.S.
- Genres: Glam rock; Punk rock; Glam punk
- Years active: 1970–2024
- Label: Poo Poo Platters
- Website: www.rubyandtherednecks.com

Ruby and the Rednecks is an American rock band from New York City, inspired by the New York Dolls and created by the singer, songwriter, playwright and actress Ruby Lynn Reyner with collaborating musical artists in 1970 and active until today. The band was originally composed of Ruby Lynn Reyner (lead vocals), John Madera (guitar and backing vocal), George Basley (drums), Augie Sabini (saxophone), Bobby Kent (drums), Susan Lampert (keyboard and backing vocal), and Danny Couse (bass guitar), but currently has a new formation. From the original group, only Lampert remains. Ruby wrote most of the lyrics herself. John Madera was praised as a guitar player.

Currently they are mostly playing at Max's Kansas City and CBGB's Reunions.

== History ==
The band formed during glam rock era in the 1970s in New York. They debuted at the Mercer Arts Center opening for New York Dolls, where Patti Smith used to read poetry to open the concerts for Ruby and the Rednecks and other bands such as Teenage Lust and the New York Dolls. Michael Arian said, "Ruby was just extraordinary and was very, very entertaining". Ruby and the Rednecks were one of the staples of the Mercer's scene, appearing on the bill at the New Year's Eve 1972 gig with the Modern Lovers, Suicide, Jayne County, and the New York Dolls. In 1973, the building housing the Mercer Arts Center collapsed and Max's Kansas City and CBGB's became the stage for bands like the New York Dolls, Suicide, Television, the Dictators, and the Ramones. Thus the group became part of the early punk rock movement, and performed on the New York Club circuit during the 1970s with other noted artists including the Ramones, Talking Heads, Blondie, the Patti Smith Group and the New York Dolls.

Ruby and the Rednecks released two albums produced by Peter Crowley and Ruby Lynn Reyner: From the Wrong side of Town and Live Again! At CBGB's.

== Original members ==
- Ruby Lynn Reyner – lead vocals
- John Madera – guitar and backing vocal
- George Basley – drums
- Augie Sabini – saxophone
- Bobby Kent – drums
- Susan Lampert – keyboard and backing vocal
- Ralph Czitron on bass

== Other members ==
- Steeve Greenfield – saxophones
- Mike Grner – fretless bar guitar
- Ron Salvo – drums
- Emma 'Cha Cha' – channing – backing vocals
- 'Wil' Bill Thompson – guitars
- Sonic Uke – ukuleles
- Danny Couse – bass and keyboards
- Mary Rodriguez – drums and bass
- Doug Sako – drums

== Discography ==
=== Albums ===
- From the Wrong Side of Town
- Live Again! At CBGB's

=== Compilation albums ===
- Max's Kansas City 1976 & Beyond (2017)
- Rock and Roll Lips: The Best of Ruby and the Rednecks
- Nightclubbing: The Birth of Punk Rock in NYC
