= Everett Quinton =

American actor (1952–2023)

- Born: December 18, 1951; Brooklyn, New York, U.S.
- Died: January 23, 2023 (aged 71); Brooklyn, New York, U.S.
- Education: Hunter College (attended)
- Occupation: Actor · writer
- Partner: Charles Ludlam
- Military career
- Branch: United States Air Force

Everett Quinton (December 18, 1951 – January 23, 2023) was an American actor and writer.

== Early life and education ==
Quinton was born and raised in Brooklyn. His father was employed by the United States Postal Service and his mother was a postal worker. He attended Hunter College for two years.

== Career ==
Quinton served in the United States Air Force in Thailand before pursuing a career as a theatre actor. He assumed management of the Ridiculous Theatrical Company after the death of his romantic partner and collaborator Charles Ludlam. He had roles in the films Natural Born Killers, Pollock, and Bros.

== Filmography ==
=== Film ===
Year	Title	Role	Notes
1986	Legal Eagles	Attorney #1	
1986	Forever, Lulu	Waiter	
1986	The Sorrows of Dolores	Dolores	Also writer
1987	From the Hip	Warren	
1987	Deadly Illusion	Third Clerk	
1987	Hello Again	Occultist #4	
1988	Big Business	Window Dresser	
1994	Natural Born Killers	Deputy Warden Wurlitzer	
2000	Pollock	James Johnson Sweeney	
2017	After Louie	Julian	
2022	Bros	Melvin Funk	

=== Television ===
Year	Title	Role	Notes
1985	Miami Vice	Homosexual Pusher	Episode: "The Prodigal Son"
1997	Law & Order	Jeffrey Weiss	Episode: "Passion"
2013	Nurse Jackie	Bloody Drunk	Episode: "Luck of the Drawing"
2014	The Louise Log	Ethelred	8 episodes
