= Beautiful Darling =

- Directed by: James Rasin
- Written by: James Rasin
- Produced by: Jeremiah Newton; Elisabeth Bentley; Gill Holland
- Starring: John Waters; Fran Lebowitz; Holly Woodlawn; Paul Morrissey
- Narrated by: Chloë Sevigny; Patton Oswalt
- Cinematography: Martina Radwan
- Edited by: Zachary Stuart-Pontier
- Music by: Louis Durra
- Distributed by: Corinth Films
- Release date: February 12, 2010 (Berlinale)
- Running time: 82 minutes
- Country: United States
- Language: English

Beautiful Darling: The Life and Times of Candy Darling, Andy Warhol Superstar is a 2010 feature-length documentary film about Candy Darling, pioneering trans woman, actress and Andy Warhol superstar. The film was written and directed by James Rasin and features Chloë Sevigny as "the voice of Candy Darling", reading from Candy's private diaries and letters. Patton Oswalt voices Andy Warhol and Truman Capote. It also features interviews with Factory regulars such as Paul Morrissey, Vincent Fremont, Bob Colacello, Gerard Malanga, Pat Hackett, George Abagnalo, and Fran Lebowitz as well as an archival interview with playwright Tennessee Williams. Louis Durra composed the score.

== Film festival history ==
Beautiful Darling had its world premiere as an official selection of the 60th Berlin International Film Festival in February 2010. The film's United States premiere took place in April, 2010 in New York City as an official selection of the 39th New Directors/New Films Festival, a co-presentation of The Museum of Modern Art and the Film Society of Lincoln Center. On October 23, 2010, it won the Gold Hugo award for Best Documentary at the 46th Chicago International Film Festival. It also won Best Film at the Montenegro International Documentary Film Festival (UnderhillFest).

In all, Beautiful Darling was an official selection of over thirty international film festivals, including the Sydney Film Festival, the Vienna International Film Festival, the Taipei Golden Horse Film Festival, and the Seattle International Film Festival. It was also given special screenings at the Hirshhorn Museum at the Smithsonian Institution and The National Gallery of Art in Washington, D.C., The Museum of Modern Art in New York City, The Andy Warhol Museum in Pittsburgh, and the Walker Art Center in Minneapolis.

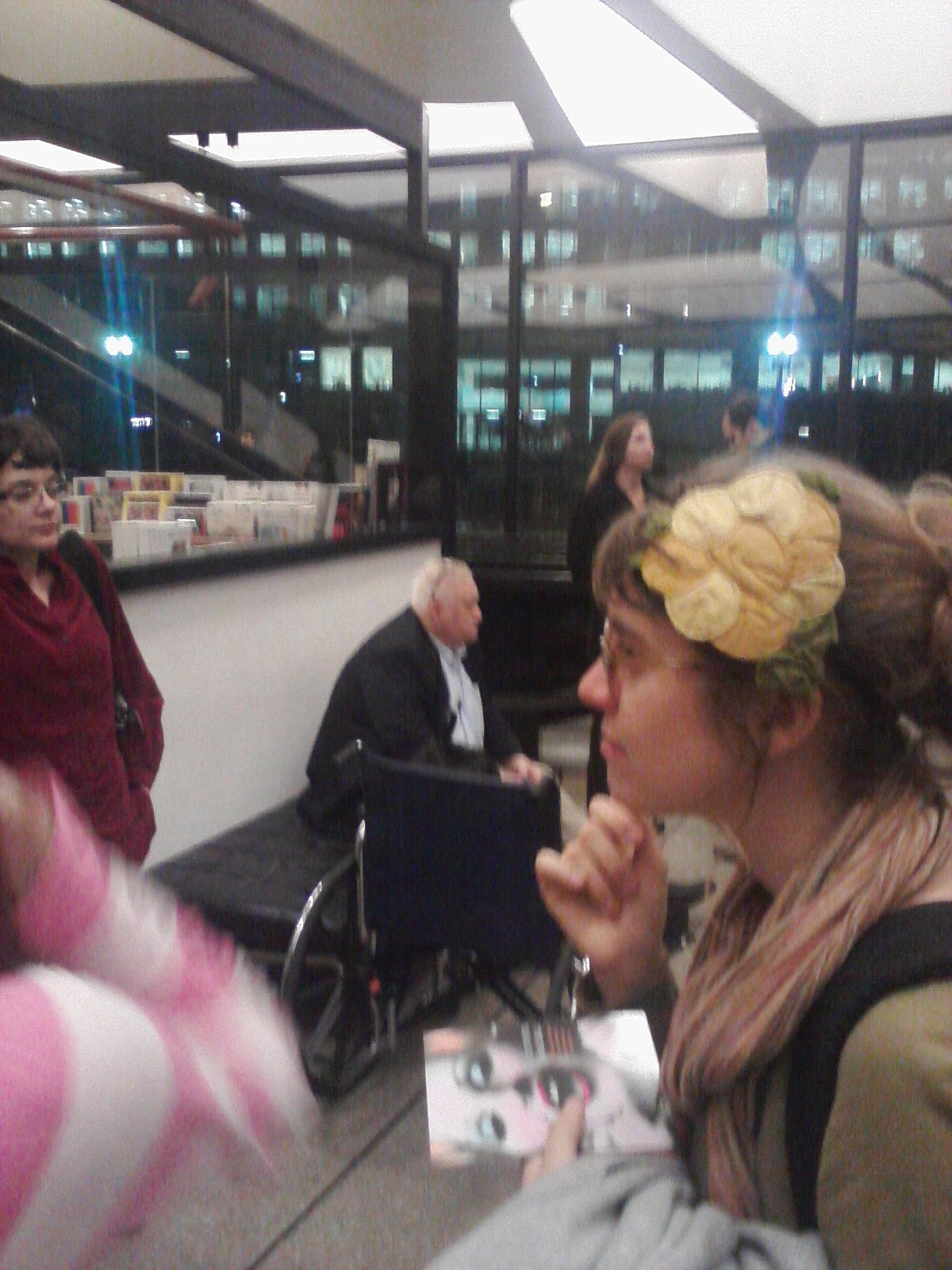
Jeremiah Newton (seated) in the Hirshhorn Museum for a Beautiful Darling screening on November 4, 2010

== Release ==
Distributed by Corinth Films, Beautiful Darling opened at the IFC Center cinemas in New York City on April 22, 2011. Due to its critical and box office success, the film's one week run at the IFC was extended for a month, and the film then played in other selected cities around the country including Los Angeles, Chicago and Boston. In February 2012, Corinth Films released the official DVD of the film.
