= Superstar in a Housedress =

2004 Documentary film

- Directed by: Craig Highberger
- Starring: Jackie Curtis, Holly Woodlawn, Penny Arcade, Joe Dallesandro, Paul Morrissey, Harvey Fierstein, Lily Tomlin
- Release date: 2004
- Country: United States

Superstar in a Housedress (2004) is a feature-length documentary by independent filmmaker Craig Highberger about the life and legend of Warhol superstar Jackie Curtis. Highberger also wrote the biography of the same name, published by Penguin imprint Chamberlain Bros. in 2005. The film includes interviews with surviving superstars Holly Woodlawn, Penny Arcade and Joe Dallesandro; as well as Paul Morrissey, the director of the Warhol films Flesh and Women In Revolt that Jackie appeared in; and Tony Award winners Harvey Fierstein, and Lily Tomlin who also narrates. The film also includes twenty friends and colleagues of Curtis who round out the story of the artist's life. Rare footage includes Curtis performing in Vain Victory, Heaven Grand in Amber Orbit, and Glamour, Glory and Gold.
