= Louis Durra =

American jazz musician

Louis Durra (aka John Louis Durra) is an American pianist and composer living in Berlin, Germany.

== Discography ==
- Rocket Science—CD, (September 2012)
- Head Radio Retransmissions -- (1 track on ESC Radiohead compilation CD) 2012 ESC Records
- The Best Of All Possible Worlds—CD, 2012–7 weeks on CMJ Jazz Top 40 Radio Charts.
- Mad World EP—CD, 2011
- Tangled Up In Blue EP—CD, 2011
- What We Have—CD, 2007
- Caught! Louis Durra Trio Live And In The Studio—DVD, 2007
- Dreaming—CD, 2003

(Other Projects)

- 2011—A Singer Named Shotgun Throat—Moris Tepper
- 2006-2011—piano for 9 documentaries, composer Miriam Cutler
- 2008—Chinese Leftovers— Sugarplum Fairies
- 2008—One Day— Logan Heftel
- 2007 -- "Play It Cool" Cast Album—Mark Winkler
- 2003—Introspective Raincoat Student Music—Sugarplum Fairies
- 2002—Flake—Sugarplum Fairies
- 2000—Moth to Mouth—Moris Tepper
- 1996—Big Enough to Disappear—Moris Tepper

== Touring and performing ==
- Jazz Bar in Edinburgh, UK. 2012
- Jazz Bar in Edinburgh, UK. 2011
- South Beverly Grill, Beverly Hills, CA since 2010.
- Bandera, Brentwood, CA since 2012.
- Pianist for Richard Shelton 2011
- Pianist for Taylor Negron and Lili Haydn 2007
- Pianist for Steve Zee. 2009-2011
- Music Director for "Play It Cool". Louis was nominated in 2006 for an Ovation Award and Los Angeles Drama Circle Award for Musical Direction, for the production of Play it Cool at the Celebration Theatre
- Pianist for "Just In Time" in Russia, Ukraine, Latvia and Kazakhstan. 2003
- Pianist for Jazz Tap Ensemble 1990-1996
- keyboardist for Moris Tepper 1987-1993
- Music Director/Pianist for "Woyzeck" (play) dir. John Wills Martin, Edinburgh 1988
- Music Director/Pianist for "The Lesson" (play) dir. Peter Brosius, Mark Taper Forum, Los Angeles 1989. Louis was nominated for a 1990 Drama Logue award.
- Music Director/Pianist for "Rio Esmeralda" (play) dir. Peter Brosius, LATC and Reykjavik, Iceland 1987

== Sound Editing ==
Louis edited sound with the Id Group, an audio post facility.
