= Old Reliable Theatre Tavern =

Former theater and bar in Manhattan, New York

Coordinates: 40.72251°N 73.98228°W

The Old Reliable Theatre Tavern (or The O.R.) was a theater and bar located at 213 E. 3rd Street in the Alphabet City neighborhood of New York City's East Village, and played a vital part of the early Off-Off-Broadway scene. The Old Reliable presented plays by Guy Gauthier, Ilsa Gilbert, William M. Hoffman, Michael McGrinder, Stanley Nelson, Jeannine O'Reilly, Robert Patrick, Joseph Renard, Donald Kvares and Thomas Terefenko.

The Old Reliable was initially a working-class Polish bar, until late 1963 when the owner sought to turn it into a "Village bar", with the advice of a passing hipster. The neighborhood around the Old Reliable was dangerous during its heyday; popular actor/director Neil Flanagan quipped, "It's easy to find. Just turn left at the burning automobile." Playwright Jeannine O'Reilly said, "It's no wonder we get such good audiences. Everyone's afraid to come here alone." Robert Patrick described the neighborhood as "downtown Lebanon". There was for a period of time a Second Avenue bar called Downtown Beirut.
