= Charles Ludlam =

American actor, director, and playwright (1943–1987)

- Charles Ludlam in costume
- Born: April 12, 1943; Floral Park, New York, United States
- Died: May 28, 1987 (aged 44); New York, New York, United States
- Education: Hofstra University
- Partner: Everett Quinton

Charles Braun Ludlam (April 12, 1943 – May 28, 1987) was an American actor, director, and playwright.

== Biography ==
=== Early life ===
Ludlam was born in Floral Park, New York, the son of Marjorie (née Braun) and Joseph William Ludlam. He was raised in Greenlawn, New York, and attended Harborfields High School. He was openly gay, and performed in plays with the Township Theater Group, a community theatre in Huntington, and worked backstage at the Red Barn Theater, a summer stock theatre in Northport. During his senior year of high school, Ludlam directed, produced, and performed plays with a group of friends, students from Huntington, Northport, Greenlawn, and Centerport. Their "Students Repertory Theatre", housed in the loft studio beneath the Posey School of Dance on Main Street in Northport, seated an audience of 25, and was sold out for every performance. Their repertoire included Kan Kikuchi's Madman on the Roof; Theatre of the Soul; a readers' theatre adaptation of Edgar Lee Masters' Spoon River Anthology; and plays by August Strindberg and Eugene O'Neill.

He received a degree in dramatic literature from Hofstra University in 1964. At Hofstra, Ludlam met Black-Eyed Susan, whom he cast in one of his college productions. The two became close friends, and Black-Eyed Susan performed in more of Ludlam's plays over the following decades than any other actor, except Ludlam himself.

=== Career ===
Ludlam joined John Vaccaro's Play-House of the Ridiculous, and after a falling out, founded his own Ridiculous Theatrical Company in 1967. His first plays were rudimentary exercises; starting with Bluebeard, he began writing more structured plays, which were often pastiches of gothic novels; works by Federico Garcia Lorca, Shakespeare, and Richard Wagner; and popular culture and old movies. These works were humorous but had serious undertones. After seeing one of Ludlam's plays, theater critic Brendan Gill famously remarked, "This isn't farce. This isn't absurd. This is absolutely ridiculous!". Ludlam commented on his own work:

I would say that my work falls into the classical tradition of comedy. Over the years there have been certain traditional approaches to comedy. As a modern artist you have to advance the tradition. I want to work within the tradition so that I don't waste my time trying to establish new conventions. You can be very original within the established conventions.

Ludlam's Bluebeard was produced at La MaMa Experimental Theatre Club, where Vaccaro's company was in residence, in March 1970. Ludlam performed in this production as Khanazar von Bluebeard. Black-Eyed-Susan, Lola Pashalinski, and Mario Montez also performed in this production. In 1976 he appeared in Rosa von Praunheim's New York film Underground and Emigrants.

He taught and/or staged productions at New York University, Connecticut College, Yale University, and Carnegie Mellon University. He won fellowships from the Guggenheim, Rockefeller, and Ford Foundations, and grants from the National Endowment for the Arts and the New York State Council on the Arts. He won six Obie Awards over the course of his career, including a Sustained Excellence Obie Award two weeks before his death in 1987, and won the Rosamund Gilder Award for distinguished achievement in the theater in 1986.

Ludlam often appeared in his plays, and was particularly noted for his female roles. He wrote one of the first plays to address, though indirectly, the AIDS epidemic. His most well-known play is The Mystery of Irma Vep, in which two actors play seven roles in a pastiche of gothic horror novels. The original production featured Ludlam and his partner Everett Quinton. Rights to perform the play include a stipulation that the actors must be of the same sex, to ensure cross-dressing in the production. In 1991, Irma Vep was the most produced play in the United States; and in 2003, it became the longest-running production ever staged in Brazil.

=== Death and legacy ===
Ludlam was diagnosed with AIDS in March 1987. He attempted to fight the disease with his lifelong interest in healthy eating and a macrobiotic diet, but died a month after his AIDS diagnosis, of PCP pneumonia, at St. Vincent's Hospital. His front page obituary in The New York Times was the newspaper's first page 1 obituary to specifically name AIDS as a cause of death (with Ludlam's parents' consent), instead of the AIDS-related illnesses such as pneumonia commonly cited at the time.

The block in front of his Sheridan Square theater was renamed "Charles Ludlam Lane" in his honor.

In 2009, Ludlam was inducted posthumously into the American Theater Hall of Fame.

After his death, Walter Ego, the dummy from Ludlam's 1978 play The Ventriloquist's Wife (designed and built by actor and puppet-maker Alan Semok), was donated to the Vent Haven Museum in Fort Mitchell, Kentucky, where it remains on exhibit.

In his 1987 obituary of Ludlam in Christopher Street, Andrew Holleran wrote,

It would be pointless to subject Ludlam to a dissertation—he was too funny—and yet no one was more grounded in theater's ancient roots than he; like a child running through the contents of his bedroom closet, putting on fake noses, mustaches, pulling out toy airplanes, little plastic gladiators, goldfish bowls, Cleopatra wigs, he always gave the impression of having assembled the particular play from a magic storeroom in which he kept, like some obsessed bag lady, every prop and character that two thousand years of Western History had washed up on the shores of a childhood on Long Island....Drag is a profound joke—the fundamental homosexual joke, no doubt: the Woman at Bay, Wounded but Triumphant, lascivious or frigid, repressed or mad, rings all the notes, high and low....Charles Ludlam was the greatest drag I've ever seen. It ceased to be drag, in fact, or acting: it was art.

Garth Greenwell calls Holleran's essay on Ludlam "the most concise and profound discussion of camp aesthetics I know."

== Selected works ==
=== Plays (as playwright) ===
- Big Hotel (1967)
- Conquest of the Universe, or When Queens Collide (1968)
- Turds in Hell (1969) adaptation of Satyricon
- The Grand Tarot (1969)
- Bluebeard (1970) adaptation of H. G. Wells's The Island of Dr Moreau
- Eunuchs of the Forbidden City (1971)
- Corn (1972)
- Camille (1973)
- Hot Ice (1974)
- Stage Blood (1975) a comedy in which the events and actors in a theater company that is playing Hamlet wildly mirror events and characters in Hamlet
- Tabu Tableaux (1975)
- Caprice (1976)
- Jack and the Beanstalk (1976)
- Der Ring Gott Farblonjet (1977) adaptation of The Ring Cycle
- The Ventriloquist's Wife (1978)
- Utopia, Incorporated (1979)
- The Enchanted Pig (1979)
- Elephant Woman (1979)
- A Christmas Carol (1979)
- Reverse Psychology (1980)
- Love's Tangled Web (1981)
- Secret Lives of the Sexists (1982)
- Exquisite Torture (1982)
- Le Bourgeois Avant-Garde (1983) adaptation of Molière's Le Bourgeois Gentilhomme
- Galas (1983) inspired by the life of Maria Callas
- The Mystery of Irma Vep (1984)
- How to Write a Play (1984)
- Salammbo (1985) adaptation of Gustave Flaubert's Salammbo (novel)
- The Artificial Jungle (1986)

=== Puppet shows ===
- Professor Bedlam's Educational Punch and Judy Show
- Anti-Galaxie Nebulae

=== Plays (as actor) ===
- The Life of Lady Godiva by Ronald Tavel (as Peeping Tom)
- Indira Gandhi's Daring Device by Ronald Tavel (as Kamaraj)
- Screen Test by Ronald Tavel (as Norma Desmond)
- Hedda Gabler by Henrik Ibsen (as Hedda Gabler), American Ibsen Theatre, Pittsburgh, 1984; directed by Mel Shapiro (dramaturg: Micheael X. Zelenak; assistant to the director: Hafiz Karmali)

=== Plays (as director) ===
- Whores of Babylon by Bill Vehr (1968)
- The English Cat by Hans Werner Henze (American premiere, Santa Fe Opera, 1985)
- Die Fledermaus by Johann Strauss II (Santa Fe Opera)

=== Films (as actor) ===
- The Life, Death and Assumption of Lupe Velez (1966) by José Rodriguez-Soltero (as The Lesbian)
- Underground and Emigrants (1976)
- Reel 6: Charles Ludlam's Grand Tarot (1970)
- Impostors (1979)
- Museum of Wax (1987)
- Pink Narcissus (1971)
- Doomed Love (1983)
- The Big Easy (1987)
- Forever, Lulu (1987)
- She Must Be Seeing Things (1988)

=== Television (as actor) ===
- Miami Vice
- Tales from the Darkside
- Oh Madeline
