= Theatre of the Ridiculous =

Theatrical genre

Theatre of the Ridiculous is a theatrical genre that began in New York City in the 1960s.

== Beginnings of the genre ==
The phrase "Theatre of the Ridiculous" was created in 1965 by actor and director Ronald Tavel to describe his own work, which was later recognized as the beginning of the genre. Referencing Martin Esslin's concept of a Theatre of the Absurd, Tavel promoted the first Ridiculous performances with the manifesto: "We have passed beyond the absurd: our position is absolutely preposterous." Theatre of the Ridiculous broke from the dominant trends in theater of naturalistic acting and realistic settings. The genre employed a broad acting style, often with surrealistic stage settings and props, and frequently made a conscious effort to be shocking or disturbing.

Ridiculous theatre brought elements of queer and/or camp performance to experimental theater. Cross-gender casting was common, as was casting non-professional actors, such as drag queens or other "street stars". Ridiculous plays were often parodies or adaptations of popular culture, used as vehicles for social commentary and/or humour. Improvisation played a significant role in the often chaotic Ridiculous productions, with the script used as a starting point.

Prominent works from the genre include:

- Camille
- The Life of Lady Godiva
- Conquest of the Universe
- When Queens Collide
- The Mystery of Irma Vep

== The Play-House of the Ridiculous and the Ridiculous Theatrical Company ==
The Play-House of the Ridiculous was a theatrical ensemble founded by John Vaccaro in the mid-1960s. The ensemble first produced works written by Tavel, beginning with Shower and The Life of Juanita Castro, which were originally intended as films to be produced at Andy Warhol's Factory. When these works were rejected by The Factory, Tavel decided to have them performed as plays, producing them together on a double-bill called "Theater of the Ridiculous".

The Life of Lady Godiva, written by Ronald Tavel and directed by Vaccaro in 1966, was the first official production of the Play-House of the Ridiculous. Charles Ludlam, who would become a major figure in the "Ridiculous" genre, acted in the play as a last-minute replacement.

Vaccaro then directed a play written by Ludlam, Big Hotel, which opened in an East Village loft in February 1967. David Kaufman, discussing Big Hotel, has said: "Various features of Ludlam's 28 subsequent works figure prominently in his first play. His predilection for collage - folding in cultural references, both popular and obscure - is especially pronounced. Characters include Mata Hari, Trilby, Svengali and Santa Claus, and Ludlam acknowledged no fewer than 40 sources for Big Hotel - everything from ads and Hollywood films to literary classics, textbooks and essays."

Ludlam wrote a second play for the Play-House, Conquest of the Universe, but during rehearsals Ludlam and Vaccaro had a disagreement. Ludlam left to form his own company, which he named The Ridiculous Theatrical Group, and took many of the Play-House actors with him. Vaccaro held the rights to Conquest of the Universe, and was able to perform it first, delaying the production of Ludlam's competing version (called When Queens Collide) for several months.

Vaccaro's Conquest of the Universe was performed at the Bouwerie Lane Theatre with many members of Andy Warhol's Factory, including Mary Woronov, Taylor Mead, Ondine, and Ultra Violet. The Play-House of the Ridiculous was a resident company at La MaMa Experimental Theatre Club in the East Village of Manhattan.

=== Gay themes ===
Vaccaro's Play-House of the Ridiculous and Ludlam's Ridiculous Theatrical Company had similar approaches to gay themes. Both ensembles used cross-gender casting, often recruiting drag queens as actors.

One perspective of the Play-House of the Ridiculous is that they were reluctant to address queer themes. According to Ludlam, the Ridiculous Theatrical Company's productions were more daring: "I felt John [Vaccaro] was too conservative. He didn't want homosexuality or nudity onstage because he was afraid of being arrested. I wanted to commit an outrage. For me, nothing was too far out." Another perspective is that Ludlam's productions were too close to conventional comedy, while Vacarro's work was more challenging, emphasizing social commentary. Leee Black Childers was quoted in Legs McNeil's 1997 Please Kill Me:

In my opinion, John Vaccaro was more important than Charles Ludlam, because Ludlam followed theatrical traditions and used a lot of drag. People felt very comfortable with Charles Ludlam. Everyone's attitude going to see Charles's plays was that they were going to see a really funny, irreverent, slapstick drag show. They never felt embarrassed.

But John Vaccaro was way past that. Way, way past that. John Vaccaro was dangerous. John Vaccaro could be very embarrassing on many levels. He used thalidomide babies and Siamese triplets joined together at the asshole. One actor had this huge papier-mache prop of a big cock coming out of his shorts, down to his knees. He also couldn't control his bowel movements, so shit was dripping down his legs the whole time and everyone loved it. People loved this kind of visually confrontational theater.

Vaccaro and Ludlam had different attitudes toward gayness and the theater. Ludlam talked about how the theatre had always been a refuge for gay people, and made clear that gay themes were important to his work. For Vaccaro, gayness was one theme among many that he used. Vaccaro made a distinction between theater people and gay people using the theater for camp and/or drag performances.

Ludlam did object to being identified solely as a gay, female impersonator who produced works that were merely camp. Morris Meyer commented on Ludlam's ambivalence when discussing an interview he conducted with Ludlam: "During a subsequent run of Camille in 1974, he argued emphatically two seemingly contradictory positions for his production. He maintained that his rendering of Camille is not an expression of homosexuality and, at the same time, that it represents a form of coming out."

Cross-gender performance was central to Ludlam's work. Ludlam discussed his role as the Emerald Empress in Bill Vehr's Whores of Babylon:

Bill wrote this line in Whores of Babylon in which his character said to mine, "How well I understand that struggle in you between the warrior artist and the woman" – this was a wonderful self-revelation – and my line, he wrote, was "The woman? Don't you know there are a thousand women in me and I'm tormented by each one in turn?

== Cultural influence ==
Theatre of the Ridiculous had a strong influence on 1970s culture. Elements of the genre can be seen in glam rock, disco, and in the Rocky Horror Picture Show. The genre has also influenced more mainstream productions, such as Bat Boy, Urinetown, and Reefer Madness. Scott Miller cites the Play-House of the Ridiculous as a key source of "a performance style that only recently is becoming mainstream, a style described by Bat Boy's original director and co-author Keythe Farley as 'the height of expression, the depth of sincerity,' a kind of outrageous but utterly truthful acting." Taylor Mac also credits Theatre of the Ridiculous as one of his professional influences.

Concerning 1970s fashion, Childers has said:

... John Vaccaro used tons of glitter, that was his trademark. Everyone wore glitter. The whole cast was always covered in glitter.

People had been wearing glitter for a long time and the drag queens were wearing it on the street, but I think "glitter' really took off when John Vaccaro went shopping for costume material and he came across this little place in Chinatown that was having a big clearance sale on their glitter. He bought it all – giant shopping-bag-size bags of glitter in all colors.

John brought it back to the theater and encouraged everyone to use as much of it as they possibly could, anywhere they could possibly put it. Of course their faces were covered with glitter, their hair was full of glitter, the actors who played the Moon Reindeer had their entire bodies covered in green glitter. Baby Betty, who was playing a thalidomide baby, had glitter coming out of her pussy – so it was because of John Vaccaro that glitter became synonymous with outrageousness.

The Play-House of the Ridiculous connected Warhol's Factory with the punk culture developing in the mid-1970s. Patti Smith performed in a play written by Jackie Curtis called Femme Fatale. According to Jayne County, also known as Wayne County: "Actually, it was [a] simulation of shooting up speed while shrieking, 'Brian Jones is dead!' That was Patti Smith's big moment on the New York underground stage."

Lou Reed has attributed the origins of Rocky Horror and its cult following to the Theatre of the Ridiculous.

== John Vaccaro ==
Ludlam wrote of Vaccaro: "John has great instinct and is a brilliant actor. He gave me freedom. He allowed me to flip out all I wanted onstage. He never felt that I was too pasty, corny, mannered, campy. He let me do anything I wanted."

Vaccaro was known for being a challenge to work with, as when he kicked Jackie Curtis out of a production of a play that Curtis had written (Heaven Grand In Amber Orbit). Ludlam also wrote: "He is very primitive and very difficult for most actors to work with, because he's sort of savage. He gets you into doing things by rote. He criticizes ideas without giving any suggestions for improvments [sic], and then makes you do it over and over again. It's psychological torture." Similarly, Childers has said: "John Vaccaro was a very difficult man to work with because he used anger to draw a performance out of a person."

John Vaccaro died on August 7, 2016, at the age of 86.
