= Jay Johnson (model) =

American business executive and model

- Born: December 30, 1948 (age 77); Alexandria, Minnesota, U.S.
- Occupations: Model, business executive
- Spouse: Tom Cashin
- Relatives: Jed Johnson (twin brother)

Jay Johnson (born December 30, 1948) is an American business executive and former model. Shortly after arriving in New York City in 1968 with his twin brother, Jed Johnson, Johnson became part of Pop artist Andy Warhol's inner circle at the Factory, where he emerged as one of Warhol's superstars and appeared in the film L'Amour (1972). Johnson built a successful career as a fashion model and was a muse to photographer Robert Mapplethorpe. Following his brother's death in 1996, he became president of Jed Johnson Associates Inc. and later co-founded the textile firm Jed Johnson Home in 2005. He also briefly operated the trendy restaurant Fressen in New York's Meatpacking District.

== Life and career ==
=== Early life and education ===
Jay Johnson was born in Alexandria, Minnesota on December 30, 1948. He was the third of six children, born 15 minutes before his fraternal twin brother Jed Johnson. They had two older brothers, Craig and Larry, and two younger sisters, Nancy and Susan. His family moved to Scottsdale, Arizona for eight months, when he was 10 years old before settling in Fair Oaks, California. Johnson and future Playboy model Barbi Benton were junior high school sweethearts. After graduating from Bella Vista High School in 1967, he briefly attended Sacramento State College.

=== Andy Warhol and the Factory ===
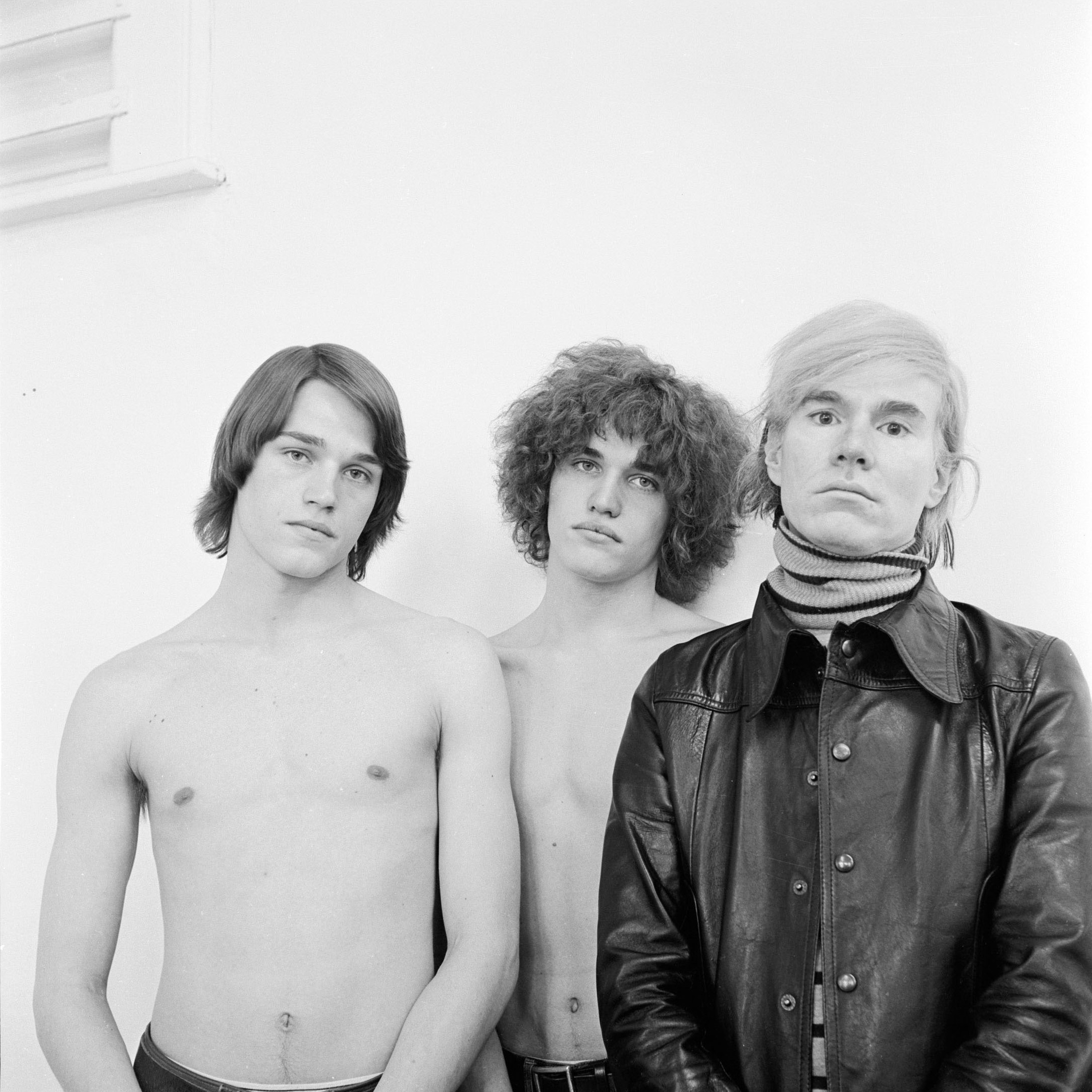
Johnson (center), his twin brother Jed Johnson, and Andy Warhol photographed by Cecil Beaton at the Factory, 1969

Johnson and his twin brother Jed left Sacramento, California, in early 1968 with the intention of traveling to Montreal, Canada. However, the immigration authorities near Buffalo, New York threw them off the train because they believed they were draft dodgers, so they took a Greyhound bus to New York City instead. They found an apartment in the East Village, Manhattan, through a heroin addict, got robbed, and lost all their money. When they went to collect money their mother had sent them through Western Union, they were offered a job as messengers. Three days later, Jed delivered a telegram to Pop artist Andy Warhol's studio, the Factory, and was offered a job on the spot as a janitor by director Paul Morrissey. Morrissey also promised the brothers parts in the film Lonesome Cowboys (1968), but those plans fell through. Warhol helped them move into an apartment in a safer neighborhood, and they were quickly assimilated into his entourage. Jed would become Warhol's live-in boyfriend, edit his films, and eventually direct the film Bad (1977).

While Warhol was hospitalized following a near-fatal shooting in June 1968, Johnson appeared with his brother as a hippie partygoer in John Schlesinger's Midnight Cowboy (1969). Warhol subsequently helped him secure positions at the Alexander Iolas Gallery and at several nightclubs, including Arthur.

Around this time, Johnson dated Jane Forth, whom he introduced to Warhol; she later became a Warhol superstar. Johnson recalled that when he and Jed first arrived in New York City they "had not yet recognized that they were gay." The Factory photographer Billy Name helped them come to terms with their sexuality. Reflecting on the 50th anniversary of the Stonewall riots in 2019, Johnson stated:

The Stonewall was the first gay bar that I ever went into. … I started working in a club Uptown called Arthur's, and it was managed by Mickey Dean [sic]—a homosexual who tried to rape me—who later became the husband of Judy Garland. He was an awful person and provided Judy with barbiturates and alcohol until she died, which was only a few days before the Stonewall riots. So when the police raided the Stonewall, people were grieving Judy's death—and the raid was the straw that broke the camel’s back. … By the time of the riots, I was an out homosexual and enjoying the fruits of the city.

Johnson pursued professional modeling while assisting with projects at the Factory. Johnson posed for renowned photographers such as Cecil Beaton, Richard Avedon, Jack Mitchell, and Francesco Scavullo. Johnson appeared alongside Warhol and fellow superstar Candy Darling in the March 1, 1970 issue of Vogue magazine. He was also featured in a photo spread with his brother Jed in the December 1970 edition of After Dark magazine.

=== Modeling and acting career ===
While modeling in Paris, Johnson lived in a hotel with Corey Tippin, Patti D'Arbanville, and Donna Jordan, all of whom appeared in Warhol's L'Amour (1972), filmed in Paris in the fall of 1970. The following year, he appeared in the Off-off-Broadway musical Vain Victory: The Vicissitudes of the Damned, written by fellow Warhol superstar Jackie Curtis, staged at the La Mama Experimental Theatre Club and the WPA Theatre in New York City.

In the early 1970s, Johnson was part of fashion illustrator Antonio Lopez's circle and worked as an assistant to designer Giorgio di Sant'Angelo. He also modeled for photographer Robert Mapplethorpe's jewelry. Mapplethorpe created the painting Untitled (Baby/Jay Johnson) (1972) from a Polaroid of Johnson, which he later enlarged and incorporated into his assemblage Jay Kiss (1973).

In 1973, Johnson began a relationship with Tom Cashin, a 19-year-old model he met in Paris. After returning to New York, Johnson was featured in the January 1975 edition of Warhol's Interview magazine in the profile "The Return of Jay" and was signed to the Zoli modeling agency. He and Cashin also helped with repairs at Warhol's Montauk estate, Eothen.

Johnson was feistier than his shy twin and considered the "bad boy" of the duo. He drank heavily and battled cocaine addiction. Johnson's twin brother, Jed, and Cashin intervened, sending him to a rehabilitation center in Minnesota for three months. By 1978, Jed had started a decorating business, and Johnson worked as his bookkeeper.

Johnson studied macrobiotics under Michio Kushi, and he and Jed later planned to open a macrobiotic restaurant. The brothers were featured together in the June 1986 issue of Vanity Fair. Johnson and Cashin worked as waiters while pursuing modeling careers in the 1980s. Cashin was also an Irish step dancer and appeared in The Best Little Whorehouse in Texas during its Broadway run.

=== Career as a business executive and restaurateur ===
In July 1996, his brother Jed was killed as a passenger aboard TWA Flight 800 when the plane exploded off the coast of Long Island, New York. Johnson inherited his collection of Warhol paintings and took over his interior design firm, Jed Johnson & Associates. In 1997, he appointed Jed's protégé, Arthur Dunnam, as design director, and the company was renamed Jed Johnson Associates. After Johnson retired in 2017, the firm was rebranded as Arthur Dunnam for Jed Johnson Studio, and in 2024 it became Dunnam Zerbini Design.

Johnson later completed a project begun by his brother with textile merchant Mona Perlhagen, opening the fabric showroom Chelsea Editions in fall 1996, which specialized in high-quality, historically accurate embroidered textiles for the design trade. He subsequently sold his share in the business to launch Jed Johnson Home in November 2005, offering luxury textiles for interior design clients worldwide. Cashin serves as co-director, and together they have continued to develop fabrics and furniture for the collection. The line is now exclusively represented in the showrooms of Holland & Sherry in the United States and England, and has been used by Michael S. Smith in designing the White House Residence during the Barack Obama administration.

In June 1999, Johnson and Ron Teitelbaum, who owned Blanche's Organic Cafes, opened the restaurant Fressen at 421 West 13th Street in Manhattan's Meatpacking District. Named after the Yiddish word roughly meaning to eat ravenously, the restaurant was praised by critics for its organic cuisine and stylish interior, designed by Laura Kirar of Jed Johnson Associates. It closed in December 2001.

=== Marriage and later years ===
Johnson married Cashin after same-sex marriage became legalized in New York. They reside in New York City and Brookhaven, New York. The couple was featured with their Abyssinian cat, Dylan, in the book Men With Cats: Intimate Portraits of Feline Friendship (2016) by David Williams.

In 2022, Johnson appeared in the Netflix docuseries The Andy Warhol Diaries.
