= Olga Maynard =

Brazilian-born American writer and educator

- Olga Maynard in 1943
- Born: Myriol Olga Morton-Gittens; January 16, 1913; Belém, Brazil
- Died: December 26, 1994 (aged 81); Irvine, California
- Occupations: Dance Writer, Historian, Educator
- Partner(s): Rafael du Coudray (divorced); Leonard Wibberley (divorced); Elliot Russell Maynard

Olga Maynard (January 16, 1913 – December 26, 1994) was a Brazilian-born American writer and educator on theater arts, author of articles and monographs on dance and dancers. Her published books are on ballet, modern dance, opera and the integration of performing arts into general education. She lectured widely and was active internationally as dance historian and liberal arts educator—also as critic, jurist and consultant. She published hundreds of articles, reviewing most of the leading figures and institutions of the ‘dance boom’ of the mid 1960s into the 1980s, interacting with leading figures and institutions in the arts, notably dance.

== Early years ==
Born in Belém do Pará in the Amazonia part of Brazil, as Myriol Olga Gittens, eldest of six children of Frederick Morton Gittens and Jeanne Arsenne Borde. The family resettled to their home in Port of Spain, Trinidad, of which an ancestor, Pierre-Gustave-Louis Borde, had published a history in 1876. Precociously active in the burgeoning literary and arts scene of that city during the 1930s and 1940s, she published journalism, poetry, fiction and criticism in periodicals, notably the Trinidad Guardian newspaper. She married at nineteen and had four sons with two husbands, including future novelist Leonard Wibberley. She joined Wibberley in New York City in 1943.

== Career ==
In New York City she began ballet research as well as a long career as an educational reformer, particularly with regard to integration of theater arts into existing systems. In 1947 she left New York and Wibberley, to settle in Yuma, Arizona with E. R. Maynard, with whom she had two more children. Absorbed by domestic matters in confining economic and cultural circumstances, she drew support and inspiration from friendship with dance teacher Merlyn Legge. Her family moved to La Mesa, California in 1955, where she wrote reviews and feature articles for The San Diego Union, and completed The Ballet Companion. Its success marked the beginning of her publishing career.

Following its delayed starting point, Olga Maynard's career soon had its turning point. By the time of that first book publication (1957), she was already well into research for her major work, The American Ballet, which had been in the planning since her arrival in New York. Rather than a “how to look and how to listen” aid for beginners, or a collection of critical essays, this constituted a bold attempt to conceptualize all dance in America, from its native and colonial roots to its present, for its practitioners and its audience, and so to encourage its future. Of it Ted Shawn wrote that “what has lain, unformed in words, in the dance artists’ consciousness is made explicit here”, yet it was written from the point of view of an audience that she argued was distinctively American. With Agnes de Mille recommending the first book by an unknown as "a key, a talisman" for young dancers, and Shawn hailing the second as "an ideal catalytic agent between stage and audience", she was well-positioned for the beginning of the 'dance boom'.

Olga Maynard gained increasing university experience as guest lecturer at California State University Long Beach, the University of Utah, the University of Oregon and the University of California, Irvine. Although she continued to publish locally, by the mid-1960s, as part of a cultural growth of interest in dance, she had taken a national position as a writer on dance and theater arts, developing close friendships with such dance luminaries as Shawn and Maria Tallchief. Tallchief was the subject of the follow-up book, which was a particular “study of an American ballerina in her setting.” The next development of The American Ballet was its extension into her best selling book, American Modern Dancers. That book has a subtitle, “The Pioneers”, implying a sequel—perhaps as sketched in a “family tree” diagram at the end. But despite Maynard's associations with Helen Tamiris, Katherine Litz, Pauline Koner, and Bruce King, such a 'sequel' would have to be conjectured from her subsequent articles on them, Merce Cunningham, Carolyn Brown and others, together with her final book, on Judith Jamison and Alvin Ailey. Her next two (overlapping) book projects brought her work back to basic issues of education and "how to look and how to listen".

The return to educational concerns was consolidated by a 1969 invitation to join the faculty of Eugene Loring's new, academically unique, professional Dance Department in Dean Clayton Garrison's School of Fine Arts, at University of California, Irvine (joined four years later by Antony Tudor). Garrison's and Loring's programs explicitly encouraged continuing contact with working artists, in dance and visual arts: an unusual arrangement, luckily ideal for balancing two of Maynard's vocations, and she settled permanently in Irvine, California. Able to put her ideas about humanities education into institutional setting, at UCI Maynard helped develop and taught both undergraduate and graduate courses in the MFA program, which she had originally written. Her courses included dance history and aesthetics, elements of performing, opera, criticism, research and bibliography. She conducted graduate seminars as well as large lecture courses, courses for UC Berkeley Extension and lectured at UC Berkeley. She continued in this post, as Full Professor, also serving on the University Senate, executive committee for community education, and Chancellor's advisory committee on minority affairs, until 1989.

Given the School's professional policies, in this period Professor Maynard wrote articles and shorter pieces, and made frequent trips within North America and abroad (significantly including the Soviet bloc and Cuba) as interviewer, dance jurist, critic, conference participant, researcher and lecturer. She studied tsarist repertoire with Peter Gusev, director of the Leningrad Choreographic Institute, and observed and commented upon not only international theater dance but also—returning to her roots--'world dance' of ethnic or folk derivations. Among choreographers with whom she worked closely on issues of history, period and style were George Balanchine, Robert Joffrey, Gerald Arpino, John Neumeier, Norbert Vesak. Her “lauds and laurels” at UCI include those for professional achievement (1981) and distinguished teaching (1987). For her support of racial minorities in the arts, she received a Rainbow award, also an award from the English-Speaking Union for promoting international understanding. The gala for her postponed UCI retirement was to be attended by leading choreographers and dancers.

University activity corresponded with a decline in Olga Maynard's book production. Having published six books in eleven years, she published just one more in her last twenty-six. This was to an extent offset by her shorter publications during the university years, mostly in what had become the dance periodical of record, Dance Magazine. Although she had written more than twenty earlier pieces for that journal, beginning in 1970, when William Como assumed the post of Editor-in-Chief of Dance, she averaged one publication a month, for six years. Some of these articles—particularly those in Como's and Richard Philp's "Portfolio" series, printed on heavy stock paper, with the art design of Herbert Migdoll—amount to research monographs, still advertised independently on websites. This was at a time in which the developing dance world constituted something like a 'world', with not only a spatial span but a sense of past and future, because, while journalism kept it before the general public, Dance helped to coordinate it internally.

The death of her husband in 1984, along with changes in the dance and university scenes, marked Olga Maynard's relative withdrawal from public appearance and publication. The personal loss was chief among a series over seven years, from Loring and Balanchine through Como and Robert Joffrey, and the onset of the AIDS epidemic, which struck the dance world with special vehemence.

== Dance scholar and critic ==
Testimony from the dance world shows that Olga Maynard was recognized as a literary artist among them, who devoted her talents to giving them voice. She gave many lectures and demonstrations with dance companies, notably with the Robert Joffrey Ballet, and her counsel was particularly helpful to the two major ballet companies in Canada, The National Ballet of Canada and The Royal Winnipeg Ballet, as well as to individual performers such as Rudolph Nureyev. Her writing, lectures and activities celebrated dancing more than ‘the dance’, and, although she considered herself an aesthetician, she had no interest in critical writing for its own sake, or in theories about it.

Maynard's is also a rare case, in any art form, of a leading contemporary critic who is also an active field-research historian of the art, working through library sources, interviews and personal papers of contemporaries. This has two implications. First, unlike most American critics of the time, she had cultural knowledge and affinity regarding European and Russian history, including all their arts, and travelled extensively. Second, aside from her interpretations and evaluations, her publications are characterized by precision, fact-checked names and dates, which alone give them permanent value, notably regarding events and careers. Few arts critics of that period also taught graduate courses on bibliography. Her writings—particularly her books—are again unusual to art criticism by their roots in education, academically from children through studio and graduate work, within a dance community that she helped to inform and to maintain, and also for general audiences that support the arts.

A final feature, understandably overlooked, is that Olga Maynard was a fusion not only of disparate features, but of powerful ones—including features that American society, with its tendency to look east and west for its influences, neglects: South America. While she published mostly on Western concert dance, Olga Maynard's early interests in Afro-Caribbean and other dances of the West Indies and Brazil were formative: her analytic discernment linked with a memory of sensuous particularity, shaping her words and phrases.

All period and regional styles are embraced by her remark, “Dancing is a serious, an honorable, a noble profession.”

== Written works and lectures ==
- The New York Public Library for the Performing Arts searchable indices list well over a hundred of Maynard's writings, mainly articles, along with voice and video recordings:

- A collection of Olga Maynard's papers is in the University of California, Irvine Library Dance and Performing Arts Collection, where her dance photograph collection also has special place.

These may include souvenir programs that she wrote for such companies as the National Ballet of Canada and Les Grandes Ballets Canadièns.

=== Books and separately available writings (all illus.) ===
- The Ballet Companion: An Illustrated How to Look and How to Listen Guide to Four of the Most Popular Ballets. Philadelphia: Macrae Smith, 1957.
- The American Ballet. With a foreword by Ted Shawn. Philadelphia: Macrae Smith Co., 1959.
- Bird of Fire: The Story of Maria Tallchief. New York: Dodd, Mead, 1961.
- American Modern Dancers: The Pioneers; An introduction to modern dance through the biographical studies of the first creative dancers of that art. New York: Little, Brown, 1965.
- Enjoying Opera: A Book for the New Opera Goer. New York: Scribner's, 1966.
- Children and Dance and Music. New York: Scribner's, 1968.
- 'Les Sylphides', Dance Magazine Portfolio. New York, 1971.
- 'Balanchine and Stravinsky: The Glorious Undertaking', Dance Magazine Portfolio, 1972.
- ‘The Sleeping Beauty (an historical survey from Perrault to Nureyev's version for National Ballet of Canada)’. Dance Magazine (December 1972): 43-66.
- 'Nureyev: the Man and the Myth', 100 pp (illus.), 28 cm. William Como, ed.; Herbert Migdoll, designer. Danad Pub. Co, 1973.
- Judith Jamison: Aspects of a Dancer. Garden City, N.Y.: Doubleday, 1982.

=== Critics' choices: shorter pieces ===
- ‘ABT on Tour with a King, Two Queens and Four Aces’. Dance Magazine (May 1971): 44-6.
- ‘Lincoln Center New York City: The Night They Danced “Giselle”’. Dance Magazine (October 1974)
