= Jane Forth =

American actress and model

Jane Forth (born March 4, 1953) is an American actress, model, and make-up artist. She is best known as one of Andy Warhol's Superstars, notably appearing in his films—Trash (1970), Women in Revolt (1971), and L'Amour (1972)—and social milieu while also working as a fashion model. Forth was one of "Antonio's Girls," serving as a muse to fashion illustrator Antonio Lopez, and was a visible figure in the early-1970s New York art and fashion scenes.

== Life and career ==
=== Early life and education ===
Jane Forth was born on March 4, 1953, in Michigan, the third of four children. Her parents were separated when she was young, and her father was an executive with Renault, Inc. in New York. She attended St. Joan of Arc Catholic School in St. Clair Shores, Michigan, before she moved to New York City in 1968. Forth plead to her father—who was living in New York at the time—to bring her there; as a result, he rented an apartment at Kips Bay Plaza in Kips Bay, Manhattan for Jane and her mother, Rhea Forth, a data control analyst for John P. Maguire Company.

At the time of the move, Forth's siblings were living separately: her older sister Diane Forth, a makeup artist for Merle Cosmetics, remained in Mt. Clemens, Michigan; her brother Robert was attending college in Kalamazoo, Michigan; and her younger sister Beverly was enrolled at a private boarding school in upstate New York.

After briefly enrolling in a public junior high school, Forth attended Quintano's School for Young Professionals in Manhattan but left school at age 15 to work as a salesgirl. Reflecting on that decision, she later said she did not want "to be stuck in an office as a secretary or something like that someday." She supported herself through a series of jobs, including boutique sales, babysitting, and work in art galleries.

While operating the Green Branch Antique Store on First Avenue, Forth was rapidly launched into the worlds of fashion and film.

=== Warhol years and modeling career ===
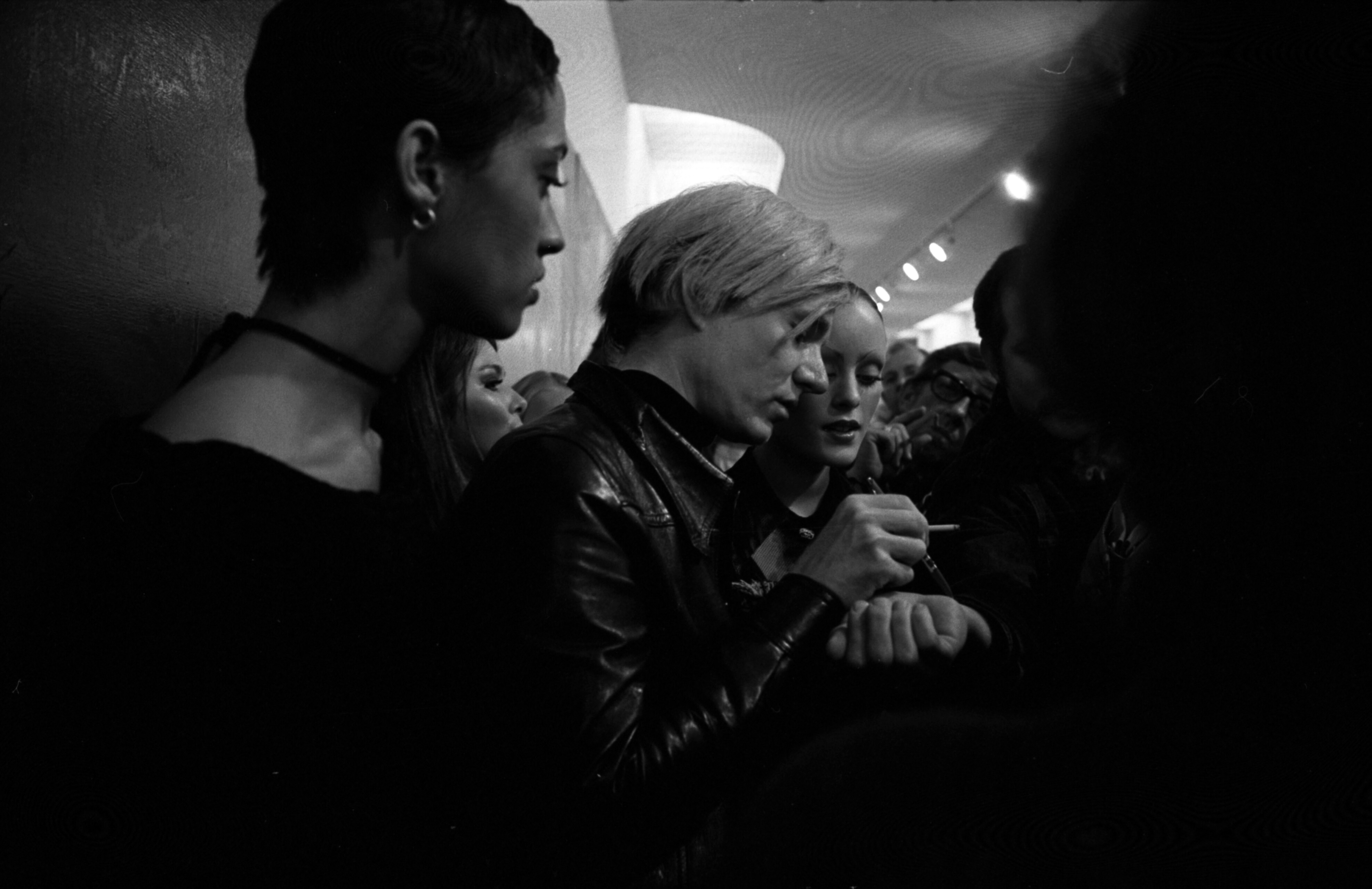
Forth with Warhol and Carole LaBrie at the Pasadena Art Museum, 1970

During this period, Forth was introduced to artist and filmmaker Andy Warhol at his home through her first boyfriend, Jay Johnson, the twin brother of Warhol's longtime partner Jed Johnson. She recalled expecting Warhol "to be tall and dark and important-looking," but instead finding him "sitting on his bed, white-haired and pale with his sunglasses on." Later, the two became close friends, and Forth became a receptionist at Warhol's studio, the Factory, in 1969. "I like him a lot. Maybe he's a father image to me… If it wasn't for him, none of the things that have happened to me would have happened," Forth told the Detroit Free Press in 1970.

Taken with her striking appearance, Warhol invited Forth to appear in Trash (1970) with Joe Dallesandro and Holly Woodlawn. Despite her youth, Forth shined in the production and became Warhol's breakthrough star. Warhol called her "the most exciting thing to come his way since Viva!"

Forth's unique look—involving shaved eyebrows, Wesson-oiled hair, pale skin, red cheeks, and bold lips—was proclaimed the "New Now Face" in 1970. Her look was inspired by classic Hollywood heroines, such as Myrna Loy and Claudette Colbert, she styled herself in thrifted clothing from the 1930s and '40s. Despite the praise she received for her look, Forth had a difficult time signing to a modeling agency due to her short stature.

She became a protégé of fashion editor Diana Vreeland, who helped promote her. Forth posed for Antonio Lopez’s fashion illustrations in the New York Times, Diane von Furstenberg, and was photographed for Vogue and Harper’s Bazaar.

Forth was 16 years old when Jack Mitchell photographed her for a nude four-page photo spread for the April 1970 cover of After Dark magazine. In the article, Forth revealed that she was called to read for a part in the film The Telephone Book (1971).

Forth appeared on The Dick Cavett Show alongside boxer Sugar Ray Robinson and psychiatrist Thomas S. Szasz in May 1970.

Forth was featured in a fashion layout in the July 1970 edition of Life magazine. The youth and arrogance of then-teenaged Forth shows through her 1970 statement to Life: "When I'm home I'm yelling at my mother to iron my clothes, and when I'm out, I'm standing around yawning at all these fancy people." She declared in the same interview that she bought dime-store make up and each of her "dress-up" faces only cost twenty-five cents, with her thrifted vintage dresses averaging a price of $12.50.

Forth appeared in the Factory film Women In Revolt (1971) and she had a leading role in Warhol's next production, L'Amour (1972), alongside Warhol superstar Donna Jordan. L'Amour was filmed in Paris in the fall of 1970.

In February 1971, Forth accompanied Warhol to Europe to attend the opening of his retrospective at the Tate Gallery. They then embarked on a one-week promotional tour of Germany for the film Trash.

After Forth became pregnant in 1971, she retired from acting and modeling.

=== Later years ===
In the late 1970s, Forth embarked on a career as a make-up artist. She taught herself, attended night classes, and joined the union. She was hired to do the make-up of people photographed by Warhol for their silkscreen portrait at the Factory, including singer Neil Sedaka and fashion designer Gianni Versace. She also worked in makeup and special effects in the film industry. After becoming pregnant again in her thirties, she relocated to Los Angeles and made the decision to give up her work in beauty and become a stay-at-home mother.

== Personal life ==
Forth had a son with fellow Warhol superstar Eric Emerson in 1971. While raising her son as a single mother, she eventually met cinematographer Oliver Wood. They were married for 22 years and had two daughters.

== Filmography ==
Year	Title	Role	Notes
1970	Trash	Jane	
1971	Women in Revolt	Jane	
1972	L'Amour	Jane	
1977	Andy Warhol's Bad	Screaming Passer-by	
1981	CBS Afternoon Playhouse		Make-up artist
1981	The Prowler		Make-up artist
1983	Cold Feet		Make-up artist
