= Max Delys =

French actor (1951–1993)

- Delys in L'Amour
- Born: July 11, 1951; Cannes, France
- Died: May 31, 1993 (aged 41); Cannes, France
- Occupations: Actor; model

Max Delys (July 11, 1951 – May 31, 1993) was a French actor and model. Born in Cannes, Delys was a competitive swimmer in his youth. He began his acting career in Rome before he became associated with Pop artist Andy Warhol's Factory scene. As a Warhol superstar, Delys starred in L'Amour (1972). He also modeled for fashion designers including Karl Lagerfeld and Pierre Cardin and appeared in the 1971 Coca-Cola "Hilltop" television commercial. He later became known for appearing in Italian fotoromanzi.

== Early life ==
Max Delys was born in Cannes, France, on July 11, 1951. His father Gabriel Delys, was a pastry chef who later became a physician, and his mother had been elected "Queen of Cannes." He had two sisters, Myriam and Michèle.

In his youth, his father enrolled him in the swimming program of the Association Sportive de Cannes (ASC), chaired by René Schœbel, who also directed Martinez beach. Delys quickly emerged as one of the leading swimmers in his age category on the Côte d'Azur and, at age 15, finished runner-up in the 100-meter freestyle at the French National Championships.

== Career ==
In 1968, at age 17, Delys moved to the Trastevere neighborhood of Rome, Italy, with his girlfriend, Dominique Darel. Darel worked at the film studio Cinecittà. Delys landed his first film role in The Lady of Monza (1969), directed by Eriprando Visconti, followed by a role in Gangster's Law (1969), directed by Siro Marcellini.

Delys was approached by filmmaker Paul Morrissey, who introduced him to Pop artist Andy Warhol. As a Warhol superstar, Delys starred in the film L'Amour (1972), which was filmed in Paris in 1970. His performance received positive reviews, with Women's Wear Daily describing him as a "promising discovery" and After Dark calling him "the film's real find."

In 1971, Delys appeared in the Coca-Cola "Hilltop" television commercial. Alongside his acting career, he worked as a model for fashion designers Karl Lagerfeld, Pierre Cardin, and Carlo Palazzi. He also posed for photographer Jack Mitchell. The January 1972 issue of Mademoiselle compared Delys to actor Alain Delon.

In 1973, Warhol took nude Polaroid photographs of Delys and his girlfriend Dominique Darel for a pictorial published in the August 1974 issue of Playboy magazine. Darel appeared in Blood for Dracula (1974) directed by Morrissey.

Delys was fluent in French, Italian, and English and studied at the Actors Studio in New York City before returning to Rome. He subsequently appeared in several Italian genre films, often portraying young daredevil characters, including Bread and Chocolate (1974), Young, Violent, Dangerous (1976), and Return of the 38 Gang (1977).

From 1973 to 1983, Delys also appeared in Italian fotoromanzi published by Lancio. Also known as photo comics or photonovels, fotoromanzi were popular magazines similar to comic books that used photographs rather than illustrations to tell stories. Through his work in the genre, Delys became well known in Italy, Portugal, and Latin America.

In 1990, Delys reunited with members of the original cast of the 1971 Coca-Cola "Hilltop" commercial for a remake that aired during Super Bowl XXIV.

== Death ==
Delys died of an illness in Cannes on May 31, 1993, at the age of 41.

== Personal life ==
Delys dated actress French actress Dominique Darel who he met in Cannes and they moved to Rome in 1968. Delys later dated Italian actress Eleonora Giorgi from 1975 to 1977.

In 1978, Delys returned to Cannes after experiencing financial difficulties with the Italian tax authorities.

== Filmography ==
- 1969: Gangster's Law
- 1972: L'Amour
- 1974: Bread and Chocolate
- 1974: La nottata
- 1975: The Girls Who'll Do Anything
- 1975: Vieni, vieni amore mio
- 1976: Young, Violent, Dangerous
- 1977: Return of the 38 Gang
