= Donna Jordan =

American model (born c. 1952)

- Born: c. 1950 (age ~76)
- Occupations: Model, actress, journalist
- Years active: 1969–present
- Children: 1
- Modelling information
- Hair colour: Blonde (dyed)
- Eye colour: Green
- Agency: Wilhelmina Models

Donna Jordan (born c. 1950) is an American model and actress. Dubbed the "Disco Marilyn" and "Queen of Kitsch," she became known for her platinum-blonde hair and 1940s-inspired style.

Jordan was associated with Pop artist Andy Warhol's Factory scene in the early 1970s. As a Warhol superstar, she starred in the film L'Amour (1972). She was also a muse to fashion illustrator Antonio Lopez and became one of the models known collectively as "Antonio's Girls." Jordan has appeared on the covers of several fashion magazines, including Vogue Italia and Vogue Paris.

== Early life ==
Donna Jordan grew up near Gramercy Park in New York City.

== Career ==
In 1969, Jordan was working as a salesgirl in New York when she was discovered at a Central Park be-in by fashion illustrator Antonio Lopez. She had "buck teeth and mousey brown hair," he recalled. She then began booking some small modeling jobs and became one of "Antonio's Girls."

In 1970, Lopez and makeup artist Corey Tippin transformed her appearance, with hairdresser Jean Louis David dyeing her hair platinum blonde and Tippin shaving her eyebrows. Lopez would exaggerate Jordan's features in his illustrations, which Tippin then translated into increasingly dramatic makeup looks. "Antonio had his eye on Donna and we transformed her," Tippin recalled. Her new look helped to establish Jordan as one of the most sought-after models.

In 1970, Jordan became part of Pop artist Andy Warhol's circle at the Factory and a prominent figure in his entourage. She co-starred with her friend and fellow Warhol Superstar Jane Forth in L'Amour (1972). Filming took place in Paris in the fall of 1970, after which Jordan remained in the city. While there, she and Warhol's entourage became acquainted with fashion designer Karl Lagerfeld. Jordan became one of Lagerfeld's favorite models, wearing his designs for Chloé.

Jordan was much desired for her vintage style and electric personality. The Daily News dubbed her as "Queen of Kitsch," for the eccentric outfits she assembled. In the spring of 1971, Jordan accompanied Warhol to Hollywood and was interviewed by Regis Philbin on Tempo, Los Angeles Channel 9.

During the early 1970s, Jordan was featured on the covers of several prominent publication, including Grazia, Interview, Vogue Italia, Vogue Paris, among others. She was photographed by Guy Bourdin, Barry Lategan, Helmut Newton, Irving Penn, and Chris von Wangenheim.

In 1973, Jordan had her platinum blonde hair cut into a Mia Farrow-style crop by Leonard of Mayfair. In an interviews with WWD Jordan stated that because of the new look she was no longer getting work with Vogue or Harper's Bazaar, "... since I don't have the Karen Graham look anymore. My image is Mademoiselle now," and later "they all remember me as that blonde goddess-type. Well, that look is finished. I'm no longer a fake blonde, kewpie doll. It's not me today." She also said that she was not interested in pursuing an acting career, preferring modeling, and if no work appeared she would relocate to Europe.

In 1974, Jordan moved to Milan where she would own a boutique. She appeared in a controversial advertisements for Jesus Jeans. The first billboard featured Jordan in front, from the waist to her thighs, with her pants' zipper open. "Though shalt have no other jeans but me" was the slogan. The second billboard with the slogan "Whoever loves me, follows me," showed Jordan from the backside in high-waisted shorts. The campaign was shot by her then boyfriend, photographer Oliviero Toscani. Causing huge controversy in Italy, the campaign was defended by Pier Paolo Pasolini. Jordan she would work as an editor at Italian Glamour.

Throughout the 1990s she appeared sporadically in the pages of Vogue Italia. In 2010, Jordan and her daughter Kate Ballo modeled resort 2011 looks for Organic by John Patrick. In 2013, she appeared in CR Fashion Book. In 2018, Jordan and Pat Cleveland celebrated the work of Kenzō Takada for Document Journal. Jordan was featured as one of the 100 celebrated women to cover the September 2020 issue of Vogue Italia. In 2022, she returned to the runway for a Warhol-inspired Tommy Hilfiger fashion show.

== Personal life ==
Jordan has one child, Kate Ballo. Ballo previously worked as a model and featured on the covers of Lei/Glamour, Lucky, Madame Figaro, and Town & Country. Ballo is now a "business witch."

As of 2023, Jordan resides in New York state and owns an organic food store.

== Legacy ==
Jordan was dubbed the "Disco Marilyn" and has been credited with popularizing the "bottle-bleached" platinum-blonde look later associated with Madonna. Madonna also paid homage to Jordan's Guy Bourdin photograph for the November 1970 issue of Vogue Paris on the cover of her 1990 single "Vogue."

Her gap-toothed, platinum-blonde look has subsequently been compared with models including Lara Stone and Lili Sumner. The infamous Spring 1971 Yves Saint Laurent "Scandal/Libération" collection was reported to have inspired in part by Jordan's 1940s fashion style. Her image as the "Queen of Kitsch" was also emulated by other models associated with Andy Warhol.

Jordan's influence continued to be referenced in fashion photography. Linda Evangelista, photographed by Steven Meisel, portrayed Jordan for the November 1994 cover of Vogue Italia. In December 2012, Vogue Italia published an editorial featuring Iselin Steiro, photographed by Paolo Roversi, that was heavily inspired by Jordan's look.

== Selected filmography ==
Year	Title	Director	Role	Note
1972	L'Amour	Paul Morrissey, Andy Warhol	Donna	
1973	La Dolce Vita Grande	Anton Perich		Short film
1974	The Perfume of the Lady in Black	Francesco Barilli	Francesca	
