= L'Amour (film) =

1972 film by Paul Morrissey and Andy Warhol

- Directed by: Paul Morrissey; Andy Warhol
- Written by: Paul Morrissey; Andy Warhol
- Starring: Donna Jordan; Michael Sklar; Jane Forth; Max Delys
- Cinematography: Jed Johnson
- Edited by: Jed Johnson; Lana Jokel
- Music by: Ben Weisman
- Distributed by: Altura Films International
- Release dates: March 20, 1972 (US Film Festival); May 10, 1973 (New York)
- Running time: 90 minutes

L'Amour, also known as Andy Warhol's L'Amour, is a 1972 underground film written and directed by Paul Morrissey and Andy Warhol. The film stars Donna Jordan, Michael Sklar, Jane Forth, and Max Delys.

A farcical comedy meant to be campy and raunchy, it was The Factory's version of the 1953 film How to Marry a Millionaire. The film received mixed reviews from critics and was accused of being too subdued and not as diverting as the previous Factory theatrical release Heat (1972).

The opening song "Theme (From L'Amour)" was written by Michael Sklar and sung by Cass Elliot from The Mamas and the Papas.

== Plot ==
Donna and Jane are American high school dropouts. Their friend Patti visits them and suggests that if the two girls want to be wealthy and glamorous, they should find rich husbands, and a plan is concocted for them to move to Paris to become models and seduce suitably wealthy men.

Jane and Donna are introduced to housemates Michael and Max, the millionaire son of a urinal cake tycoon and a sex worker, respectively. These two have their own agendas: Michael, a gay man, wants to get a wife to placate his family and to have someone to adopt the true object of his affections. Max, while happy to have a luxurious home to live in, feels lonely under Michael's overbearing control and finds himself enamored with the ditzy Jane. Michael and Donna come to an agreement: if he can get her on the cover of Vogue, she'll marry him. The quartet has fun all over Paris, taking photographs and roller skating around the park.

The relationships between the four are starting to change. Max becomes more frustrated with Michael's jealous, controlling nature, and Michael puts Max down for being an impoverished sex worker whenever Max stands up for himself. Max enjoys a fling with Jane, and Donna eventually realizes, after an extremely unsuccessful attempt to sleep with Michael, that he's avoiding being intimate with her. Things come to a head, and they have a falling-out when Michael overhears Max plotting to inherit his fortune after he dies. Michael confronts him, and Max leaves his house for good.

Max and Jane say their goodbyes in front of the Eiffel Tower, Max vowing to make his own living on the Parisian streets and Jane announcing that she's returning to New York City. The final scene reveals Michael and Donna eating in a Parisian cafe, Donna holding a copy of Vogue that shows she is indeed on the cover. Michael ultimately walks the streets of Paris with Donna as a companion.

== Cast ==
- Michael Sklar as Michael
- Donna Jordan as Donna
- Jane Forth as Jane
- Max Delys as Max
- Patti D'Arbanville as Patti
- Karl Lagerfeld as Karl
- Carol LaBrie as Carol
- Peter Greenlaw as Peter
- Corey Tippin as Corey
- Jay Johnson as Jay

== Production ==
Warhol superstars Jane Forth, Donna Jordan, Jay Johnson, and Corey Tippin were among illustrator Antonio Lopez's entourage and modeling in Paris by the summer of 1970. Forth was writing about their mischief to Warhol. The "really naughty" life they had been leading there served as the inspiration for the movie L'Amour.

L'Amour was filmed in one month in Paris from October to November 1970. Warhol financed the film and it was directed by Paul Morrissey, but Warhol was given credit as a co-director by the designers of the film's advertising. Warhol turned over his cameraman duties to his boyfriend Jed Johnson, who had primarily been an editor. Warhol spent most of his time during the production antique shopping with fashion designer Yves Saint Laurent who would regularly visit the set.

During the production, the actors were evicted from three hotels. Fashion designer Karl Lagerfeld, who appears in the film, lent Warhol and his entourage his apartment as a set and another apartment was borrowed from a friend of Brigid Berlin's. "I guess we went over there because we had a lot of apartments," said director Paul Morrissey. "That's the most important ingredient. We had run out of New York apartments," he added.

In a panel discussion following a screening of the film in 1972, Warhol said, "'We're now up to 1955 in moviemaking.' in explaining that he included shots of historical Paris sites as a continuity device since the film lacked a script and was improvise day-by-day."

Two of the working titles for the film were Gold Diggers '71 and Les Pissoirs de Paris.

== Release ==
L'Amour was shown at the USA Film Festival at Southern Methodist University in Dallas on March 20, 1972. The film opened at the Eastside Cinema in New York City on May 10, 1973.

L'Amour was the first Warhol and Morrissey film to qualify for an R rating.

== Reception ==
George Melly of The Observer had "nothing but praise" for L'Amour. "On another level, the piece lays bare the uneasy relationship between America and Europe," he said.

Ernest Leogrande of the Daily News wrote, "There are moments in 'L'Amour' watching Michael Sklar and Donna Jordan together when it seems we might have a contemporary Fred Astaire-Ginger Rogers team on our hands."

Bernard Drew of The Reporter Dispatch wrote, "There is raunchy humor to the proceedings, occasionally redolent of Henry Miller's 'Tropic of Cancer' and 'Quiet Days in Clichy,' in drag, and though the Warhol-Morrissey films continue to be ever so more technically expert, still enough amateurism and awkwardness remain to lend their faintly unsavory characters a touching charm a more sleekly glossy production might not otherwise render."

John Crittenden of The Record said, "It's supposed to be a comedy, but the jokes just aren't there. The elements of perversity don't shock or titillate. The inane chatter does not even parody itself."

Stanley Eichelbaum of the San Francisco Examiner noted that although this was the first Warhol production shot abroad, "Paris is almost completely ignored. Morrissey might just as well have made the film in the East Village for all the use he's made of the Parisian setting. The action is kept mainly indoors and the mostly American casts shows no reaction to being in France but boredom."

== See also ==
- Andy Warhol filmography
