= Women in Revolt =

- Theatrical release poster
- Directed by: Paul Morrissey
- Written by: Paul Morrissey
- Produced by: Andy Warhol
- Starring: Candy Darling; Jackie Curtis; Holly Woodlawn
- Cinematography: Jed Johnson; Andy Warhol
- Edited by: Paul Morrissey
- Music by: John Cale
- Release dates: November 6, 1971 (Filmex); December 17, 1971 (Los Angeles)
- Running time: 97 minutes
- Country: United States
- Language: English

Women in Revolt is a 1971 American comedy-drama film directed by Paul Morrissey and produced by Andy Warhol. Starring Warhol superstars Candy Darling, Jackie Curtis, and Holly Woodlawn, the film satirizes the women's liberation movement through the story of three women who form a radical feminist group called P.I.G. ("Politically Involved Girls"). Released in the aftermath of the 1968 shooting of Warhol, Women in Revolt has been interpreted as a response to radical feminism and the SCUM Manifesto by Valerie Solanas. The film features soundtrack music by John Cale.

== Background ==
Women in Revolt emerged amid growing tensions between the Factory scene and the feminist and gay liberation movements of the late 1960s and early 1970s. In a 1971 interview with David Bourdon for Art in America, director Paul Morrissey stated:

"Andy is despised by Gay Liberation and the Women's Revolt, whatever it is, because Andy just presents it and doesn't take a position. An artist's obligation is not to take a position ever, just to present. Andy's basic position on every subject, if he has any, is comical. … It's hard for Andy or any of the female impersonators to put down the movement... because it's a subject that neither Andy nor the female impersonators have the vaguest notion about. I don't know anything about it either. I hear a little bit about it on the talk shows-equal pay, etcetera blah blah. But the logical extension of what they obviously want is to be a man, so why not have men represent them?"

Bob Colacello, former editor of Andy Warhol's Interview magazine, later suggested the film was also shaped by the lingering aftermath of Warhol surviving a near-fatal shooting by radical feminist Valerie Solanas. According to Colacello, "Although Paul didn't come out and say it, and Andy certainly would have denied it, Women in Revolt is essentially Andy's revenge on Valerie Solanis [sic]. PIGS was his answer to SCUM." Solanas was the author of the self-published SCUM Manifesto. Another layer of irony is that the film's central feminist trio is portrayed by two transgender women and a drag performer.

== Plot ==
Set in New York City, Women in Revolt follows three disillusioned women—Candy, Jackie, and Holly—who form a radical feminist group called P.I.G. ("Politically Involved Girls"). Candy Darling plays Candy, a wealthy but unhappy heiress trapped in an incestuous relationship with her brother. Jackie Curtis portrays Jackie, an intellectual and schoolteacher who believes women are oppressed by society, while Holly Woodlawn plays Holly, a volatile nymphomaniac and model who alternates between desiring and despising men. Together, the trio attempt to build P.I.G. into a revolutionary movement, hoping to challenge male dominance and reinvent their lives. As the story unfolds, their personal frustrations, unstable relationships, and internal conflicts undermine their political ambitions. Their efforts at liberation ultimately descend into melodrama, sexual chaos, and disillusionment.

== Cast ==
- Candy Darling as Candy
- Jackie Curtis as Jackie
- Holly Woodlawn as Holly
- Paul Kilb as Jackie's First Boyfriend
- Jonathan Kramer as Journalist
- Michael Sklar as Max Morris
- Maurice Braddell as Candy's Father
- George Abagnalo as Photographer
- Johnny Kemper as Johnny Minute
- Martin Kove as Marty (credited as Marty Cove)
- Frank Cavestani as Construction Worker
- Jane Forth as Jane
- Penny Arcade as Penny

== Production ==
Filming began in spring 1970 and took about a year to complete. Morrissey later claimed sole responsibility for Women in Revolt, declaring " "I did everything": producing, casting, editing, directing, and cinematography. Not only had Andy done nothing—since Andy had no ideas—Andy wasn't even on the set." However, there are photographs of Warhol on set, and George Abagnalo, who worked at the Factory and appeared in the final scene, recalled that the film was consistently regarded at the Factory as "Andy's movie," and said Morrissey only claimed credit later.

Morrissey likely directed most of the film, although Jackie Curtis refused to perform for him, saying he "only makes Joe [Dallesandro] look good. Warhol and his boyfriend Jed Johnson are credited as cinematographers. Curtis recalled: "My big scene was when I was painting my toenails, and Paul Morrissey wanted that scene out, but I wanted it, and Andy said, 'I want the scene in.'" Curtis added, "I told Andy that I'd be in it only if he'd be behind the camera … all the scenes that I'm in, Andy shot them." Most of Candy Darling’s scenes were filmed at jewelry designer Kenneth Jay Lane's Murray Hill townhouse.

Morrissey himself gave earlier accounts crediting Warhol with the film's conception. In an unpublished interview, he said Warhol "thought up the idea of using Holly and Candy and Jackie as Women's Lib." He similarly told biographer Victor Bockris that he initially viewed the project as a deliberate challenge by Warhol, prompted in part by Valerie Solanas's association with the women's movement, but supported it once he realized Warhol was committed to making the film.

Although Morrissey received screenwriting credit, Johnson stated in a 1970 interview with After Dark that the dialogue was largely improvised: "A lot of people ask if we have a working script on our movies because the dialogue is so clever … what happens, as usual, is that Paul Morrissey gives a sentence to the actors and has them improvising on a topic while the camera is rolling."

Working titles for the film included P.I.G.S. ("Politically Involved GirlS"), Blonde on a Bum Trip, and Sex—possibly a reference to actress Mae West's 1926 play Sex.

== Release and box-office ==
Women in Revolt premiered under the title Sex at Grauman's Chinese Theatre in Hollywood on November 6, 1971, as part of the inaugural Los Angeles International Film Exposition (Filmex). It was retitled Andy Warhol's Women for its Los Angeles theatrical opening at the Cinema Theater on December 17.

Warhol had difficulty securing a distributor, reportedly because of the film's simulated sex and full-frontal male nudity. Warhol eventually rented the Cine Malibu, an East 59th Street theater known for sexploitation films, for its New York opening. By the time it opened there on February 16, 1972, the film had been retitled Women in Revolt. The following afternoon, a group of about a dozen women protested outside the theater carrying protest signs. Vincent Fremont monitored ticket sales from beside the box office to ensure that receipts were properly accounted for.

On March 22, 1972, Variety reported that Women in Revolt was in its sixth week at the Cine Malibu, where the previous week's estimated gross was $6,000. This followed grosses of approximately $6,500 in the fourth week and $8,000 in the third. Variety characterized the results as "fair enough for [the] pint-sized location."

Curator Sam Green arranged for a mid-April 1972 screening of Women in Revolt at Wesleyan University, where his father was dean of fine arts. Darling made a personal appearance and kept the ticket-sale proceeds.

In late April 1972, Women in Revolt opened at Janus Two in Washington, D.C. On May 3, Variety reported that the film was in its second week and had grossed an estimated $3,000, matching the previous week's take.

The film was subsequently selected for the inaugural International Film Festival Rotterdam in 1972.

== Critical reception ==
The film received mostly favorable reviews. Chuck Emerson wrote for the University of Redlands student publication, The Bulldog: "Sex is technically better than Warhol's previous epics … Everything is a joke, a put-on, there's no malice or cynicism in Warhol's intent. Sex, like most of Warhol's stuff, has a curious innocence in its blatant crudeness."

Kevin Thomas wrote for the Los Angeles Times that Warhol fans would find the film "uproarious" and likened it to a spoof of a "'Valley of the Dolls'-type plot."

Vincent Canby of The New York Times wrote, "'Women in Revolt' … is not as consistently funny (and awful) as 'Trash,' but a lot of it is as hilarious as it is dirty. The film carries no screenplay credit, so I have no idea who is responsible for the dialogue, which often is foolish and occasionally inspired in the way that good parodies must be."

Jeanne Miller of the San Francisco Examiner called it a "trashy little stag film," and added Warhol's "performers are so grotesque, his technical skills so non-existent and his sensibilities' so vulgar that not an iota of amusement merges from this sordid farce."

Writing for Vogue, Molly Haskell described Women in Revolt as a "lewd and funny commentary on Women’s Lib" and argued that it was "ultimately no more defamatory to Women's Lib than it is to the Hollywood myths of the 'forties and 'fifties." She viewed the film as both "parody and hommage," noting that it "re-creates the masochistic misery of the woman's picture while remaining faithful to its own spirit of funk."

== See also ==
- List of American films of 1971
- Andy Warhol filmography
