= Carol LaBrie =

American dancer and model (1946–2021)

Carol LaBrie Rose
- Born: December 26, 1946; El Cerrito, California, U.S.
- Died: February 18, 2021 (aged 74); New Lebanon, New York, U.S.
- Occupations: dancer; model; actress
- Spouse(s): Gilles Raysse; Uli Rose
- Children: 5

Carol LaBrie Rose (December 27, 1946 – February 18, 2021) was an American model, dancer, and actress. She is recognized as the first African American model to appear on the cover of Vogue Italia in 1971. LaBrie began her career as a dancer before transitioning into modeling, later becoming associated with Andy Warhol's circle as a Warhol superstar. She was also a muse to fashion illustrator Antonio Lopez and fashion designer Kenzō Takada, appearing frequently in their creative work.

== Biography ==
Carol LaBrie was born to Sears LaBrie and Wilda Simien in El Cerrito, California on December 27, 1946.

Her sister Alice LaBrie Hille was a television producer who was married to radio personality Hal Jackson.

LaBrie decided to leave her Wall Street secretarial job and relocated to Los Angeles, where she began dancing at the popular nightclub Whiskey-a-Go-Go. She had previously taken ballet for seven years.

In 1965, LaBrie was a model on the game show The Price Is Right. In 1967, she was booked as a dancer at the Tropicana in Las Vegas.

LaBrie gave up her career as a dancer and began modeling again with the assistance of film director Bob Rafelson. "He called Nina Blanchard, the top Los Angeles agent, and when she saw me, she said, 'Great, let’s do some pictures.' So I got pictures done, and my first job was a TV commercial," she recalled.

When she arrived in New York, she met Gilles Raysse, a French producer of television commercials, through designer Fernando Sanchez. Two days after their first meeting at Pamela's Soul Food Restaurant, LaBrie proposed. They were married the very next day. The couple later had a son. On her wedding night, LaBrie flew to Paris for a meeting with designer Yves Saint Laurent. He wanted her to become one of his house models but she turned down the offer because that meant she "couldn't do anything else."

LaBrie was featured in a spread with fellow model RoAnne Nesbitt in the February 1969 issue of Vogue magazine. She appeared on the cover of the October 1970 issue of Essence magazine.

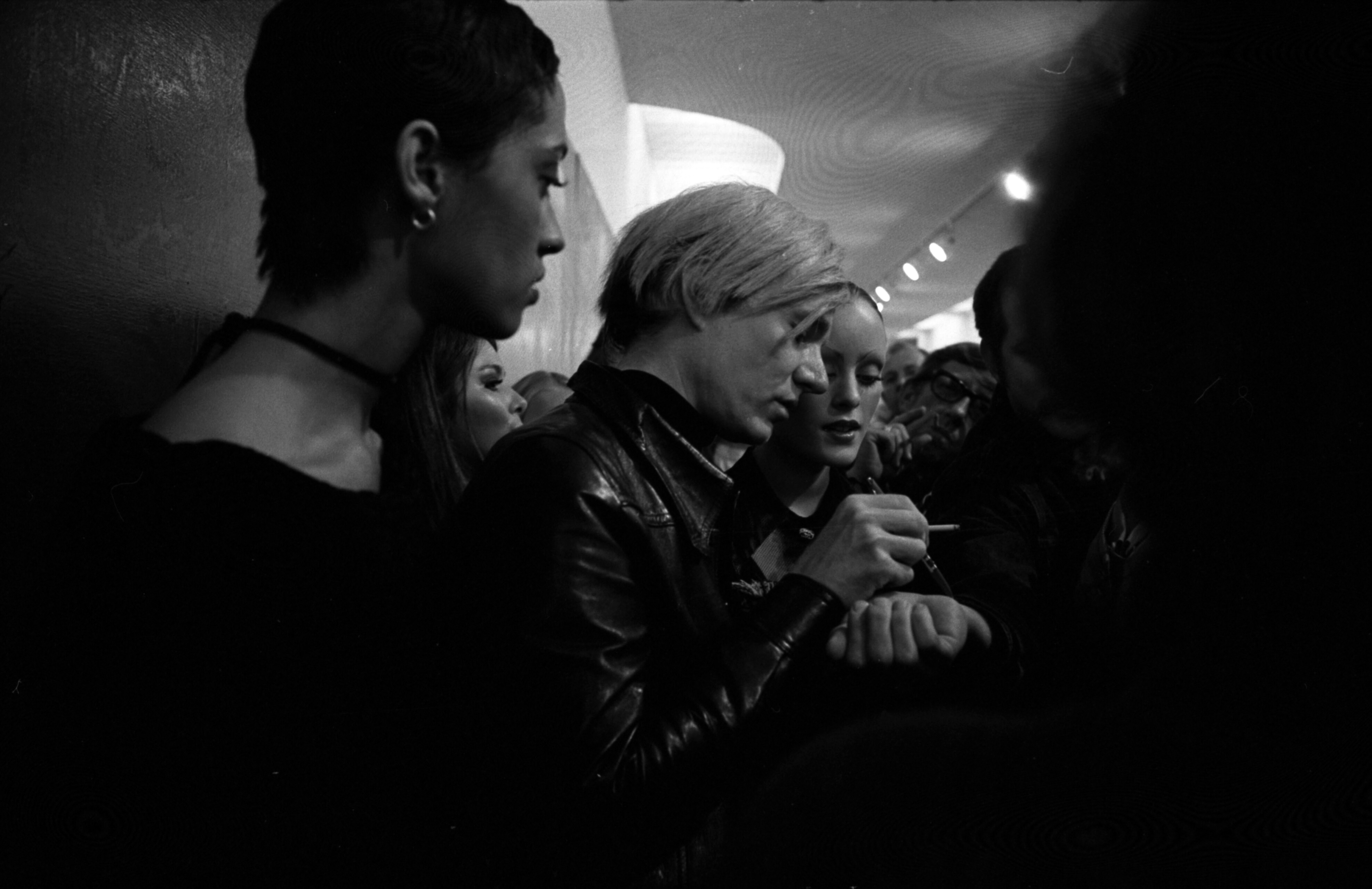
LaBrie with Andy Warhol and Jane Forth at the Pasadena Art Museum, 1970

In 1970, LaBrie was part of pop artist Andy Warhol's ensemble of superstars. She appeared in his film L'Amour (1972), which was filmed in Paris in the fall of 1970. LaBrie was also slated to star in a movie that Warhol had planned to produce about Walt Whitman set during the Civil War. Filmmaker Paul Morrissey, who directed Warhol's productions, reportedly tried to pitch the movie but the film studios wouldn't back the project.

LaBrie and Raysse were photographed by Francesco Scavullo for the March 1970 edition of Harper's Bazaar. LaBrie became the first Black model to appear on the cover of Vogue Italia when she was featured in the magazine's July/August 1971 edition.

LaBrie had difficulty with bookings because of her fair complexion so she moved to Paris and became one of "Antonio's Girls," a muse of Puerto Rican illustrator Antonio Lopez. When her husband Raysse became the business partner of Japanese-born French designer Kenzō Takada, a friendship blossomed between LaBrie and Takada. She taught him English and modeled exclusively for his brand "JAP."

After divorcing Raysse, LaBrie married photographer Uli Rose and they had four children.

LaBrie had a minor role in the French film Body of My Enemy (1976), but she gave up her modeling and film career to focus on being a housewife and mother. "Modeling was not my greatest joy... Models have to have other goals and ideals, to do something and help other people. Be a role model. Be beautiful, be Black, but be what you are because you're beautiful as you are," she said.

LaBrie died at the age of 75 in New Lebanon, New York on February 18, 2021.

== Filmography ==
- 1972: L'Amour
- 1976: Body of My Enemy
