= Young, Violent, Dangerous =

- Italian theatrical release poster
- Directed by: Romolo Guerrieri
- Screenplay by: Fernando di Leo; Nico Ducci
- Story by: Fernando di Leo
- Based on: Bravi ragazzi bang bang and In pineta si uccide meglio by Giorgio Scerbanenco
- Produced by: Marcelo Partini; Ermanno Curti
- Starring: Tomas Milian; Eleonora Giorgi; Stefano Patrizi; Max Delys
- Cinematography: Erico Menczer
- Edited by: Antonio Siciliano
- Music by: Gianfranco Plenizio; Enrico Pieranunzi
- Production company: Centro di Produzioni Citta di Milano
- Distributed by: Interfilm
- Release date: 2 September 1976 (Italy)
- Running time: 100 minutes
- Country: Italy
- Box office: ₤856,779 million

Young, Violent, Dangerous (Italian: Liberi armati pericolosi) is a 1976 Italian poliziottesco film directed by Romolo Guerrieri. It is based on the short stories Bravi ragazzi bang bang and In pineta si uccide meglio, both included in Giorgio Scerbanenco's short stories collection Milano calibro 9.

== Plot ==
In Italy, three young men go on a violent crime spree and end up being chased by the police across the country.

== Cast ==
- Tomas Milian as Commissioner
- Stefano Patrizi as Mario Farra
- Max Delys as Luigi Morandi
- Benjamin Lev as Giòvanni Etrusco
- Eleonora Giorgi as Lea
- Diego Abatantuono as Lucio
- Venantino Venantini as Sign. Morandi
- Gloria Piedimonte as Friend of Lucio
- Tom Felleghy as Prof. Farra
- Peter Berling as Oberwald

== Production ==
Young, Violent, Dangerous story by Fernando di Leo was based on the short stories of Giorgio Scerbanenco, specifically Bravi ragazzi bang bang and In pineta si uccide meglio, both included in his short stories collection Milano calibro 9.

The film was shot at Elios Film in Milan and on location in Milan and Pavia.

== Release ==
Young, Violent, Dangerous was distributed theatrically in Italy by Interfilm on 2 September 1976. The film grossed a total of 856,779,300 Italian lire domestically. The film was released on DVD in Italy by the label Raro and its soundtrack on compact disc by Beat Records.

== See also ==
- List of Italian films of 1976

== Notes ==
=== References ===
- Curti, Roberto (2013). Italian Crime Filmography, 1968-1980. McFarland. ISBN 978-0786469765.
