= Suneet Varma =

Indian fashion designer

- Born: 1964 (age 61–62); New Delhi, India
- Occupation: Fashion Designer
- Known for: Suneet Varma Couture line and stores

Suneet Varma (born 1964) is an Indian fashion designer. He launched his first Couture collection in 1987 after returning from Europe where he worked for Yves Saint Laurent to master traditional artisanal techniques. He set up a self-named boutique at DLF Emporio Delhi in 2009.

Every year he showcases his couture collection based on a theme . His 2010 collection "The Pirates of Couture" was inspired by fashion illustrator Antonio Lopez's book Antonio's Tales from the Thousand & One Nights. He did a fashion show themed on Kamasutra in July 2011.

== Early life and education ==
His father was a textile consultant, and he was brought up in New Delhi. After his schooling he went to London to study sculpting, however after doing a foundation course in sculpting and painting, he switched to fashion and graduated from the London College of Fashion in costume history.

== Career ==
Varma started his career in 1986, working as an intern with Yves Saint Laurent label in Paris, subsequently he worked for the Lalbhai group (Arvind Mills) in Ahmedabad on a denim project after the company tied up with fashion designer Gloria Vanderbilt. He had his first fashion show in 1991. In 2009, he started design collaboration with American luxury handbag brand, Judith Leiber and is also the first Indian designer to design the interiors of the BMW 7 series.

== Personal life ==
Varma is openly gay. He married fashion designer Rahul Arora in 2013.
