= William Como =

American journalist

- Born: November 10, 1925; Williamstown, Massachusetts, U.S.
- Died: January 1, 1989 (aged 63); New York City, New York, U.S.
- Occupations: Dancer, journalist
- Writing career
- Pen name: Bill Como
- Notable works: Editor-in-chief, Dance Magazine

William "Bill" Como (November 10, 1925 – January 1, 1989) was the editor-in-chief of Dance Magazine during the period of 1970–1988, when it was "the publication of record", crucial for linking many developments in dance into "a dance world", through culturally-burgeoning decades that rank among the most important theater-arts epochs of the twentieth century.

== Biography ==
William Como, born in Williamstown, Massachusetts, was drafted into the US army, straight from high school, at age eighteen, to serve in the Philippines during World War II. On his release from service in 1945, he enrolled at the American Academy of Dramatic Arts in New York City. From 1948 to 1953 he worked as a model, dancer and actor in New York and California, but in 1953 left his contracts for personal reasons, finding employment as a “gofer” for Dance Magazine, at $60/week. Associate publisher Jean Gordon soon recognized his potential, and promoted him to sales manager in 1954, then to advertising manager and assistant to the publisher: posts he held from 1961 to 1969.

In May 1968 Como also became, for eleven years, Editor-in-Chief of After Dark, a NYC entertainment magazine, which he developed from Ballroom Dance Magazine.

With the passing of Dance Magazine owner Rudolph Orthwine, and Jean Gordon assuming ownership, in late 1969 Como succeeded Lydia Joel as Editor-in-Chief, joined by Managing Editor Richard Philp, in Dance's small office on West 42d Street. Under Jean Gordon's and Bill Como's command the magazine soon grew in importance, becoming the main national source of information linking the dance world—and, through its growing influence, a forceful shaper of that world nationally and internationally, as it championed small and regional dance companies.

Como was involved in other initiatives for promoting excellence in, and appreciation of, ballet in the United States. Along with Walter Terry (see Modern dance) and others, Como was one of the founders, in 1979, of the USA International Ballet Competition in Jackson, Mississippi, held every four years.

With the assistance of Philp and with Herbert Migdoll’s designs, Como introduced a distinguishing feature to Dance Magazine: a separate monthly "Portfolio", printed on heavy stock paper, dedicated to prominent people in the dance world, historical repertoire, events and institutions. Many of these are, in effect, condensed monographs, of permanent research value. He wrote a regular one-page "Editor's Notes" column for the magazine and published articles and introductions to books. In later years he had a weekly half-hour "Performance Today" program on National Public Radio. Bill Como did not live to write his planned autobiography, which, given his great sociability and his publishing positions, would have provided a lively and informative window on an important epoch in the history of theater arts.

William Como died in hospital of late-diagnosed lung cancer on January 1, 1989, nursed toward the end by ballet master Raoul Gelabert.

A "William Como Dance Magazine Scholarship", awarded yearly, has been established.

== Writings ==
- Raoul Gelabert's Anatomy for the Dance: With exercises to improve technique and prevent injuries. As told to William Como. New York: Danab Publishing Co., 2 vol. 1964, 1966
- The Essence of Béjart. Danab Publishing Co., 1972
- Nureyev. New York: Danab Publishing Co., 1973 (small, well-illustrated fascicule)
- Margot Fonteyn. New York: Danab Publishing Co., 1973
