= Michael Sklar =

American actor

Michael Joel Sklar (July 12, 1944 – March 5, 1984) was an American actor, writer, songwriter, and fashion retailer. He was best known as a Warhol superstar, starring in several films by Warhol and Paul Morrissey.

From his obituary in the New York Times:

Mr. Sklar wrote comedy for the television show Laugh-In and appeared on that show and on the Sha Na Na show. He acted in two Andy Warhol films, Trash and L'Amour, and appeared in the Broadway production of Scarpino. In the early 1970s, he founded a company called Childstar, for which he designed jewelry. He also designed greeting cards and was an importer of Japanese textiles and antiques.

Sklar died of lymphoma at the New York University Medical Center on March 5, 1984.

== Selected filmography ==
- Trash (1970) - Mr. Michaels
- Women in Revolt (1971) - Max Morris
- Scarecrow in a Garden of Cucumbers (1972) - Noel Airman
- L'Amour (1973) - Michael
