= John Patrick (fashion designer) =

American fashion designer

- Born: Delmar, New York, US
- Education: Fashion Institute of Technology
- Occupation: Fashion designer
- Label: Organic by John Patrick
- Website: organicbyjohnpatrick.com

John Patrick is an American fashion designer and retailer. He is known for being an early adopter of sustainable fashion, and is a co-founder of the eponymous Organic by John Patrick clothing label.

== Early life and career ==
Patrick was born in Delmar, New York, and grew up in the nearby hamlet of Elsmere. Patrick was raised in a self-sufficient commune where members grew their own food and often did not wear clothes. He has described his childhood as "free-spirited" and his parents as "pre hippie".

At age 15, Patrick opened a store in Saratoga Springs selling vintage items. He moved to New York City to become a watercolor painter, but later decided he wanted to make hats, and took a millinery class at the Fashion Institute of Technology in Manhattan. Barneys New York started carrying Patrick's hat collection in 1982. Throughout the 1980s and 1990s, Patrick designed items for his John Patrick Collection label.

== Organic by John Patrick ==
=== Founding ===
In 2004, Patrick and his life partner Walter Fleming launched Organic by John Patrick, a fashion brand focused on sustainable and eco-friendly practices. Patrick attributed the company's founding to his environmentally conscious values and upbringing, as well as his desire to create positive change in the aftermath of the 9/11 attacks. In 2000, Patrick moved from Manhattan to an abandoned warehouse in upstate New York and began to research organic materials. That year, Patrick was one of the first designers to establish a relationship with organic farm collectives in Peru.

=== Style ===
Known for their slip dresses, Organic by John Patrick is also credited with making the first organic Oxford shirt in conjunction with Creditex in Peru. Patrick has stated that minimalism is a hallmark of the brand. Florence Kane of Vogue magazine described the style as one that "defies the crunchy conception of how a (for lack of a better word) "green" collection is expected to look".

Organic by John Patrick's Spring 2009 line, "American Gothic", featured rural-styled clothes modeled after Great Depression-era fashion, in a nod to the ongoing Great Recession.

=== Production ===
The production of Organic by John Patrick is done with partners in Peru, New York, Scotland, Japan and Nepal, and only uses organic fabrics. The company works with its vendors to create sustainable textiles and has helped its factories adopt more environmentally sound manufacturing methods. Organic by John Patrick has used botanical dyes, digital print techniques, recycled fabrics and organic wool yarns, and resurrected traditional practices such as hand weaving. Patrick has stated that he uses recycled materials, such as recycled polyester, in every one of his collections. In 2018, the company began working with Ni En More, a nonprofit women's sewing studio in Juarez, Mexico.

Organic by John Patrick has used source maps to educate buyers about how products were created and where they originated from. This has been accomplished through the use of QR codes as well as video.

=== Awards and recognition ===
In 2008, Organic by John Patrick was named a finalist for the CFDA/Vogue Fashion Fund award. The company also received an Honorary Award for Ethical Fashion as part of the first annual theFashionSpot Style Awards in 2013.

== Other ventures ==
=== Retail stores ===
Patrick owns two Communitie boutique stores in Amagansett, New York, and Marfa, Texas, which sell clothing and jewelry as well as global textiles, pottery and art. In 2021, Organic by John Patrick opened a store in Bridgehampton, New York.

=== Writing ===
In 2008, Patrick contributed to FutureFashion White Papers, a collection of essays with a foreword by Diane von Furstenberg that includes a variety of designers, models, business owners and farmers discussing the apparel and textile industries and environmental problems.

=== The John Patrick Show ===
In April 2010, a six-episode TV show about Patrick called The John Patrick Show was greenlit for Discovery's Planet Green channel. However, the show ultimately did not air.

== Personal life ==
Patrick is a china ink painter. His life partner is Organic by John Patrick cofounder Walter Fleming.
