= Green Eyes =

Green Eyes most commonly refers to:

- Green eyes, an eye color

It may also refer to:

== Music ==
- "Green Eyes (Aquellos Ojos Verdes)", a 1929 popular song
- "Green Eyes", a song by Kate Wolf from her 1983 album Give Yourself to Love
- "Green Eyes", a 1985 song by Hüsker Dü from their album Flip Your Wig
- "Green Eyes", a 1997 song by Nick Cave and the Bad Seeds from their album The Boatman's Call
- "Green Eyes", a 2000 song by Erykah Badu from her album Mama's Gun
- "Green Eyes", a 2002 song by Coldplay from their album A Rush of Blood to the Head
- "Green Eyes", a 2006 song by Joe Purdy from his album You Can Tell Georgia
- "Green Eyes", a 2007 song by Akeboshi from his album Meet Along the Way
- "Green Eyes", a 2010 song by Wavves from their album King of the Beach
- "Green Eyes", a 2021 song by Arlo Parks from her album Collapsed in Sunbeams

== Film ==
- Green Eyes (1918 film), a silent drama film directed by Roy William Neill
- Green Eyes (1934 film), an American film directed by Richard Thorpe
- Green Eyes (1977 film), an American TV movie
- The Green Eyed, a 2015 Nigerian film directed by Blessing O. Uduefe

== Literature ==
- Green Eyes (novel), a book by Lucius Shepard
- Green Eyes, a book by Karen Robards

== Other ==
- Figuratively, 'green-eyed' indicates envy
- Greeneye, a family of deep-sea fish
- Green Eyes, a one-act play by Tennessee Williams
