= Kenzō Takada =

Japanese-French fashion designer (1939-2020)

- 高田 賢三
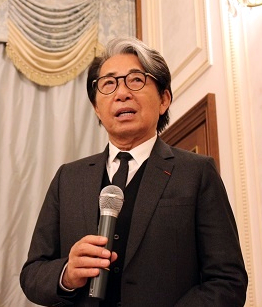
- Takada in 2017
- Born: 27 February 1939; Himeji, Hyōgo, Empire of Japan
- Died: 4 October 2020 (aged 81); Neuilly-sur-Seine, Île-de-France, France
- Education: Bunka Fashion College
- Occupations: Fashion designer, film director
- Known for: Founder of Kenzo
- Partner: Xavier de Castella
- Awards: Ordre des Arts et des Lettres

Kenzō Takada (高田 賢三, Takada Kenzō; [takada kenꜜzoː]; 27 February 1939 – 4 October 2020) was a Japanese–French fashion designer living in France. He founded Kenzo, a worldwide clothing brand that also markets skincare and perfumes. Takada was the honorary president of the Asian Couture Federation.

== Early life ==
Takada was born on 27 February 1939 in Himeji, Hyōgo Prefecture. He was one of seven children of Kenji and Shizu Takada, who ran a hotel. His love for fashion developed at an early age, particularly through reading his sisters' magazines. In 1957, he briefly attended Kobe City University of Foreign Studies. However, after his father died during Takada's first year at university, he withdrew from the program against his family's wishes. In 1958, he enrolled at Tokyo's Bunka Fashion College, which had then just opened its doors to male students. During his time at Bunka, Takada won a fashion design competition, the Soen Award, in 1961. At this time, Takada gained experience working in the Sanai department store, where he designed up to 40 outfits a month as a girl's clothing designer.

Takada was inspired by Paris, especially designer Yves Saint Laurent. His interest in Paris was fostered by his teacher at Bunka, Chie Koike, who was educated at L'École de la chambre syndicale de la couture parisienne. In preparation for the 1964 Summer Olympics, the government demolished Takada's apartment in 1964, compensating him. Advised by his mentor, using his compensation, Takada embarked on a month-long sea voyage to Paris, via Hong Kong, Saigon, Mumbai, and Marseille. He arrived at the Gare de Lyon train station on 1 January 1965. Takada's first impression of Paris was that it was "dismal and bleak", but began to warm to the city when his taxi took him past the Notre Dame de Paris, which he described as "magnificent".

== Fashion career ==
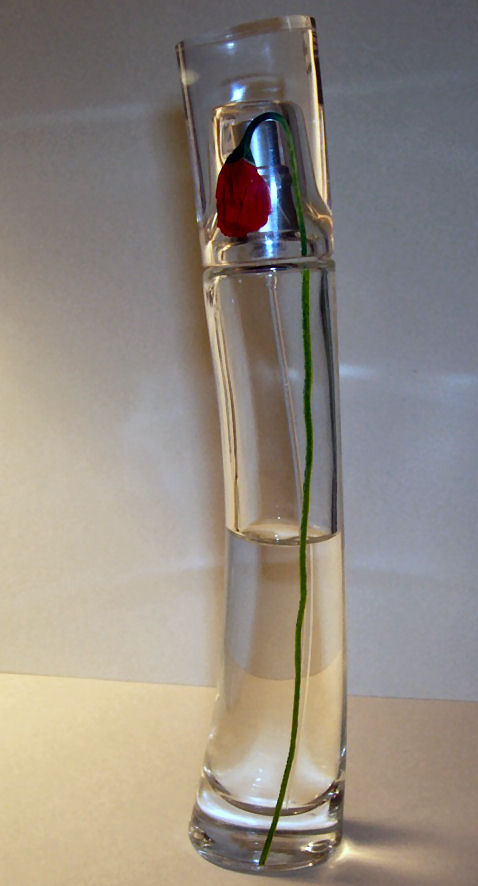
Bottle of the fragrance Flower by Kenzo

Takada was a fashion maverick, known for his colorful and free-spirited collections that energized the ready-to-wear runways of the French capital starting in the 1970s. Initially, Takada struggled in Paris, selling sketches of designs to fashion houses for 25 F each. He had intended to leave Paris for Japan after a few months, but vowed not to do so until he had created something there, as he was determined to open a boutique fashion house in an area where his peers had not opened one. During this time, Takada worked as a stylist at a textile manufacturer named Pisanti.

In 1970, while at a flea market, Takada met a woman who offered to let a small space in the Galerie Vivienne to him cheaply. Takada accepted the offer, and opened up shop as a designer. With very little money to work with, he mixed and matched $200 in fabrics from the Saint Pierre market in Montmartre, creating an eclectic and bold first fashion collection. Takada presented the collection at his first fashion show at the Galerie Vivienne. With no money to afford professional fashion models for the event, Takada and his friends opted to paint the pimples of an acne-covered model green.

Inspired by painter Henri Rousseau, and in particular The Dream, Takada painted the interior of his shop with a jungle-like floral aesthetic that included representations of Carol LaBrie, wife of Takada's business partner Gilles Raysse and a muse for the designer at the time. Wanting to combine the jungle aesthetic with his homeland, the designer decided to name his first store "Jungle Jap". The store's name did not go without controversy: in 1971, the Japanese American Citizens League issued a summons to Takada while on his first visit to the United States, challenging him to remove the word "Jap" from his business's name. However, the State supreme court upheld the ability to use the term as part of a trademark the following year. Takada and his team opted to rename the brand once Takada returned to France.

Takada's efforts paid off quickly – in June 1970, Elle featured one of his designs on its cover. He moved locations from the Galerie Vivienne to the Passage Choiseul in 1970. Takada's collection was presented in New York City and Tokyo in 1971. The next year, he won the Fashion Editor Club of Japan's prize.

In 1973-74, he made perhaps his biggest mark on fashion by leading a silhouette change, loosening and increasing the volume of the popular peasant styles of the time to create what came to be called the "Big Look," with "big" meaning voluminous, soon to become the main high fashion trend of the mid-1970s, a period during which he was cited as originating a number of trends, including a 1976 miniskirt revival and the wearing of oversized menswear by women. Women wearing oversized menswear would become a popular Paris street trend and be picked up by actress Diane Keaton, who would wear an interpretation of it (minus any actual Kenzo garments) in the Woody Allen film Annie Hall that would become known as the "Annie Hall look." In 1974, just after Kenzo's launch of the Big Look, fashion journalist Patricia Shelton rated him as second only to Yves Saint Laurent in influence, noting that both designers were astute at predicting what would appeal to women on the street. He was known to be the main influence on US designer Perry Ellis.

In October 1976, Takada opened his flagship store, Kenzo, in the Place des Victoires. Takada proved his sense of dramatic appearance when, in 1978 and 1979, he held his shows in a circus tent, finishing with horsewomen performers wearing transparent uniforms and he himself riding an elephant. Takada even had the chance to direct a film called Yume, yume no ato, which was released in 1981.

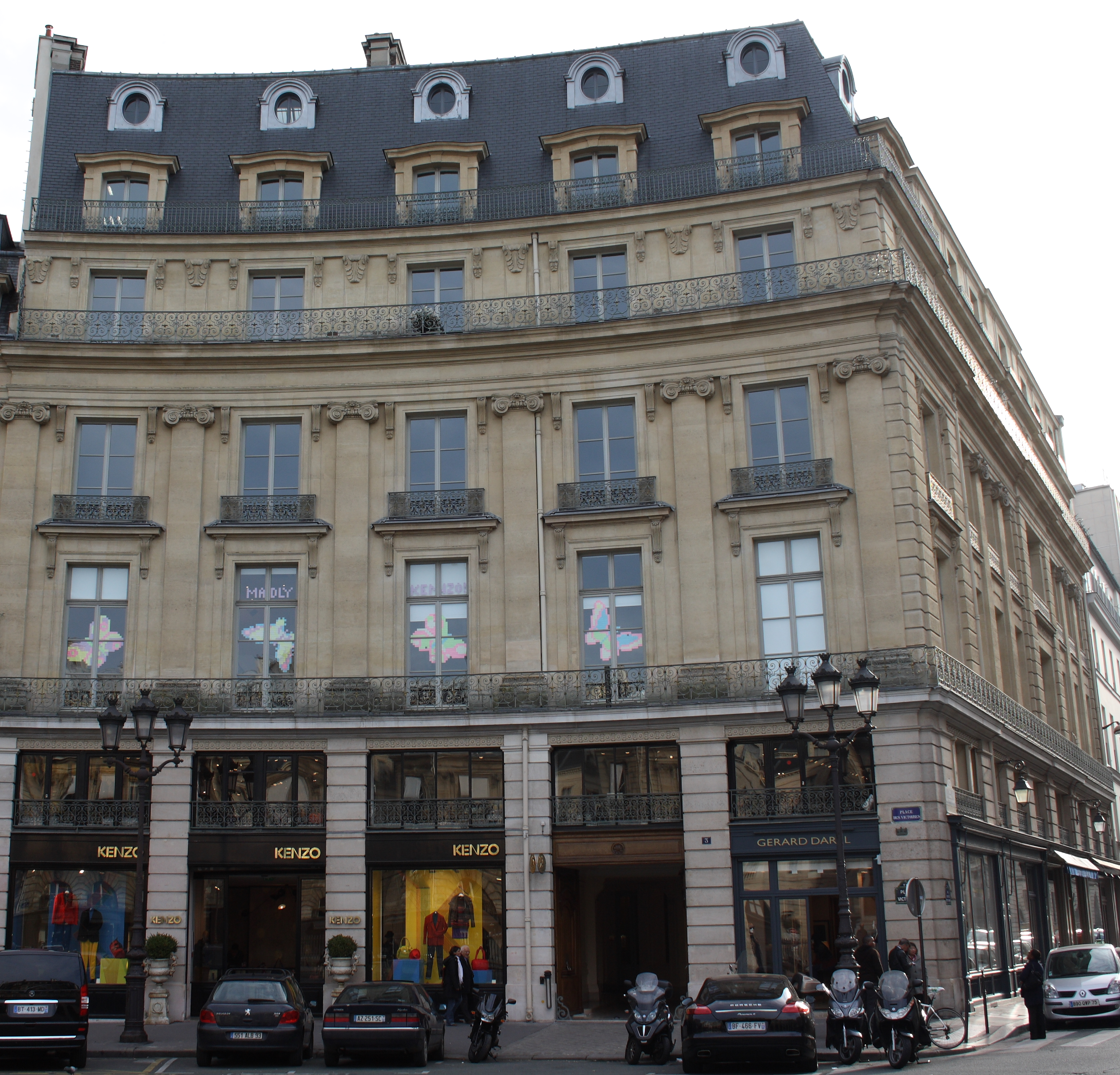
Kenzo fashion house in Paris

Takada's business flourished into the 1980s. Kenzo's annual sales grew from 30,000,000 F in 1979, to 240,000,000 F in 1984. Takada's first men's collection was launched in 1983. In August 1984, The Limited Stores announced that they had signed Takada to design a less-expensive clothing line called Album by Kenzo. A children's line called Kenzo Jungle, as well as men's and women's jeans, was released in 1986.

Takada also made ventures into the perfume business. He first experimented with perfumes by releasing King Kong in 1980, which he created "just for fun". In 1988, his women's perfume line began with Kenzo de Kenzo (now known as Ça Sent Beau), Parfum d'été, Le monde est beau, and L'eau par Kenzo. Kenzo pour Homme was his first men's perfume (1991). FlowerbyKenzo, launched in 2000, was listed by Vogue's website as one of the best classic French perfumes of all time. In 2001, a skincare line, KenzoKI was also launched.

Since 1993 the brand Kenzo is owned by the French luxury goods company LVMH. In 2016, he created a perfume for Avon.

== Retirement and later activities ==
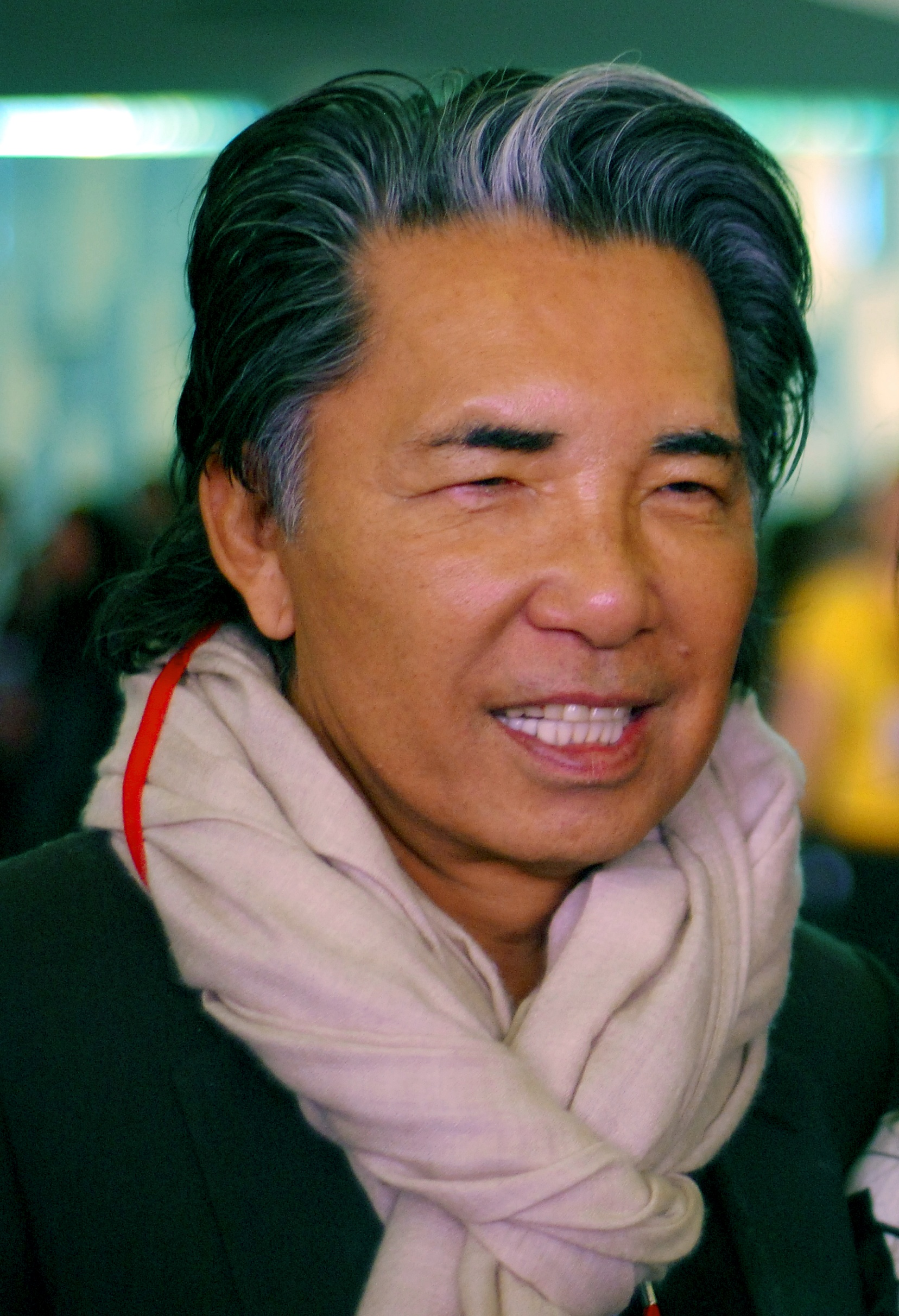
Takada in 2008

Takada announced his retirement in 1999 to pursue a career in art, leaving Roy Krejberg and Gilles Rosier to handle the design of Kenzo's men's and women's clothing, respectively. However, in 2005 he reappeared as a decoration designer presenting Gokan Kobo (五感工房 "workshop of the five senses"), a brand of tableware, home objects, and furniture. After a few years off, he wanted to take a new direction, stating "when I stopped working five years ago, I went on vacation, I rested, I traveled. And when I decided to work again, I told myself it would be in decoration, more than fashion." Additionally, in 2013 Kenzo joined the Asian Couture Federation as the organisation's inaugural Honorary President. In 2010 Kenzo's paintings were the subject of a one-man exhibition in Paris titled "Un Certain Style de Vie", A Certain Way of Life".

Takada was made a Knight of the Legion of Honour on 2 June 2016. He was further honored by a Lifetime Achievement Award at the 55th Fashion Editors' Club of Japan Awards in 2017. That same year, Takada unveiled a new collection with Roche Bobois, giving its Mah Jong sofa new upholstery and creating a line of ceramics. Following his departure from the fashion industry, Takada occasionally ventured back into fashion. In 2019 he designed costumes for a production of Madama Butterfly by the Tokyo Nikikai Opera Foundation. He also used his eye for design in other ways, collaborating with the Mandarin Oriental Jumeira in Dubai to design the hotel's first publicly-displayed Christmas tree during the 2019 holiday season.

In January 2020, Takada announced that he would be launching a new lifestyle brand named K3 with entrepreneur Jonathan Bouchet Manheim. The brand made its first appearance on 17 January 2020 at the Maison et Objet trade show, as well as in a Parisian showroom.

== Personal life and death ==
Takada was in a relationship with French architect Xavier de Castella, who died in August 1990 from an AIDS-related illness. De Castella helped design Takada's 1,300-square-meter (14,000-square-foot) Japanese-style house, which started construction in 1987 and was completed in 1993.

Takada died on 4 October 2020 from complications from COVID-19 while hospitalized at the American Hospital of Paris in Neuilly-sur-Seine during the COVID-19 pandemic in France. He was 81 years old.

== Awards ==
- France: Ordre des Arts et des Lettres / Chevalier, 1984
- Japan: Medals of Honor / Medal with Purple Ribbon, 1999
- France: Legion of Honour / Chevalier, 2016

== See also ==
- Japanese community of Paris
