= Herbert Migdoll =

American artist (1934–2025)

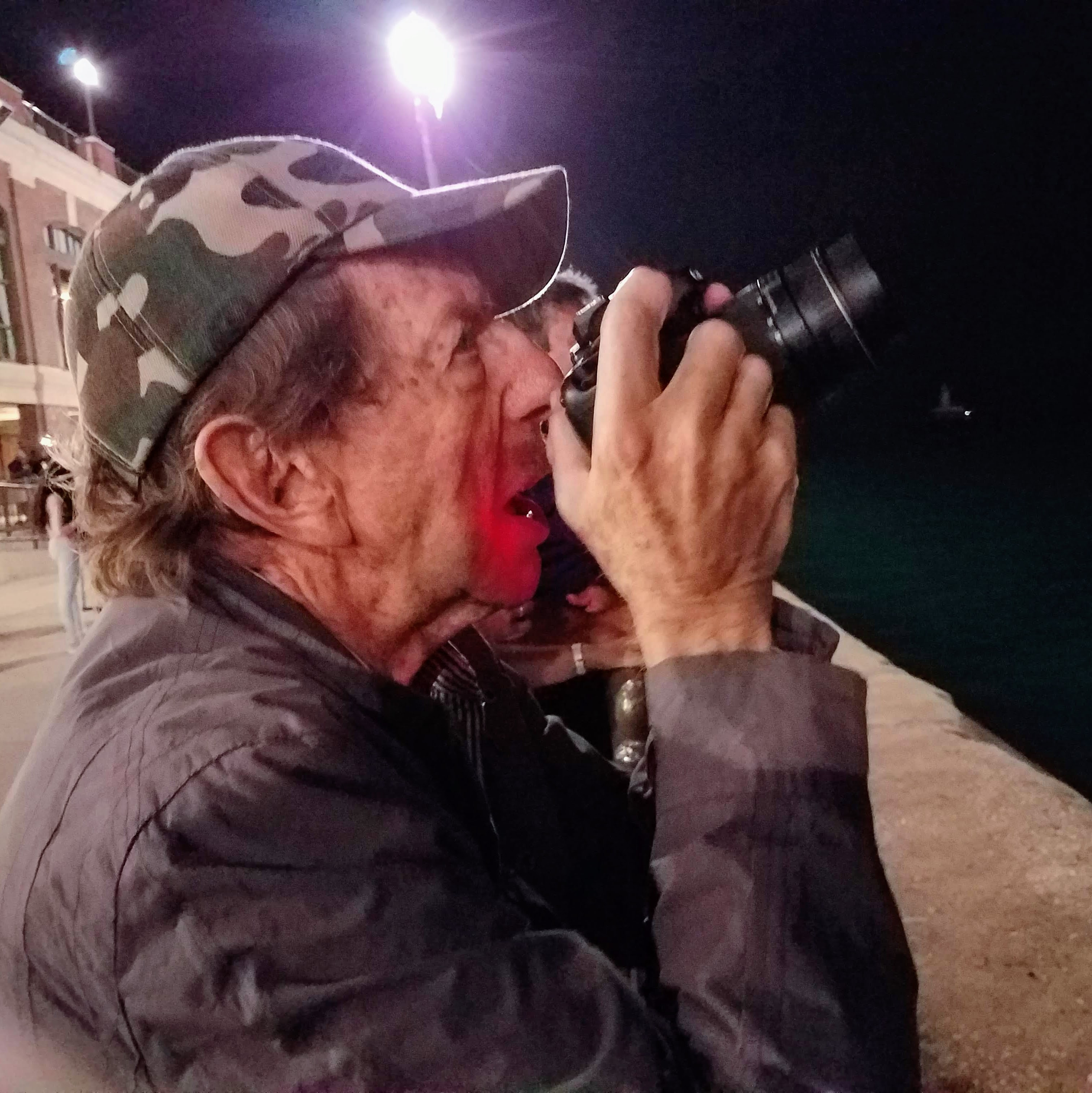
- Migdoll in 2018
- Born: May 11, 1934; Jersey City, New Jersey, U.S.
- Died: April 19, 2025 (aged 90); New York City, U.S.
- Education: New York University; MIT; Pratt Institute; Cooper Union
- Known for: Photography; Painting; Graphic design
- Notable work: Dancers Dancing; Swimmer300
- Awards: Adolph Gottlieb Painting Award; 2005 Vogelstien Painting Award; 1989; NEA; 1980 Fulbright; 1968

Herbert Migdoll (May 11, 1934 – April 19, 2025) was an American painter, environmental installation artist and photographer who most notably served as the company photographer for The Joffrey Ballet, and later its design director, from 1968 to 2016. His work has been featured on the covers of LIFE, TIME, New York Times Magazine, Horizon, Saturday Review, Show Magazine, Cue, USIA's America Magazine, and Dance Magazine. He is the author of the pictorial book Dancers Dancing. His work may be found in the collection of New York's Museum of Modern Art.

== Life and career ==
Migdoll was born on May 11, 1934, in Jersey City, New Jersey. He attended the Pratt Institute, studying under Sibyl Moholy-Nagy, before transferring to Cooper Union, graduating in 1957. Additionally, he pursued undergraduate coursework at NYU and MIT. He was granted a Fulbright scholarship in 1968 for photography research in Denmark.

He was Art Director of Dance Magazine for 25 years. Migdoll died in the Bronx on April 19, 2025, at the age of 90.
