= After Dark (magazine) =

American performing arts trade magazine (1968–1983)

- Actor Nicholas Cortland on the March 1972 cover
- Categories: Performing arts trades
- Frequency: Monthly
- First issue: May 1968
- Final issue: January 1983
- Company: Dance Magazine, Inc. Danad Publishing Company, Inc.
- Country: United States
- Based in: New York City
- Language: English
- ISSN: 0002-0702

After Dark was an entertainment magazine that covered theatre, cinema, stage plays, ballet, performance art, and various artists, including singers, actors and actresses, and dancers. First published in May 1968, the magazine succeeded Ballroom Dance Magazine.

In the late 1970s Patrick Pacheco assumed the editorship from William Como and strove for a time to make the magazine a more serious critical monthly with a greater emphasis on quality writing, abandoning color printing inside and reducing photos to a few inches square. This was a reaction to William Como's "eye-candy" thrust, but sales were low and in 1981 Louis Miele replaced Pacheco at the helm and returned the magazine to the full-color format with plenty of skin on show.

It seemed however that the day was done for After Dark, perhaps because several newer magazines were doing a better and more explicitly targeted job of appealing to the magazine's original readership, and as such Miele's incarnation of After Dark folded after only a couple of years, this time permanently.

The first issue does not say "Volume 1, no. 1", it says "Volume 10, no. 1". This numbering continues through volume 13, no. 8, Dec. 1970, which is followed by volume 3, no. 9, Jan. 1971. (Volume 3 is thus actually the fourth volume.)

== Background ==
After Dark, founded by its first editor, William Como and Rudolph Orthwine (both of Dance Magazine), covered a wide range of entertainment- or lifestyle-related topics. In addition to numerous articles on dance, topics ranged from a review of the stage production of the musical Hair in the December 1968 issue and an article on Shirley Bassey in the January 1972 issue, to a cover photograph and feature article on Donna Summer in the April 1977 issue.

Other cover photos included Bette Midler (January 1973), Robert Redford (December 1973), Barbra Streisand (April 1975), Lauren Hutton (December 1976), Mae West (May 1977), Peter Allen (February 1978), Dolly Parton (April 1978), Jon Voight (April 1979), Christopher Reeve (October 1980), Lily Tomlin (February 1981), and Diana Ross (May 1981). Best sold issue was the February 1976 Issue with Zarko Halmic, Bonita George and Bo van den Assum on the cover.

The May 1979 issue contained a profile of actor Philip Anglim, who originated the role on Broadway of John Merrick in The Elephant Man, a play by Bernard Pomerance. Two other profiles in that issue were of James Mason, the actor who was nominated for an Academy Award for his role as the husband of Judy Garland in the film A Star Is Born and Marilyn Hassett, who portrayed Jill Kinmont in The Other Side of the Mountain, a film about skier Kinmont's accident that left her paralyzed. In 1981 Lee Swanson and Louis Miele became co-publishers with their first issue being in May 1981 with Diana Ross on the cover. Swanson & Miele published the magazine from the Flatiron Building in New York before moving it to Los Angeles. Swanson died of AIDS in 1984 at the age of 53. Ownership of the magazine was left to business manager Paul Lafayette of Stamford, Connecticut. Issues regularly contained features on fashion; at times articles were about men's fashion exclusively. The "Cityscapes" section contained brief articles about then-current items of note in various cities or other geographical areas worldwide.

== Advertising ==
For its advertising space promotion in the February 1977 issue of the magazine, After Dark touted,

Reach the Audience with Money to Spare. You'll find them in After Dark! They're affluent, successful and single. With no strings to tie them down. And the time and money to live it up, any chance they get.

Their profile of their readers stated that 85.2% of their readers were single, were a median age of 33.7, and had a median income of US$20,882 (equivalent to $110,946 in 2025). They were "upscale", with 75.8% holding managerial or professional positions, well-groomed—76.4% used cologne—and spent US$804 (equivalent to $4,272 in 2025) a year on clothing. Their readers were "Travel Minded": taking a median 3.5 vacations per year with 56.6% owning valid passports; and "Bon Vivant": 81.6% regularly drinking vodka, 81.3% scotch, 70.3% gin, 63.5% champagne.

The magazine contained substantial advertising for gay restaurants, accommodations, nightclubs, bathhouses, guides, books, pornographic movies, and other products. Some of the advertising was not overtly gay; however, much of the advertising was for establishments or products that were well known to gay men, or contained symbols often used to identify gay-oriented material, such as the Greek letter lambda. There was also an abundance of advertising for men's boutiques and clothing companies, especially those—such as International Male, for example—that offered skimpy men's underwear or swimwear.

Advertising for other products or services for gay men was explicit; for example, the ads for Hand in Hand Video, a gay pornography studio; The David Kopay Story, regarding former professional football player David Kopay's homosexuality; and an ad for books by noted gay author Paul Monette, The Gold Diggers (containing the tag line, "Glittering, Glamorous, Gay"), and Lovers: The Story of Two Men, by Michael Denneny, described in the ad as "A poignantly true love story, with photographs".

The May 1979 issue included an ad for an organization simply identified as "GSF" titled, "No Man Should Be Without A Man!", which stated, "If you would like to meet warm, sincere gay men (and women) who are interesting in forming...relationships then it's time you find out about GSF." The issue also included an ad in its "After Dark Classified" ads for a "Gay Astrologer".

Other advertising was obviously intended for adult readers as well, presumably those with open minds. The February 1977 issue contained a half-page ad for the Harry Reems Legal Defense Fund. The ad appealed for funds for Reems' defense in two separate lawsuits for his participation in the pornographic films Deep Throat and The Devil in Miss Jones.

== Gay interest ==
Arnold Schwarzenegger, "Musclebound for Glory", After Dark, February 1977

Daniel Harris describes the founding of After Dark as

One of the strangest reincarnations in journalistic history. Catering to musically inclined blue-haired old ladies and golfers in Hush Puppies, Ballroom Dance Magazine was a recreational journal for the geriatric set. It was out of the ashes of a periodical devoted to such topics as waltzes, rumbas, and turkey trots that After Dark, an audacious mass-market experiment in gay eroticism, arose like a phoenix in all of its subversive splendor.

Although not described as a "gay magazine", After Dark regularly covered topics of interest to the gay community. Cal Culver, better known as the gay porn star Casey Donovan, appeared on the cover of the December 1972 issue. The February 1975 issue included a photographic portfolio of the gay porn star Peter Berlin. At its height, the magazine had more than 300,000 readers, "composed almost exclusively of gay men," according to Daniel Harris.

The May 1979 issue included a feature article on the G.G. Barnum's Room, a New York City alternative nightclub catering to a gay and transvestite clientele. The feature article included information about the evolution / genesis of the club and the makeup of its then-current customers. The feature also contained a tandem piece on rollerskating disco, "Boogie on Wheels".

The magazine publishers acknowledged the magazine's appeal to the gay community, noting that the magazine "had gotten a following in the homosexual community seven or eight years before any of the current homosexual magazines came on the market."

Donald Embinder, a former advertising salesman for After Dark, went on to found Blueboy, an upscale adult magazine which has been called the gay answer to such straight titles as Playboy and Penthouse.

== Erotic content ==
The magazine, intentionally or not, provided a level of homoeroticism by regularly using images of nude or partially nude men for its cover and article illustrations. Although some illustrations of partially clad or nude women were included at times, males comprised the majority of the subjects. Some of the illustrations related directly to the subject of the article, but others seemed to be used just for their nudity or partial nudity.

A feature article in the February 1977 issue, "Musclebound for Glory", contained photos of bodybuilders, thus relating the illustrations directly to the topic of the article. Arnold Schwarzenegger was the cover model for that issue and several photographs of him were used as illustrations in the article. In two photographs, he appears in the nude; one photograph shows part of his penis. The feature is an in-depth look at bodybuilding as "one of the most fascinating (and least explored) subcultures in America." Illustrated with pictures of barely clothed bodybuilders, the article, intentionally or not, evokes homoeroticism.

One photograph in that issue that seems to use gratuitous nudity is one of actor Paul Charles, performing the role of "Mark" on Broadway in the musical A Chorus Line. The illustration is one of several for an article about current events on Broadway, and consists of a narrative text as well as photographs of performers with brief summaries of their productions in the captions of the photos. Charles is photographed nude with a fur coat strategically draped over one shoulder that just covers his groin.

== Celebrities on the cover ==
- Ann-Margret (August 1977 and December 1981)
- Peter Allen (February 1978)
- Lucille Ball (October 1973)
- Jim Bailey (January 1972)
- Mikhail Baryshnikov (July 1977 and April 1980)
- Toni Basil (September 1974)
- Jacqueline Bisset (October 1978)
- Karen Black (March 1975)
- Joseph Bottoms (November 1978)
- David Bowie (October 1972)
- Deborah Burrell (January 1982) (Note: Burrell, Devine, and Ralph appeared on the January 1982 cover together.)
- Richard Burton (August 1980)
- Maria Callas (October 1969)
- Maxwell Caulfield (September 1982)
- Cher (February 1979)
- Dennis Cole (June 1972)
- Dorothy Collins and Ruby Keeler (May 1972)
- Robin Cousins (January 1983)
- Joan Crawford (March 1978)
- Imogen Cunningham (August 1974)
- Merce Cunningham (January 1979)
- Roger Daltrey (February 1975)
- Tony Danza (September 1980)
- Candy Darling (September 1972)
- Joe Dallesandro (January 1969 and May 1974)
- Brad Davis (May 1980)
- Carmen de Lavallade (January 1970)
- Loretta Devine (January 1982)
- Jorge Donn (August 1972)
- Keir Dullea (September 1970)
- Harvey Evans (October 1971)
- Louis Falco and William Katt (December 1969)
- James Faulkner (October 1975)
- Peter Firth (November 1977)
- Jane Fonda and John Phillip Law (August 1968)
- Jane Forth (April 1970)
- Helen Gallagher and Bobby Van (March 1971)
- Richard Gere (September 1978)
- Giancarlo Giannini (April 1976)
- Andy Gibb (May 1979)
- Dana Gillespie (July 1975)
- Murray Head and Sue Jones (June 1973)
- Tab Hunter (August 1976)
- William Hurt (January 1981)
- Lauren Hutton (December 1976)
- Elton John (March 1976)
- Grace Jones (December 1977)
- Tommy Lee Jones (March 1979)
- Norma Kamali (June 1977)
- Gary Karr (May 1975)
- Hiram Keller and Emmaretta Marks (November 1969)
- Sally Kellerman and Kevin Kline (September 1980)
- Perry King (January 1977)
- Labelle (September 1976)
- Angela Lansbury (May 1969 and January 1980)
- Peggy Lee (June 1974)
- Lotte Lenya (July 1969)
- Tom Ligon (September 1971)
- Patti LuPone (September 1979)
- Barry Manilow (June 1976)
- Donna McKechnie (August 1975)
- Rod McKuen (April 1972)
- Bette Midler (May 1971, January 1973, and May 1978)
- Sylvia Miles (October 1970)
- Liza Minnelli (April 1980)
- Marilyn Monroe (September 1981)
- Melba Moore (August 1970)
- Paul Newman (March 1981)
- Nick Nolte (February 1980)
- Rudolf Nureyev (May 1973, May 1976 and October 1977)
- Dolly Parton (Apri 1978 and July 1981)
- Bernadette Peters (February 1969)
- Michelle Phillips (October 1977)
- Sheryl Lee Ralph (January 1982)
- Robert Redford (December 1973 and December 1975)
- Vanessa Redgrave (Note: Victor Skrebneski's 1966 iconic photograph used to promote Redgrave's 1968 film Isadora) (December 1968)
- Oliver Reed (March 1970)
- Christopher Reeve (October 1980)
- Burt Reynolds (July 1978)
- Chita Rivera (November 1976)
- Diana Ross (May 1981)
- Paul Ryan Rudd (January 1976)
- John Savage (November 1979)
- Helen Schneider (September 1977)
- Arnold Schwarzenegger (February 1977)
- Carly Simon (November 1980)
- Grace Slick (April 1972)
- Alexis Smith (February 1972)
- Norman Snow (November 1975)
- Barbra Streisand (April 1975)
- Donna Summer (April 1977)
- Ernest Thompson (March 1977)
- Lily Tomlin (February 1981)
- John Travolta (June 1980)
- Monique van Vooren (May 1974)
- Cherry Vanilla (March 1980)
- Gwen Verdon (June 1975)
- Jan-Michael Vincent (January 1975 and August 1978)
- Jon Voight (June 1979)
- David Wall (October 1974)
- Simon Ward (November 1972)
- Raquel Welch (November 1974)
- Mae West (May 1977)
- Leonard Whiting (May 1973)
- Treat Williams (October 1981)
- Natalie Wood (October 1979)
- Michael York (July 1976)
