= Jack Mitchell (photographer) =

American photographer (1925–2013)

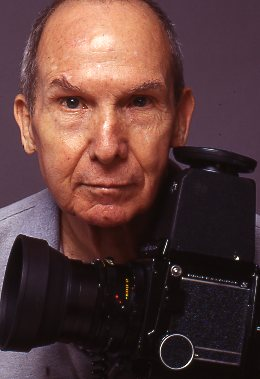
- Self portrait
- Born: September 13, 1925; Key West, Florida, U.S.
- Died: November 7, 2013 (aged 88); New Smyrna Beach, Florida, U.S.
- Occupation: Photographer
- Website: jackmitchellphotographer.com

Jack Mitchell (September 13, 1925 – November 7, 2013) was an American photographer. He photographed American artists, dancers, film and theatre performers, musicians and writers. His portraiture, lighting skill, and ability to capture dancers in what he termed "moving stills" made him one of the most important dance photographers of the 20th century.

He photographed the Alvin Ailey American Dance Theater for three decades, producing a body of work that includes over ten thousand images. He was the official photographer of the American Ballet Theatre for a decade and also photographed dancers for other top ballet companies in the US and Canada.

His work appeared in major newspapers and on the cover of major magazines, including over 160 covers of Dance Magazine. Arts Magazine called him the first photographer to treat creative individuals as characters outside of their works. Smithsonian called him the benchmark by which other dance photographers assessed their own work.

== Early life ==
Mitchell was born in Key West in 1925, and he was raised there and in New Smyrna Beach, Florida, where his family moved in 1931. His father worked for the railroad. He became interested in photography, and when he was twelve his parents bought him a Kodak Baby Brownie for $54.

== Career ==
By age 15 he had met Florida's licensing standards to obtain a press pass, by age 16 he was working as a commercial photographer, and his first published photograph was of Veronica Lake, who was visiting Florida while on a war bonds tour.

Mitchell was an Army photographer during World War II, working in Italy. In 1946, after returning home from the army, he set up his first studio in New Smyrna Beach.

In 1949, when he was 24, at the invitation of Ted Shawn, he visited Jacob's Pillow Dance and became interested in dance photography, which became a specialty. He moved his studio to New York City in 1950. He was the American Ballet Theatre's official photographer. Starting in the 1961 he spent decades photographing the Alvin Ailey American Dance Theater, producing over 10,000 images of the company; Ailey's biographer Jennifer Dunning credited Mitchell's work for "help[ing] to sell the company early on". Mitchell also photographed dancers of the Boston Ballet, Les Grands Ballets Canadiens, Pennsylvania Ballet, Houston Ballet, and San Francisco Ballet.

Mitchell shot over 160 covers for Dance Magazine; his 168th cover was published in July 2003. His term for what he was attempting to capture with dance photography was "moving stills." He was known as a lighting expert.

Mitchell also photographed other artists, entertainers, musicians, and writers, including John Lennon and Yoko Ono just a month before Lennon was murdered. Other subjects included Leonard Bernstein, David Byrne, Truman Capote, Anthony Quinn, Jack Nicholson, Patti LuPone, Keith Haring, Neil Simon, Angela Lansbury, Whitney Houston, Twyla Tharp, Ned Rorem, Leontyne Price, Alfred Hitchcock, Spalding Gray, Ann Reinking, Andy Warhol, and Natalie Wood. He spent a decade photographing Gloria Swanson. His work appeared in The New York Times, Elle, Harper's Bazaar, Life, Newsweek, People, Rolling Stone, Time, Vanity Fair and Vogue, among others.

Mitchell was the subject of a 2006 documentary, My Life is Black and White, directed by Craig Highberger. His books include Icons & Idols (1998), for which Edward Albee wrote the foreword, and a book of his Alvin Ailey photography, Alvin Ailey American Dance Theater (1993). In 2020 his 1983 photo of Audre Lorde was used by mosaicist Rico Gatson to create a permanent installation at the 167th Street Station in the Bronx.

== Recognition ==
Arts Magazine credited him as the first photographer to treat entertainers as individuals with "character and identification not expressed exclusively through their works." The Smithsonian, which holds The Jack Mitchell Photography of the Alvin Ailey American Dance Theater Collection, including 8,288 black-and-white negatives, 2,106 color slides and transparencies, and 339 black-and-white prints, called him "the benchmark and standard that other dance photographers measured their work". The New York Times, which published hundreds of his photographs, described him as "both a portraitist and a capturer of complex motion" and as a lighting expert.

== Personal life ==
Mitchell retired in 1995 and moved from New York City back to New Smyrna Beach. His partner, Robert Plavik, died in 2009. Mitchell died in 2013 at his home in New Smyrna Beach, Florida.

== Gallery ==
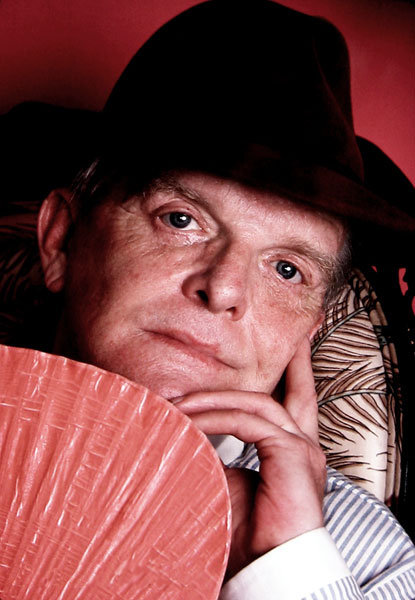
Truman Capote, 1980

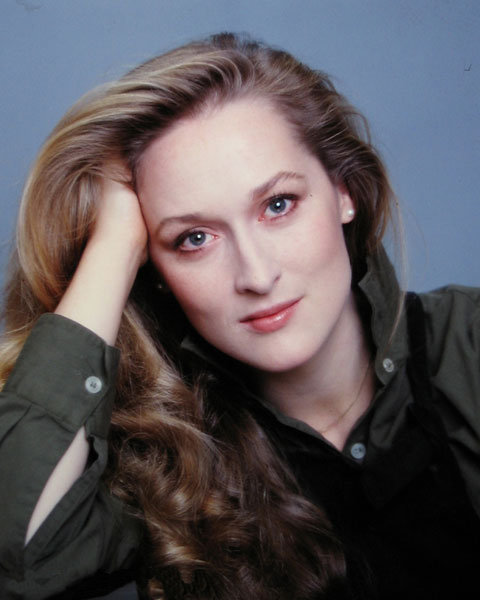
Meryl Streep, 1977

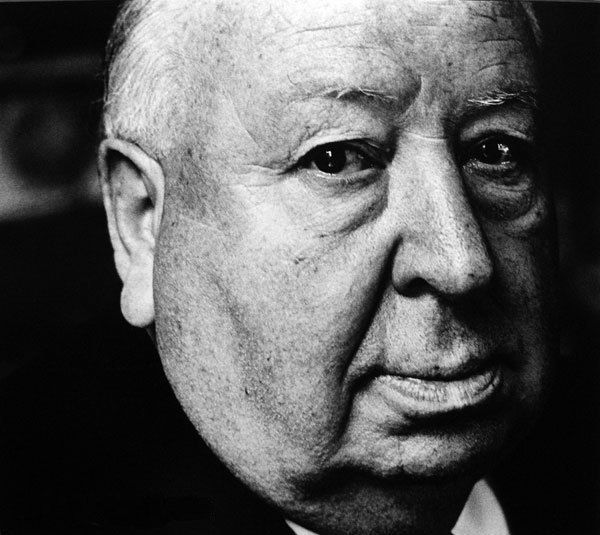
Alfred Hitchcock, c. 1972

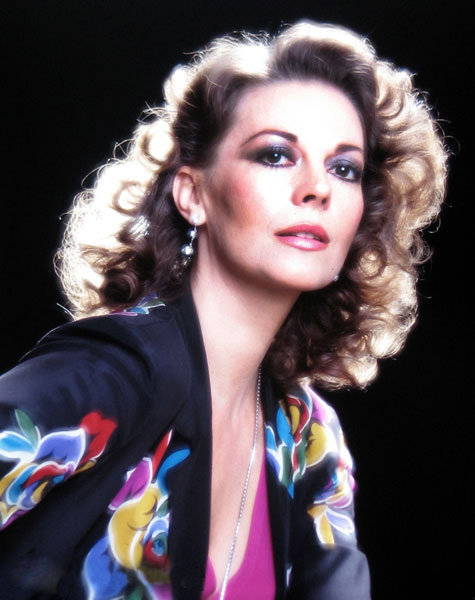
Natalie Wood, 1979

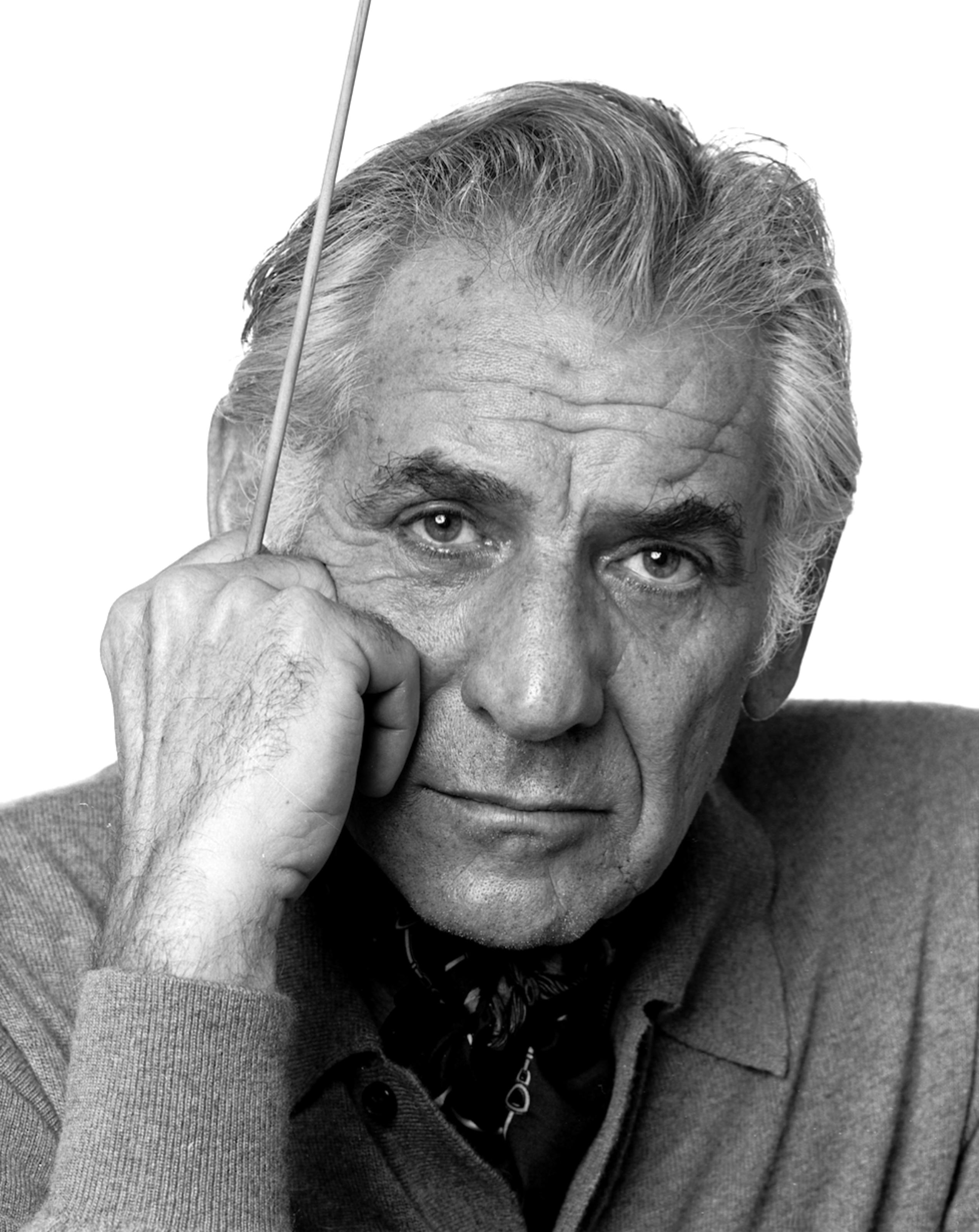
Leonard Bernstein, 1977

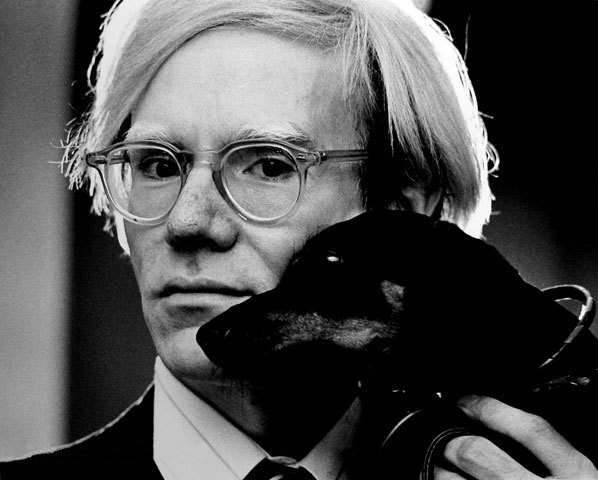
Andy Warhol and Archie, 1973

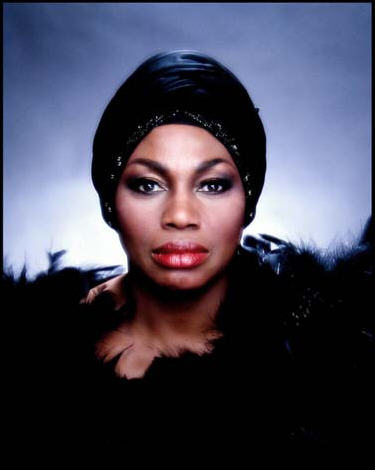
Leontyne Price, 1981

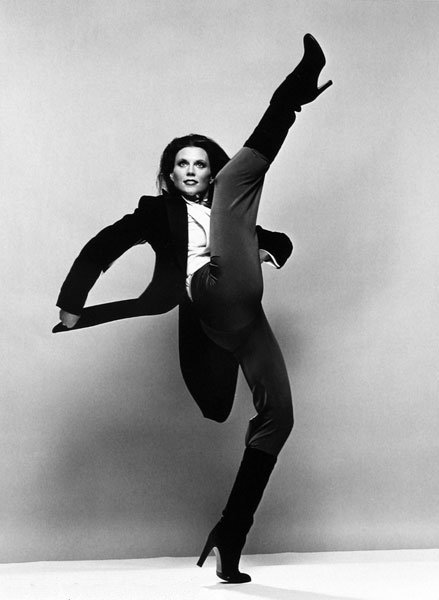
Ann Reinking, 1981

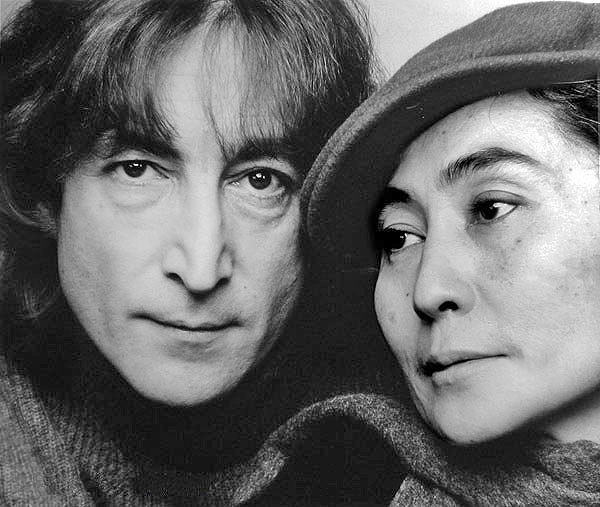
John Lennon and Yoko Ono, 1980
