= Antonio Lopez (illustrator) =

Puerto Rican fashion illustrator

- Born: February 11, 1943; Utuado, Puerto Rico
- Died: March 17, 1987 (aged 44); Los Angeles, California, U.S.
- Known for: Illustration

Antonio Lopez (February 11, 1943 – March 17, 1987) was a Puerto Rican fashion illustrator whose work appeared in such publications as Vogue, Harper's Bazaar, Elle, Interview and The New York Times. Several books collecting his illustrations have been published. In his obituary, the New York Times called him a "major fashion illustrator." He generally signed his works as "Antonio."

== Biography ==
Antonio Lopez was born in Utuado, Puerto Rico. When he was seven years old, his family moved to New York City. His parents, Maria Luisa Cruz and Francisco Lopez influenced him to apply his artistic talents to fashion. He attended the Traphagen School of Fashion, the High School of Art and Design, and the Fashion Institute of Technology (FIT). Lopez graduated from Traphagen School of Fashion in 1955 in Illustration.

While attending F.I.T. as a student in 1962, he began an internship at Women's Wear Daily which led to him leaving school and working at the publication. Shortly afterward he left for a freelance position at the New York Times. He also did illustrations of fashion designs by Charles James. Lopez worked in close collaboration with Juan Eugene Ramos, and for a few years they were romantic partners.

His circle of friends also included photographer Bill Cunningham. Around 1966, Lopez introduced him to photographer David Montgomery, who gave Cunningham his first camera. In 1969 he moved to Paris along with Ramos and was an associate of Karl Lagerfeld; he stayed there until the mid-1970s.

Lopez and pop artist Andy Warhol were collaborators; Lopez was the in-house designer for Warhol's Interview magazine for several years, and they created a special Puerto Rico edition in February 1975.

Lopez was known for discovering talented young models who would become his muses, often referred to as “Antonio’s Girls”. He discovered Warhol superstar Donna Jordan, providing an important stepping stone for her budding career. Warhol superstar Jane Forth was also his muse. Lopez discovered Jessica Lange and Jerry Hall. He and lived with Hall in Paris at the beginning of her modeling career. Lopez and Ramos also discovered Pat Cleveland, Grace Jones, and Tina Chow.

The book Antonio's Tales From the Thousand and One Nights was published in 1985. Lopez explored themes of queer desire and race in his art through cultural references to subjects, such as Josephine Baker and The Wild One.

Lopez died of Kaposi's Sarcoma as a complication of AIDS at UCLA Medical Center on March 17, 1987. He was living in New York but was in Los Angeles for an exhibition of his art at Robert Berman Gallery in Santa Monica; he was attended by his friend and model Susan Baraz.

His collaborator Juan Eugene Ramos survived until 1995, when he also died of AIDS.

== Influence and legacy ==
Painter Paul Caranicas is president of the Antonio Lopez Foundation. The organization Focus on AIDS, which raises funds for AIDS research, care and education through photography auctions was founded in 1987 by Baraz and Vue magazine publisher Hossein Farmani in response to Lopez' death.

The book Antonio's Tales from the Thousand & One Nights was the inspiration for Marc Jacobs' 2007 "Arabian Nights" event. It was also the inspiration to fashion designer Suneet Varma's 2010 collection "The Pirates of Couture."

Designer Hannah MacGibbon cited Lopez as an inspiration for her Fall 2009 Ready-to-Wear Collection for Chloé.

A book on the career of Antonio Lopez, Antonio Lopez: Fashion, Art, Sex, & Disco, by Roger Padilha and Mauricio Padilha (with a foreword by Andre Leon Talley and an epilogue by Anna Sui), was published by Rizzoli in September 2012.

Lopez was a major source of inspiration for fashion designer Anna Sui's Spring 2012 fashion collection.

Students at the Fashion Institute of Technology in New York City request his name at the library more than any other.

Lopez' artwork also served as a major source of inspiration in Hirohiko Araki's artwork, especially in the character designs and poses in the earlier parts of Jojo's Bizarre Adventure.

In 2013, MAC Cosmetics launched a campaign dedicated to Lopez. The ads for the campaign featured his muses Marisa Berenson, Pat Cleveland, and Jerry Hall.

=== Exhibitions ===
Lopez' art and photography were exhibited at Staley-Wise Gallery in New York in March–April 2000.

Lopez' work was included in April 2009 exhibit "The Line of Fashion", curated by Robert Richards at the Society of Illustrators in association with the Leslie Lohman Gay Art Foundation.

His work is also included in the exhibit "Drawing Fashion" at the Design Museum in London, England, running November 17, 2010- March 6, 2011.

In June 2016, the exhibit Antonio Lopez: Future Funk Fashion opened at El Museo del Barrio in New York City.

== Books ==
- Lopez, Antonio; Hemphill, Christopher; Ramos, Juan; Amiel, Karen. Antonio's Girls (Thames and Hudson, 1982) ISBN 978-0-500-27265-7
- Burton, Richard; Lopez, Antonio; Finamore, Roy. Antonio's Tales from the Thousand & One Nights (Stewart, Tabori & Chang, 1985) ISBN 978-0-941434-77-5
- Lopez, Antonio; Ramos, Juan Eugene. Antonio, 60, 70, 80: three decades in style (Munich: Schirmer/Mosel, 1995) ISBN 978-3-88814-759-3
- Caranicas, Paul; Lopez, Antonio. Antonio's people (Thames & Hudson, 2004) ISBN 978-0-500-28502-2
- Lopez, Antonio. Instamatics (Santa Fe: Twin Palms Publishers, 2011) ISBN 978-1-931885-94-2 Includes an interview of Antonio Lopez with Michael McKenzie, June 28, 1976
- Padilha, Roger; Padilha, Mauricio. Antonio Lopez: Fashion, Art, Sex, and Disco (Rizzoli, 2012) ISBN 978-0-8478-3792-2

== Films ==
- Antonio Lopez 1970: Sex Fashion & Disco – written, produced and directed by James Crump. This feature documentary film shows Lopez and Ramos in the late 1960s and early 1970s in Paris and New York, and their colorful and sometimes outrageous milieu. Antonio Lopez 1970: Sex Fashion & Disco film features Jessica Lange, Grace Jones, Patti D'Arbanville, Jerry Hall, Karl Lagerfeld, Yves Saint Laurent, Joan Juliet Buck, Michael Chow (restaurateur), Tina Chow, Grace Coddington, Bill Cunningham (American photographer), Pat Cleveland, Bob Colacello, Jane Forth, Corey Tippin, Paul Caranicas and Donna Jordan among others.
