= Dance Magazine =

American trade publication for dance

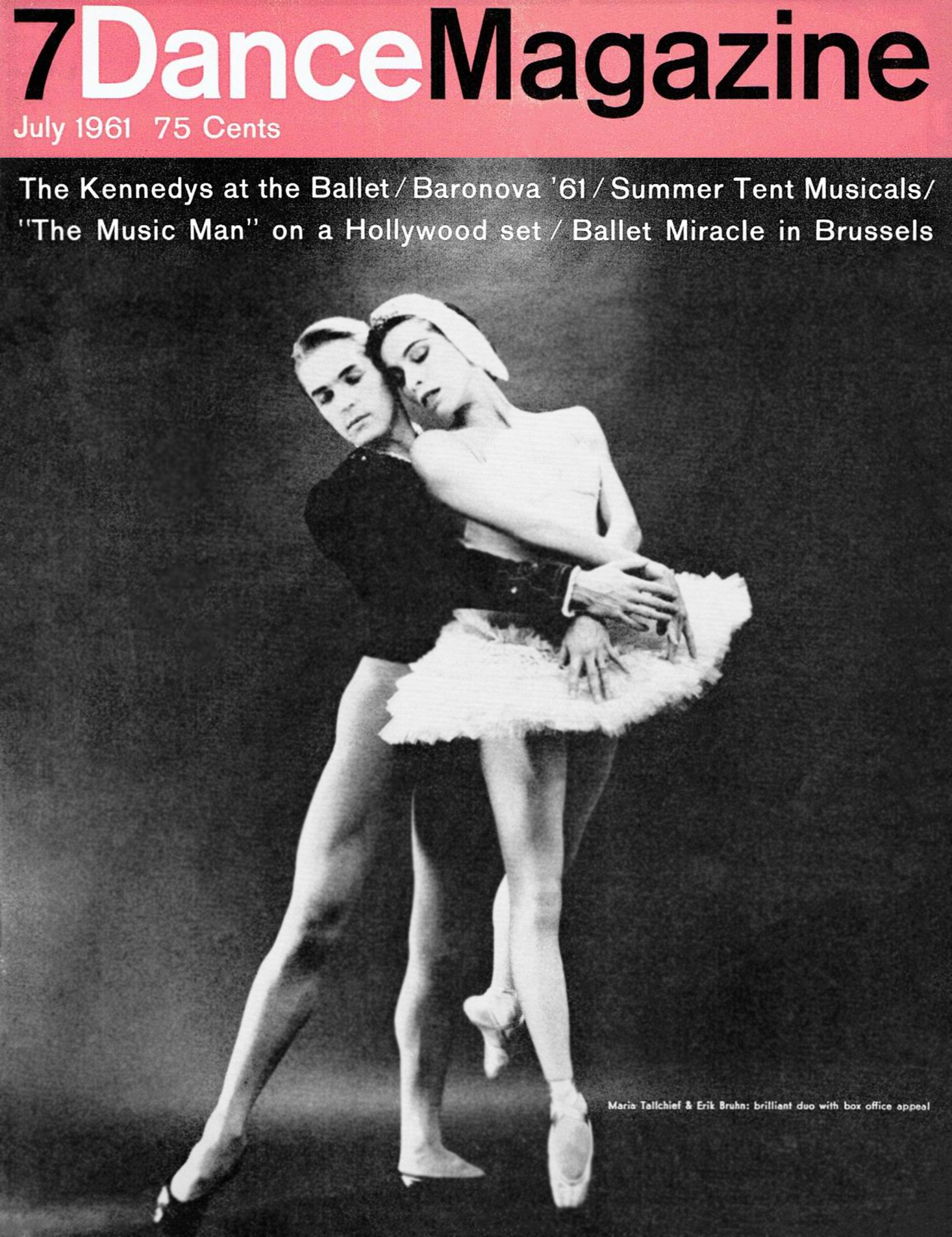
- Maria Tallchief and Erik Bruhn on the front cover of Dance Magazine, July 1961
- Editor-in-Chief: Caitlin Sims
- Categories: Dance
- Frequency: Monthly
- Publisher: DanceMedia
- First issue: June 1927; 99 years ago (as The American Dancer)
- Country: United States
- Based in: New York City, New York, U.S.
- Language: English
- Website: www.dancemagazine.com
- ISSN: 0011-6009

Dance Magazine is an American trade publication for dance. It was first published in June 1927 as The American Dancer. Dance Magazine is currently part of Dance Media, led by longtime arts publisher Joanna Harp as president. It also has multiple sister publications, including Pointe, Dance Spirit, Dance Teacher and The Dance Edit. Dance Magazine was owned by Macfadden Communications Group from 2001 to 2016 when it was sold to Frederic M. Seegal, an investment banker with the Peter J. Solomon Company. In 2023, Dance Magazine (as part of Dance Media) was acquired by Hollywood.com.

== Editors ==
The first editor and publisher was Ruth Eleanor Howard. Sometime in the 1930s, Paul R. Milton took over as editor. In 1942, the magazine was purchased by Rudolf Orthwine. Lydia Joel became the editor in 1952. In 1970, William Como replaced her, and he was the editor-in-chief until his death in 1989. Richard Philp was the editor-in-chief from 1989 to 1999, when the magazine was relocated to Oakland, California for several years. Janice Berman took over from Philp late in 1999, followed by KC Patrick. Wendy Perron was editor-in-chief from 2004 to 2013. Jennifer Stahl was editor-in-chief until 2022. Caitlin Sims, an associate editor of Dance Magazine from 1995 to 1999, returned as editor in 2022.

== See also ==
- Dance Magazine's "25 to Watch"
