= Judy Clark (disambiguation) =

Judy Clark (1921–2002) is an actress.

Judy or Judith Clark(e) may also refer to:

- Judy Clarke (born 1952), American criminal defense attorney
- Judy Clark (artist) (born 1949), British artist
- Judith Alice Clark (born 1949), American radical political activist
- Judith Clark (curator) (born 1967), Australian curator and professor
- Judith Clarke (1943–2020), Australian author
- Judi Brown Clarke (born 1961), American politician and former athlete
- Judy MacArthur Clark, British veterinary surgeon
