= Tina Chow =

American model, fashion icon (1950–1992)

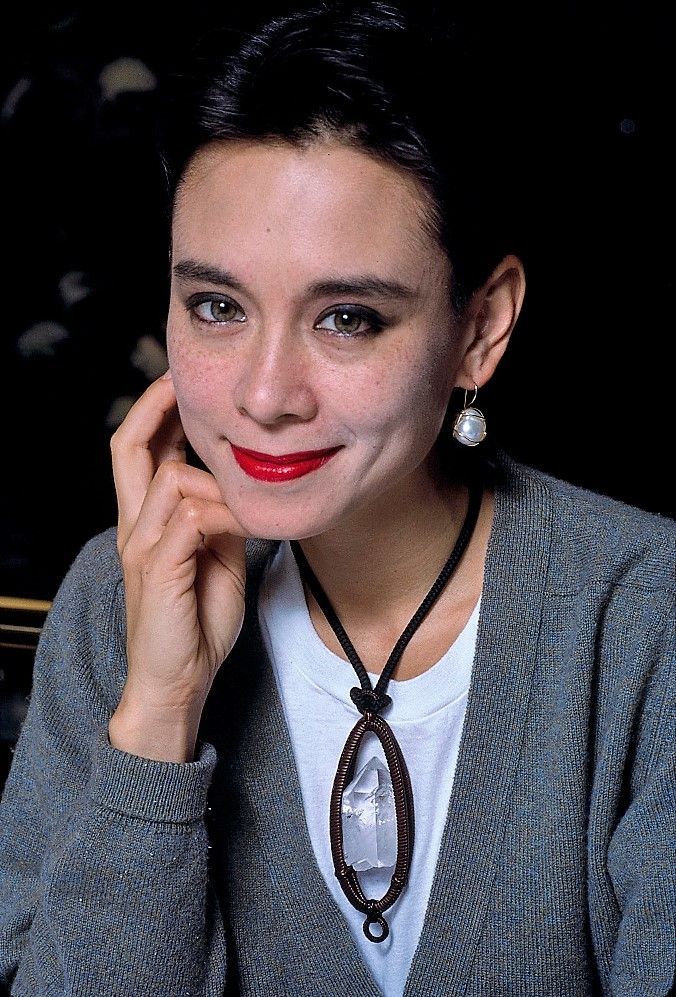
- Chow in 1987
- Born: Bettina Louise Lutz; April 18, 1950; Lakewood, Ohio, U.S.
- Died: January 24, 1992 (aged 41); Pacific Palisades, Los Angeles, California, U.S.
- Cause of death: Complications from AIDS
- Other name: Bettina L. Chow
- Education: Sophia University
- Occupations: Model, jewelry designer
- Spouse: Michael Chow (m. 1972; div. 1989)
- Children: 2, including China
- Relatives: Adelle "Bonnie" Lutz (sister)

Tina Chow (born Bettina Louise Lutz, April 18, 1950 – January 24, 1992) was an American model and jewelry designer who was considered an influential fashion icon of the 1970s and 1980s. She was the second wife of restaurateur Michael Chow, the founder and owner of the Mr Chow restaurant chain.

== Early life ==
Chow was born Bettina Louise Lutz in Lakewood, Ohio. Her mother, Mona Furuki, was Japanese. Her father, Walter Edmund Lutz (1910–2003), was an American of German descent. Walter Lutz met Mona Furuki on Christmas Day 1945, while serving with the United States Army in occupied Japan. Chow's sister is artist, designer and actress Adelle Lutz.

== Career ==
=== Modeling ===
In the mid-1960s, the family moved from Ohio to Japan, where Chow attended Sophia University. Both sisters were later discovered by a modeling agent and became the faces of Japanese cosmetic line Shiseido and featured prominently in their ad campaigns from the early 1970s. During her modeling career she was photographed by Helmut Newton, Cecil Beaton and Arthur Elgort, among others. She was drawn by illustrator Antonio Lopez and painted by Andy Warhol. She was also the muse of designers Yves St. Laurent and Issey Miyake.

Chow was cited by fashion magazines for her unique style and her collection of Mariano Fortuny dresses. She routinely paired inexpensive items with high fashion pieces and mixed feminine and masculine styles simultaneously. Chow was also noted for her androgynous Eton crop hairstyle which she had cut at a New York barbershop and styled with Dippity Do. In 1985, she was named on the International Best Dressed List.

=== Jewelry designing ===
In the late 1980s, Tina Chow designed and produced several collections of jewelry. Using rock crystal, gold, silver, wood, bamboo, and silk cording. In 1987, the first collection was sold at Bergdorf Goodman in New York, Maxfield's in Los Angeles, at Ultimo in Chicago, and from 1988 at Gallerie Naila Monbrison in Paris. Perhaps one of the best known pieces in the collection is the "Kyoto Bracelet," which is a woven bamboo bangle which encases seven rough rock crystals or rose quartz in their natural form. The crystals, left loose inside the bamboo casing, rattle around as the wearer moves about. For the bamboo wrapping and basketry work in the collection Chow enlisted Kosuge Shochikudo, one of Japan's master craftsmen in the art of bamboo. In April 1988, designer Calvin Klein accessorized the showing of his Fall/Winter 1988/89 collection with Chow's jewelry.

== Personal life ==
In 1973, Tina married Michael Chow, who owns the Mr. Chow restaurant chain. The Chows had two children including China. The couple divorced in November 1989.

== Later years and death ==
After her marriage to Michael Chow ended, Tina Chow began to drift away from the party lifestyle for which the couple had become known. She became an AIDS activist after having lost many friends to the disease.

In June 1989, Chow was diagnosed with AIDS. She had contracted HIV in late 1985 through an affair with French aristocrat Kim d'Estainville, who died of AIDS in January 1990. She made her diagnosis public in an effort to educate others and continued working as an AIDS activist and with AIDS charities, including Project Angel Food. Chow continued designing jewelry.

Chow moved to California, where she chose to treat her illness with meditation and a macrobiotic diet. On January 24, 1992, she died of complications from AIDS at her home in Pacific Palisades at the age of 41.
