= Judith Clark (curator) =

Art director (born 1967)

- Born: 18 October 1967 (age 58); Rome, Italy
- Education: St Georges English School, Rome; Bartlett School of Architecture (UCL), Architectural Association, Warburg Institute (MA), City & Guilds of London Art School (Fellowship)
- Occupation: Exhibition Maker/Art Director
- Website: judithclarkstudio.com

Judith Clark (born 1967) is an exhibition-maker and art director living in London. Clark is Professor of Fashion and Museology at University of the Arts London in London and Co-Director (with Amy de la Haye) of the Centre for Fashion Curation (London College of Fashion). She is visiting professor at Università Iuav di Venezia (IUAV), Venice, and Associate Fellow at City and Guilds of London Art School.

== Early life and education ==
Judith Clark was born in Rome, Italy. Clark moved to London to study architecture at the Bartlett School of Architecture (University College London) and the Architectural Association. She holds an MA in Cultural and Intellectual History 1300–1650 from the Warburg Institute, School of Advanced Studies. Clark is a visiting fellow on the City and Guilds of London Art School.

Since 2006, Clark has credited Aby Warburg as a major influence on her work. References from the Warburg Archive have been the starting point for Clark's more recent artworks, including an ongoing series based on the Judgement of Paris. The first artworks were shown at Atelier Amden in 2018 which were turned into a short film in 2020.

Judith Clark and filmmaker James Norton made 'Satin Cages' a film of a hypothetical exhibition of crinolines (based on a balsa wood model made by Clark) for an exhibition at the Architecture Foundation in 1996. She collaborated again with Norton on 1914 Now and a series of Instagram films for Lanvin during lockdown.

Clark is co-director of the Centre for Fashion Curation with Amy de la Haye. In 2014 they wrote 'Exhibiting Fashion: Before and After 1971' published by Yale University Press. The book is an extended look at the V&A Exhibition: 'Fashion: An Anthology By Cecil Beaton'. Clark teaches on the 'Past and Future of Fashion Curation' Unit on the MA Fashion Curation and Cultural Programming programme at LCF.

== Career ==
Judith Clark is mainly associated with curating and designing exhibitions of fashion, working alongside brand archives. Harold Koda, the curator in charge of the Costume Institute at the Metropolitan Museum of Art in New York from 2000-2015, said that Judith Clark's curatorial approach "challenged assumptions about what an exhibition on dress might be." He said:

In each of her exhibitions, there is a strong sense of the peculiarities of space, the organization of circulation patterns to underscore a narrative or ideas, and the establishment of the novel relationship of an object to the viewer.

— Harold Koda

She opened Judith Clark Costume Gallery in Notting Hill in 1997, which staged twenty-one exhibitions. Exhibitions included Alexander McQueen, Pablo and Delia (Delia Cancela & Pablo Mesejean), Adelle Lutz, Vionnet, and Hussein Chalayan.

In 2002, Clark joined the Victoria & Albert Museum Research Department for a three-year fellowship. Her first museum based exhibition was 'Spectres: When Fashion Turns Back', a collaboration with ModeMuseum Antwerpen in Antwerp which in 2005 travelled back to the V&A.

Clark's 'Anna Piaggi Fashion-ology' was the first exhibition to celebrate a stylist at the V&A and the first exhibition on the work of the Italian stylist and journalist. Clark often cites Anna Piaggi and her Doppie Pagine with Luca Stoppini for Italian Vogue as a key reference. A conversation between them was published in Fashion Theory in March 2006.

'The Concise Dictionary of Dress' (with psychoanalyst Adam Phillips), commissioned by Artangel, was a series of 10 art installations designed by Clark that changed her working practice to create hybrid installations and exhibitions.

Clark has designed and curated exhibitions of fashion at various institutions, including Museum Boijmans Van Beuningen, Rotterdam; Palazzo Pitti, Florence; Palazzo Fortuny, Venice; Palais de Tokyo, Paris; Simone Handbag Museum, Seoul. In 2012, Clark created a permanent display of Frida Kahlo's dresses at her home in Mexico City.

'The Vulgar: Fashion Re-defined' (also with Adam Phillips), was commissioned and hosted by the Barbican Art Gallery in 2016 before it travelled to the Winter Palace of Prince Eugene in Vienna, and ModeMuseum Antwerpen, Hasselt.

== Collaborations and commissions ==
Judith Clark has collaborated with: Stephen Jones; Jorge Otero-Pailos, Jennifer Higgie, Mat Collishaw, Charlie Smith Design, John Morgan Studio, Leanne Shapton; Adelle Lutz, Adam Phillips, Hussein Chalayan, Simon Thorogood, Ruben Toledo; Dai Rees, Yuri Avvakumov; Angelo Seminara, Naomi Filmer; Julie Verhoeven, and Solange Knowles.

Organisations that have commissioned Clark include the Archives and Museum of Black Heritage (Black Cultural Archives), Artangel London, Bal Harbour Shops Miami, Barbican Art Gallery, Museum Boijmans van Beuningen Rotterdam, British Council, London and Mexico Camera Nazionale della Moda Italiana, Chloé Paris, Diana Vreeland Estate, Fosun Foundation Shanghai (The Bund Finance Center), Hayward Gallery London, IUAV Venice, Lanvin Paris, Louis Vuitton Malletier Paris, London College of Fashion, Michelangelo Foundation, ModeMuseum Antwerpen, Museo Fortuny Venice (Fortuny Museum), Frida Kahlo Museum, Museo Poldi Pezzoli Milano, Palazzo Pitti/Pitti Immagine Florence, Salvatore Ferragamo S.p.A. Firenze, Selfridges London, Simone Handbag Museum Seoul, Victoria & Albert Museum London.
