= China Chow =

English actress, model (b. 1974)

- Born: China Eiko Chow; 15 April 1974 (age 52); Southwark, London, England
- Occupations: Actress, model
- Years active: 1997–2007 (acting)
- Parents: Michael Chow (father); Tina Chow (mother)
- Relatives: Zhou Xinfang (grandfather); Tsai Chin (aunt); Adelle Lutz (aunt)

Chinese name
- Traditional Chinese: 周佳納
- Simplified Chinese: 周佳纳
Transcriptions
Standard Mandarin
- Hanyu Pinyin: Zhōu Jiānà
- Wade–Giles: Chou^{1} Chia^{1}-na^{4}
Yue: Cantonese
- Jyutping: Zau^{1} Gaai^{1}naap^{6}

China Eiko Chow (Note: In this Chinese name, the family name is Chow.) (born 15 April 1974) is a British-American actress and model.

== Early life and education ==
Chow was born in London to restaurateur Michael Chow and his wife, model/designer Tina Chow (née Lutz). Her paternal grandfather was the Peking Opera's Zhou Xinfang. Her paternal aunt is actress and former "Bond girl" Tsai Chin. Her maternal aunt is the artist Adelle Lutz. Through Lutz's 1987 marriage, her uncle is David Byrne.

Her parents left London for New York in 1980, when she was 5 years old. They then settled Los Angeles in 1985. Her mother, who was born in Ohio, was of Japanese ancestry and her father is Chinese. She has a younger brother, Maximilian (b. 1978). Her parents divorced in November 1989.

In 1992, Chow's mother Tina died of AIDS. The same year, Chow's father married Eva Chun, a Korean fashion designer. In February 2019, her father married his fourth wife, Vanessa Rano, who is 49 years his junior.

China attended the Lycée Français de Los Angeles. After graduating, she went to Boston University for two years before transferring to Scripps College in Claremont, California, where she graduated with a psychology degree in May 1997. She was the first in her family to graduate from college.

== Career ==
Chow was discovered as a prospective fashion model by Roger Museenden. She spent several years following in her mother's footsteps working as a model for Shiseido cosmetics, Tommy Hilfiger and Calvin Klein. Her modeling led to her being named one of Harper's Bazaar's "It Girls" in 1996 and an appearance in the December 1996 edition of Vogue's "The Next Best-Dressed List".

In 2000, she posed for Maxim and was featured in their gallery, Girls of Maxim. She was ranked No. 22 and No. 54 on the Maxim Hot 100 Women (2000 and 2001, respectively).

Chow made her acting debut in 1998, starring opposite Mark Wahlberg in The Big Hit. In 2004, she appeared in Frankenfish. Three years later, Chow appeared on USA Network's first season of Burn Notice. She was the host and a judge of Bravo's Work of Art: The Next Great Artist, which premiered on 9 June 2010.

Chow provided the voice of Katie Zhan in Grand Theft Auto: San Andreas.

== Personal life ==
Chow was in a relationship with actor Mark Wahlberg for four years after meeting on the set of the 1998 film The Big Hit. She was in a relationship with English actor and comedian Steve Coogan from 2007 until 2011. She has also been romantically linked to Canadian actor Keanu Reeves. Since February 2018, she has been in a relationship with English musician Billy Idol.

== Filmography ==
Year	Title	Role	Notes
1998	The Big Hit	Keiko Nishi	
2001	Head Over Heels	Lisa	
2002	That '70s Show	China	Episode: "Hyde Gets the Girl"
2002	Spun	Escort	
2003	Sol Goode	Amber Stevens	
2003	Blessings	Jennifer Foster	TV movie
2004	Frankenfish	Mary Callahan	TV movie
2004	Grand Theft Auto: San Andreas	Katie Zhan (voice)	Video game
2007	Burn Notice	Lucy Chen	2 episodes
2017	SPF-18	Producer	
