= Adam Phillips (psychologist) =

British psychotherapist (born 1954)

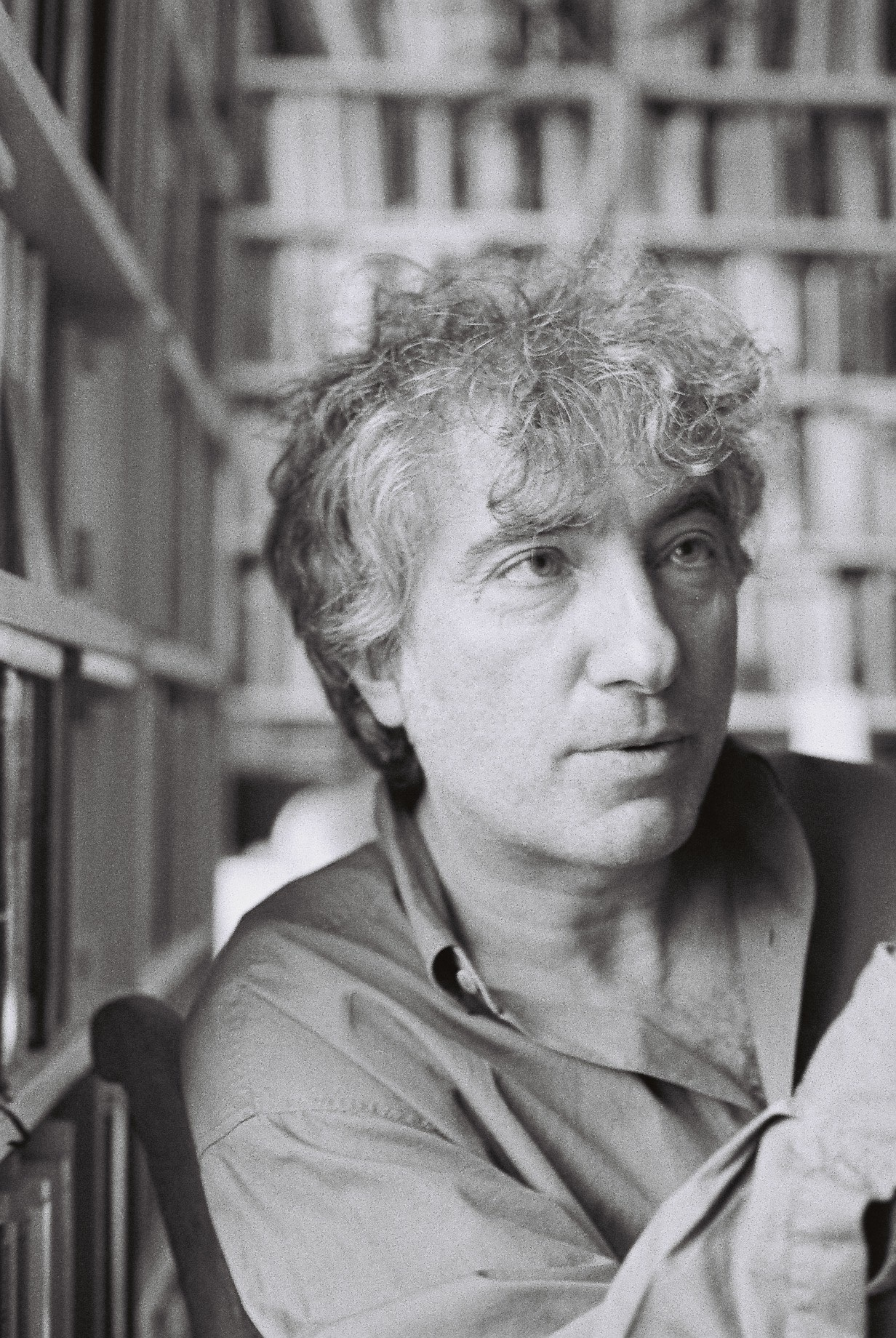
- Adam Phillips in 2012
- Born: 19 September 1954 (age 72); Cardiff, Wales
- Partner(s): Judith Clark; Jacqueline Rose (formerly)
- Children: 3
- Scientific career
- Fields: Psychoanalysis, Literary Criticism

Adam Phillips (19 September 1954) is a British psychoanalytic psychotherapist and essayist.

Since 2003, he has been the general editor of the new Penguin Modern Classics translations of Sigmund Freud. He is also a regular contributor to the London Review of Books. He is a contributor to the website EXPeditions.

Joan Acocella, writing in The New Yorker, described Phillips as "Britain's foremost psychoanalytic writer", an opinion echoed by historian Élisabeth Roudinesco in Le Monde.

== Life ==
Phillips was born in Cardiff, Wales, in 1954, the child of second-generation Polish Jews. He grew up as part of an extended family of aunts, uncles and cousins and describes his parents as "very consciously Jewish but not believing". As a child, his first interest was the study of tropical birds and it was not until adolescence that he developed an interest in literature. He was educated at Clifton College.

He went on to study English at St John's College, Oxford, graduating with a third class degree. His defining influences are literary; he was inspired to become a psychoanalyst after reading Carl Jung's autobiography and he has always believed psychoanalysis to be closer to poetry than medicine: "For me, psychoanalysis has always been of a piece with the various languages of literature—a kind of practical poetry." He began his training soon after leaving Oxford, underwent four years of analysis with Masud Khan and qualified to practice at the age of 27. He had a particular interest in children's psychological well-being and began working as a child psychotherapist: "one of the pleasures of child psychotherapy is that it is, as it were, psychoanalysis for a non-psychoanalytic audience."

From 1990 to 1997, he was principal child psychotherapist at Charing Cross Hospital in London. Phillips worked in the National Health Service for seventeen years, but became disillusioned with its tightening bureaucratic demands. He currently divides his time between writing and his private practice in Notting Hill. For a number of years, he was in a relationship with the academic Jacqueline Rose. He has been a visiting professor at the University of York English department since 2006.

Phillips was elected a Fellow of the Royal Society of Literature in 2012.

== Literary presence ==
Phillips is a regular contributor to the London Review of Books. He has been described by The Times as "the Martin Amis of British psychoanalysis" for his "brilliantly amusing and often profoundly unsettling" work, and by John Banville as "one of the finest prose stylists in the language, an Emerson of our time." His approach to the new Freud edition is consistent with his own ideas about psychoanalysis, which he considers to be a form of rhetorical persuasion. He has published essays on a variety of themes, including the work of literary figures such as Charles Lamb, Walter Savage Landor and William Empson, as well as on philosophy and psychoanalysis; he has also written Winnicott in the Fontana Modern Masters series.

In an essay for The Baffler, Sam Adler-Bell described Phillips' style as "uniformly short, allusive, and elusive, preoccupied with contradiction and wordplay" while his work is motivated by an "impulse to trouble the norms, rules, models, and expectations that make us feel stuck, unable to think, or unable to want." Adler-Bell notes that Phillips' writing reflects his psychoanalytical ideals, particularly an interest in the qualities of free association: that is, "provisionality, curiosity, promiscuity, improvisation, and play."

Phillips is deeply opposed to any attempt to defend psychoanalysis as a science or even as a field of academic study, rather than simply, as he puts it, "a set of stories about how we can nourish ourselves to keep faith with our belief in nourishment, our desire for desire"—"stories [that] will sustain our appetite, which is, by definition, our appetite for life." His influences include D. W. Winnicott, Roland Barthes, Stanley Cavell and W. H. Auden.

== Assessment ==
Phillips has been described as "perhaps the best theorist of the modes and malfunctions of modernist psychology". For his intellectual resources, Phillips "draws from philosophy, literature, politics amongst others. However, whilst this affords Phillips the opportunity to be expansive it also makes him a maverick", and others "suspicious of his work", so that he has been called "ludic and elusive and intellectually slippery." Indeed, "To his critics ... Phillips is little more than a charlatan about whom an alarming cult of personality is developing." He himself was opposed to "the idealization that is a refusal to know someone", and even in the appraisal of the psychoanalytic greats thought that alongside "thoughtful consideration ... puerile consideration would not be the end of the world", in accordance with his enduring scepticism "about psychoanalysis ... it should be the opposite, the antidote to a cult."

== On psychoanalysis ==
Phillips constantly refuses to "claim" any particular patch of psychoanalytic territory or even defend the value of psychoanalysis itself. "For me", he has said, "psychoanalysis is only one among many things you might do if you're feeling unwell—you might also try aromatherapy, knitting, hang-gliding. There are lots of things you can do with your distress. I don't believe psychoanalysis is the best thing you can do, even if I value it a great deal." He has also been alert to the possibility that "psychoanalysis ... disempowers in the name of knowing what's best ... at its worst it forces a pattern. It can make the links that should have been left to find their way." In the end, he claims, "Psychoanalysis cannot enable the patient to know what he wants, but only to risk finding out."

On psychoanalysis and science he says, "I don't think psychoanalysts should have bought into the scientific model with such eagerness. I don't think psychoanalysis is a science or should aspire to be one."

== Works ==
- Winnicott (1988)
- On Kissing, Tickling, and Being Bored: Psychoanalytic Essays on the Unexamined Life (1993)
- On Flirtation: Psychoanalytic Essays on the Uncommitted Life (1994)
- Terrors and Experts (1995)
- Monogamy (1996)
- The Beast in the Nursery: On Curiosity and Other Appetites (1998)
- Darwin's Worms: On Life Stories and Death Stories (1999)
- Promises, Promises (2000)
- Houdini's Box: On the Arts of Escape (2001)
- Equals: On Inhibition, Mockery, Hierarchy, and the Pleasures of Democracy (2002)
- Going Sane (2005)
- Side Effects (2006)
- Intimacies (with Leo Bersani, 2008)
- On Kindness (with Barbara Taylor, 2009)
- On Balance (2010)
- The Concise Dictionary of Dress (with Judith Clark, 2010)
- Missing Out: In Praise of the Unlived Life (2012)
- Becoming Freud: The Making of a Psychoanalyst (Yale UP, 2014)
- Unforbidden Pleasures (Penguin, 2015)
- In Writing (Penguin, 2017)
- Attention Seeking (Penguin, 2019)
- On Wanting To Change (Penguin, 2021)
- On Getting Better (Penguin, 2021)
- The Cure For Psychoanalysis (Karnac Books, 2021)
- On Giving Up (2024)
- The Life You Want (2026)

== See also ==
- Christopher Bollas
- Jacqueline Rose
- Joseph J. Sandler
