= Kenny Park =

South Korean businessman

- Born: Park Eun-kwan; 1954 or 1955 (age 71–72)
- Education: Yonsei University
- Occupation: businessman
- Known for: founder and CEO of Simone Accessory
- Children: 2

Korean name
- Hangul: 박은관
- Hanja: 朴殷寬
- RR: Bak Eungwan
- MR: Pak Ŭn'gwan

Kenny Park, also known as Park Eun-kwan, is a South Korean businessman. He is the founder and CEO of Simone Accessory, a handbag and accessories manufacturer. Forbes estimated his personal fortune in 2020 to be around $610 million.

== Early life ==
In 1978, Park earned a degree in German and literature from Yonsei University.

== Career ==
Park started making handbags for Donna Karan in 1987, and Simone Accessory now makes bags for other brands including Michael Kors, Kate Spade, Coach New York, Marc Jacobs, Tory Burch, Ralph Lauren, DVF, Alexander Wang, Phillip Lim, Proenza Schouler, Versus Versace, and AllSaints. Simone manufactures 30 million handbags and leather goods annually. He inaugurated the Simone Handbag Museum in 2012 and announced the launch of his own handbag brand, 0914, the following year.

In 2015, Blackstone Group acquired a 30% stake in Simone for $300 million. In 2016, his company Simone purchased the US manufacturer GST AutoLeather Inc., the world's largest leather car seat maker.

Park owns 62% of the company. In March 2018, Park became a billionaire. That same year, he made a $5-million donation to Concordia College's Language Villages to build an authentic Korean village in Minnesota.

Simone also operates multiple financial management and advisory companies including Simone Investment, a private equity firm and other real estate development funds.

== Personal life ==
Park is married, with two children, and lives in Seoul.
