= AKA Mr. Chow =

- Directed by: Nick Hooker
- Starring: Michael Chow
- Distributed by: HBO
- Release date: October 22, 2023
- Country: United States
- Language: English

AKA Mr. Chow is a 2023 documentary about the life of restaurateur Michael Chow. The film was made available on HBO on October 22, 2023. The film was directed by Nick Hooker and written by Jean Tsien.

== Reception ==
In her review for The Guardian, Lauren Mechling stated, "the food never shows up in AKA Mr Chow, the director Nick Hooker's feature-length documentary about the restaurateur Michael Chow, but that's sort of the point.(...) Skirting across decades and continents, with the help of evocative street footage and animations by Rohan Patrick McDonald, the movie is concerned with far more than Chow's talent for befriending celebrities and flair for decadence. It touches on pain points of the disarmingly energetic (and disarmingly dark-haired) 84-year-old's life, including his depression, gambling addiction and the tragic story of his wife Tina, who died from complications of AIDS in 1992, at age 41." Decider found the film "fascinating", and Fact magazine call it "captivating". GQ says: "But as the documentary shows, there's a lot about the famous restaurateur that most of us didn't know or consider. It shows Chow the personality as well as Chow the boss, Chow the painter, and Chow the immigrant." MovieWeb says that it is a "remarkable and well-executed documentary about a captivating figure whose attention to detail and unrelenting passion made him famous". The Toronto Star even says that it is "not a food film, but the Gatsby-like measure of a man". Other reviews were also quite positive.
