= Dead Funny =

- Dead Funny VHS cover
- Directed by: John Feldman
- Written by: John Feldman; Cindy Oswin
- Produced by: Richard Abramowitz; Adam Brightman; David Hannay; Robert Marcus Executive producers: Paul L. Newman; Robert E. Baruc; David Marlow; Nigel Thomas; Peter Watson-Wood
- Starring: Elizabeth Peña; Andrew McCarthy; Paige Turco; Blanche Baker; Allison Janney; Adelle Lutz; Novella Nelson; Lisa Jane Persky; Michael Mantell; Ken Kensei; Bai Ling
- Cinematography: Todd Crockett
- Edited by: Einar Westerlund
- Music by: Sheila Silver
- Production companies: Avondale Pictures; Movie Screen Ent.
- Distributed by: A-Pix Entertainment; Ardustry Home Ent. Astral Films
- Release date: May 21, 1994
- Running time: 96 minutes
- Country: United States
- Language: English

Dead Funny is a 1994 independent drama film directed by John Feldman. It stars Elizabeth Peña as Vivian Saunders, a woman who comes home from work and finds her boyfriend Reggie Barker (Andrew McCarthy) pinned to her kitchen table with a long knife.

== Plot ==
Vivian Saunders (Elizabeth Peña) comes home one day to an unusual surprise: her boyfriend Reggie Barker (Andrew McCarthy) is lying on the kitchen table with a large sword sticking out of his body. At first Vivian thinks this must be some sort of joke, but she discovers that Reggie is indeed dead, and as she calls her best friend Louise (Paige Turco) to figure out what might have happened and what to do, it occurs to her that she blacked out after too much wine the night before and isn't sure what she did before she passed out. After a few phone calls, Vivian's women's support group arrives, and what to do about Reggie soon takes second place to what Vivian should do for herself.

== Cast ==
- Elizabeth Peña as Vivian "Viv" Saunders
- Andrew McCarthy as Reggie Barker
- Paige Turco as Louise
- Blanche Baker as Barbara
- Allison Janney as Jennifer
- Adelle Lutz as Mari
- Novella Nelson as Frances
- Lisa Jane Persky as Sarah
- Michael Mantell as Harold
- Ken Kensei as Yoshi
- Bai Ling as Norriko

== Release ==
This film has only been released on VHS and LaserDisc format.

== Reception ==
David Nusair of DVD Talk negatively reviewed the film, saying "By the time we find out what really happened to McCarthy's character, it's impossible to care." Time Out also negatively reviewed the film, writing "How did it happen? Who did it? Who cares? Probably not Feldman who seems more interested in shooting his actresses' naked thighs." The New York Times stated that Dead Funny "tries so hard to be ingeniously tricky and ambiguous that it ends up outsmarting itself".

Variety positively reviewed the film, praising Peña's performance.
