= The Big Hit =

- Theatrical release poster
- Directed by: Che-Kirk Wong
- Written by: Ben Ramsey
- Produced by: Warren Zide; Wesley Snipes; Craig Perry; John Woo
- Starring: Mark Wahlberg; Lou Diamond Phillips; Christina Applegate; Avery Brooks; Bokeem Woodbine; Antonio Sabàto Jr.; Lainie Kazan; Elliott Gould; Sab Shimono; Lela Rochon
- Cinematography: Danny Nowak
- Edited by: Robin Russell; Pietro Scalia
- Music by: Graeme Revell
- Production companies: TriStar Pictures; Zide/Perry Productions
- Distributed by: Sony Pictures Releasing
- Release date: April 24, 1998
- Running time: 91 minutes
- Country: United States
- Language: English
- Budget: $13 million
- Box office: $27 million

The Big Hit is a 1998 American action comedy film directed by Hong Kong filmmaker Che-Kirk Wong, and stars Mark Wahlberg, Lou Diamond Phillips, Christina Applegate, Bokeem Woodbine, Antonio Sabàto Jr., China Chow, Avery Brooks, Lainie Kazan, Elliott Gould, Sab Shimono and Lela Rochon. The Big Hit was released by Sony Pictures Releasing on April 24, 1998. The film received mixed reviews from critics and grossed $27 million against a $13 million budget.

The film was shot in Hamilton and Pickering, Ontario, Canada.

== Plot ==
Melvin Smiley has a good life thanks to his talents as a contract-killer, but has a very working class mentality going about his life, in combination with his constant struggles to maintain two romantic relationships. One is with the demanding and demeaning Chantel, who does not accept his work, and the other with Pam, who knows nothing of his job. Melvin is somewhat of a pushover, trying to appease all of Chantel's demands, even her most expensive wishes, as well as rolling over whenever one of his co-workers takes credit for his achievements. Perhaps as a result of his helplessness in asserting himself, throughout the early scenes, Melvin is often seen drinking Maalox to relieve a developing stress-induced ulcer.

Feeling underpaid for their work for mob boss Paris, the assassin team of Smiley, Cisco, Crunch, Vince and Gump take an independent job, kidnapping Keiko Nishi, the teenage daughter of local electronics magnate Jiro Nishi, for a hefty ransom. Unfortunately, the team does not realize that Nishi has recently gone bankrupt over his failed foray into films and furthermore, their boss Paris is the girl's godfather. Enlisted by the group to hold Keiko, Melvin has to hide the bound and gagged schoolgirl on his property, attempting to keep her presence hidden from Pam and her parents, who are coming for dinner.

Melvin feels sorry for Keiko and relieves her from her bondage. In the ensuing hours they build up a rapport preparing dinner together, an act which leads into a love scene reminiscent of the pottery scene from Ghost, but which is cut short when Keiko attempts to escape. Ordered by Paris to discover the kidnappers of his goddaughter, a panicked Cisco kills Gump, but not before coaxing him into also implicating Melvin for the kidnapping.

A team of assassins crash Melvin's dinner with Pam's family, leading to a shootout during which Melvin realizes Pam was going to break up with him over pressure from her mother, a hardcore Jew who is severely against her being with Melvin, a Gentile. Melvin and Keiko's growing feelings for each other lead them to forming an awkward romance, and she and Melvin attempt to escape from the fiasco, pursued by Cisco. In the chaos, Melvin happens to run into Chantel and finally takes the opportunity to stand up to her and end their relationship.

A fight ensues between Cisco and Melvin, culminating at a video store where the ever-honest Melvin stops to return an overdue tape of King Kong Lives. Melvin kills Cisco by stabbing him in the chest, but not before Cisco arms an explosive device. Melvin leaves the building and is confronted by Keiko, her father and Paris. He re-enters the building, which explodes.

Paris and Nishi, believing Melvin to be dead, call off the manhunt. Soon Melvin is revealed to have survived, sheltered from the blast by an enormous solid gold film stand-up made for the flop that destroyed Nishi's career. Melvin and Keiko are reunited and ride off together, while Nishi recoups his losses by making a film out of the story of his daughter's kidnapping.

== Cast ==
- Mark Wahlberg as Melvin Smiley
- Lou Diamond Phillips as Cisco
- Christina Applegate as Pam Shulman
- Avery Brooks as Paris
- Bokeem Woodbine as Crunch
- Antonio Sabàto Jr. as Vince
- China Chow as Keiko Nishi
- Lainie Kazan as Jeanne Shulman
- Elliott Gould as Morton Shulman
- Sab Shimono as Jiro Nishi
- Robin Dunne as Gump
- Lela Rochon as Chantel
- Danny Smith as Video Store Kid

== Production ==
The Big Hit was shot for the relatively low budget of $13 million and was produced by film partners John Woo, Terence Chang, and Wesley Snipes.

== Reception ==
=== Box office ===
The film debuted at #1 at the box office. It went on to gross $27.0 million domestically.

=== Critical response ===
The Big Hit had a mixed reception from critics.

Jack Matthews commented in the Los Angeles Times that "The Big Hit, which was brought to Wesley Snipes' production company by Hong Kong legend John Woo, attempts to take the East-West merger even further, and the result is an only fitfully funny comic mongrel."

Remarked Roger Ebert, "I guess you could laugh at this. You would have to be seriously alienated from normal human values and be nursing a deep-seated anger against movies that make you think even a little, but you could laugh."

The New York Times' Lawrence Van Gelder was equally scathing: "If The Big Hit had any valid claim to excellence, rest assured that its release would have been delayed till summer. That, experience shows, is the proper season for movies built on a foundation of lavish crime, carnage, comedy, chases, crashes and chicks. The Big Hit has all these elements, and none are top-of-the-line. The name of John Woo, the talented Hong Kong-school director of the hit Face/Off, is plastered around The Big Hit. But this bait should not deter the eye from the switch: Woo is an executive producer. The director of The Big Hit is Che-Kirk Wong, another Hong Kong veteran, making his North American debut. Insatiable moviegoers are advised to wait till this action-comedy, written by Ben Ramsey, thuds into video stores; tasteful moviegoers will avoid it altogether."

And finally, Jeff Vice of the LDS Church-owned Deseret News remarked: "Every bit as frustating [sic] as it is entertaining, this black comedy/thriller takes its plotting and dialogue cues from Tarantino (meaning there is rampant use of profanity) and its startling visual style from Woo, who served as the film's executive producer. Unfortunately, it's a very uneasy blending of the two styles, and as a result there as many awful moments as good ones—at least until the extremely unsatisfying and drawn-out conclusion, which blows things completely."

In a retrospective review published in 2010, critic Leonard Maltin praised the film as a guilty pleasure, and said that "most critics despised The Big Hit, and audiences didn't flock to see it, perhaps confused as to whether it was a comedy or an action movie ... and never dreaming it was a hybrid of the two." He also states, "it expands its ideas to such a ludicrous extreme that you can't take it seriously, and that's just what I like about it."

It currently holds a 41% rating on Rotten Tomatoes based on 41 reviews, with an average score of 5.1/10. The site consensus reads: "The Big Hit seeks to blend the best of Hong Kong and American action cinema, but ends up offering a muddled mush that mostly misses". Metacritic, which uses a weighted average, assigned the film a score of 31 out of 100, based on 20 critics, indicating "generally unfavorable" reviews. Audiences polled by CinemaScore gave the film an average grade of "C−" on an A+ to F scale.
