= Adelle Lutz =

American artist, designer (b. 1948)

- Born: November 13, 1948 (age 77); Lakewood, Ohio, U.S.
- Known for: Installation art; performance art; sculpture; costume design
- Spouse: David Byrne (m. 1987; div. 2004)
- Children: 1
- Relatives: Tina Chow (sister); China Chow (niece)

Adelle Lutz (born November 13, 1948) is an American artist, designer and actress, most known for work using unconventional materials and strategies to explore clothing as a communicative medium. She first gained attention for the surreal "Urban Camouflage" costumes featured in David Byrne's film True Stories (1986).

She has designed costumes for film director Susan Seidelman, theater directors Robert Wilson and JoAnne Akalaitis, and musicians including Byrne, Bono and Michael Stipe. In the 1990s, she began to shift from costume to sculpture, installation art and eventually, performance. Lutz's art and design have been exhibited at the Metropolitan Museum of Art and Fashion Institute of Technology (FIT) (New York), the Victoria and Albert Museum and Barbican Art Centre (London), the Montreal Museum of Decorative Arts and the Rock and Roll Hall of Fame (Cleveland), among many venues. In 2002, the Judith Clark Costume Gallery in London presented a career survey.

Her work has also been featured in The New York Times, Harper's Magazine, Newsweek, Village Voice, Vanity Fair and Paper and in books on fashion, costume and public art, including Fashion and Surrealism (1987), Designed for Delight (1997), Twenty Years of Style: The World According to Paper (2004), and Because Dreaming is Best Done in Public: Creative Time in Public Spaces (2012). Her work Ponytail Boot (2002) is part of the Metropolitan Museum of Art collection.

Adelle Lutz, "Urban Camouflage Clothing", Brick Couple, Costumes for the film True Stories, 1986.

== Life ==
Lutz was born in Lakewood, Ohio, in 1948. Her parents were Mona Miwako Furuki, a native of Japan who studied couture, and Walter Lutz, an American businessman in international trade; they met in occupied Japan on Christmas Day 1945, while Walter served with the United States Army. Their collection of over 4,000 Asian bamboo works and objects is part of the Denver Art Museum's collection and was exhibited in the museum's Walter + Mona Lutz Gallery, which Adelle co-designed.

As a teenager, Lutz moved with her family to Tokyo, where she attended International Christian University and with her sister, jewelry designer Tina Chow, modeled for the cosmetics company Shiseido, among other firms, between 1967 and 1972.

Lutz was working with theater director Robert Wilson, when she met David Byrne in 1982; the three collaborated on The Knee Plays section of Wilson's opera, the CIVIL warS. She and Byrne married in 1987 and their daughter, Malu Abeni Valentine Lutz Byrne, was born in 1989. Byrne's former bandmate Chris Frantz claims that Byrne left Lutz in 2002 immediately following the ceremony inducting his band Talking Heads into the Rock and Roll Hall of Fame.

Lutz has lived in Los Angeles since 2008. Her first grandchild was born in August 2018.

== Work ==
Adelle Lutz and David Byrne, The Aunt, "Dressed Objects" series, mixed media, 1998.

Writers and critics have sometimes struggled with Lutz's creative identity, situating her, in Met curator Harold Koda's words, "in a netherworld of fashion and art." Carlo McCormick summed up Lutz's eclectic, collaborative output as "uncannily eccentric work" that "has danced along the periphery of fashion, theater, performance art, music and film for decades" before shifting to individual art in the late 1990s. Writers generally note her affinities to the unexpected juxtapositions and deadpan humor of Dada and Surrealism, a Pop-like appreciation of everyday, consumerist objects and culture, and a consistent engagement with concepts and materials related to the body and dress. In the catalogue to her 2002 retrospective, Koda concluded, "despite her apparent whimsy and good humor, like the Dadaists, Lutz is consistently, if subtly, subversive."

=== Costume design ===
Lutz has created costuming for film, performance, theater, display, and as artwork. Between 1983 and 1986, she designed costumes for the Talking Heads videos "Burning Down the House", "This Must Be the Place (Naive Melody)", "Road to Nowhere", and "Love For Sale", before attracting widespread attention for the "Urban Camouflage" clothing featured in the fashion show segment of David Byrne's True Stories (1986). The surreal garments (e.g., Astroturf Family or Fir Coat) mimicked conventional, often low-brow materials (wood paneling, brick, plastic greenery) and explored the idea of camouflage as a metaphor for conformity to manicured, middle-class suburban life. Curator Judith Clark described them as "dead-pan jokes" that viewers get immediately without being disturbed by their "strangeness"; other writers suggest that the pieces reflect on the obliteration of self in contemporary society. Subsequent to the film, the costumes were featured in an Annie Leibovitz photo shoot in Vanity Fair and shows at FIT ("Fashion and Surrealism", 1987), the Museum of Contemporary Design and Applied Arts, Lusanne (2002), and Imperial War Museum, London (2007); they also appear in books, such as Paternalia (2015) and Disruptive Pattern Material (2004), among others.

In the decade that followed, Lutz worked on diverse projects. She designed a contemporary wardrobe for Jesus for a tongue-in-cheek, 1987 Harper's Magazine feature that commissioned professionals in various fields to create components for a fictional, second-coming of Jesus of Nazareth "American Tour". Her Christmas 1992 window design for Barneys displaying unconventionally dressed reindeer women (e.g., a four-armed "Deliah Donner", playing a trumpet, tambourine, cymbals and drum and sporting a Women's Action Coalition button) were twice written up in The New York Times. In 1997, Lutz created Muscle Suit (1997) for David Byrne's "Feelings" concert tour, a costume whose entire surface displayed an anatomical illustration of human musculature. She also produced concert costumes for Michael Stipe for the R.E.M. "Green" tour (1997).

Lutz has frequently created costume designs for experimental theater directors. She worked on The Knee Plays segment of Robert Wilson's opera, the CIVIL warS (1984), JoAnne Akalaitis's productions of Leon Lena (and Lenz) (Guthrie Theatre, 1988) and Dream Play (Juilliard School Theatre, 1996), and David Gordon's The Firebugs (Guthrie Theatre, 1995) and Punch and Judy Get Divorced (American Music Theatre Festival, 1996). Her film costuming credits include Checking Out (dir. David Leland, 1989) and the Paul Auster-directed films Lulu on the Bridge (1997) and The Inner Life of Martin Frost (2007). Her wedding costumes for Susan Seidelman's Making Mr. Right (1987) were praised in Janet Maslin's New York Times review of the film.

Adelle Lutz, Corporate Adam + Eve, 2002.

=== Costume art and sculpture ===
In the late 1990s, Lutz turned to garment and furniture-related artworks that critics suggest use simple perceptual changes to create unexpected, sometimes disquieting readings and associations regarding identity, gender and culture. She collaborated with David Byrne on the "Dressed Objects" series (1998–9), which outfitted furniture and household items in ruffled skirts, chinos, slip, and more, imbuing mundane objects with idiosyncratic character and unexpected humanity. In The Wedding Party (2000–2) they staged the dressed objects as a surreal, imaginary wedding party to create what critics called curious and mysterious relationships between the anthropomorphized "figures". In her costume work, Lutz extended the strategy of Muscle Suit to create pieces such as Velvet Pelvis (2001)—a magenta velvet cocktail dress with a ghostly, correctly positioned illustration of a woman's pelvic bones—and Velvet Spine (2001), a black men's suit with spinal vertebrae depicted on the back.

That work led to a series exhibited at Färgfabriken in Stockholm, Centraal Museum in Utrecht, and New York, which used human hair as the expressive element in clothing and furnishings that explore ideas around the body, concealment, propriety, desire and disgust. Corporate Adam and Eve (2001) featured male and female mannequins wearing a flesh-toned suit and dress, both with gender appropriate body hair on the outside of the clothing; New York Times critic Ken Johnson described two related works—an elegant beige chair whose upholstered seat featured a triangle of soft wavy hair and a prim, short-sleeved sweater with long tresses added to the armpits—as capturing "a high-low tension" that "is demure yet oddly sexy." Curator Jan Åman described the series as work within the traditionally defined "female sphere" that was "meticulously crafted [and] at once elegant, perverse, and unabashedly strong."

=== Public art and installations ===
Adelle Lutz, The Peace Piece, Performance (detail still at 34th Street, New York City), 2003.

In 1993, Lutz created the site-specific installation One Size Fits All, commissioned in New York by the 42nd Street Development Project and Creative Time for the "42nd St. Art Project". Combining her interests in clothing, unconventional materials and sociopolitical commentary, she created an "American Shemale" window (in an American Male store) displaying bright yellow mannequins in tailored coats and boots fashioned from draped and quilted condoms, among other materials. Critic Roberta Smith noted its discreetly subversive aesthetic matching "the street's tacky visual style" and playful safe-sex messaging; New York Newsday called it "deadpan preaching so outrageously glitzy it looks as if it was always there."

In 2003, Lutz staged the anti-war public performance The Peace Piece, a 12-hour procession through the streets of Manhattan by six women wearing black burkhas hand-painted with U.N. statistics about war (e.g., "90% of war casualties are civilians." or "23 million people live in Iraq. Half are children.") or the image of a full-term baby on the belly. It took place on March 21, 2003 (the first day of spring and the Persian New Year), with the participants walking while engaged in Buddhist metta ("well-wishing") meditation from the Staten Island Ferry war memorial, past the Stock Exchange, into Grand Central Station and Rockefeller Center, and, finally, to Times Square. Lucy Lippard described the performance's use of surprise as a tactic to publicly present moral, political and social dilemmas as "democracy in action." The project was also presented in earlier incarnations—as a single work and as the installation Burkha/Womb (2003), which featured a single burkha printed with the baby image—and as a storefront window installation documenting the performance with six of the burkhas and video and sound (by Courtney Harmel and Sara Driver).

== Acting and additional film work ==
In addition to her costume design, Lutz worked as an actress between 1986 and 1995. Her first role was a supporting one as a spirit haunting her former lover's wife in an episode of Alfred Hitchcock Presents ("The Canary Sedan"). She also had supporting roles in Tim Burton's Beetlejuice (1988), Wim Wenders's Until the End of the World (1991), and Dead Funny (1994) with Elizabeth Peña and Andrew McCarthy. Writer Pico Iyer wrote that she brought a "swan-necked grace" to her portrayal of Aung Sun Suu Kyi in the John Boorman film Beyond Rangoon (1995); New York Times critic Caryn James wrote that her "ethereal" presence hovered over the film. Lutz also appeared in Jonathan Demme's The Silence of the Lambs (1991) and Something Wild (1986), Oliver Stone's Wall Street (1987), and Checking Out (1989).

In 1990, Lutz and Sandy McLeod co-directed the music video "Too Darn Hot", performed by Erasure for Red Hot + Blue, an ABC special seen in 35 countries that was created to raise public awareness about AIDS and to benefit AIDS organizations. The video mixed TV news images, critique and safe-sex messages, but was censored by the network (aired with cuts), which cited concerns about the "balance" of its criticisms of the health care system and Reagan and Bush administrations; The Hollywood Reporter nonetheless called it one of the program's "strongest moments". In 1995, Lutz also created the production design for the Bono segment of the documentary Inner City Blues: The Music of Marvin Gaye, directed by Earle Sebastian (1995).
