= Daughter of Shanghai (memoir) =

Memoir by Tsai Chin published in 1988

- Author: Tsai Chin
- Language: English
- Publication date: 1988

Daughter of Shanghai is a memoir by Tsai Chin, published in 1988 by St. Martin's Press in the United States and by Chatto and Windus in the United Kingdom.

Jean Fritz in the Washington Post wrote that "The heart of this book lies in Tsai Chin's conflicts as she tried to feel at home in two cultures on opposite sides of the world."

== Contents ==
The initial part of the book discusses Shanghai during World War II, and later it discusses post 1949 Shanghai. After she arrives in the West, she describes how she had made slights towards her Chinese background while trying to achieve in her career. The book also discusses how the Cultural Revolution resulted in her parents' deaths.

== Reception ==
Reviewer Richard Harris described the work as an "authentic record" of the time periods the actress lived in.

Polly Toynbee of The Guardian said, "The world of Tsai Chin has been a good deal more interesting than The World of Suzie Wong, the play that made her into a star." Richard West of The Sunday Telegraph wrote, "An extraordinary and occasionally tragic life story."

Beth Duff in New York Times Book Review wrote, "Captivating account" that is "skillfully interwoven the glamour and despair."

Fritz described the writing as showing the author's genuine self, rather than trying to "manipulate" the readership.

In 1989, Daughter of Shanghai was voted "One of the Ten Best Books of the Year (十本好书)" by Hong Kong TV Cultural Group.
