= Michael Chow (restaurateur) =

Chinese-born British actor, interior designer and restaurateur

- Born: 7 March 1939 (age 87); Shanghai, China
- Occupations: Restaurateur, interior designer, actor, painter
- Years active: 1958–present
- Spouses: Grace Coddington (m. 1968; div. 1969) Tina Lutz (m. 1972; div. 1989) Eva Chun (m. 1992; div. 2017) Vanessa Rano (m. 2019)
- Children: 5, including China Chow
- Parent(s): Zhou Xinfang; Lilian Qiu
- Relatives: Tsai Chin (sister)

Michael Chow (simplified Chinese: 周英华; traditional Chinese: 周英華; pinyin: Zhōu Yīnghuá; born 7 March 1939) is a British Chinese restaurateur, interior designer, artist and actor. Chow, also known as M, is the co-founder and owner of the Mr Chow restaurant chain. He has appeared in numerous films, held solo art exhibitions and worked as an architectural designer.

== Life and career ==
Chow was born Zhou Yinghua in Shanghai. His father was Zhou Xinfang, one of China's most famous actors of his time and a leading figure of Peking Opera. His mother who was Catholic gave him the name Michael. His sister is an actress and erstwhile Bond girl Tsai Chin.

His mother came from a wealthy family whose fortune had been made in tea. He was sent to a British boarding school when he was 12 and spent his adolescence in Europe; after arriving in London in 1952, he was never able to speak to nor see his father again. In 1956, Chow studied at Saint Martin's School of Arts and the following year at the Hammersmith School of Building and Architecture. He had a career as a painter in parallel with his acting career. He had multiple gallery shows across London, including at the Institute of Contemporary Arts.

Chow and his business partner Robin Sutherland opened "Smith and Hawes", a hair salon in London's Sloane Avenue, which they later sold to the famous hairdresser Leonard of Grosvenor Square, when it became Leonard and Twiggy. Chow then came up with a concept to open a restaurant that offered Chinese food served by Italian waiters, and with a menu the British could understand. Sutherland backed his idea, raised the money, and housed six chefs hired from Hong Kong. Chow designed the restaurant featuring cool green floor tiles and white walls, and Mr Chow opened in Knightsbridge, London in February 1968, serving Pekinese cuisine. Chow bought art by Allen Jones, Peter Blake, Patrick Caulfield, David Hockney and Jim Dine for the walls, which became as celebrated as the food. The partners opened three other Mr Chow restaurants in London before Chow bought Sutherland out and moved to New York. His restaurant chain has expanded to places such as Las Vegas, Miami, New York City and Beverly Hills.

Chow has said his restaurants have always been underlined by "this desire and need to promote the Chinese culture", which he has done through food. He visits China at least twice a year, and has said he's thrilled by the country's economic growth and greater presence on the world stage. "China always has been a great, great nation", Chow said in an interview for The Wall Street Journal and added, "Chinese people — I like them. What can I say?" His restaurants have been widely panned by food critics, but have remained popular for decades due to their ability to attract celebrities with the allure of fancy dining and intentionally high prices.

Chow was appointed to the 12-member board of governors for Edythe and Eli Broad's three-story, $140 million contemporary art museum, The Broad, in downtown Los Angeles.

From an early age, Chow became an obsessive collector of furniture and contemporary art, notably his now famous collection of portraits (of himself) by world-renowned artists. Since the sixties he has designed many architectural projects, including all of his restaurants, the Giorgio Armani boutiques in Beverly Hills and Las Vegas, and his home in Holmby Hills, Los Angeles.

In 2011, Chow returned to his passion for painting with the encouragement of his friends, gallerist Jeffrey Deitch and artist Julian Schnabel. In 2014, his first solo exhibition was held at Pearl Lam Galleries in Hong Kong. His major solo exhibition in 2016 at the Ullens Centre for Contemporary Art in Beijing was an homage to his father, Zhou Xinfang. In 2023, he was the subject of a documentary film.

== Personal life ==
He has been married four times, first to Grace Coddington from 1968 to 1969, then to Tina Lutz from 1972 to 1989, and third to Eva Chun from 1992 to 2017. His first three marriages ended in divorce and he has been married to Vanessa Rano since 9 February 2019.

Michael Chow has five children, including China Chow.

== Filmography ==
- Violent Playground (1958) – Alexander (appearing with his sister, Tsai Chin)
- The Savage Innocents (1960) – Undik
- Marco Polo (1961) – Ciu-Lin
- 55 Days at Peking (1963) – Chiang (uncredited)
- Modesty Blaise (1966) – Weng
- The Brides of Fu Manchu (1966) – Guard (appearing with his sister, Tsai Chin)
- You Only Live Twice (1967) – SPECTRE #4 (appearing with his sister, Tsai Chin)
- The Touchables (1968) – Denzil
- Joanna (1968) – Lefty
- Who Is Killing the Great Chefs of Europe? (1978) – Soong
- Hammett (1982) – Fong Wei Tau
- Dream Lover (1994) – Mr. Mura
- Basquiat (1996) – Michael Chow
- Lethal Weapon 4 (1998) – Benny's Assistant
- Rush Hour (1998) – Dinner Guest
- Rush Hour 2 (2001) – Gambler
- The Circuit (2002) – Vixton's Communication Thug
- Rush Hour 3 (2007) – Chinese Foreign Minister
- My Sister's Keeper (2009) – Dr. Chow
- AKA Mr. Chow (2023) - Himself
