= Frankenfish =

2004 television film by Mark A.Z. Dippé

- DVD cover
- Written by: Simon Barrett; Scott Clevenger
- Directed by: Mark A.Z. Dippé
- Starring: Tory Kittles; K. D. Aubert; China Chow; Matthew Rauch; Donna Biscoe
- Music by: Hot Wheelz
- Country of origin: United States
- Original language: English

Production
- Producer: David Hillary
- Cinematography: Eliot Rockett
- Editors: Drew Hall; Dennis O'Connor
- Running time: 84 minutes

Original release
- Network: Sci Fi Channel
- Release: October 9, 2004

Frankenfish is a 2004 American horror film directed by Mark A.Z. Dippé. Filmed in Baldwin County, Alabama, a pack of massive, bloodthirsty, genetically engineered fish combing the quiet bayou waters of the river in the Louisiana Bayou, searching for prey. Based on the snakehead fish incident in a Crofton, Maryland, pond, Frankenfish is one of three films based on the incident, the others being Snakehead Terror and Swarm of the Snakehead.

== Plot ==
Fishermen John Crankton is killed by an unseen animal. The next day, medical examiner Sam Rivers and biologist Mary Callahan travel into the bayou to investigate John's mysterious death. Having grown up in the area, Sam is comfortable in his surroundings while Mary is not. They find Elmer noodling for catfish in the swamp canals. With Elmer, Sam and Mary travel upriver to the fishing community. They meet Gloria and Eliza Crankton, John's wife and daughter. Eliza and her semi-boyfriend Dan are there to help Gloria move after John's death, a task Dan complains about. Gloria explains that a strange boat washed upriver three months ago after a hurricane and weird things have happened since.

Sam and Mary find a large fishing boat along the bank of a canal. They explore the interior while Elmer waits in the boat outside. They discover the remains of the crew in the hold. Upset and nauseous, Mary clumsily knocks Elmer from the boat and something drags him down. Sam and Mary flee in the boat, unaware that they have triggered a homing signal on the ship. On the mainland, a team relays the information to their employer, Jeff, a wealthy bounty hunter.

Later that night, Roland hears noises while on the roof of his houseboat. He leans over the edge and an unseen fish leaps up and decapitates him. His wife Bobbi attempts to escape the houseboat on a small boat, but the fish (revealing itself a frankenfish) flips her out and kills her. Frightened, the group tries to flee in boats, but the fish destroys them. Trying to come with a plan to escape, Eliza gets over to Roland and Bobbi's house to try and start it up to escape. However, the houseboat is inoperable. On a neighboring stilt house, Ricardo baits a large hook using an entire catfish and manages to land the fish. Roughly as big as a full-grown man, the fish can breathe air and hops forward biting at Ricardo's legs. Ricardo manages to kill it with a shotgun blast to the head. In vengeance, he tears out its heart and barbecues it. As he takes his first bite, a second frankenfish leaps from the water and devours him.

While everyone panics, Mary declares she has an idea on how to get off the boathouse. Before she can explain, she is killed by an accidental gunshot due to an explosion. A fire propels a propane tank into the boathouse causing an explosion that sends Eliza into the water. Sam dives in and rescues her. Simultaneously, the fish leaps from the water and bites off Gloria's legs. The fish begins attacking the boathouses, punching holes in them to make them sink.

Jeff and his crew arrive and the fish attacks them too, knocking them out of the fanboat. They swim quickly to the safety of the sinking stilt houses. Jeff explains that the fish are genetically engineered snakeheads. Sam, Eliza, and Dan have no choice but to join Jeff in pursuing the fish, even after most of his crew is killed.

The crew follows a trail of blood back to the fish's den and find the fish is dead. Jeff forces Sam at gunpoint to enter first. Sam flees the den as behind him, a third, much larger frankenfish kills two hunters, including Jeff. Dan, Sam, and Eliza quickly leave on the fan boat, chased by the fish. Dan falls from the boat during the chase but scrambles up a mudbank. Realizing they cannot outrace the fish, Sam drives the fan boat up a stand of tree stumps and knocks off the protective lining of the fan. Unable to slow its momentum, the fish launches into the whirling blades to its death. Sam and Eliza kiss and go back the way they came to get Dan. However, Dan is trapped in the mud as dozens of baby frankenfish attack him.

== Cast ==
- Tory Kittles as Sam Rivers, a medical examiner
- K. D. Aubert as Eliza "Liza" Crankton, John & Gloria's daughter
- China Chow as Mary Callahan, a biologist
- Matthew Rauch as Dan, Liza's lawyer boyfriend
- Donna Biscoe as Gloria Crankton, Liza's mother
- Tomas Arana as Jeff
- Mark Boone, Jr. as Joseph
- Reggie Lee as Anton
- Noelle Evans as Bobbi
- Richard Edson as Roland
- Muse Watson as Elmer
- Steve Ritzi as Pilot
- Ron Gural as The Coroner / Sheriff
- Eugene Collier as John Crankton, Gloria's husband and Liza’s father
- Sean Patterson as Abrams
- Raoul Trujillo as Ricardo
- Marco St. John as Chief

== Home media ==
Frankenfish was released on DVD and VHS on October 26, 2004.

== Reception ==
James Mudge of Beyond Hollywood wrote that the film, as judged by its peers, was "a surprising success". Jon Condit of Dread Central rated it 3.5/5 stars and wrote, "It is what it is and it’s better at being it than most of the recent offerings similar to it." Dennis Prince of DVD Verdict wrote that the film is a retread but has good gore effects. In a 2018 retrospective review, Glenn Cochrane of ScreenRealm wrote that although the film's visual effects are severely dated, it still offers a fun time for viewers with "a penchant for cheesy B movie creature features."
