= Tsai Chin (actress) =

Chinese-British actress (born 1937)

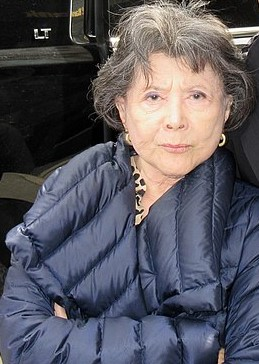
- Tsai Chin in 2019
- Born: 1 September 1933 (age 93); Tianjin, Republic of China
- Other name: Irene Chow
- Citizenship: United Kingdom
- Education: Royal Academy of Dramatic Art; Tufts University
- Occupations: Actress, singer, director, teacher, author
- Years active: 1957–present
- Spouses: Frank Chang (m. 1955; div. 1956): Peter Coe
- Children: 1
- Parent(s): Zhou Xinfang; Lilian Qiu
- Relatives: Michael Chow (brother); China Chow (niece)

Chinese name
- Traditional Chinese: 周採芹
- Simplified Chinese: 周采芹
Transcriptions
Standard Mandarin
- Hanyu Pinyin: Zhōu Cǎiqín
- Wade–Giles: Chou^{1} Ts'ai^{3}-ch'in^{2}
- IPA: [ʈʂóʊ tsʰàɪ.tɕʰǐn]

Tsai Chin (Chinese: 周采芹; born 1 September 1933) is a Chinese-British actress, singer, director, and teacher. Her career spans more than six decades and three continents.

The daughter of Peking Opera star Zhou Xinfang, Chin was born in Shanghai and educated there and in British Hong Kong. She became the first Chinese-born student of the Royal Academy of Dramatic Art in London, of which she is an Associate Member. Initially under the stage name Irene Chow, she starred onstage in London's West End in The World of Suzie Wong and on Broadway in Golden Child. Chin appeared in two James Bond films, 39 years apart, as a Bond girl in You Only Live Twice; and in Casino Royale.

In the United States, Chin is best known for her role as Auntie Lindo in the film The Joy Luck Club (1993). She also appeared in the Marvel Cinematic Universe television series Agents of S.H.I.E.L.D. episode "The Only Light in the Darkness" (2014) as Lian May and in the feature film Shang-Chi and the Legend of the Ten Rings (2021) as Waipo. She was the first acting instructor to be invited to teach in China after the Cultural Revolution, when China's universities reopened. In China, she is best known for her portrayal of Grandmother Jia in the 2010 TV drama series The Dream of Red Mansions.

== Early life and education ==
Tsai Chin was born on 1 September 1933, in Tianjin (Tientsin), China, where her father was on tour. She is the third daughter of the Peking opera actor and singer Zhou Xinfang (1895—1975) and Lilian Qiu (AKA Lilian Ju; 1905–1968). Chin has a brother, restaurateur Michael Chow.

She grew up in Shanghai French Concession, where (under her western name, "Irene Chow") she received a multilingual education at The Convent of the Sacred Heart, Mctyeire School (中西女中) in Shanghai and King George V School in Hong Kong. During her childhood, Tsai Chin was witness to much political conflict, such as Chinese Civil War, Japanese invasion of China, and Communist takeover in 1949.

At the age of 17, she was sent to England from Shanghai to study at The Royal Academy of Dramatic Art, where she was the first Chinese student in the art academy. Tsai Chin later became an Associate Member of The Royal Academy of Dramatic Art. She earned a master's degree at Tufts University in Boston, Massachusetts.

== Career ==
=== Early years ===
Tsai Chin's first significant film role came when she was cast in the film The Inn of the Sixth Happiness (1958), in which she played the adopted daughter of Ingrid Bergman's character. Her big break, though, arrived when two Broadway shows went to London at the same time. Initially, Tsai Chin was cast as one of the two leads in the musical Flower Drum Song. However, she also auditioned for the play The World of Suzie Wong for which she was offered the title role. The Daily Mail quoted Chin as saying, "I had a terrible decision to make." She opted to star as Suzie Wong at the Prince of Wales Theatre, London, where she saw her name in lights for the first time. The play, which ran from 1959 to 1961 was generally panned by the critics, but was a commercial hit. Chin drew good reviews, with Milton Shulman of the Evening Standard saying, "Tsai Chin is a lovely creature with all the vivacity, simplicity and gusts of unpredictable Eastern temperament." Harold Hobson of the Sunday Times said, "Tsai Chin who has cool clear beauty and considerable talent."

To compensate Chin for not being able to do the musical Flower Drum Song, producer Donald Albery granted her request to sing a song in The World of Suzie Wong. She chose a lyrical Chinese song, "Second Spring" (第二春), which was translated into English as "The Ding Dong Song", by Lionel Bart. Tsai Chin recorded the song in 1960 for Decca Records in London. The single, arranged and conducted by music director Harry Robinson, became a hit, particularly in Asia.

Chin followed the success of "Second Spring" by recording several more singles and two LPs. She later incorporating many of these songs, written specifically for her, into a cabaret act which she performed from 1961 to 1966. As well as touring her cabaret show throughout the United Kingdom, she also performed in London's most exclusive venues, including The Dorchester, the Savoy, the Society, and frequently Quaglino's and Allegro, sharing a bill with David Frost, then at the start of his career. Chin's cabaret act was also aired on television in Switzerland and the Netherlands. Variety called her a "Savvy entertainer, with most of her material tailor-made for her personality." London's Evening News was "impressed…by the way she held her audience, wasn't a murmur not even the clatter of one piece of cutlery."

- The World of Tsai Chin (1962) LK 4501 (mono and stereo)
- The Western World of Tsai Chin (1965) LK 4717 (mono)

=== 1960s ===
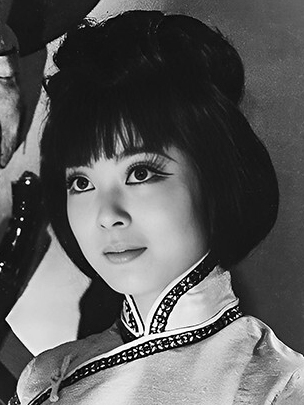
Chin as Lin Tang in The Face of Fu Manchu, 1965

Apart from her singing, she played Juicy Lucy in The Virgin Soldiers alongside Lynn Redgrave (1969), directed by John Dexter; helped to "assassinate" Sean Connery in You Only Live Twice (1967); worked for Michelangelo Antonioni on Blowup (1966) and for Fred Zinnemann in Man's Fate (1969), when the MGM studio unfortunately collapsed before filming barely started. From 1965 to 1969, she made five films opposite Christopher Lee as Lin Tang, daughter of Fu Manchu, a Chinese archvillain intent on dominating the world. As soon as she was in the position to do so, she fought to make Asian roles more truthful.

Her stage work at this time included leading roles in The Gimmick, with Donald Sutherland, at Criterion Theatre, West End (1962); The Magnolia Tree, at Royal Lyceum, Edinburgh (1966); Mrs. Frail in Love for Love, by William Congreve, in Watford (1970); and touring the United Kingdom in the title role of The Two Mrs. Carrolls (1969), with Paul Massie.

Tsai Chin made her television debut in the popular British hospital drama Emergency Ward 10, then International Detective (1960), Man of the World (1963), Dixon of Dock Green (1965), and The Troubleshooters (1967). In 1962, she traveled to New York City for the first time to guest star for a Christmas special The Defenders. In 1964 she had a recurring role in TW3, short for That Was The Week That Was, a popular satirical comedy show which was at the time a new concept in television presented by David Frost and produced by Ned Sherrin. She also co-starred with Roy Kinnear and Lance Percival in Five Foot Nine Show, and later starred in her own show, On Your Own for ITV (1965). She was invited to sing on a myriad of variety shows, talk shows and even game shows during this time. Her popularity was so high at that time that she even had a Chinese leopard in the London Zoo named after her.

The Cultural Revolution started in 1966. China shut itself off from the rest of the world and artists were purged, which eventually claimed the lives of both her parents; describing the 1960s in 2020 she said "While we in London began swinging and loving, China began swinging but hating. My parents suffered and died."

=== 1970s ===
She said "Another problem for minority actors is that we don't often work with beautiful dialogue. And there were less chances of working with great directors and actors. That's when you can learn a lot." In 1972, Tsai Chin portrayed Wang Guangmei in The Subject of Struggle, a docudrama directed by Leslie Woodhead, for Granada. Her performance as Wang, wife of Liu Shaoqi, Chairman Mao's chief rival, and the film about her trial by the Red Guards were unanimously praised. "It's all brilliantly done" The Sunday Times; Of Chin's performance: "Played superbly," Clive James of The Observer; "The most important program of the night…brilliantly, unforgettably played by Tsai Chin," Tom Hutchinson, Evening Standard TV guide; and by critic Elizabeth Crawly, Evening Standard: "Tsai Chin leaves The World of Suzie Wong a long way behind with this brave, haggard performance." It was a role she could identify with, as her father was undergoing the same brutal treatment in China. Moreover, it was almost the first time Tsai Chin was asked to play a mature and intelligent person with depth and complexity, a far cry from her usual stereotypical roles. For the first time, she was portraying a real person, not a stereotype; in her autobiography, she writes: "For the first time, the artist and the woman within me met at last." This film would signify the end of the first phase of Tsai Chin's acting career. In London, Tsai Chin suffered financial ruin and experienced mental health problems, brought on by her parents' deaths. She only felt able to return to China after Mao's death.

In the mid-1970s, Chin went to America and became a member of The Cambridge Ensemble, a multi-racial experimental group in what was then known as "the finest theater in Boston." Under the direction of Joann Green, she was given the opportunity to play strong women in western classics, such as Klytemnestra in The Oresteia (1977), with Tim McDonough as Agamemnon. Kevin Kelly of The Boston Globe said, "Tsai Chin is ice-wonderful." Jon Lehman of The Patriot Ledger said, "great performance, a portrayal which shows us why Clytemnestra is one of the great woman characters of all time." In 1977, she played Hester Prynne in The Scarlet Letter, again with Tim McDonough as Rev. Arthur Dimmesdale. Ken Emerson of The Boston Phoenix said: "It takes a prodigiously gifted and subtle actress to follow Hawthorn's stage directions." Arthur Friedman in The Real Paper said, "Chin's portrayal is great because it reaches the heart without stooping to sentimental theatrics."

Chin began taking courses in Shakespearean studies at Harvard University. This was followed by her full-time enrollment at Tufts University, where she earned a master's degree in drama in 1980. She later received the Tufts University Alumni Association for Distinguished Service to Profession award in 1994. To supplement her scholarship, she taught acting and made her director's debut in Harold Pinter's The Lover (1979). Her Master's project was Ugo Betti's Crime on Goat Island, which starred fellow student Oliver Platt, and was her entry to American College Theatre Festival (1980).

The end of the 1970s coincided with the end of the Cultural Revolution in China. Mao died in 1976, artists and intellectuals were reinstated, and universities that were closed for ten years reopened. Chin became the first drama coach invited from abroad by the Minister of Culture to China since the Moscow Arts Theatre's withdrawal in the fifties.

=== 1980s ===
On 29 March 1980, Chin met with her father's colleague Cao Yu (曹禺). The meeting took place in New York City, when Arthur Miller had hosted the playwright at Columbia University's School of International Affairs. This meeting resulted in an invitation to her by the Chinese Cultural Department to return to her home country after a quarter of a century's absence to teach a class at The Central Academy of Dramatic Art (中央戏剧学院), in Beijing in 1981. Prior to leaving for China, Jill Tweedie wrote an article about her in The Guardian: "After the age of 40, the little Suzie Wong Sex Kitten has remade herself into a mature, knowledgeable, exciting and excited human being." In 1982, she directed China's premiere production of William Shakespeare's The Tempest, "drawing inspiration from China's theatre tradition and Western internal acting."

After working in China, Chin returned to London, where she spent most of the decade serving as a cultural liaison between China and the United Kingdom, where, among many projects, Chin helped connect the British Arts Council with the theater arts in China and introduced Peking Opera productions. During this time she made many trips to Hong Kong to help transform Hong Kong Repertory Theatre to a fully professional theater company, teaching and introducing the works of Anton Chekhov to Hong Kong students. In Hong Kong, she directed the Asian premiere production of The Seagull (1982) and later Shakespeare's Twelfth Night (1988), as well as serving as a consultant to The Hong Kong Academy for Performing Arts (1993).

In 1988, her autobiography, Daughter of Shanghai, commissioned by Carmen Callil of Chatto & Windus, was published in England and became a worldwide best-seller. Polly Toynbee of The Guardian said, "The world of Tsai Chin has been a good deal more interesting than The World of Suzie Wong, the play that made her into a star." Richard West of The Sunday Telegraph wrote, "An extraordinary and occasionally tragic life story." Beth Duff in New York Times Book Review wrote, "Captivating account…skillfully interwoven the glamour and despair." Jean Fritz in the Washington Post and International Herald Tribune: "The heart of this book lies in her conflict as she tried to feel at home in two cultures…that is her triumph." In 1989, Daughter of Shanghai was voted "One of the Ten Best Books of the Year (十本好书)" by Hong Kong TV Cultural Group.

At the end of the 1980s, Chin resumed her acting career by returning to London's West End in David Henry Hwang's M. Butterfly (1989), starring Anthony Hopkins and Glen Goei, directed for the second time by John Dexter. It was during this production that Amy Tan, author of The Joy Luck Club, walked into her dressing room at the Shaftesbury Theatre, London.

=== 1990s ===
In 1990, Chin played the title role in Henry Ong's one-woman drama, Madame Mao's Memories in London, which was particularly ironic due to the fact that Chin's father was personally purged by Madame Mao and Chin's mother died due to the brutality of the Red Guards. The play, directed by Glen Goei and performed at The Latchmere, was the hottest ticket in town. Sheridan Morley in the Herald Tribune International said: "She brings to this study of Madame Mao in defeat a tremendous dramatic courage and intensity….It is Tsai Chin's triumph to make us do rather more than just hate her." In her autobiography, she remarked, "I was determined to be a good deal fairer in my representation of her than she ever was of my father."

Chin's final United Kingdom acting performance was in Bodycount by Les Smith, for Rear Window, Channel 4 (1993).

In 1993, Chin took on a role that would energize her acting career and change her life yet again when she played the role of Auntie Lindo in the hugely popular The Joy Luck Club. When Joy Luck Club came out, she received rave reviews for her work. "Gene Siskel said of her performance, 'I hope Academy voters don't overlook her because she's not a household name. I am going to repeat her name.'" Those words were repeated in both Variety and Hollywood Reporter under the title "Memo to the Academy" Janet Maslin of The New York Times: "Despite its huge cast, the film is virtually stolen by Tsai Chin." But the film did not receive a single award in any category. The day after the award ceremonies, on the front page of The New York Times' Arts & Leisure section, Maslin again wrote, "Did Disney back too many actresses?" Chin relocated to Los Angeles at the age of 62.

=== 2000s and 2010s ===
After moving to Hollywood, Chin was immediately given the lead in a one-hour television pilot Crowfoot (1994) by Magnum, P.I. producer Donald P. Bellisario. The series did not get picked up. In 1995, she played Brave Orchid in Maxine Hong Kingston's The Woman Warrior, directed by Sharon Ott, for which she received the Los Angeles Drama Critic Circle Award.

Chin played the role of Eng Sui-Yong in David Henry Hwang's Tony-nominated Golden Child, directed by James Lapine, which ultimately went to Broadway, Longacre Theatre (1995–1998), and for which she won an Obie Award and was nominated for The Helen Hayes Award. Laurie Winer, Los Angeles Times, commented on her performance as first wife: "Her descent into opium addiction is quite harrowing." Ben Brantley, The New York Times: "[Chin] suggests an Asian version of Bette Davis."

Other performances included roles in three Chay Yew plays: Half Lives, directed by Tim Dang at East West Players (1996); Wonderland, at La Jolla Playhouse; and adaptation of Federico García Lorca's The House of Bernarda Alba, playing Maria Josefa, the mad mother to Chita Rivera's Bernarda, directed by Lisa Peterson at Mark Taper Forum (2002).

Other work at this time was included the voice of Popo in the daytime Emmy Award-winning Popo and The Magic Pearl (1996); an eccentric Madame Wu in the TV drama The Diary of Ellen Rimbauer (2003); and Grandmother Wu in Wendy Wu: Homecoming Warrior (2006), starring Brenda Song as Wendy Wu.

In 2003 and 2004, Chin performed at the Hollywood Bowl, in China Night, reciting poetry backed by a hundred-piece orchestra, conducted by John Mauceri, the founder of Hollywood Bowl Orchestra. She was a guest in numerous television series, most notably the recurring role as Helen, Sandra Oh's frivolous mother, in Grey's Anatomy, and recently Royal Pains.

Chin made numerous indie films and many features, notably appearing as Chairman Xu in Red Corner (1997), Auntie in Memoirs of a Geisha (2005), and Madame Wu in James Bond thriller Casino Royale (2006). In 2008, she was offered the role of the Dowager Jia (贾母) in a lavish adaptation of Dream of the Red Chamber (红楼梦), China's most beloved classic novel from the eighteenth century. This was her first time back working as an actress in China and she spent more than one year completing the 50 episodes (2010).

Back in Los Angeles, Chin accepted the title role of a woman suffering from Alzheimer's in Nani, an AFI thesis film directed by Justin Tipping, which won the Student Academy Award and DGA Student Film Award (2012).

In 2014, she appeared in Marvel's Agents of S.H.I.E.L.D., reuniting with her The Joy Luck Club co-star Ming-Na Wen, to play Melinda May's mother, Lian May.

Chin appeared in two episodes of HBO's Getting On. Her autobiography, Daughter of Shanghai, has been published in ten versions.

== Filmography ==
=== Film ===
- The Bridge on the River Kwai (1957) "Tokyo Rose" (voice)
- Yangtse Incident (1957) "Sampan girl"
- The Inn of the Sixth Happiness (1958) "Sui Lan"
- Violent Playground (1958) "Primrose"
- The Treasure of San Teresa (1959) "1st girl in fight"
- The Cool Mikado (1962) "Pitti Sing"
- The Face of Fu Manchu (1965) "Lin Tang"
- Invasion (1966) "Nurse Lim"
- Blowup (1966) "Receptionist"
- The Brides of Fu Manchu (1966) "Lin Tang"
- The Vengeance of Fu Manchu (1967) "Lin Tang"
- You Only Live Twice (1967) "Ling" (appearing with her brother, Michael Chow)
- The Blood of Fu Manchu (1968) "Lin Tang"
- The Castle of Fu Manchu (1969) "Lin Tang"
- Man's Fate (1969) (unfinished)
- The Virgin Soldiers (1969) "Juicy Lucy"
- Rentadick (1972) "Madam Greenfly"
- The Joy Luck Club (1993) "Auntie Lindo"
- Red Corner (1997) "Chairman Xu" (dir. Jon Avnet)
- The Magic Pearl (1997) "Popo" voice
- Journey from the Heart (1999) "Grandma Lee"
- The Gold Cup (2000) "Ma"
- Titan A.E. (2000) "Old woman" (voice)
- Long Life, Happiness & Prosperity (2002) "Hun Ping Wong"
- The Interpreter (2005) "Luan"
- Memoirs of a Geisha (2005) "Auntie"
- Wendy Wu: Homecoming Warrior (2006) "Grandma Wu"
- Casino Royale (2006) "Madam Wu"
- Year of the Fish (2007) "Mrs. Su"
- Nani (2011) "Nani"
- A Leading Man (2012) "Lo Mei An"
- Now You See Me 2 (2016) "Bu Bu"
- The Jade Pendant (2016) "Madame Pong"
- Lucky Grandma (2019) "Grandma"
- Abominable (2019) "Nai Nai" (voice)
- Shang-Chi and the Legend of the Ten Rings (2021) Waipo

=== Television ===
- International Detective (1960) (TV series) "Suma Hau"
- The Defenders (1961) (TV series) "Parma Gideon"
- Man of the World (1963) (TV series) "Souen"
- That Was The Week That Was (1963) (TV series)
- The Five Foot Nine Show (1964) (TV)
- On Your Own (1965) (TV)
- Dixon of Dock Green (1965) (TV series) "Ana Man Ning"
- The Troubleshooter (1967) (TV series)
- The Subject of Struggle (1971) (TV docudrama) "Wang Kwangmei"
- Window: Bodycount (1973) (TV)
- Chicago Hope (1994) (TV series)
- Crowfoot (1994) (TV series) "Det. Lisa Ishima"
- Byrds of Paradise (1994) (TV series) "Teacher"
- Sisters (1994) (TV series) "Rita Kwan"
- The West Side Waltz (1995) (TV)
- Due South Chinatown "Mrs Lee" (1995 TV Series)
- Under Suspicion (1995) (TV series)
- Fantasy Island (1998) (TV series) "Rita"
- Strong Medicine (2001) (TV series) "Jin Jae"
- The Diary of Ellen Rimbauer (2003) (TV) "Madam Wu"
- Avatar: The Last Airbender (2005) (TV series) "Aunt Wu" (voice)
- Grey's Anatomy (2005) (TV series) "Mrs. Helen Rubenstein"
- The Evidence (2006) (TV series) "Joon Huang"
- Chasing the Hollywood Dream (2005) (TV)
- Hollywood Chinese (2007) (TV documentary)
- Side Order of Life (2007) (TV series) "Mai Thuy"
- The Dream of Red Mansions (original title: Hong Loumeng 红楼梦) (2010) Leading role: "The Dowager Jia (贾母)" 50 episodes – China
- Royal Pains (2012) (TV series) "Mrs. Sesumi"
- Nice Girls Crew (2012) (Web series) "Lady Lee"
- Agents of S.H.I.E.L.D. (2014) (TV series) Lian May
- Getting On (2014) (TV series) "Ruth Lee"
- We Bare Bears (2018) (TV series) "Linda" (voice)
- The Three-Body Problem (TBA)

== Stage work ==
- The Final Ace (1956) "Jennie"; New Lindsey Theatre, London
- The Chinese Classical Theatre (1957) "Compere"; The Drury Lane, London
- Princess and the Swineherd (1957) "Princess"; Arts Theater, London
- Ali Baba (1958) "Princess"; Dundee Repertory Theatre, Doncaster, UK
- The World of Suzie Wong (1959) Title role; Prince of Wales Theatre, London
- Night of 100 Stars (1960) Revue sketch in aid of Actor's orphanage, led by Lord Olivier, London
- The Gimmick (1962) "Gabby Lee"; Criterion Theatre, London
- The Magnolia Tree (1966) "Kesa"; Royal Lyum, Edinburgh
- The Two Mrs. Carrols (1969) Title role; UK tour
- Love For Love (1970) "Mrs. Frail"; Palace Theatre, Watford, UK
- Fanshen (1976) "Hu Hsueh-chen"; The People's Theatre, Boston
- The Orestaia (1977) "Clytemnestra"; The Cambridge Ensemble, Boston
- Agamemnon (1977) "Clytemnestra"; Norfork Prison for Lifers, Massachusetts
- The Scarlet Letter (1977) "Hester Prynne"; The Cambridge Ensemble, Boston. (Best performance, The Real Paper)
- Puntila and Matti (1977) "Eva"; The Cambridge Ensemble, Boston
- Br'er Rabbit (1978) "Sister Terrpin"; The Cambridge Ensemble, Boston
- M. Butterfly (1989) "Suzuki" "Comrade Chin"; Haymarket Theater, Leicester, UK; Shaftesbury Theatre, London
- Madame Mao (1990) "Madame Mao"; Liverpool Playhouse
- Madame Mao's Memories (1990) "Madame Mao"; Latchmere Theatre, London
- The Woman Warrior (1995) "Brave Orchid"; James A. Doolittle Theatre, Los Angeles (LA Drama Critics Circle Award)
- Fishes (1995) "Mother," "Fish"; Taper Lab New Work Festival, Los Angeles
- Golden Child (1996) "Eng Sui-Yong"; The Public Theater, New York
- Half Lives (1996) "woman"; East West Players, Los Angeles
- Golden Child--"Eng Sui-Yong": (1997) South Coast Repertory; (1989) Victoria Theatre, Singapore; (1998) ACT, San Francisco; (1998) The Kennedy Center, Washington, D.C. (nom. Helen Hayes Award); Longacre Theater, New York.
- Fabric (1999) "Auntie Suni"; Singapore Arts Festival
- Wonderland (1999) "Woman"; La Jolla Playhouse, La Jolla, California
- House of Bernarda Alba (2002) "Maria"; Mark Taper Forum, Los Angeles
- China Night (2003–04) Hollywood Bowl
- The Vagina Monologues (2007) "I Was There in the Room"; Aratani Japan Asian Theater, Los Angeles

== Discography ==
- The Ding Dong Song/The Second Spring (第二春) F-11192 (7" single)
- The Chinese Charleston/How Shall I Do It? F-11489 (7" single)
- Buttons and Bows/Woa Yaw Nee F-11595 (7" single)
- Any Old Iron/School in Cheltenham F-11737 (7" single)
- Good Morning, Tokyo (1964 Tokyo Olympic theme for British Television)/I Love A Man (from "Maggie May") F-12039 (7" single)
- The World of Tsai Chin (LP)
- The Western World of Tsai Chin (LP)

== Directing ==
- The Journey (1978) Boston Public Schools
- The Lover (1979) Tufts University
- Crime on Goat Island (1980) Tufts University
- The Tempest (1981) Central Academy of Dramatic Art, Beijing (中央戏剧学院)
- The Seagull (1982) Hong Kong Repertory Theatre
- Twelfth Night (1987) Hong Kong Repertory Theatre

== Teaching ==
- Drama Therapy (1963) Holloway Prison, London
- Theatre workshop for adolescents in Chinatown (1976) Boston
- Acting instructor (1977–1979) Tufts University Drama Department, Medford, Massachusetts
- Workshop for Title VII Theatre Arts Staff (1978) The School Committee of the City of Boston
- Acting instructor (1981) Central Academy of Dramatic Art, Beijing (中央戏剧学院， 表演系78班)
- Master Class (1982) Shanghai Academy of Dramatic Art, Shanghai (上海戏剧学院)

== Awards ==
- Associate Member, Royal Academy of Dramatic Art, London (1964)
- Voted one of London's "Women of the Year" (1964)
- The London Zoo names Chinese leopard "Tsai Chin" (1965)
- The World Who's Who of Women, Cambridge, England (1973)
- Honorary Board of National Center for Women in Performing and Media Arts, Boston (1978)
- Distinguished Service to Profession, Tufts University Alumni Association (1994)
- Los Angeles Drama Critics Circle (1995) The Woman Warrior
- Obie Award (1997) Golden Child
- Helen Hayes Award nominee (1998) Golden Child
- Ammy Lifetime Achievement Awards
- Achievement Award (2007) Chinese Performing Arts Foundation, San Francisco
