= ESSE Purse Museum =

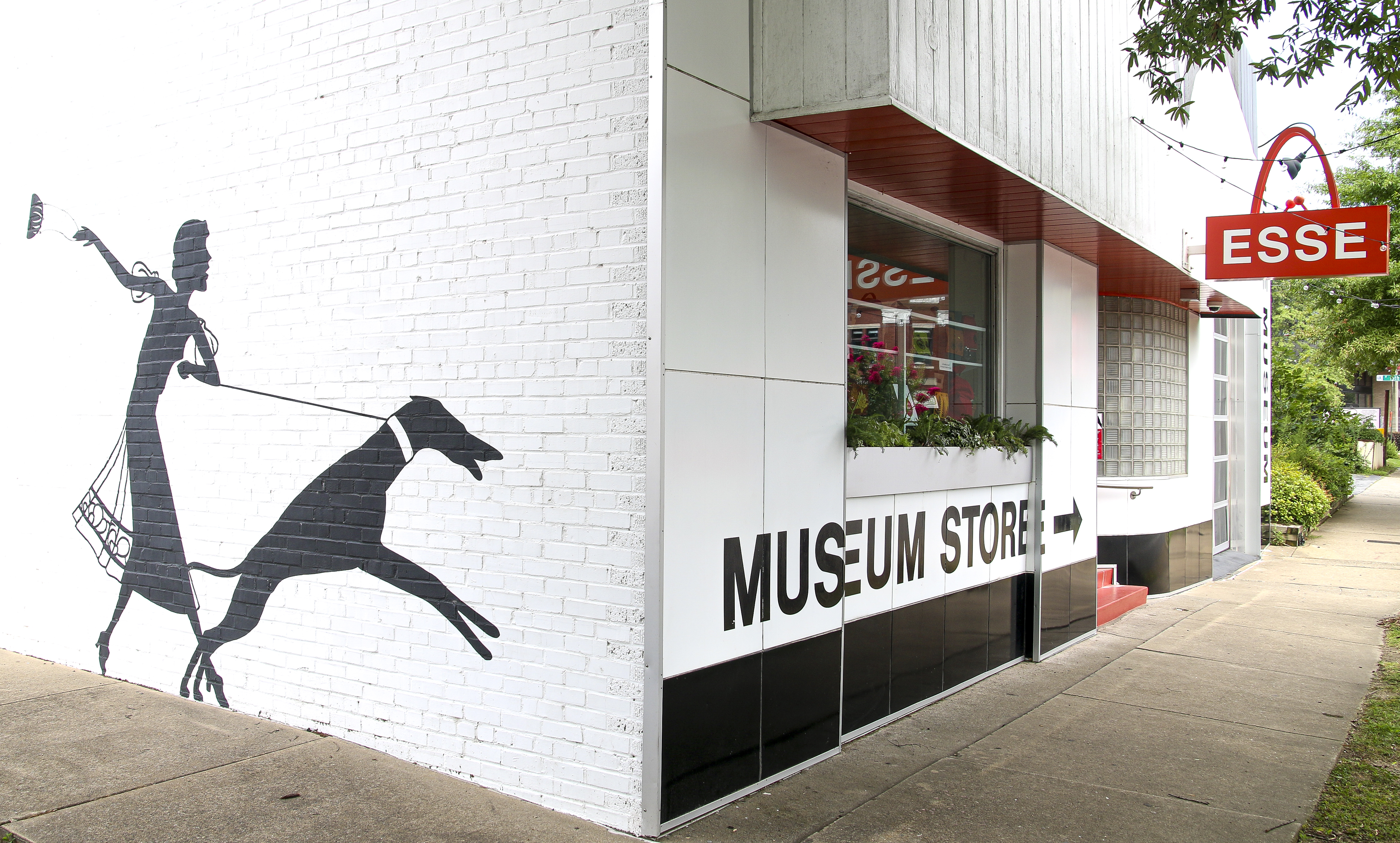
- Established: 2013
- Location: 1510 Main Street; Little Rock, Arkansas; Southern United States
- Coordinates: 34°44′02″N 92°16′24″W
- Type: Fashion Museum
- Website: essepursemuseum.com

The ESSE Purse Museum is a museum located in Little Rock, Arkansas featuring women's handbags, and the day-to-day items carried in them, illustrating the stories of American women's lives during the 1900s. Special topic exhibits are hosted, and the museum has a gift shop. The museum's name is derived from the Latin infinitive for "to be".

== History ==
The museum originated from the founder's interest in folk art. In 2006, her personal collection of thousands of handbags was organized into a traveling exhibition that toured the United States through 2011. Following the tour, the collection was put on display in a historic building in Little Rock's South Main ("SoMa") district.

== Exhibits ==
The permanent exhibits showcase handbags that most women owned from the early 1900s through 1999, giving glimpses into their lives. Display cases set up by decade show the styles of purses women carried and their contents, reflecting the events of each decade and illustrating how war, fashion, and economics influenced the style and function of purses. Special exhibits have included vintage Barbie dolls (2014), a local artist's series of paintings of women and their purses (2017), images and objects from African American women, 1891–1987 (2017), and paper dresses from the 1960s (2018).

== Gallery ==
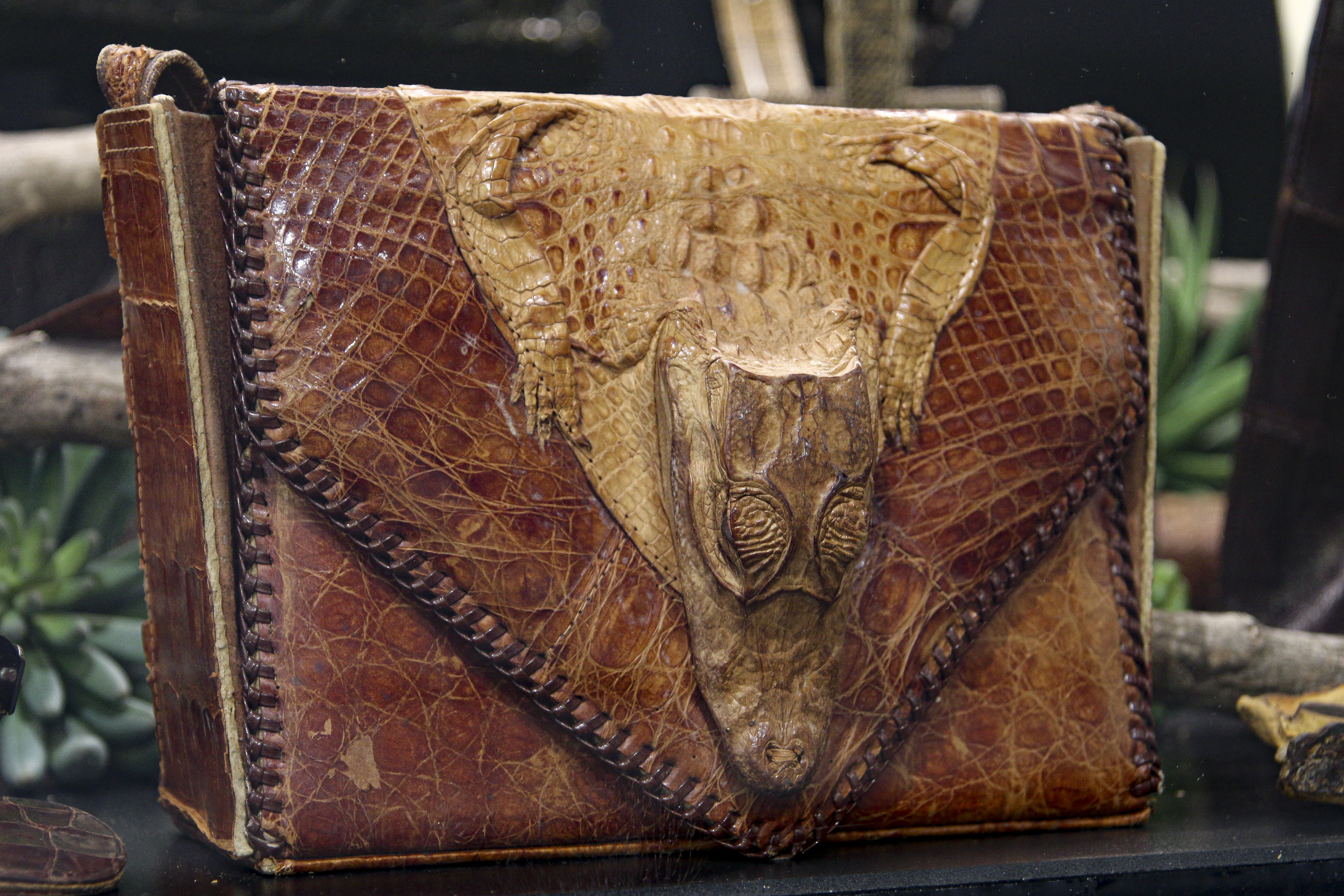
Reptile skin purse

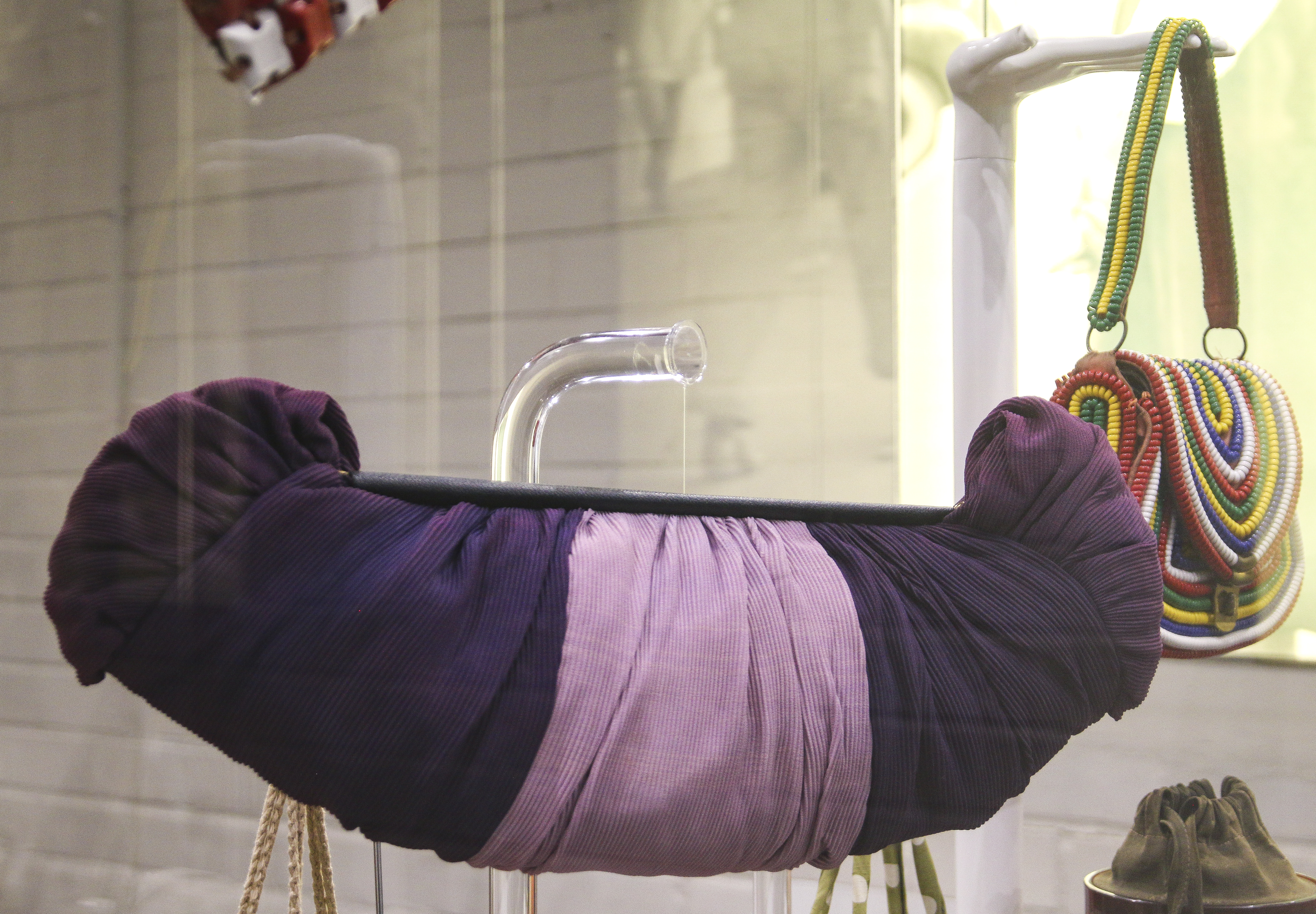
Fabric purse

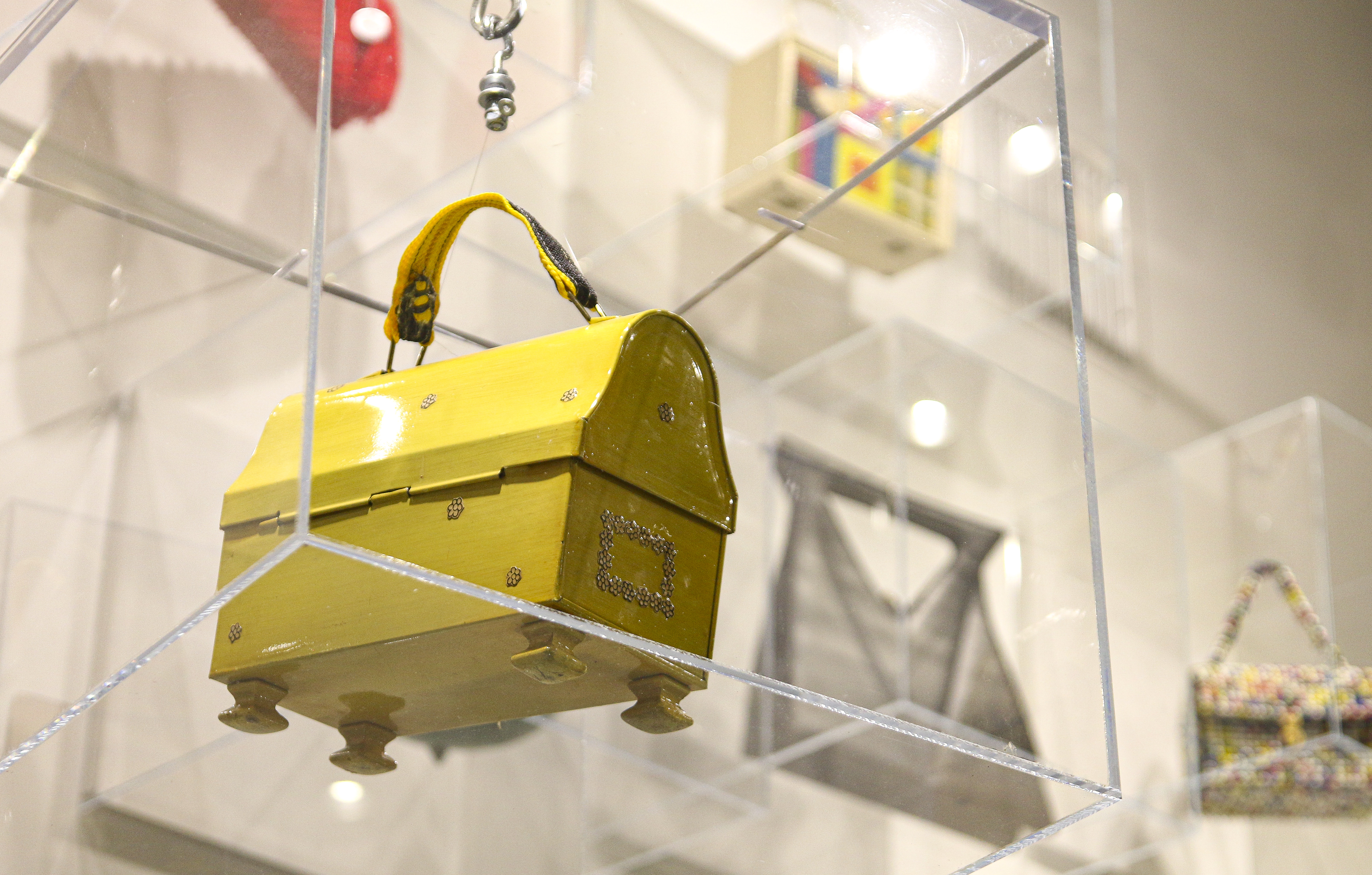
Metal purse

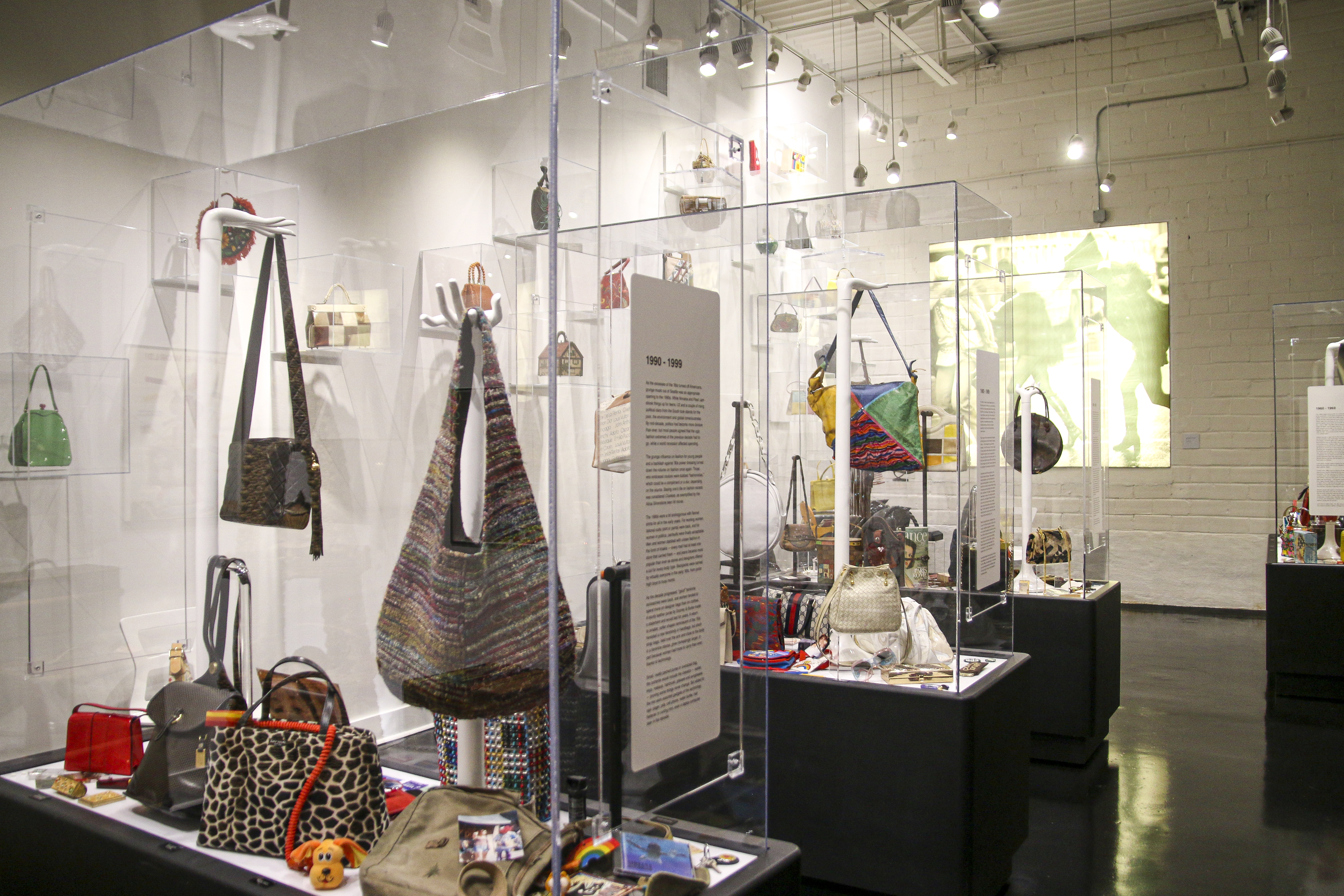
Permanent exhibit space

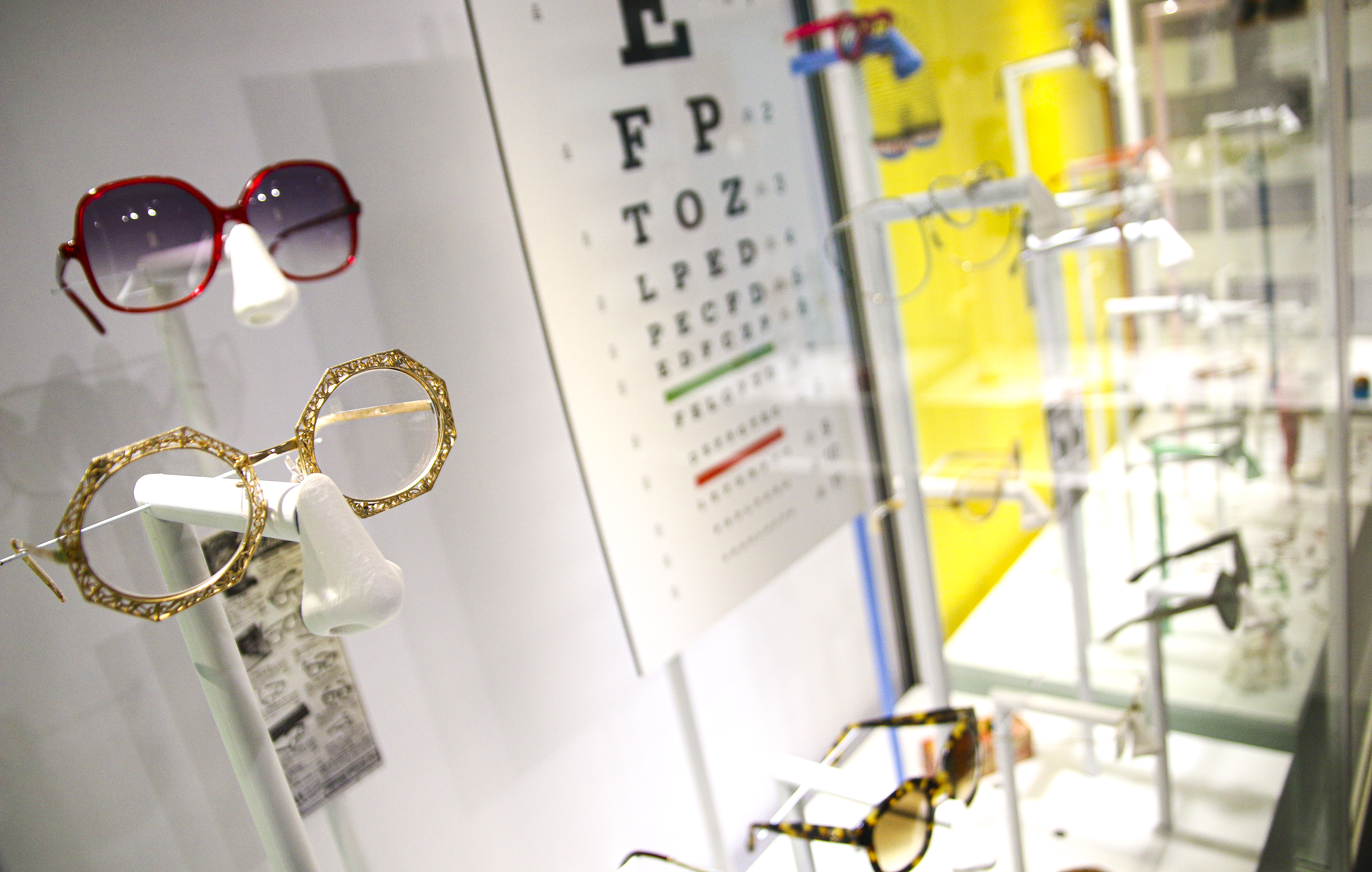
Temporary exhibit about eyewear (July 2020)

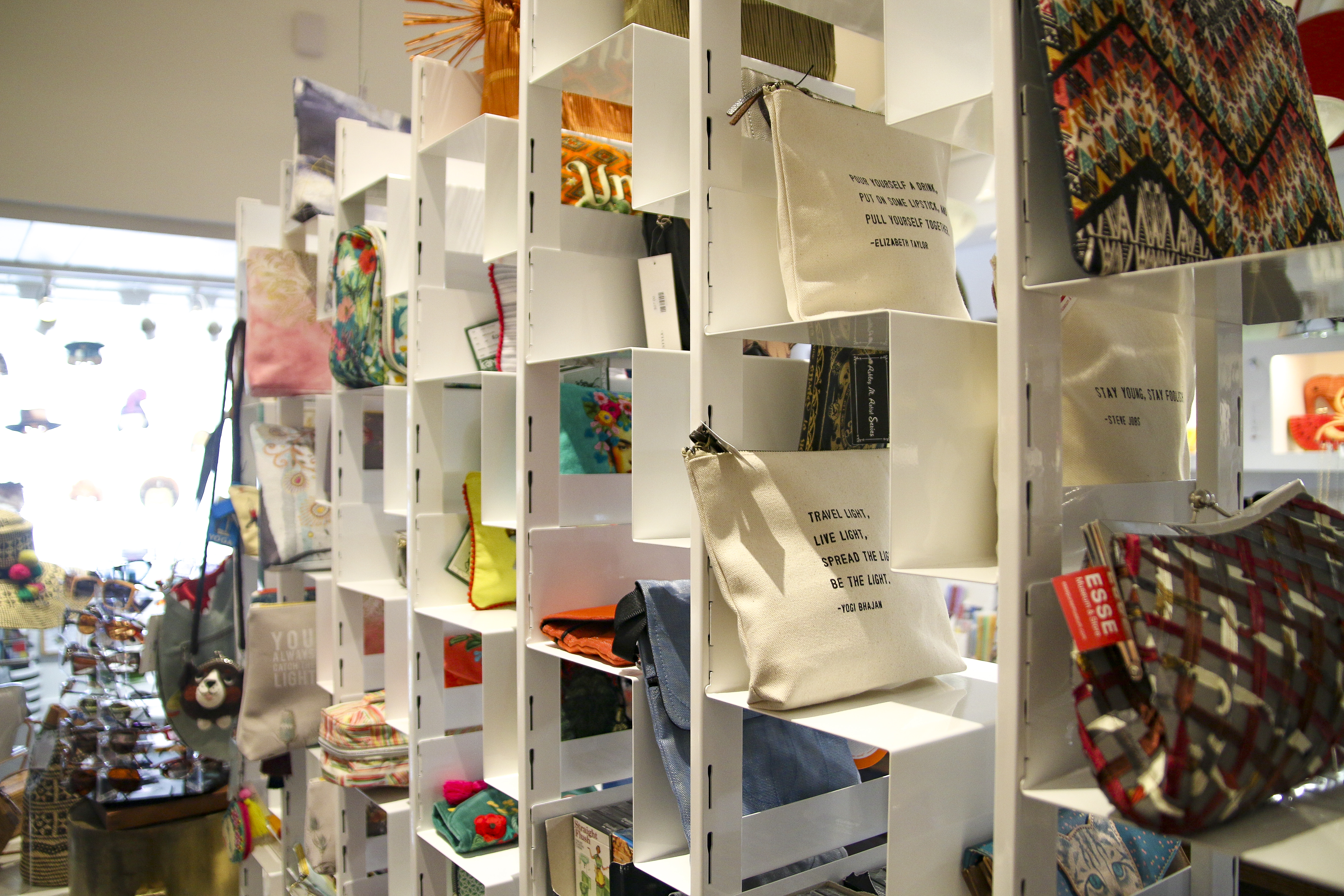
Museum store

== See also ==
- Simone Handbag Museum in Seoul, South Korea
- Museum of Bags and Purses in Amsterdam, Netherlands
- Handbag collecting
