= Simone Handbag Museum =

Museum in Seul, South Korea

Coordinates: 37.5190°N 127.0230°E

The Simone Handbag Museum in Seoul, South Korea, is a museum dedicated to handbags.

== History ==
The museum opened on 19 July 2012 in Seoul's Gangnam District. The collection was established by Kenny Park, founder and CEO of Simone Handbags, and was assembled and curated by Judith Clark, Professor of Fashion and Museology at the London College of Fashion. The collection was assembled at a cost of £1 million.

Park used the opening of the museum to announce a year later the launch of his own handbag brand, 0914.

== Description ==
300 bags are on display at the museum, dating from 1550 to the present day. The museum is divided into two halves, Twentieth Century and Contemporary, and Historic (1500–1900). Most of the handbags are European in origin, with some contemporary bags from the United States. Bespoke mannequins at the museum have been designed to draw the visitors' attention to the bags on display. Two of the mannequins were designed by the milliner Stephen Jones. The most expensive item on display is a 1998 red alligator skin Birkin.

The museum is housed in a 10-story building called Bagstage which is shaped like a handbag "with two 'straps' for a 'handle' on the roof". Bagstage also incorporates a shop selling bag materials, workshops where new Korean designers can work rent-free, a section where craftsmen will produce bags and two shops.

The admission fee is $5. In 2018, 4,000 people visited the museum.

== See also ==
- ESSE Purse Museum in Little Rock, Arkansas, USA
- Museum of Bags and Purses in Amsterdam, Netherlands
- Handbag collecting
