= Mr Chow =

Upscale Chinese restaurant chain

- Type: Private
- Industry: Restaurant
- Founded: February 14, 1968
- Founder: Michael Chow
- Headquarters: New York City, United States
- Area served: United States, Europe
- Products: Chinese cuisine
- Owner: Michael Chow

Mr Chow is a series of upscale Chinese restaurants founded by British-Chinese restaurateur Michael Chow. There are locations in London, New York, Beverly Hills, and Miami.

== History ==
In the 1960s, London was experiencing a cultural revolution. Michael Chow, son of Chinese Peking Opera Grand Master, Zhou Xinfang, studied art in London before embarking upon a business career in parallel to his acting career. On February 14, 1968, Chow opened the first Mr Chow at an old Knightsbridge curry house in London. The waiters were Italian and there weren't any chopsticks, "it was like telling people the world was square, he said. Soon, The Beatles frequented the restaurant. Other famous diners included Federico Fellini, Frank Sinatra and Jeanne Moreau.

In 1974, a second location was opened in Beverly Hills, California, US. Clint Eastwood and Eartha Kitt came to the launch; Billy Wilder, Anjelica Huston and Jack Nicholson became regulars.

In 1979, a third Mr Chow was opened in Midtown Manhattan at 57th Street, which became a hot spot for creative luminaries in the 1980s. "Suddenly it was like a repeat of the Sixties London happening in New York — the city was at the epicentre of art world, and the fashion world... Andy [Warhol] started coming in with Julian [Schnabel], Jean-Michel [Basquiat], his girlfriend Madonna and Keith [Haring]," Chow recalled.

In 1999, Chow opened Eurochow, a restaurant located in a $4-million restoration of a landmark domed building in Westwood Village neighborhood of Los Angeles, that closed by 2007.

In 2006, the fourth Mr Chow opened in the Tribeca neighborhood of Manhattan.

In 2009, a location opened in Miami Beach, Florida at the W Hotel South Beach.

In 2012, a location opened in Malibu, California at the Malibu Country Mart on New Year's Eve. This restaurant closed on January 2, 2020.

In 2016, a Mr Chow opened at Caesars Palace in Las Vegas. This location closed on May 17, 2025.

== Reception ==
Michael Chow has said the Mr Chow restaurants have always been underlined by a desire and need to promote Chinese culture. "China always has been a great, great nation", Chow stated in a Wall Street Journal interview and added, "Chinese people — I like them. What can I say?"

Alan Richman of GQ Magazine, described the experience at Mr Chow as one "that cannot be defined by customary standards but must be appreciated for its sheer fabulousness." The New York Times critic Frank Bruni gave Mr Chow Tribeca zero stars, and New York magazine critic Adam Platt gave it a similarly dismal review. The goal of his restaurant design is to be fancy and expensive, being quoted as saying "Expensive is important. Very important."

Despite the longevity of his restaurants, Chow believes Mr Chow has never had the culinary recognition it deserves. In an interview with The Sunday Telegraph in 2011, Chow stated:

"It's like the cliché about all blondes being dumb. Because we're so glamorous and so many famous people come to us, the critics would rather point to some little greasy spoon and say, 'Oh isn't the food marvellous.' But we wouldn't have survived for 43 years if the food were no good. And what you find is that most critics don't study Chinese food in the way that they study French wine, so their only reference is casual food like takeaway."

== See also ==
- List of Chinese restaurants
- A.k.a. Mr. Chow
