= Women's Action Coalition =

Feminist organization

- Abbreviation: WAC
- Formation: January 28, 1992
- Founded at: New York City, United States
- Type: Feminist open-alliance
- Purpose: To address issues of women's rights through direct action.
- Headquarters: New York City
- Region served: United States; Canada; Europe
- Methods: Protests, sit-ins, educational campaigns, civil disobedience

The Women's Action Coalition (WAC) was a feminist open-alliance that sought to address issues of women's rights through direct action. WAC was founded in New York City in 1992 and inspired the formation of subsequent chapters in various other US cities as well as in Canada and Europe. Inspired by the AIDS Coalition to Unleash Power (ACT UP) and Women's Health Action and Mobilization (WHAM), WAC conducted protests, sit-ins, and educational campaigns and viewed civil disobedience as a mode of direct action.

The mission of the groups is to make a change and take action against the barriers restraining the rights of women. There are Women's Action Coalition groups located all over the world, although many are located in the United States in the cities of Boston, San Francisco, Houston, and Los Angeles. There are also groups located in Europe and Canada.

== New York ==
On January 28, 1992 a group of 75 to 150 women came together in New York City to talk about their frustration with their issues concerning the rights of women. They named this meeting "Women Strategizing in the 90's." The immediate reason for the meeting was to discuss their anger that Clarence Thomas was named Supreme Court Justice even after Anita Hill's testimony that Thomas had assaulted her. The women decided to start a feminist activist group called The Women's Action Coalition." They planned on modeling their group after the AIDS activist group ACT-UP and the Women's Health Action Coalition." Their first action took place six days after that meeting at a sexual assault trial involving students from St. John's University." Their logo was a blue dot after the blue dot the media would put over the rape victims face when displayed on television" Their members founded the Drum Core which performed at all of their action movements. They also came up with the slogan "Let women define rape!" " By the second meeting they had 300 members. " They demonstrated at many other rape trials."

== Chicago ==
A WAC group was founded in Chicago, but did not last for a great deal of time. It was founded in 1992 and had fallen apart by 1994. Men were not allowed to attend the meetings but were allowed to participate all other WAC actions. Although the group was in commission for only two years the impact that they left was great. They took action by handing out free condoms and also pamphlets on how to have safe sex. They placed coffins in the streets which held the stories of women who had been murdered, and used a billboard and signed postcards to express the effects domestic violence and breast cancer have on women. Each of the WAC's all over the world included a Drum Core, which is considered an important part of the WAC. The Drum Core participates in WAC actions and all other activities.

== San Francisco ==
The Women's Action Coalition of San Francisco was founded in August 1992. By 1992 there were about five hundred members, meeting at the Southern Exposure Gallery and speak about future creative ways they could implement their actions towards the importance of the rights of women. They started a marathon run in favor of the rights of women, and letter writing campaigns, rallies, marches, guerrilla postering, spray-painting, and contributing to the defense of abortion clinics. Their stamina of direct-action lasted for about a year. Their actions saved the community from Governor Pete Wilson's plan to cut aid to families who had dependent children. After the first year the number of members began to decline, falling to about 50 members.They were forced to move their meeting location to a small office space that was shared by another feminist group. Nonetheless, after a few months the WAC of San Francisco was unable to pay the rent and became non-existent by 1994s.

== Records ==
The rise and fall of The Women's Action Coalitions is considered part of the third wave of feminism. Most of the records are from the first WAC, WAC of New York. The files of the WAC from other cities are scattered. Most of the records date from 1992 through 1993. The coalition's records contain their action, administrative, and subject files. They also contain T-shirts and stickers that they created and used. There are also video recordings of the actions that took place.
