= Pat Hartley =

American actress director and producer

Pat Harley
- Born: Patricia Hartley; November 19, 1945 (age 80)
- Occupations: Actress; film director; film producer
- Spouse: Dick Fontaine
- Children: Smokey Fontaine

Patricia "Pat" Hartley (born November 19, 1945) is an American actress, filmmaker, and producer. She became associated with Pop artist Andy Warhol's Factory in the mid-1960s, appearing in several of his underground films, including Prison (1965), and My Hustler II (1965). She subsequently appeared in the films Ciao! Manhattan (1972), Rainbow Bridge (1972), and Absolute Beginners (1986).

In the 1980s, Hartley and her husband, filmmaker Dick Fontaine, founded Grapevine Pictures in New York City. They produced the documentary I Heard It Through the Grapevine (1982) and Art Blakey: The Jazz Messenger (1988). Hartley has also directed, choreographed, and written music videos for musicians including Afrika Bambaataa, Johnny Rotten, and Keith LeBlanc.

== Early life ==
Pat Hartley was born in New York City in 1945. She is of Hungarian and Jewish descent.

had initially planned to attend Hunter College, but after failing her high school classes, she was instead scheduled to attend evening classes. During the summer, Hartley and a friend began spending time in Greenwich Village, where they encountered filmmaker Chuck Wein at the Right Bank and later at bars and clubs including Stanley's Bar and the Dom. Wein subsequently introduced Hartley to Pop artist Andy Warhol at the Factory in 1965.

Her early experiences in Greenwich Village and the sexual openness she encountered there meant that the atmosphere at the Factory did not initially shock her. She later recalled the Factory as a place where people came to pursue their own interests and described the environment as one in which she felt that "a lot of things were going to happen." Hartley had wanted to become a film actress and the Factory provided an opportunity to pursue that ambition.

== Career ==
Hartley filmed a Screen Test at the Factory in the fall of 1965, and subsequently appeared in two other Warhol films that year. Hartley appeared in Prison alongside Bibbe Hansen, Sedgwick, and Dorothy Dean. She also appeared in My Hustler II (Ingrid in Apartment), a continuation of Warhol's My Hustler. The film featured Hartley alongside Paul America, Malanga, Billy Name, Rene Ricard, and others.

Hartley's presence at the Factory was notable in the context of Warhol's predominantly white circle of performers. She was among a small number of Black performers who appeared in his films during the 1960s, alongside figures including Dorothy Dean, Abigail Rosen, Rufus Collins, and Donyale Luna.

Hartley continued working in film outside Warhol's productions. She appeared in Ciao! Manhattan, the semi-fictional film centered on Sedgwick. Production began in 1967, and the film was released in 1972.

In 1971, Hartley starred in Wein's Rainbow Bridge with her friend, musician Jimi Hendrix. The film following Hartley, a model who travels from San Diego, California, to an occult center on the island of Maui, Hawaii.

Hartley's career increasingly shifted toward documentary filmmaking. She collaborated with British documentary filmmaker Dick Fontaine, whom she later married, and the two established Grapevine Pictures in New York in the early 1980s. The company specialized in documentary, music, and original drama productions.

Their first major collaboration was I Heard It Through the Grapevine (1982), a documentary following writer and activist James Baldwin as he revisited places associated with the civil rights movement approximately two decades after the events. The film takes Baldwin to locations including Birmingham, Selma, Atlanta, St. Augustine, and Newark, where he reflects on the movement and its aftermath. Hartley's collaboration with Baldwin developed from her meeting him while she was living in London.

Hartley and Fontaine subsequently made Art Blakey: The Jazz Messenger (1988), a documentary portrait of jazz drummer and bandleader Art Blakey. The film includes interviews and performances involving Blakey and musicians associated with the Jazz Messengers, including Dizzy Gillespie, Wynton Marsalis, and Wayne Shorter.

Hartley also worked in music video production. She wrote, choreographed, and co-directed videos for artists associated with Island Records, Tommy Boy Records, and Blue Note Records. Among her projects was the music video for "No Sell Out" (1983) by Keith LeBlanc, as well as "World Destruction" (1984) by Afrika Bambaataa and Johnny Rotten.

Hartley appeared in Julien Temple's musical film Absolute Beginners (1986).

Hartley has lectured at New York University and taught documentary filmmaking at the National Film and Television School in England. She has also worked with students in New York City Public Schools.

== Personal life ==
Hartley married British filmmaker Dick Fontaine. In 1972, the couple had a son, Smokey Fontaine, who became a writer, music critic, and editor. He was named after Hartley's friend, singer Smokey Robinson.

== Filmography ==
=== Film ===
Year	Title	Role	Notes
1965	Screen Test	Herself	Directed by Andy Warhol
1965	Prison	Herself	Directed by Andy Warhol
1965	My Hustler II	Herself	Directed by Andy Warhol
1970	Double Pisces, Scorpio Rising	Herself	Directed by Dick Fontaine
1971	Rainbow Bridge	Pat	Directed by Chuck Wein
1972	Ciao! Manhattan	Yoli	Directed by Chuck Wein, John Palmer, and David Weisman
1973	Jimi Hendrix	Herself	Documentary
1982	I Heard It Through the Grapevine	Herself	Co-directed and co-produced with Dick Fontaine
1986	Absolute Beginners	Ms. Cool Snr	Directed by Julien Temple
1988	Art Blakey: The Jazz Messenger	Herself	Co-directed and co-produced with Dick Fontaine
1994	Hung Up	Herself	Short film; directed by Hartley

=== Music videos ===
Year	Artist	Title	Role
1983	Keith LeBlanc	"No Sell Out"	Director
1984	Afrika Bambaataa	"World Destruction"	Director / choreographer
