= Bima Stagg =

- Born: Christopher Louis Stagg; May 3, 1945; United States
- Died: October 21, 2021 (aged 76); Los Angeles, California, U.S.
- Other name: Kipp Stagg
- Occupations: Screenwriter, actor, producer
- Years active: 1965–2021
- Known for: Inside, Stander, The Stud, Andy Warhol films

Bima Stagg (born Christopher Louis Stagg; May 3, 1945 – October 21, 2021), credited professionally as Kipp Stagg during his early career, was an American screenwriter, actor, and producer based in Los Angeles, California, and Cape Town, South Africa. He began his artistic career appearing in Andy Warhol's early underground films before writing feature screenplays, including The Stud (1978), Inside (1996), and Stander (2003).

== Early life and Warhol collaboration ==
While attending Columbia University in New York City during the mid-1960s, Stagg met artist Andy Warhol and became associated with The Factory. Under the name Kipp Stagg, he appeared alongside Edie Sedgwick and Chuck Wein in Warhol's 1965 experimental film Beauty No. 1. Shot from a fixed camera angle, the film features Sedgwick and Stagg on a bed engaging in ad-libbed conversation while Wein speaks off-camera. Beauty No. 1 served as the precursor to Beauty No. 2, in which Gino Piserchio replaced Stagg. The original film negative for Beauty No. 1 is preserved at the Andy Warhol Museum.

During this period, Stagg also appeared in several of Warhol's silent Screen Tests. In 2021, his Screen Test alongside Edie Sedgwick was featured in the curated exhibition Andy Warhol: Photo Factory presented by NeueHouse and Fotografiska in collaboration with Hedges Projects.

== Screenwriting career ==
=== Early screenplays (1970s–1980s) ===
Stagg wrote the screenplay for the 1976 South African crime thriller Death of a Snowman (released in the U.S. as Soul Patrol), in which he also acted. In 1978, he co-wrote the screenplay adaptation for The Stud alongside Jackie Collins (adapting her 1969 novel). Starring Joan Collins (the author's sister), the low-budget film achieved significant commercial success at the international box office and served as a major career comeback vehicle for Collins, laying the foundation for her casting as Alexis Carrington in Dynasty. In 1987, he wrote the screenplay for the post-apocalyptic film Survivor.

=== Inside (1996) ===
Stagg wrote the screenplay for Inside (1996), a political drama directed by Arthur Penn and starring Nigel Hawthorne, Eric Stoltz, and Louis Gossett Jr. Set in South Africa during the apartheid era, the story centers on the interrogation of a political prisoner. The film premiered on Showtime and screened at the Cannes Film Festival and Toronto International Film Festival. For his script, Stagg received the 1997 PEN Center USA West Literary Award for Best Screenplay.

=== Stander (2003) ===
Stagg authored the screenplay for Stander (2003), a biographical crime film directed by Bronwen Hughes and starring Thomas Jane. The film details the life of Andre Stander, a Johannesburg police captain who led a gang of bank robbers during the late 1970s. Stagg also served as a co-producer on the film.

== Filmography ==
=== Film ===
Year	Title	Credit	Notes
1965	Beauty No. 1	Actor	Experimental film by Andy Warhol; as Kipp Stagg
1965–1966	Screen Tests	Actor	Directed by Andy Warhol
1976	Death of a Snowman	Co-writer, actor	Also released as Soul Patrol
1978	The Stud	Co-writer	Screenplay adaptation of novel by Jackie Collins
1987	Survivor	Writer, actor	
1996	Inside	Writer	Directed by Arthur Penn; PEN West Literary Award winner
2003	Stander	Writer, co-producer	Directed by Bronwen Hughes
