= A, A Novel =

1968 book by Andy Warhol

a: A Novel
- Cover of the first edition
- Author: Andy Warhol
- Language: English
- Genre: Novel
- Publisher: Grove Press
- Publication date: 1968
- Publication place: United States
- Media type: Print (hardcover)
- Pages: 451 p.

a, also known as a: A Novel, is a 1968 book by the American artist Andy Warhol published by Grove Press. It is a nearly word-for-word transcription of tapes recorded by Warhol and Ondine over a two-year period in 1965–1967.

== Background ==
a: A Novel was the second of several publishing projects by Pop artist Andy Warhol produced in his lifetime. Warhol wanted to be a writer but, much like his film work, spontaneous performances and an explicit lack of editing were used as a device. Warhol wanted to write a "bad" novel, "because doing something the wrong way always opens doors".

During the summer of 1965, Warhol began taping his new superstar Ondine. Four typists were employed to transcribe the Warhol/Ondine tapes. Two high school girls were hired to work on some of the tapes. When one girl's mother heard what they were listening to she threw out the tape, losing several hours of conversation. Later, Maureen Tucker, the drummer for the Velvet Underground, was an expert typist. However, she refused to transcribe the swear words and left them out. All of the hired typists transcribed the dialogue differently, some identifying the speakers, others not. The editor for a, A Novel, Billy Name, preserved the transcripts as is, with every typo and inconsistent character identification, and even moving from two column pages to single-column based on each typist's style. The final printed version was identical to the typed manuscripts.

== Content ==
a: A Novel, Warhol's knowing response to James Joyce's Ulysses, was intended as an uninterrupted twenty-four hours in the life of Ondine, an actor who was famous mostly as a Factory fixture, Warhol film superstar and devoted amphetamine user. Warhol told the press: "I followed an actor, Ondine, for 24 hours and taped 'everything—everywhere he went ... He talked with a hundred or so people."

A taped conversation between Warhol and Ondine, the book was actually recorded over a few separate days, during a two-year period. The first recording probably took place on Friday, August 13, 1965 (based on a statement on page 17 by Ondine that he was going to see the Beatles the next Wednesday). The book is a verbatim printing of the typed manuscripts and contains every typo, abbreviation and inconsistency that the typists produced from the twenty-four tapes (each chapter is named for its respective tape and side, from "1/ 1" to "24/ 2"). Ondine's monologues and disjointed conversations are further fragmented by Warhol's insistence on maintaining a purity of the transcriptions.

== Cast ==
The book is a roman à clef, meaning that the fictional characters are thinly disguised actual persons. The "cast" is itemized in the glossary written by Victor Bockris in the 1998 paperback edition. A run-down of the major characters in the book are:

- Ondine is Robert Olivo, a Warhol superstar.
- Drella is Warhol himself (he was nicknamed by Lou Reed as "Drella" because Reed felt it fit both sides of Warhol's persona, being a combination of Cinderella and Dracula).
- Steve is Stephen Shore, a photographer who worked with Billy Name.
- Paul is Paul Morrissey, who had just joined the group and would eventually become the director of Warhol's later films.
- Lucky L is Paul America, newly popular in the Factory crowd for starring in My Hustler.
- Gerard Malanga was the star of many Warhol films, and is the only person whose real name is used in the book.
- Taxine or "Taxi" is Edie Sedgwick, the great female Warhol superstar. a, A novel was the beginning of the end of their relationship.
- Ingrid is Ingrid Superstar, a Warhol Superstar, who was brought to the Factory to "replace" Edie in late 1965.
- Rink or "Rink Crawl" is Chuck Wein, responsible for bringing both Edie and Ingrid to the Factory.
- Irving Du Ball is Lester Persky, a film producer.
- Moxanne is Genevieve Charbon, a French actress who Edie met in Paris that year.
- Rotten Rita is Kenneth Rapp, who, with Ondine and Billy Name, made up the "A-heads Trio". Rita was also known as the Mayor, like Ondine was known as the Pope.
- The Duchess is Brigid Polk, whose real name was Brigid Berlin. She would be Warhol's companion for the rest of his life, although he did not take part in her only conversation in the book.
- Billy Name is Billy Linich, a photographer who worked closely with Stephen Shore. He was also the designer of the Factory.
- Do Do or "Do Do Mae Doome" is Dorothy Dean. She worked at The New Yorker in the 60s.
- The Sugar Plum Fairy is Joe Campbell, who starred in My Hustler and Nude Restaurant.
- Ron Via is Ronnie Vial, a member of the underground.
- Oxydol is Olympio Vasconzalez, who starred in Conquest of the Universe with Ondine.
- Lou is Lou Reed of the Velvet Underground, whose album cover Warhol created.

== Translations ==
The first and last sections of a: A novel have been translated into Galician by Alberte Pagán.

== Publication ==
The book was published by Grove Press in November 1968.

Warhol stated that the title "a" stands for nothing, but his studio manager, Paul Morrissey said it "stands for amphetamine ... the stuff people take. Makes you talk." In his glossary for the 1998 edition of a: A Novel, Victor Bockris cites Billy Name as the source for the title; "a" refers to both amphetamine use and as an homage to e. e. cummings. The title in both editions published by Grove Press in 1969 and 1998 use the a: A Novel format.

== Critical reception ==
Randy Fields of The Charlotte Observer wrote: "'A' is an experience. It is not a novel. It is more a perverted happening than anything else. … It's supposed to be exciting; It's dull and boring. The characters are supposed to be way out interesting full of life beautiful people. They're dull and almost pathetic and hopelessly lost in a world they can't face If anything can redeem.

Donald Stanley of the San Francisco Examiner wrote: "A" is outrageous enough to last until Warhol finishes another movie or discovers a next step. Music? In the meantime, his novel has one advantage over the competition: You can start anywhere at random and read forward or leaf backward and it all comes out the same."

John Raymond of The Atlanta Journal-Constitution wrote: "a" is very much like Andy Warhol's movies, especially "The Chelsea Girls" ... All very interesting. Well, not all—most of it, in fact, is dull. But the experiment, while maybe not original, is worthwhile."
