= Beauty No. 1 =

- Directed by: Andy Warhol
- Written by: Chuck Wein
- Starring: Edie Sedgwick; Kipp Stagg; Chuck Wein
- Release date: 1965
- Running time: 70 minutes
- Country: United States
- Language: English

Beauty No. 1 (originally titled Beauty) is a 1965 American underground experimental film directed by Andy Warhol. Shot in black-and-white 16mm, the film stars Edie Sedgwick, Kipp Stagg (later known as Bima Stagg), and Chuck Wein. It is the precursor to Warhol's better-known follow-up, Beauty No. 2.

== Synopsis ==
The film maintains a stationary single-shot camera perspective focused on a bed where Edie Sedgwick, dressed in a bra and panties, and Kipp Stagg, wearing jockey shorts, engage in light kissing and flirting. Off-camera, Chuck Wein speaks to Sedgwick, asking questions designed to provoke and frustrate her while Stagg remains silent and uncommunicative with Wein. The conversation is unscripted and ad-libbed throughout the performance.

== Production and exhibition history ==
Filmed in early 1965 at The Factory in New York City, Beauty No. 1 was among Warhol's early screen projects featuring Edie Sedgwick. Shortly after filming, Warhol re-shot the concept under the title Beauty No. 2, substituting Gino Piserchio into the role on the bed alongside Sedgwick while retaining Wein's off-camera voice.

The original 16mm film negative is preserved within the permanent collection of the Andy Warhol Museum in Pittsburgh, Pennsylvania.

Archival 16mm prints from Warhol's 1965–1966 Factory period, including screen test footage featuring Sedgwick and Stagg, have been featured in major retrospective exhibitions curated by Hedges Projects. These include the 2021 Andy Warhol: Photo Factory exhibition at NeueHouse Hollywood and Fotografiska, as well as the 2023 Andy Warhol's MACHO exhibition presented at Dries Van Noten in Los Angeles.

== See also ==
- List of American films of 1965
- Andy Warhol filmography
