= Paul America =

American actor (1944–1982)

- Paul America being filmed for one of Andy Warhol's Screen Tests in 1965
- Born: Paul Johnson; February 25, 1944; New Jersey, U.S.
- Died: October 19, 1982 (aged 38); Ormond Beach, Florida, U.S.
- Occupation: Film actor

Paul Johnson (February 25, 1944 – October 19, 1982), better known as Paul America, was an American actor who was a member of Andy Warhol's Superstars. He starred in one Warhol-directed film, My Hustler (1965), and also appeared in Edie Sedgwick's final film Ciao! Manhattan (1972).

== Warhol years ==
According to America, he met artist Andy Warhol at Ondine, a New York City discotheque in mid-1965. Warhol found America to be "unbelievably good looking - like a comic strip drawing of Mr. America, clean cut, handsome, very symmetrical". Warhol invited America back to his studio called The Factory located at 231 East 47th Street. America ended up moving into the studio and was eventually christened "Paul America" by Warhol. The name may have derived from Paul's former residence, the Hotel America. America later said he often had problems with the name given:

I went through a period of paranoia about it. I mean, every time I saw that word - and it's everywhere - I related it to myself. The country's problems were my problems. I think that if I weren't called Paul America it would have been easier for me to register in hotels.

In 1965, America was cast as the lead character in My Hustler, written by Chuck Wein. My Hustler was the first of Warhol's experimental films to utilize camera movements and to feature a loosely structured plot. The film was shot over the Labor Day weekend in 1965 on Fire Island for $500. It premiered at the Hudson Theater on July 10, 1967, and became Warhol's first financially successful film. The role propelled America to fame and would eventually earn him the title of gay icon. In an interview with The New York Times shortly after the film was released, America claimed he had "was completely unaware of what 'My Hustler' was all about. They didn't tell me. I was on LSD the whole time, and I thought I was just going through some practice motions." He added that the success of the film, along with his constant use of LSD, had made him paranoid: "... I saw cameras coming at me everywhere I went. Even the Con Ed men were shooting me from down in their manholes." America appeared in only two other films for Warhol, neither of which were publicly released. Two sequels followed My Hustler entitled My Hustler: In Apartment and My Hustler: Ingrid. He also had a role in Dan Williams's silent film Harold Stevenson, that also featured Gerard Malanga, Stevenson, and Edie Sedgwick.

While America's work at the Factory was limited, his good looks and generally docile nature made him a popular staple. Ondine, another Factory regular during the 1960s who had a sexual relationship with him, described America as "... the personification of total sexual satisfaction. ... Just beautifully vapid. He was a wonderful creature. Anybody who wanted anything from Paul could get it. He was there to satisfy. And he did." At various points, America had sexual relationships with curator Henry Geldzahler (with whom he lived briefly), Edie Sedgwick and Sedgwick's friend Chuck Wein.

During his years at the Factory, America became addicted to heroin and speed. He eventually stopped using heroin but continued using speed. The drug altered his behavior and he would become paranoid and sometimes violent. America's My Hustler co-star Genevieve Charbin remembered an incident when America tried to rob her apartment and used a plumber's wrench to threaten her. While Charbin watched, America rifled through Charbin's possessions looking for money but could only find old, worthless checks. When Charbin pointed out the checks were worthless, America took a radio and stalked out of her apartment. Henry Geldzahler later recalled that America broke into his apartment and stole a landscape by Roy Lichtenstein and several Warhol pieces that photographer Billy Name left with Geldzahler after he left the Factory in 1970. America eventually left the Factory around 1967.

== Later years and death ==
Shortly after leaving the Factory, America hired a lawyer in order to persuade Warhol to pay him for his role in My Hustler, which had become Warhol's first commercially successful film. Warhol, who never paid the actors who appeared in his films, eventually agreed to pay America $1,000 in several installments. In a December 1967 article in The New York Times, America said he had received $500 from Warhol.

Later that year, America was cast opposite Edie Sedgwick in John Palmer and David Weisman's film Ciao! Manhattan (1972). The film began shooting in April 1967 but production was halted after America abruptly left during filming. While shooting a scene at the Pan Am Building in which America drops Jane Holzer off, he became frustrated after numerous takes and simply drove away. A year later, the filmmakers discovered that he had driven to his brother's farm in Allegan, Michigan and was imprisoned there on drug-related charges. In order to finish the film, Palmer and Weisman got permission to film America while he was in jail and integrated the footage into the existing footage shot in 1967.

America's post Factory years are largely undocumented. At one point, he was reportedly in the United States Army for a brief period. During various points in the 1970s, he contacted his former lover Henry Geldzahler for money. By the early 1980s, Geldzahler said that America "was a wasted creature after they [Warhol's crowd] had finished with him. They finally washed their hands of him and let him float away. He's a poor burned-out thing living in a commune in Indiana and trying to pull himself together." According to writer Bob Colacello who worked for Warhol in the 1970s, America reappeared at Warhol's new studio at 33 Union Square West in the summer of 1974. Colacello recalls that Warhol became frightened due to America's disheveled appearance and "terrifying stare" and retreated to a back room. America said nothing and left without incident. America tried to contact Warhol via telephone for the last time in July 1982. As he was on a "Do Not Take Calls From" list, his call was not put through.

On October 19, 1982, Paul America was struck by a motorist and killed while walking home from a dental appointment in Ormond Beach, Florida.
