= Freedom of Speech: Lessons from Lenny Bruce =

2016 play by Amanda Faye Martin and Sam Weisman

Freedom of Speech: Lessons from Lenny Bruce is a 2016 American theatrical play written by Amanda Faye Martin and devised and directed by Sam Weisman in collaboration with the cast. The play explores the tension between comedy, censorship, and inclusivity in a politically charged era, as six college students confront the evolving boundaries of free speech inside a comedy club. It was inspired by the work of Lenny Bruce and the opening of the Lenny Bruce collection at the Robert D. Farber Archives at Brandeis University.

== Development and Lenny Bruce ==
The play was developed using personal photographs, writings, and recordings drawn from the Lenny Bruce collection at Brandeis University, which was donated by Bruce’s daughter, Kitty Bruce, in 2014. The collection and related events were supported by the Hugh M. Hefner Foundation, the Louis D. Brandeis Legacy Fund, and the ACLU Foundation of Massachusetts.

== Productions ==
Freedom of Speech: Lessons from Lenny Bruce premiered at Brandeis University on October 26, 2016. It was subsequently performed at multiple venues across the Greater Boston area, including:

- Cambridge Multicultural Arts Center, Cambridge, Massachusetts
- Arsenal Center for the Arts, Watertown, Massachusetts
- Gloucester Stage Company, Gloucester, Massachusetts
- The Rockwell, Davis Square, Somerville, Massachusetts
- The Hershel, Watertown, Massachusetts

== Original cast ==
The original cast featured Savannah Edmonds, Kate Farrell, Jacob Kleinberg, Yair Koas, Laura Marasa, Donald Phi Phi, and Gabi Nail as the six student characters. Comedian Corey Rodrigues portrayed the comedy club owner.
