= Gino Piserchio =

American musician, composer, and actor

- Born: Eugene Piserchio; September 5, 1944; Orange, New Jersey, U.S.
- Died: March 22, 1989 (aged 44); New York City, U.S.
- Education: Mannes College The New School for Music; Columbia University
- Occupations: Actor; composer; musician
- Spouse: Gillian Spreckels Fuller (m. 1972; div. 1975)

Eugene "Gino" Piserchio (September 5, 1944 – March 22, 1989) was an American actor, composer and musician. Piserchio was noted for being an accomplished musician. He was one of the first musicians to master the Moog synthesizer.

== Early life and career ==
Piserchio was born in Orange, New Jersey, to Joe and Jennie Piserchio. In the early 1950s, the Piserchio family moved from their Central Avenue home in Orange to Northfield Avenue in Livingston, New Jersey. It was there that Piserchio completed his grammar and high school educations. He graduated from Livingston High School in 1962. Piserchio graduated from the Mannes College The New School for Music in New York City and did graduate work at Columbia University.

In 1965, Piserchio co-starred with Warhol Superstar Edie Sedgwick in the underground films Space and Beauty No. 2, directed by Andy Warhol. Two years later, he composed and performed the original music for what would become Sedgwick's final film Ciao! Manhattan, released a year after her November 1971 death.

In 1970 Piserchio presented three evenings of electronic music on the Moog synthesizer at the Solomon R. Guggenheim Museum in New York City. In 1971, he and his future wife, Gillian Spreckels Fuller, produced an experimental 16-mm color movie, The Tacky Woman. The film stars Holly Woodlawn. That same year, Bell Labs selected Piserchio to score a movie about molecular dynamics.

== Personal life ==
On February 7, 1972, Piserchio married Gillian Spreckels Fuller at the Paragon Restaurant at Aspen, Colorado. Fuller is the great-granddaughter of John D. Spreckels, the California industrialist and financier who amassed a sugar fortune. The marriage ended in divorce three years later.

== Death ==
Piserchio died at age 44 of AIDS-related complications on March 22, 1989, in New York City.

== Filmography ==
Year	Title	Role	Notes
1965	Space		
1965	Beauty No. 2		
1968	A Lovely Way to Die	Michel	Alternative title: A Lovely Away to Go
1972	Ciao! Manhattan	–	Composer
