= Poor Little Rich Girl (1965 film) =

- Directed by: Andy Warhol
- Written by: Ronald Tavel
- Starring: Edie Sedgwick; Chuck Wein
- Release date: March 1965
- Country: United States
- Language: English

Poor Little Rich Girl is a 1965 underground film by Andy Warhol starring Edie Sedgwick. Poor Little Rich Girl was conceived as the first film in part of a series featuring Sedgwick called The Poor Little Rich Girl Saga. The saga was to include other Warhol films: Restaurant, Face, and Afternoon.

The title references the 1936 film of the same name, starring Shirley Temple, whom Warhol idolized as a child. The title also serves as a sort of description of the star, heiress Edie Sedgwick.

== Synopsis ==
The concept of Poor Little Rich Girl is a day in the life of socialite Edie Sedgwick. Warhol and Gerard Malanga began shooting in March 1965 in Sedgwick's posh New York City apartment. After initial filming and processing, the reels were found to be out of focus due to a faulty camera lens. Warhol then reshot footage, adding it to the original, out-of-focus first reel footage. The first reel depicts an out-of-focus Sedgwick waking up, ordering coffee and orange juice, smoking cigarettes and marijuana, exercising, taking pills and putting on makeup in silence. The only noise is that of an Everly Brothers record playing continuously in the background.

The second reel, which is in focus, shows Sedgwick lying on her bed and talking to her friend, Chuck Wein, who remains off-camera. Wein can be heard responding to Edie, asking various questions and commenting on different subjects, but never appears on camera. The rest of the film continues with Edie waking up Wein, the two discussing dreams (Wein alludes to his containing miles of people dressed like The Kingston Trio repeatedly playing "What Have They Done to the Rain"), Sedgwick talking on the telephone, during which Wein plays an album by The Shirelles, Sedgwick smoking an indistinguishable substance from a pipe, repeatedly applying lipstick, trying on different outfits, including a real leopard-skin coat (Wein describes the coat as "ugly," with buttons that look like "two-way radios"), casual conversation between the two including social situations and various friends, and vaguely describing how she spent her entire inheritance in six months.

== Premiere ==
In June 1965, Poor Little Rich Girl premiered at the Film-makers' Cooperative Cinematheque on a double bill with another Warhol film, Vinyl.

== See also ==
- Andy Warhol filmography
