= Ciao! Manhattan =

1972 film by David Weisman

- Movie poster
- Directed by: Chuck Wein; John Palmer; David Weisman
- Written by: Chuck Wein; Genevieve Charbin; John Palmer; David Weisman
- Produced by: Robert Margouleff; David Weisman
- Starring: Edie Sedgwick; Paul America; Wesley Hayes; Isabel Jewell; Baby Jane Holzer; Pat Hartley; Jean Margouleff; Viva; Brigid Berlin; Roger Vadim
- Cinematography: John Palmer; Kjell Rostad
- Edited by: Robert Farren
- Music by: Gino Piserchio
- Distributed by: Maron Films (1973); Plexifilm (2002)
- Release date: July 1972
- Running time: 90 minutes
- Country: United States
- Language: English

Ciao! Manhattan is a 1972 American avant-garde film starring Edie Sedgwick. The film blends scripted narrative with documentary footage to depict the rise and fall of a troubled socialite and former celebrity known as Susan Superstar.

Ciao! Manhattan was assembled from footage shot over several years. The first project, a black-and-white film in 1967 by underground filmmaker Chuck Wein, was launched with great fanfare as Sedgwick was emerging from the height of her fame as a Warhol superstar. Production was repeatedly delayed by Sedgwick's declining mental health and Paul America's legal issues. In 1970, filmmakers John Palmer and David Weisman revived the project in California, restructuring it around cinéma vérité-style audio recordings and newly filmed scenes. Completed shortly after Sedgwick's death in 1971, the film was released in 1972 and has since been regarded as a cult classic and a poignant record of Sedgwick's life and New York's 1960s underground scene.

== Overview ==
Ciao! Manhattan is the semi-biographical tale of 1960s counterculture icon Edie Sedgwick. The film follows young Susan Superstar (Sedgwick) through her tumultuous party years in Manhattan as one of Andy Warhol's Superstars. Through actual audio recordings of Sedgwick's account of her time in Warhol's Factory in New York City, Ciao! captures the complete deterioration of Sedgwick's fictional alter-ego. The striking similarities between Sedgwick and Susan's life story, especially when recounted by Sedgwick in the midst of drug-induced audio interviews, make the film's candid depiction of excess and celebrity especially haunting. The film is dedicated to the memory of Sedgwick and ends with the headlines announcing Sedgwick's (not Susan Superstar's) death, thus inseparably associating the fictional and the genuine figure.

== Production ==
The development of Ciao! Manhattan began when filmmaker John Palmer, producer Robert Margouleff, and writer Chuck Wein conceived the project as a low-budget feature. Although the production emerged from New York's underground scene, the filmmakers sought a more professional approach than was typical of contemporary experimental films. In 1967, Wein rejected the notion that the film was an underground production. "The Underground film is made without a script or a budget, the actors aren't paid and there is a minimum of technique," said Wein. By contrast, his film was produced from a script, reportedly had an $85,000 budget, and employed paid actors.

According to director David Weisman, Warhol superstar Susan Bottomly (International Velvet), who appeared in Chelsea Girls (1966), was originally cast as the lead character Susan. However, because she was only 17 years old and her father refused to sign the required release forms, she was forced to withdraw from the project.

The filmmakers then turned to Edie Sedgwick at the suggestion of Wein despite concerns about her declining health and increasing drug use. Sedgwick was subsequently cast in the lead role, and principal photography began on April 21, 1967, in Central Park. The film, which was initially directed by Wein, featured several figures associated with Andy Warhol's Factory, including Sedgwick, Paul America in the male lead, and fellow Warhol superstars Baby Jane Holzer and Viva in supporting roles.

Wein and Genevieve Charbin co-wrote the screenplay, which early reports describe as a "modern comedy," and "'an absurd concoction' involving, among other elements, the Mafia, a teeny-bopper seeking to end an unwanted pregnancy, and Allen Ginsberg, the poet, who, in the stills from the picture, appears totally nude." The production was plagued by budget problems and an unfinished screenplay. Frequent absences by cast members, including Sedgwick and America, together with widespread drug use among participants, repeatedly hindered filming.

In August 1967, Ciao! Manhattan was reported to be in the editing stages and had been acquired by Peppercorn-Wormser Film Enterprises for a planned release later that year. However, production stalled, and by October 1968, filming had been halted as America awaited trial on narcotics charges in Michigan, and Sedgwick was undergoing treatment at a New York state psychiatric hospital. By that point, approximately 110,000 feet of 35 mm color film had been shot, with less than 10,000 feet remaining. The filmmakers subsequently revised the script to incorporate these developments, planning to film scenes at the Allegan County Jail and the hospital where Sedgwick was a patient. Weisman described the changes as "a case of events shaping the script instead of the script dictating the events."

As costs mounted and progress stalled, the project's financiers—Margouleff's parents—lost confidence in the film. Faced with an incomplete and largely unusable production, Palmer and Weisman reworked the screenplay in 1970, using existing footage as flashbacks to frame Sedgwick's story through the fictional character Susan Superstar. The film evolved into a semi-autobiographical portrait of Sedgwick's rise and decline within New York's countercultural and celebrity circles. Production resumed in California in the fall of 1970, where Sedgwick filmed new scenes reflecting on her past while struggling with chronic substance abuse. The film ended up costing over $350,000 to make and entered post-production in 1971. Later that year, Sedgwick died from acute barbiturate intoxication.

== Release ==
The film had its premiere in Amsterdam in July 1972 to critical acclaim, due in part to Sedgwick's onscreen presence and representation of a culture that she helped to define. The successful screenings continued in London, Germany, France, San Diego, Denver, and Tempe, Arizona, but then the film disappeared for nearly a decade until interest in Edie Sedgwick was sparked again by the best-selling book Edie: An American Biography by George Plimpton and Jean Stein in 1982.

== DVD release on 30th anniversary ==
In the years since its original release, Ciao! Manhattan has become a cult classic, due in large part to the film being Edie Sedgwick's last starring vehicle. On July 19, 2002, exactly 30 years after its world premiere in Amsterdam, Ciao! opened at New York's Cinema Village. In October 2002, Plexifilm released a special edition DVD with additional 35mm outtake footage, rare pictures and interviews with the cast and crew of the film.

== Soundtrack ==
On April 22, 2017, Light in the Attic Records released the film's official soundtrack on their Cinewax imprint, for the occasion of Record Store Day. The first vinyl pressing was limited to 3,000 copies, and it contains the prominent songs featured in the film (by Richie Havens, John Phillips, Kim Milford, and the duo of Skip Battin and Kim Fowley), in addition to most of the incidental electronic music performed by Gino Piserchio. Before this release, the film's soundtrack never had been released in any form. A CD version of the soundtrack is also available.

== See also ==
- List of American films of 1972
