= Inside (1996 film) =

- Genre: Crime; Drama
- Screenplay by: Bima Stagg
- Directed by: Arthur Penn
- Starring: Nigel Hawthorne; Eric Stoltz; Louis Gossett Jr.
- Theme music composer: Robert Levin
- Country of origin: United States
- Original language: English

Production
- Executive producers: Louis Gossett Jr. Dan Paulson
- Producers: Hillard Elkins; David Wicht
- Production location: Johannesburg, South Africa
- Cinematography: Jan Weincke
- Editor: Suzanne Pillsbury
- Running time: 94 minutes
- Production companies: Elkins Entertainment; Film Afrika Worldwide; Logo Entertainment; Showtime Networks
- Budget: $2,000,000

Original release
- Network: Showtime
- Release: August 25, 1996

Inside is a 1996 cable television film directed by Arthur Penn based on a script by Bima Stagg. It was the Penn's final film before dying in 2010. The film was shot in Johannesburg, South Africa and premiered in the United States on Showtime on 25 August 1996. The film was then released theatrically in several markets and played at several film festivals around the world including Cannes, Toronto, San Francisco and Munich. The film was nominated for an Emmy, and a Cable Ace Award.

== Plot ==
Colonel Kruger (Nigel Hawthorne) tortures a political prisoner (Eric Stoltz) to learn who his anti-apartheid collaborators are. Ten years later, this same Colonel himself becomes a prisoner and is interrogated about his own offenses.

== Cast ==
- Nigel Hawthorne as Colonel Hendrick Kruger
- Eric Stoltz as Peter Martin "Marty" Strydom
- Louis Gossett Jr. as Questioner
- Ian Roberts as Guard Moolman
- Janine Eser
- Jerry Mofokeng as Mzwaki
- Patrick Shai as Bhambo
- Ross Preller as Guard Potgieter
