= Alberte Pagán =

Galician writer and filmmaker

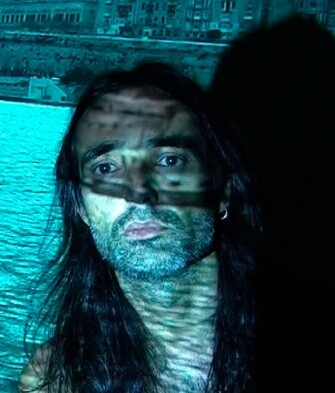
- Alberte Pagán in his film A Pedra do Lobo (2010)
- Born: 1965 (age 60–61); O Carballiño, Spain
- Occupations: writer and filmmaker
- Known for: Experimental film
- Notable work: Bs. As., Tanyaradzwa, Eclipse, Percorridos por unha teoría do desexo

Alberte Pagán, born in O Carballiño in 1965, is a Galician filmmaker and writer.

== Film criticism ==
Alberte Pagán is a recognized theorist and researcher. Writing in Galician, Spanish and English, he has published many articles, chapters and books on experimental cinema. His Introducción aos clásicos do cinema experimental was published in 1999 by the Centro Galego de Arte Contemporánea. He authored Imaxes do soño en liberdade. O cinema de Eugenio Granell, a monograph on the film work of surrealist painter Eugenio Granell. In 2014 he published Andy Warhol, a "complete and rigorous" monograph which vindicates the materiality of the artist's films. He has collected his in-depth interviews with Peter Kubelka, Malcolm Le Grice, Ken Jacobs, Taka Iimura, Phil Hoffman, and Bill Brand in Emotional Materials / Personal Processes. Six Interviews with Experimental Filmmakers.

== Political filmmaking ==
Alberte Pagán is a key figure among Galician filmmakers. His films have a strong political bent, but are also concerned with "signifier-signified explorations" and "seriality, metanarration, hybridization of materials and subversion of codes", as in Pó de estrelas (2007) or in the films from his series "Surfaces" and "Film Studies". His cinema combines "formal research with political implications".

The whole of his work can be read as a "manual of resistance", from agit-prop to the deconstruction of inherited codes. The political strand of Urgent Film for Palestine (2012) is rooted in the anticolonialism of films like Afrique 50 (René Vautier, 1950). Among his influences are Andy Warhol, Michael Snow and Chris Marker. His films "generate controversy" and "provoke analysis and reflection" "while still achieving attractive and genuine visual results".

He has filmed in Nicaragua (Os waslala, 2005), Western Sahara (Asahra hurratun!, 2009), Zimbabwe (Tanyaradzwa, 2009) and Colombia (A realidade, 2012), but has also reflected on the political problems of Galicia as in Faustino 1936 (2010) and A quem se lhe conte... (2011), which deals with the environmental disaster produced on the Galician coast by the oil spill from the Prestige tanker. The inverted chromatism and the "depressed landscapes" of A quem se lhe conte... remind us of the aesthetics of the paintings by Anselm Kiefer and Daniel Richter. His political films are "a lucid anthology of the chronic evils of today's world".

=== Bs. As. ===
His first film to receive recognition was the minimalist and conceptual Bs. As. (2006), awarded at the Play-Doc Film Festival and winner of the Román Gubern Film-Essay Award. Bs. As., modelled after Chantal Akerman's News from Home, is "a forceful and, at times, enigmatic work", a collage of past and present, of Europe and America, of documentary and experimentalism, in which Pagán recovers the oral history of his family, broken apart by emigration. The film intertwines family progression with political history. Its final 14-minute-long tracking shot in Buenos Aires metro has been interpreted as a "descent into the hell [...] of identity".

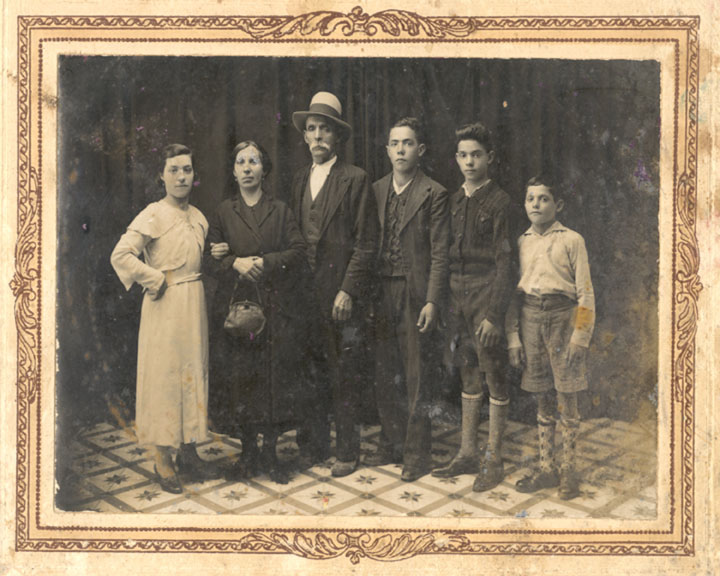
Bs. As.

Bs. As. is the forerunner of the New Galician Cinema (NGC). Its dual composition, which would be retaken in other NGC films like Tanyaradzwa, Todos vós sodes capitáns (Oliver Laxe, 2010) and Costa da Morte (Lois Patiño, 2013), also helped shape Xurxo Chirro's Vikingland (2011). The film turned Pagán into a reference, a "touchstone" and a pioneer of the NGC. As Martínez writes, "without any doubt, Alberte Pagán embodies the figure of the patriarch of this group of creators."

=== A Pedra do Lobo ===
A Pedra do Lobo (2010) was Pagán's first foray into fiction filmmaking. Filmed in Galicia, Panama and Malta, it is "a raw, visceral and rough film". It is a "spacial" remake of the "temporal" Hour of the Wolf (Vargtimmen, Bergman, 1968). The filmmaker constructed the film from eighteen hours of improvised filmed material. It is a montage film, in the sense that it was not filmed to illustrate a story, but was improvised, so that the autonomous scenes, when spliced together, trigger the narration. It was the first film by Pagán to receive financing (€10,735.33 net, €18,000 gross) from the Galician Agency of Cultural Industries.

=== Tanyaradzwa ===
His three-hour-long, double screen Tanyaradwa, filmed in Zimbabwe, was defined as "anti-anthropological" and "antiethnographic", so as to avoid any temptation of an orientalist reading. It is divided in two parts: "Scenes of country life" and "Scenes of city life". Tanyaradzwa, influenced by Andy Warhol's cinema, opts for "disintermediation" and direct communication with the audience, outside of commercial modes of production and established distribution circuits. Its double screen, which removes narrative causality, is also a materialist device that serves to defuse emotion, as in the sequence where, on one screen, the actor and co-author Tanyaradzwa recounts parental abuse, whereas on the other she laughs and talks inconsequentially while smoking weed. In the film, the protagonist is not the object of the camera, but rather a subject in possession of a discourse that challenges our ethnographic gaze.

The filmmaker made a four-screen version for Play-Doc Film Festival (where it won the Best Galician Film award), "redoubling its commitment to experimentation in the field of random editing".

=== Other films ===
Pó de estrelas, hailed as one of the best short films of the year by Cahiers du Cinéma España, is film of "montage as organizer of discourse and of cinema as a militant and critical tool, but never as a pamphlet".

His short Eclipse (2010) was one "of the most emblematic films of the NGC". In Eclipse Pagán does not use the video camera in a realist way, but rather plays with it "as something much richer in nuances, capable of playing with the textures and effects derived from the incidence of light on the analog mechanism of the camera".

Puilha (2010-2020) is a double-screen film which combines and compares two recording of a ruined house seemingly empty. On the left we see the images recorded on January 17 at 3:33pm, on the right the images recorded exactly to the minute ten years later. The decay and apparent abandonment of its façade contrasts with the smoke coming out of the chimney, which reveals life inside the ruins.

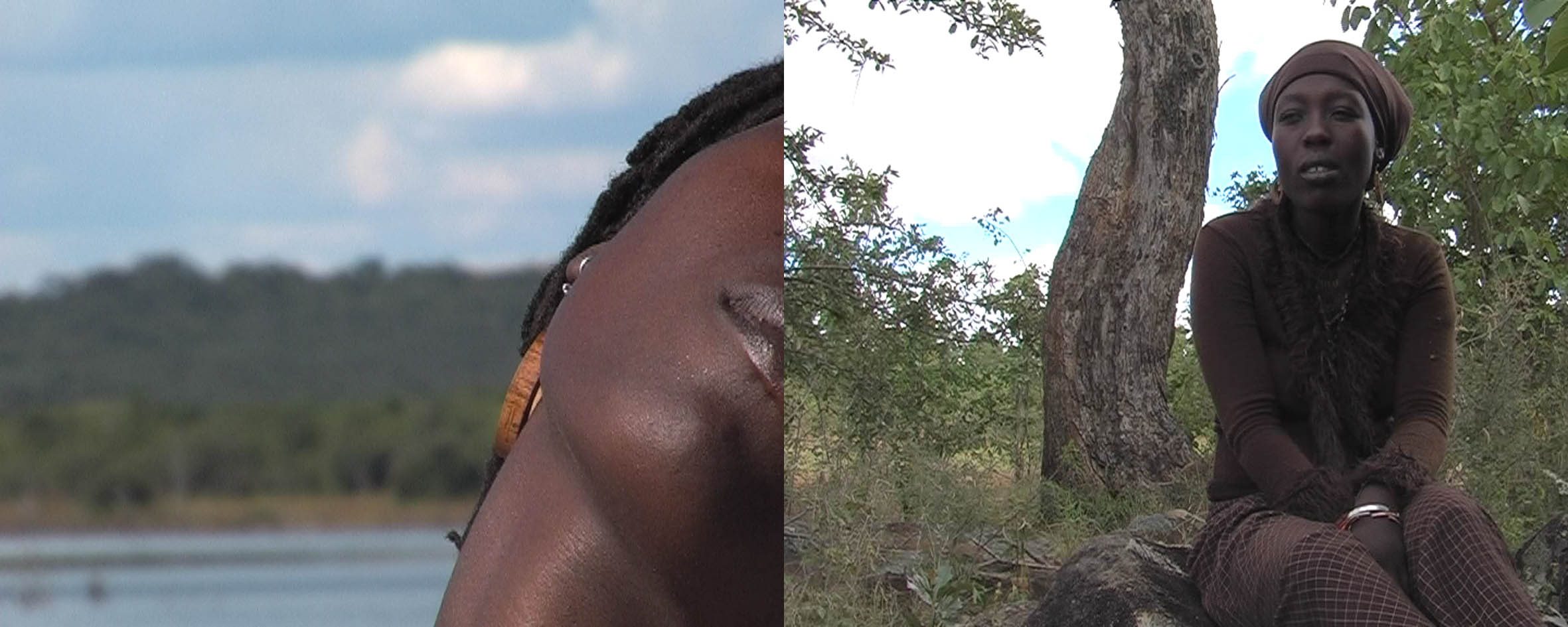
Tanyaradzwa

Uluru, winner of the Galiza Award in the Curtocircuito International Film Festival, connects with the cosmopolitan vocation of the New Galician Cinema, but can also be read as a vindication of the right to self-determination of both the Australian aboriginal peoples and those of Galicia.

His award-winning Elefante is the shortest film possible. It consists of a single frame which lasts 1/60th of a second (16.7 milliseconds). "Elephant proves the essential difference between photography and cinema, the radical difference between a frame and a photograph – cinema is not movement (a single frame cannot reproduce movement) but visual time. Elephant imposes its (minute) duration, which simultaneously shows and hides." The film is a denunciation of everyday fascism.

=== Film Studies ===
Walsed (2014), an interpretation of Eugene Deslaw's Visión fantástica (1957), inaugurated the series "film studies", in which Pagán uses found footage to deconstruct the original films and subvert their meanings. But the found footage Pagán reuses in Walsed, as in Quim.com (2014) and Frank (2015), is already constructed from previous found footage, hence we can call these films "third generation" pieces. Both Walsed and Frank are "a reflection on the vampiric power of images".

Also a found footage film, but made outside the "film studies" series, is A mosca (2017), a brief film made by cutting up every single frame of an anonymous trailer and randomly reordering them. Part of the ongoing Proxecto Remolque (Project Trailer) conceived by Cris Lores, A mosca proves "the impossibility of replicating what has disintegrated".

=== Surfaces ===
In his series "Surfaces", started in 2014, Pagán investigates the behaviour of images once they are projected onto "unusual" surfaces, which achieve a "tactile feeling". His film Forgoselo creates a petrified sky through the projection of the image of a rock onto the same kind of rock; but it nevertheless has a "sociopolitical and cultural subtext", as ganite is traditionally used in Galician stonemasonry. Pagán consists of a single overhead shot, filmed in Pagan, projected onto a flat plate of slate. Gongoriin bombani hural constains two shots filmed in Mongolia, one urban, the other rural, projected onto wood. Its "conceptual and formal complexity" alludes to "the memory of space". In Berbera, filmed in the Somali city of the same name, the projection surface (the leaves of a camphor tree) stands out against the projected image; the contrast between the two images causes a "strangeness in our gaze" that, all the same, "balances beauty and tension".

Long Face and Sonho bolivariano, which inaugurated the series "surfaces", are projected onto a carbon portrait and onto a layer of mold, respectively, to highlight "the physicality of the image". Nyaungshwe projects the image of a woman onto her own naked body; its pictorial nature and its "close and inaccurate sensuality" are reminiscent of the paintings of Francis Bacon and Lucien Freud.

=== Glitches ===
In his diptych "Glitches" Pagán tries to find the materiality of the digital image. The manipulations in the hexadecimal code of the video files caused glitches which the filmmaker had to fix by capturing the computer screen, as every video would stumble at differente moments on different glitches. As a result, "the photographic image serves as a documentary base to then be dismantled into painting" and "triggers different sensations through texture, color, concealment and unconcealment of form".

A Fundamental Error is a retake on his Peter, a portrait of Peter Kubelka which is part of the "Surfaces" series. Noite de rodos is reminiscent of the abstract paintings of Gerhard Richter.

== Literary Works ==
Alberte Pagán has translated the first two chapters of James Joyce's Finnegans Wake and the first and last sections of Andy Warhol's novel a into Galician. Contrary to what is usually thought, Pagán has argued that "to say that [Finnegans Wake] is untranslatable is to say that it is illegible", and as it is legible, it follows that it can be translated. His chosen translation for the title of Joyce's novel is Velório de Finnegans, suggesting "a funeral wake for plural Finnegans". His "meticulously annotated" translation appeared in 1993 and "still remains the most substantial Galician rendering of any part of FW." It was the first complete translation of the first two chapters in any of the languages of the Iberian Peninsula".

He self-published the poetry book Prosopagnosia (2013), a combination of "poetic avant-garde and political manifesto", and the novels Percorridos por unha teoría do desexo (2015) and Jalundes (2022). Poem no. 37 from Prosopagnosia, "Vim mais do que esperava", was dramatized by AveLina Pérez in her theatrical production of Campo de covardes in 2016.

Percorridos was heralded by critic literary Isaac Lourido as one of the ten best Galician books of the previous decade. It combines essay with fiction and short story with novel. Each chapter can be read as an independent story or as part of the global development of the main character.

== Works ==
=== Filmography ===
- Os Waslala (2005)
- Bs. As. (2006)
- Pó de estrelas (2007)
- A soluçom é o socialismo (2008)
- Tanyaradzwa (2009)
- Asahra hurratun! (2009)
- Puílha 17 janeiro 2010 15:33h (2010)
- Eclipse (2010)
- A Pedra do Lobo (2010)
- Faustino 1936 (2010)
- Outrasvozes (2011)
- A quem se lhe conte... (2011)
- Película urgente por Palestina (2012)
- A realidade (2012)
- Walsed (2014)
- Superfícies – Forgoselo (granito) (2014)
- Quim.com (2014)
- Frank (2015)
- Superfícies – Peter (tubo) (2015)
- Konfrontationen 2014 (2015)
- A Fundamental Error (2016)
- τεμενος^{3} (2017)
- Flora e fauna (shot on sight) (2017)
- A mosca (2017)
- Uluru (2018)
- O caruncho (2018)
- τέχνη (2019)
- 6x9 (2019)
- Oplezir (2020)
- Dolores (2021)
- Elefante (2022)
- Bronwyn (2023)
- Tristes tropiques (2023)

=== Literary works ===
- Película urgente por Palestina (Obra dramática num acto) (play; 2012) (in Galician)
- Prosopagnosia (poems; 2013) (in Galician)
- Como foi o conto e outras peças teatrais (collection of plays; 2013) (in Galician)
- The Book of Bs. As. (script and essays on the film; 2015) (in Galician, Spanish, English and Asturian)
- Percorridos por unha teoria do desexo (novel; 2015) (in Galician)
- Jalundes (novel; 2022) (in Galician)
- "Feitos probados" (short story; 2024), en Historias de Barbantia. 17 relatos de autoras e autores do Barbanza, Vigo: Galaxia, pp. 23–32. (in Galician) ISBN 978-84-1176-206-9

=== Non-fiction ===
- Introdución aos clásicos do cinema experimental (Centro Galego de Arte Contemporánea, 1999). (in Galician and Spanish) ISBN 978-84-453-2339-7
- A voz do trevón. Unha aproximación a Finnegans Wake (Laiovento, 2000). (in Galician) ISBN 978-84-89896-66-6
- Imaxes do soño en liberdade: o cinema de Eugenio Granell (Xunta de Galicia, 2003). (in Galician) ISBN 978-84-453-3478-2
- "Imágenes del sueño en libertad: Pulsaciones poéticas en el cine de Eugenio Granell". Litoral. La poesía del cine (Diputación Provincial de Málaga, 2003). (in Spanish) ISBN 0212-4378-23 5
- "Cinema Underground estadounidense", in Cueto, Roberto and Weinrichter, Antonio (2004). Dentro y fuera de Hollywood. La tradición independiente en el cine americano. Festival Internacional de Cine de Gijón. (in Spanish) ISBN 978-84-482-3896-4
- "Residuos experimentales en Arrebato", in Cueto, Roberto (2006). Arrebato... 25 años. Filmoteca de Valencia. (in Spanish) ISBN 978-84-482-4308-1
- "O ballets mecánicos de Eugenio Granell, cineasta experimental". Congreso Interdisciplinar Eugenio Ganell. Actas (Fundación Eugenio Granell, 2007). (in Galician, Spanish and English) ISBN 978-84-89440-45-6
- A mirada impasíbel (Edicións Positivas, 2007). (in Galician) ISBN 978-84-87783-89-0
- "Eu vou ser como a toupeira ou Para que serve o cinema?", in Non conciliados. Argumentos para a resistencia cultural (Cineclube de Compostela, 2010). (in Galician) ISBN 978-84-614-0937-2
- A mirada inqueda (Edicións Positivas, 2013). (in Galician) ISBN 978-84-939812-9-7
- "Arqueologías cinematográficas", in Eugenio Granell e o cine. Unha película de vinte minutos (Xunta de Galicia, 2013). (in Galician and English) ISBN 978-84-453-5074-4
- Andy Warhol (Cátedra, 2014). (in Spanish) ISBN 978-84-376-3227-8
- "Formas del cine-poema (Los caminos de la poesía en el cine)", in Oter, Jorge and Zunzunegui, Santos. Ensayos de poética. Miradas sobre el contacto entre el cine y la poesía (2019). Universidad del País Vasco. (in Spanish) ISBN 978-84-9082-833-5
- "Os caminhos da Severa / The paths of Severa", in Romero, Pedro G. (ed.). Os novos Babilónios. Atravessar a fronteira, Galeria Municipal do Porto (2022), chapter 5, pp. 13–15. (in Portuguese and English) ISBN 978-989-53480-7-7
- Emotional Materials / Personal Processes. Six Interviews with Experimental Filmmakers (Stereo Editions, 2022).
- "Documentos de un tiempo robado. Entrevista con Paulino Viota", en Viota, Paulino. La familia del cine, Sevilla: Athenaica Ediciones (2024), pp. 367–411. (in Spanish) ISBN 978-84-19874-51-1

=== Sound art ===
Pagán's sound sculptures were used in AveLina Pérez's play Os cans non comprenden a Kandinsky.

- A música da morte (sound sculptures, 1996-2010)
- A Pedra do Lobo [OST] (Urro/Amaro Ferreiroa, 2013)
- Frank (2016)

== Awards and recognitions ==
- 2007: Bs. As.: Best Galician Film at Play-Doc film Festival
- 2007: Bs. As.: Winner of the Román Gubern Film-Essay Award
- 2010: Tanyaradzwa: Best Galician Film at the Play-Doc Film Festival
- 2010: A Pedra do Lobo: Recipient of a subsidy for film creation by Xunta de Galicia
- 2011: A quem se lhe conte...: Recipient of a subsidy for film creation by Xunta de Galicia
- 2016: A Fundamental Error: CAMIRA Jury Special Mention at Curtocircuito Film Festival
- 2016: Galician Critics Award (career award)
- 2018: Uluru: Best Galician Film at Curtocircuito Film Festival
- 2021: Honorific Mention (Festival Primavera do Cine) (career award)
- 2021: Cineuropa Award (career award)
- 2022: Elefante: Special Mention at Curtocircuito Film Festival
- 2022: Elefante: Jury Award at Intersección Film Festival
- 2022: Elefante: A COLECTIVA Award at Intersección Film Festival
