= Joe Campbell (actor) =

American actor

Joe Campbell (November 4, 1936 – October 2, 2005) was an American actor who appeared in the 1965 film My Hustler. In the film Campbell's role was called "Sugar Plum Fairy". Campbell was mentioned as "the Sugar Plum Fairy" in the 1972 Lou Reed song "Walk on the Wild Side". Campbell was given that nickname by Dorothy Dean. Campbell was in a relationship with Harvey Milk from 1955 to 1962. He died on October 2, 2005.

Following his relationship with Milk, Campbell met former U.S. Marine Oliver Sipple at a Greenwich Village bar. Sipple, who would later gain national attention for intervening in a 1975 assassination attempt on U.S. President Gerald Ford, fell in love with Campbell. The couple moved to Fort Lauderdale, Florida, together in the 1960s, while maintaining a supportive correspondence with Milk.
