= Dick Fontaine =

English documentary filmmaker (1939–2023)

- Born: 1939; London, England
- Died: 10 October 2023 (aged 83–84)
- Education: Cambridge University
- Occupation: Documentary filmmaker
- Spouse: Pat Hartley
- Children: Daniel Fontaine, Smokey Fontaine

Dick Fontaine (1939 – 28 October 2023) was an English documentary filmmaker. He was Head of Documentary Department at the National Film and Television School from 1995 to 2012 (UK).

== Biography ==
Born in Hampstead, London, England, in 1939, Fontaine graduated with an MA degree in Moral Sciences from Cambridge University, and in 1962 he joined Granada Television as a researcher, going on to become one of the founders of Granada's World in Action series. Fontaine became one of the first filmmakers to make films about the Beatles; having seen the band perform in Stockport he scouted the Cavern Club on 1 August 1962, and filmed the band at the Cavern at their 22 August lunchtime show – Ringo Starr's fourth show as a member of the band – for the Know the North programme. It would have been the band's first TV appearance. The footage was deemed too grainy, but as the band became more successful, so did the historic value of the film, eventually being aired on Granada's Scene at 6.30 in November 1963, and being a much repeated clip ever since. In February 1964, he made a longer film for Granada, covering their first tour of the United States; one of his cameramen for this film was Albert Maysles, who then took the footage and reused it for a US television broadcast What's Happening! The Beatles in the U.S.A. without crediting Fontaine's direction or Granada's production.

Fontaine amassed a significant body of films on contemporary jazz, including on Ornette Coleman (1966), Sonny Rollins (1968), Betty Carter and Art Blakey (1986/1987). He made numerous films on African-American music and other closely related topics, such as Beat This: A Hip-Hop History (1984) and Bombin' (1988). In all, he made more than 40 documentaries.

Among the wide range of subjects he profiled in film are figures such as James Baldwin, Norman Mailer and Jean Shrimpton, Black Panther George Jackson, as well as many musicians: Kathleen Battle, John Cage, Johnny Rotten, and others. In 1969, Fontaine along with Nic Knowland, Chris Menges and others, co-founded the radical film co-operative Tattooist International to support the production of independent newsreels, music films and underground features, including Fontaine's Double Pisces, Scorpio Rising (1970) and Yoko Ono's film Rape (1969).

Together with his wife, the African-American actress Pat Hartley (who appeared in several Andy Warhol films, as well as Rainbow Bridge and Absolute Beginners), Fontaine co-founded Grapevine Productions in order to produce their work, including feature-length documentaries I Heard it Through the Grapevine (1982), in which writer James Baldwin revisits the deep south to reexamine the scenes of civil rights strife in the 1960s, and Art Blakey: The Jazz Messenger (1989). Fontaine is the father, with Pat Hartley, of writer, music critic and editor Smokey Fontaine.

In 1993, Fontaine started a film production course at New York's School of Visual Arts, and from 1996 to 2012 he ran the Documentary Department at the postgraduate National Film and Television School (NFTS), where graduates he worked with included Nick Broomfield, Kim Longinotto, as well as a younger generation of documentarists such as Simon Chambers, Sandhya Suri, Daniel Vernon, Sam Blair and George Amponsah.

Fontaine's documentary film Sonny Rollins: Beyond the Notes premiered on the BBC Four television series Arena in February 2012.

Fontaine died on 28 October 2023.

== Selected films ==
- The Face On the Cover (1964)
- Yeah! Yeah! Yeah! AKA Yeah, Yeah, Yeah, New York Meets the Beatles (1964)
- Madam Six (1965)
- Temporary Person Passing Through (1965)
- Don't Mrs Worthington (1966)
- Tati in the Traffic (1966)
- Who's Crazy? AKA David, Moffett & Ornette (1966)
- Sound??? (1966)
- Heroes (1967)
- Will the Real Norman Mailer Please Stand Up! (1967)
- Who Is Sonny Rollins? (1968)
- Who Is Victor Vasarely? (1968)
- The Other Guys Are the Joke (1970)
- Double Pisces Scorpio Rising (1971)
- Death of a Revolutionary (1972)
- Who Killed Cock Robin? (1974)
- A Famous Soldier (1976)
- I Heard it Through the Grapevine (1982)
- Beat This! A Hip Hop-History (1984)
- Bombin' (1986)
- Art Blakey: The Jazz Messenger (1987)
- Cleo Sings Sondheim (1988)
- New York Law (1989)
- Betty Carter: New All the Time (1994)
- Sonny Rollins – Beyond The Notes (2012)
