= Factory Girl (2006 film) =

2006 film by George Hickenlooper

- Directed by: George Hickenlooper
- Screenplay by: Captain Mauzner
- Story by: Captain Mauzner; Aaron Richard Golub
- Produced by: Aaron Richard Golub; Holly Wiersma
- Starring: Sienna Miller; Guy Pearce; Hayden Christensen; Jimmy Fallon; Mena Suvari; Shawn Hatosy
- Cinematography: Michael Grady
- Edited by: Dana E. Glauberman
- Music by: Edward Shearmur
- Production companies: The Weinstein Company; Myriad Pictures; Lift Productions
- Distributed by: Metro-Goldwyn-Mayer (through MGM Distribution Co.)
- Release date: December 29, 2006
- Running time: 99 minutes
- Country: United States
- Budget: $7 million
- Box office: $3.6 million

Factory Girl is a 2006 American biographical film directed by George Hickenlooper. It is based on the rapid rise and fall of 1960s underground film star and socialite Edie Sedgwick (Sienna Miller), known for her association with the artist Andy Warhol (Guy Pearce).

Factory Girl was released by Metro-Goldwyn-Mayer (through MGM Distribution Co.) on December 29, 2006, to largely negative reviews from critics, who nonetheless praised Miller's performance as Sedgwick. The film grossed $3.6 million against a $7 million budget.

== Plot ==
The film is framed by Edie Sedgwick being interviewed in a hospital several years after her time as an Andy Warhol superstar.

In the mid 1960s, Edie is a young heiress studying art in Cambridge, Massachusetts. She moves to New York City with her friend, Chuck Wein. She is introduced to pop art painter and film-maker Andy Warhol, who is intrigued by the beautiful, clearly troubled socialite. He asks her to perform in one of his underground experimental films. She agrees and goes on to star in several of Andy's projects, becoming his muse.

She and Chuck become part of the tightly knit bohemian social scene at Andy's art studio, the Silver Factory. Edie's status as a Warhol superstar and rising youthquake fashion model earn her fame and international attention. The success fails to ease her psychological issues. Although descended from a prestigious family lineage and raised on an idyllic California ranch, Edie was sexually abused by her father during childhood. She has been further shaken by the fairly recent death of her favorite brother, Minty. Her trauma manifests itself in uncontrolled spending, poor money management and a burgeoning drug habit.

Edie's Cambridge friend, Syd visits her in New York City and introduces her to folk singer Billy Quinn, a character based on Bob Dylan. Edie and Billy begin a relationship, which causes Andy to become jealous. Edie attempts to make peace between the two men by arranging a screen test for Billy at Andy's Factory. When Billy and his posse arrive, they act disrespectfully towards Andy. Billy and Edie fight and he tells her that Andy is a "bloodsucker" who will "kill" her. She tearfully responds that she "can't hate him." Realizing that she has chosen Andy over him, Billy leaves her.

Edie's worsening drug addiction begins taking its toll. Her relationship with Andy deteriorates and she becomes a pariah among the Factory crowd. One night, while in a drug-induced stupor, she falls asleep with a lit cigarette and nearly dies in the ensuing apartment fire. Vogue, which once championed her as the newest "it" girl, now refuses to hire her; editor Diana Vreeland explains that Edie is considered "vulgar" due to her current lifestyle.

When Syd visits Edie again, she is barely conscious and is being filmed naked by three strangers in her apartment. Syd kicks the men out and looks after Edie. He gets them a taxi and shows her a photo of herself back in Cambridge. He says she inspired him back then and she can be an artist once more. Edie, deeply upset at how far she's fallen, gets out of their cab and runs frantically down the street.

The scene transitions to the film's opening framing device of the hospital interview several years later. Edie tells the interviewer that to "stay off the drugs" is going to be a battle every day, that she is pursuing art again and is glad to be home in Santa Barbara, California. The closing captions explain that in her last few years Edie continued in her struggle with dependency. Her short marriage to a fellow patient ended when she died of a barbiturate overdose at the age of 28.

Meanwhile, in New York City, Andy is interviewed the day after Edie died in 1971. When the interviewer asks about her and Andy's "breakup," Andy becomes visibly uncomfortable but manages to complete his thought that it was just so long ago and he hardly knew her at all.

== Cast ==
- Sienna Miller as Edie Sedgwick
- Guy Pearce as Andy Warhol
- Hayden Christensen as Billy Quinn, "the musician" (character based on Bob Dylan)
- Jimmy Fallon as Chuck Wein
- Jack Huston as Gerard Malanga
- Tara Summers as Brigid Polk
- Mena Suvari as Richie Berlin
- Shawn Hatosy as Syd Pepperman
- Beth Grant as Julia Warhola
- James Naughton as Fuzzy Sedgwick
- Edward Herrmann as James Townsend
- Mary-Kate Olsen as Molly Spence
- Illeana Douglas as Diana Vreeland
- Mary Elizabeth Winstead as Ingrid Superstar
- Don Novello as Mort Silvers
- Johnny Whitworth as Silver George
- Brian Bell as Lou Reed
- Patrick Wilson as John Cale
- Michael Stephens as Sterling Morrison
- Samantha Maloney as Maureen Tucker
- Meredith Ostrom as Nico
- Michael Post as Taxi Driver (Post was Sedgwick's husband)

== Controversy ==
Lou Reed, singer-songwriter of the Velvet Underground and one of the Factory people who knew Sedgwick, hated the film. He told the New York Daily News, "I read that script. It's one of the most disgusting, foul things I've seen – by any illiterate retard – in a long time. There's no limit to how low some people will go to write something to make money."

Bob Dylan threatened to sue, saying through his lawyers that the script insinuated his responsibility in Sedgwick's drug abuse and death. Although the name of the character in question was changed to Billy Quinn, Dylan still attempted to halt the film's release. Sienna Miller defended the film against Dylan's allegations, saying in an interview with the Guardian, "It blames Warhol more than anyone, because he did abandon her...there was a friendship there, she needed help and no one helped her. It's not that Dylan drove her to heroin addiction."

== Production ==
The film was set back by numerous delays, including a lawsuit by Sony Pictures, as well as the schedules of Miller and Pearce, so additional shooting was delayed until mid November 2006. Consequently, producer Harvey Weinstein had to postpone the release date. Additionally, according to director George Hickenlooper, the budget was once expected to be $8 million, but ended up being less than $7 million.

Hickenlooper helmed the additional shoots and mixed the final cut of the film in New York City, where he worked in close collaboration with Weinstein. Weinstein released the picture on December 29, 2006, in Los Angeles. Because the post production schedule was so delayed, Hickenlooper continued to sound edit the film after its initial release. The film received a nationwide release on February 2, 2007.

During the fall of 2008, Hickenlooper uploaded a rough director's cut of the film to YouTube now referred to as "The Unseen Director's Cut". Due to the Weinstein Company's ownership of the footage and the material not being authorized for release, it was removed from the website.

=== Casting ===
Katie Holmes was set to star as Sedgwick, but it was reported Tom Cruise convinced Holmes not to do it because it would be bad for her image. Regarding the rumors, Holmes said, "I declined the role in Factory Girl based on my own decisions about the movie." The role then went back to Miller. However, Holmes had also stated that even if she did take the part, she would have had to drop out because she was pregnant when the movie was set to begin filming.

== Release ==
=== Home media ===
The film was released on DVD by the Weinstein Company on July 17, 2007. It contains the Unrated Extended Edition of the film.

The film debuted on Blu-ray in Canada on March 8, 2011, in a Blu-ray/DVD combo pack. It contains the Unrated Cut.

== Critical reception ==
Factory Girl received generally negative reviews, but Sienna Miller's performance as Edie Sedgwick was met with critical acclaim. Johnny Vaughan from Sun Online concluded that "It's Sienna Miller's star that shines brightest in this heartbreaking cautionary tale." Empire magazine described Factory Girl as "A brave bid to recreate a modern American tragedy, with a revelatory turn by its lead actress." Mick LaSalle from San Francisco Chronicle said "Miller gets old and used up before our eyes, and we not only see it, we see what it means to experience it. This is a movie about power, and its spectacle is that of a woman losing all of it."

Stella Papamichael wrote for the BBC: "In all it's an unconvincing portrait, and as the Dylan clone says, "Empty, like one of those cans of soup...". Trevor Johnston for Time Out wrote "One wonders whether the documentary format would have better served the material than this ill-focused drama. Since real-life family and observers chime in over the end credits, perhaps the filmmakers were thinking the same thing." In The Guardian, Peter Bradshaw gave the film two out of five stars and said; "Edie Sedgwick's story is sad, but never appears important or interesting." Jim Lewis of Slate felt the film didn't do justice to Warhol's artistic accomplishments and concluded, "Factory Girl isn't just a bad movie, it's a 90-minute insult to the culture it pretends to be capturing."

On the review aggregator website Rotten Tomatoes, 21% of 112 critics' reviews are positive, with an average rating of 4.7/10. The website's consensus reads: "Despite a dedicated performance by Sienna Miller, Factory Girl delves only superficially into her character, and ultimately fails to tell a coherent story." Metacritic, which uses a weighted average, assigned the film a score of 45 out of 100, based on 27 critics, indicating "mixed or average" reviews.
