= Death of a Snowman =

- American theatrical release poster under the title Black Trash
- Directed by: Christopher Rowley
- Written by: Bima Stagg
- Produced by: Martin Wragge
- Starring: Nigel Davenport; Ken Gampu; Bima Stagg
- Cinematography: Fred Tammes
- Music by: Trevor Rabin
- Distributed by: Synapse Films (DVD)
- Release date: 1976
- Running time: 87 minutes
- Country: South Africa
- Language: English

Death of a Snowman (also released under the titles Soul Patrol, and Black Trash, is a 1976 action-crime thriller film directed by Christopher Rowley, written by Bima Stagg and produced by Martin Wragge. Starring Nigel Davenport, Ken Gampu and Bima Stagg, the film is recognized as a rare international crossover combining conventions of American blaxploitation cinema with the socio-political backdrop of apartheid-era South Africa. The film's musical score was composed by Trevor Rabin, who later gained international fame with the rock band Yes and as a film composer.

== Premise ==
In Johannesburg, high-profile figures in organized crime are systematically murdered. Steve Chaka (Ken Gampu), an investigative reporter, discovers that the killings are executed by a clandestine vigilante group known as "War on Crime." Chaka collaborates with police lieutenant Ben Deel (Nigel Davenport) to follow tips regarding upcoming targets, leading them into conflict with both the vigilantes and the criminal underworld as they attempt to uncover who is directing the group.

== Production and release ==
Principal photography took place on location in South Africa during the mid-1970s. Due to its interracial lead casting and sensitive socio-political backdrop, the film encountered varied international distribution channels and alternative titles across regional markets, including its release as Soul Patrol in North American home video markets. In 2010, the film received an authorized digital restoration and DVD release via Synapse Films.

== Critical reception ==
Critical coverage in Slant Magazine noted its distinctive blend of gritty urban crime aesthetics and South African regional commentary.
