= I Heard It Through the Grapevine (film) =

1982 documentary film starring James Baldwin

- Directed by: Dick Fontaine; Pat Hartley
- Starring: James Baldwin; Chinua Achebe; Amiri Baraka; Lonnie C. King Jr. Hosea Williams
- Cinematography: Ivan Strasburg
- Edited by: Julian Ware
- Release date: 1982
- Running time: 95 minutes
- Country: United Kingdom
- Language: English

I Heard It Through the Grapevine is a 1982 documentary film starring James Baldwin and directed by Dick Fontaine and Pat Hartley.

== Overview ==
Documentary film that features writer James Baldwin revisiting his time in the American South during the civil rights movement.

== Critical reception ==
The New Yorker said in its review, "“Grapevine” is a work of political history about the civil-rights movement—and about the ongoing failure of the United States to make good on the promise of justice and equality for Black Americans."

The New York Times wrote, "I Heard It Through the Grapevine, a free-form, feature-length documentary that hovers over its subject like a concerned parent who, not knowing quite what to make of things, expresses concern and sympathy."
