= Space (1965 film) =

- Directed by: Andy Warhol
- Written by: Ronald Tavel
- Produced by: Andy Warhol
- Starring: Edie Sedgwick; Gino Piserchio; Dorothy Dean; Eric Andersen; Norman Levine
- Production company: Andy Warhol Films
- Distributed by: The Factory
- Release date: July 1965
- Running time: 70 min.
- Country: United States
- Language: English

Space (1965) is an underground film directed by Andy Warhol, written by Ronald Tavel, and starring Edie Sedgwick, Gino Piserchio, Dorothy Dean, Ed Hennessey, singer-songwriter Eric Andersen, and Norman Levine. Unlike many of Warhol's other films made at The Factory, this film involved a moving camera, moving around the actors as they stood still.

== Plot ==
The film features a melange of casual talking, food fights, and folk singing. The film includes Eric Andersen with his guitar, singing his lines, and leading Edie Sedgwick and her friends in unscripted sing-alongs of popular songs including "Puff, the Magic Dragon" and "The Battle Hymn of the Republic".

== See also ==
- Andy Warhol filmography
