= Ivan Strasburg =

Ivan Strasberg
- Born: South Africa
- Occupation: Cinematographer
- Known for: The Killing Fields, The Mission

Ivan Strasburg is a South African born cinematographer known for such films as Bloody Sunday, The Killing Fields, The Mission, the documentary I Heard It Through the Grapevine, The Tale and Rita, Sue and Bob Too. He was also the cinematographer for the television series Trackers.

He has won two British Academy Television Craft Awards, for Cracker in 1993 and for Bloody Sunday in 2003. He has also been nominated for two Primetime Emmy Awards, both for Outstanding Cinematography for a Limited or Anthology Series or Movie, for the TV movie Live From Bagdad in 2003 and for the Generation Kill miniseries episode "Combat Jack" in 2009.

Strasburg was also a featured character in the concert film Swimming to Cambodia starring monologuist Spalding Gray speaking about his experiences working on the film The Killing Fields alongside Strasburg.
