= Beat This: A Hip-Hop History =

- Directed by: Dick Fontaine
- Narrated by: Imhotep Gary Byrd
- Country of origin: United Kingdom
- Original language: English

Production
- Running time: 60 minutes

Original release
- Network: BBC
- Release: 1984

Beat This: A Hip-Hop History is a 1984 BBC documentary film about hip-hop culture, directed by Dick Fontaine. The cast includes Afrika Bambaataa, DJ Kool Herc — the film includes footage from Herc's original dance parties — The Cold Crush Brothers, Jazzy Jay, Brim Fuentes, and The Dynamic Rockers. It is narrated by Imhotep Gary Byrd. Originally part of the Arena television series, it was among the first crop of documentaries about hip-hop.
