= What's the Worst That Could Happen? =

2001 American comedy film by Sam Weisman

- Theatrical film poster
- Directed by: Sam Weisman
- Screenplay by: Matthew Chapman
- Based on: What's the Worst That Could Happen? by Donald E. Westlake
- Produced by: Lawrence Turman; David Hoberman; Ashok Amritraj; Wendy Dytman
- Starring: Martin Lawrence; Danny DeVito
- Cinematography: Anastas N. Michols
- Edited by: Garth Craven; Nick Moore
- Music by: Tyler Bates
- Production companies: Metro-Goldwyn-Mayer Pictures; Hyde Park Entertainment; Turman-Morrisey Company
- Distributed by: MGM Distribution Co. (United States); 20th Century Fox (International)
- Release date: June 1, 2001
- Running time: 95 minutes
- Country: United States
- Language: English
- Budget: $60 million
- Box office: $38.4 million

What's the Worst That Could Happen? is a 2001 American crime comedy film directed by Sam Weisman and starring Martin Lawrence and Danny DeVito. Loosely based on a book by Donald E. Westlake, the film follows the misadventures of a skilled thief and a wealthy businessman facing financial trouble. The film did not meet expectations and performed poorly commercially.

Upon its release by MGM Distribution Co. on June 1, 2001, with 20th Century Fox releasing in other territories, What's the Worst That Could Happen? earned $38.4 million worldwide against its $60 million budget. Critics widely panned the film, with a 10% rating on Rotten Tomatoes. The film was criticized for its uninspiring script and lack of funny gags, and for underutilizing its cast. Reviewers like Roger Ebert and Lisa Schwarzbaum pointed out flaws in the film's character development, plot, and the mismatched acting styles of its stars.

== Plot ==
Kevin Caffery, a skilled thief, meets Amber Belhaven, who is auctioning her father's painting to settle a hotel bill. He discovers her hotel room and surprises her by returning the stolen painting. Kevin reveals his criminal activities to Amber, shocking her at first, but she accepts it in order to be with him. She eventually gives Kevin her father's lucky ring.

Meanwhile, Max Fairbanks, a wealthy businessman facing bankruptcy, seeks legal advice from his lawyer, Walter Greenbaum. Max, known for his extravagant spending, disregards the seriousness of the situation. He keeps spending and suggests declaring bankruptcy immediately to protect his assets. Max tells his wife, Lutetia, that his company is going through a technical procedure to hide the truth.

Through a friend and fellow thief named Berger, Kevin learns about Max's financial troubles. Berger informs him about Max's beachfront mansion, which Max is legally not allowed to enter due to bankruptcy. The pair proceed to rob the place, but unaware of Max's presence, Kevin is caught. Max notices Amber's ring, and forces Kevin to hand it over by claiming it was stolen. Kevin escapes from the police and returns to the mansion in revenge. He successfully robs many valuables, but is unable to recover the ring.

Walter notifies Max that he has angered the Court by going to his mansion. Max remains confident, believing the ring will bring him luck. Kevin and Berger hire a hacker named Shelly Nix to track Max's whereabouts by hacking into his email. During a flight, Max consults his psychic associate, Gloria, about the ring. Gloria draws a disturbing card but keeps it a secret. Max insults a judge he believed he bribed to save his house, leading to an order for its public auction. As the crooks continue to rob Max's properties, Max meets with Detective Alex Tardio and contacts his head of security, Earl Redburn.

Shelly informs Kevin that Max is heading to Washington, D.C. for a Senate hearing. Kevin learns that Max plans to bribe the senators and decides to replace the bribe money with an insulting note in Max's name. Max and Earl discover Kevin's presence in the apartment and a scuffle ensues. Kevin tries to steal the ring but ends up taking Max's wedding ring instead. Kevin calls Max during the hearing; the ensuing argument further tarnishes Max's reputation and leads Walter to resign. Amber realizes the feud has gone too far and breaks up with Kevin, no longer caring about the ring.

Lutetia finds Amber wearing a stolen jacket at a bar and confronts her. They realize they share a common situation and devise a plan. Gloria, concerned about Max, admits the gravity of the card she has repeatedly drawn and quits as his associate. She provides Max's company records to Detective Tardio.

At the bankruptcy auction, Lutetia sends Max a masseuse. The crooks, led by Kevin, steal as much as they can and escape, creating chaos by faking a fire. Kevin steals the ring from Max, who gives chase. Their conflict ends on a sinking boat, when they realize Kevin took a fake ring. They are discovered by Detective Tardio, who arrests Max, and Kevin claims to have been saving Max. Kevin thanks Max, and Amber reveals herself as the masseuse who stole the ring. She advises Kevin to throw it away due to its bad luck. Kevin does so, and the two reconcile.

Some time later, Kevin pretends to be Max's lawyer and manipulates a hearing in Max's favor, distracting the press by pointing out the presence of a Senator in the room. Kevin steals one of Max's watches as they part ways.

== Cast ==
- Martin Lawrence as Kevin Caffery
- Danny DeVito as Max Fairbanks
- John Leguizamo as Berger
- Glenne Headly as Gloria Sidell
- Carmen Ejogo as Amber Belhaven
- Bernie Mac as Uncle Jack
- Larry Miller as Earl Redburn, Security chief
- Nora Dunn as Lutetia Fairbanks
- Richard Schiff as Walter Greenbaum
- William Fichtner as Det. Alex Tardio
- Ana Gasteyer as Ann Marie
- GQ as Shelly Nix
- Siobhan Fallon Hogan as Edwina (as Siobhan Fallon)
- Lenny Clarke as Windham
- Sascha Knopf as Tracey "Miss September" Kimberly
- Cam Neely as Jerry - Detective
- Christy Scott Cashman as Roxanne (as Christy Scott-Cashman)
- Mike Jessel as Ice Cream Boy
- Tracey Gold as Woman at Auction (uncredited)
- Dana Wheeler-Nicholson as Gallery Hostess (uncredited)

== Production ==
The film was initially a potential United Artists project with Heath Ledger and James Gandolfini slated to star.

The film was shot in Beacon Hill, Boston.

== Reception ==
=== Critical reception ===
On the review aggregator website Rotten Tomatoes, 10% of 98 critics' reviews are positive, with an average rating of 3.5/10. The website's consensus reads: "Talented cast is squandered by an uninvolving script filled with unfunny gags." Metacritic, which uses a weighted average, assigned the film a score of 37 out of 100, based on 28 critics, indicating "generally unfavorable" reviews.

Roger Ebert of the Chicago Sun-Times gave the film an unfavorable review, stating that there were "too many characters, not enough plot, and a disconnect between the two stars' acting styles". Lisa Schwarzbaum of Entertainment Weekly also gave the film a negative review and said, "Maybe the worst thing that can happen is that every other movie at the multiplex will be sold out this weekend."

Kevin Thomas of the Los Angeles Times gave a mixed review and said, "Laborious in the unfolding of its plot, and under Sam Weisman's brash direction the unbashed amorality of the material is crass rather than sly in tone".

However, some positive reviews came from Chris Kattenbach of the Baltimore Sun and Mike Clark of USA Today.

=== Box office performance ===
The film had $13,049,114 during its opening weekend, and ranked #5 at the box office. It was released in 2,675 theaters, and grossed $4,878 average. At the end of its theatrical run, What's the Worst That Could Happen? has grossed $32,269,834 in the domestic market along with $6,194,297 in the foreign market for a worldwide total of $38,464,131. Therefore, the film was a box office flop, failing to recover its $60 million budget.

== Soundtrack ==
A soundtrack containing hip hop and R&B music was released on May 29, 2001, by Interscope Records. It peaked at 38 on the Billboard 200 and 6 on the Top R&B/Hip-Hop Albums.

Marc Shaiman, who wrote the score, told Playbill magazine that the "worst job" he ever had was "scoring a hideous movie called What's the Worst That Could Happen? I'm not kidding."
