= Dorothy Dean =

American actress (1932–1987)

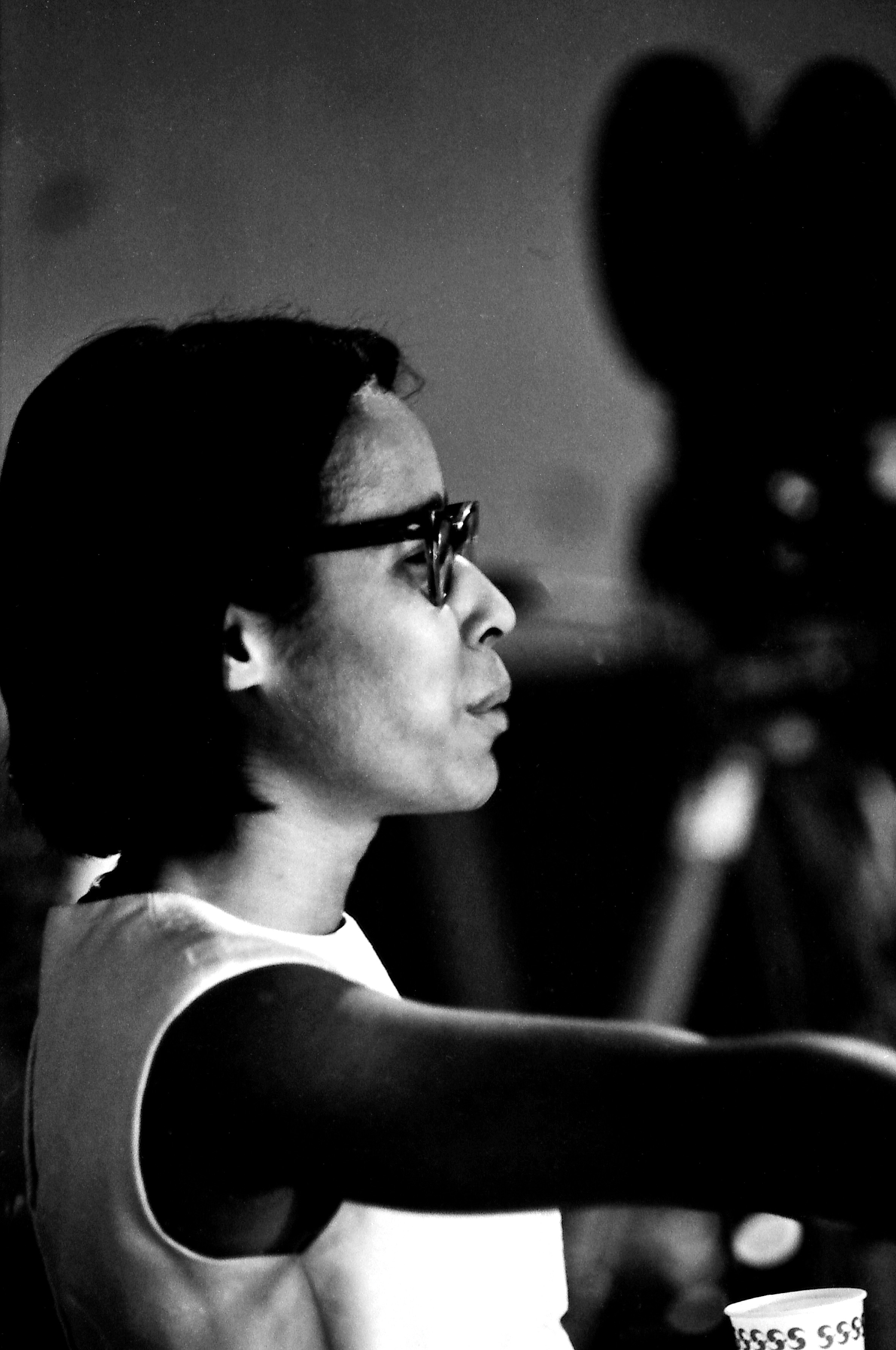
- Dean at Andy Warhol's Factory, 1965. Photo: Billy Name.
- Born: December 22, 1932; White Plains, New York, U.S.
- Died: February 13, 1987 (aged 54); Denver, Colorado, U.S.
- Education: Radcliffe College; Harvard University
- Occupations: Writer, actress

Dorothy Dean (December 22, 1932 – February 13, 1987) was an American writer, actress, and editor. She was associated with Pop artist Andy Warhol's Factory and the New York City's 1960s underground art scene. Although never a prolific published author during her lifetime, Dean became known for her wit and close friendships with artists, writers, and filmmakers. She appeared in several of Warhol's films, worked in magazine publishing, and was a bouncer at Max's Kansas City. She later became the subject of Who Are You Dorothy Dean? (2024), the first collection devoted to her writings and correspondence.

== Early life and education ==
Dorothy Dean was born on December 22, 1932, in White Plains, New York, into a middle-class family. Her father Reverend Elmer Wendell Dean was originally from Statesville, North Carolina, and eventually led congregations in New York and New Jersey. She had a sister named Carol.

She excelled academically and became the first African American valedictorian at White Plains High School. In 1954, she graduated from Radcliffe College in Cambridge, Massachusetts with a degree in philosophy before studying art history on a Fulbright scholarship in Amsterdam. In 1956, she began her Master of Fine Arts degree at Harvard University. While at Harvard, she became closely associated with a circle of white gay intellectuals she dubbed the "Lavender Brotherhood."

== Career ==
After graduating, Dean worked in the slide library at Brandeis University for two years before serving as typist and editorial assistant on art historian Sydney J. Freedberg's two-volume study of Italian Renaissance painting and sculpture.

In 1963, Dean moved to New York City without any prospects. She soon entered magazine publishing, becoming the first woman employed as a fact-checker at The New Yorker. After leaving The New Yorker, Dean held editorial positions at Vogue, Huntington Hartford's short-lived magazine Show, and Essence.

Dean became a familiar figure in New York's artistic and literary circles. She began visiting Pop artist Andy Warhol's Factory, appearing in several of his experimental films including Batman Dracula (1964), Afternoon (1965), My Hustler (1965), Restaurant (1965), Chelsea Girls (1966), and Superartist (1967).

In the late 1960s, Dean began working as a bouncer at Max's Kansas City after Abigail Rosen sought a replacement for Nawana Davis. Rosen recalled, "I tell my incredibly chic gay pals Michael Maslansky and Frank Macfie that I need an assistant. They tell somebody and somebody else tells somebody else and next thing I know, Mickey is groveling at my feet thanking me for Dorothy Dean. I had never met the woman." She was known for her imposing presence at the club's back room. David Smith, who was a bartender at the nightclub, said, "I can remember romancing Jay Johnson, and Dorothy Dean coming right over to the table and screaming at me that she didn't approve of me for him." In her memoir Just Kids (2010), singer Patti Smith described Dean as "small, black and brilliant," writing that she "stood before the entrance to the back room like an Abyssinian priest guarding the Ark."

Dean appeared as "Black Barbarella" in American Cream (1971), a gay porn film directed by her friend Jean-Claude van Itallie.

During the mid-1970s she self-published All-Lavender Cinema Courier, an eight-issue newsletter devoted to film criticism. In 1979, Dean applied to Harvard Law School but moved to Boulder, Colorado, in 1980 at the suggestion of a friend. She supported herself by working in a bookstore before becoming a copy editor and proofreader for the Daily Camera, where she worked from 1981 to 1986.

== Personal life ==
Dean was a close friend of Arthur Loeb, the son of investment banker John Loeb, a founding partner of the firm Loeb, Rhoades & Co., and Frances Lehman Loeb, a member of the Lehman banking family. Dean met Arthur while they were undergraduates at Harvard, and because he had limited use of his left arm and leg, she worked for him as a typist. The two remained close friends for many years, and although their relationship was platonic, Arthur proposed marriage to her. According to a friend of Dean's, John Loeb offered her money not to marry his son, which she refused, responding, "I won't marry Arthur because I don't want to. But I won't not marry him because you say don't marry him."

In early 1956, Dean gave birth to a son, whom she placed for adoption shortly after his birth. She did not publicly reveal the identity of the child's father, and her friend Arthur Loeb helped cover her expenses during the pregnancy.

Dean had a affair with former investment adviser Rollins Maxwell.

Friends and acquaintances recalled Dean's outspoken personality and heavy drinking. Among her nicknames were "Nurse Dean" and "The Curd of Human Kindness." Abigail Rosen, the first door person at Max's Kansas City, said despite Dean's fearsome reputation, she found her "actually warm." Rosen believed that Dean often made provocative and outrageous remarks because "she wanted to make sure that people didn't think she was ordinary. Being ordinary was the cardinal sin in those days."

Dean met poet Robert Creeley through Mickey Ruskin, the owner of Max's Kansas City. According to poet Gerard Malanga, both Dean and Creeley had been drinking when an exchange between them escalated, and Dean struck Creeley in the face. Despite the incident, Creeley later praised Dean's intelligence and the two became close friends, with Creeley writing a poem inspired by their first encounter.

Bob Russell, a bouncer at Max's Kansas City, said that Dean was infatuated with gay men, particularly a man she nicknamed the "Sugar Plum Fairy," who was referenced in musician Lou Reed's 1972 song "Walk on the Wild Side." Russell recalled that Dean was "often found in leather bars in the West Village in pursuit of the Sugar Plum Fairy. That was her love, and then Lou Reed became the focus of her life."

From 1963 to 1979, Dean lived in an apartment on Morton Street in Greenwich Village.

=== Racial identity ===
Dean's relationship to race was a defining yet often paradoxical aspect of her public persona. Although she was African American, friends observed that she largely rejected racial identification and instead cultivated an identity centered on New York's white gay intellectual and artistic circles. Dean once remarked, "I am a white faggot trapped in a black woman's body," while critic John Simon wrote that "if anyone had told her she was black, it would have come to her as an astonishing revelation." One of her Harvard friends similarly recalled, "Nobody discussed Dorothy's race; people didn't know how to. She had so much unhappiness because she was transcending race by being 'just Dorothy.'"

In a 1995 essay for The New Yorker, writer Hilton Als argued that Dean sought acceptance within the white cultural elite while distancing herself from the politics of the civil rights movement. Als wrote that she often employed deliberately provocative racial language, including referring to writer and civil rights activist James Baldwin as "Martin Luther Queen," and using racial slurs in conversation. According to Als, Dean's rhetoric blurred "the line between parody and participation." He concluded that Dean fashioned herself into "an ironic metaphor for upper-class gay sexuality and privilege," adopting the manners, speech, and style of the WASP elite in what one Harvard friend described as "out-Wasping the Wasps."

== Death ==
Dean died of cancer at the Hospice of St. John in Denver, Colorado on February 13, 1987. A memorial service was held for Dean at the Friends Meeting House in New York City.

== Legacy ==
New York University holds a collection of letters to Joe Campbell from Dorothy Dean dated between 1964-1987. They also hold additional correspondence between Dean and her mother, as well as between Dean and her friends such as Edie Sedgewick, Harvey Milk, Paul Schmidt, and Jean-Claude van Itallie.

Dorothy Dean appears in Andy Warhol's book A, A Novel (1968) as the character 'Dodo Mae Doom'. She also appears in Lynne Tillman's Cast in Doubt (1975) as 'Gwen', as 'Dee Dee Beane' in Darryl Pinckney's High Cotton (1992), and as herself in James McCourt's Time Remaining (1993).

Dean is one of the subjects of Hilton Als' 1996 book The Women. The essay had appeared previously in the April 24, 1995 issue of The New Yorker.

Her writing was collected along with essays on her life in Who are you Dorothy Dean?, published in 2024 and edited by Anaïs Ngbanzo. This was then adapted into Dorothy, A Play (2024), also written by Ngbanzo.

== Filmography ==
- Batman Dracula (1964)
- Space (1965)
- My Hustler (1965)
- Afternoon (1965)
- Prison (1965)
- Chelsea Girls (1966),
- Superartist (1967)
- American Cream (1971)
