= Sam Weisman =

American film director

- Born: May 21, 1947 (age 79); Binghamton, New York, U.S.
- Education: BA (Music history), Yale, 1969; MFA (Acting / Directing), Brandeis University, 1973
- Alma mater: Yale University; Brandeis University
- Occupations: Film / television director / producer, actor
- Years active: 1973–present
- Spouse: Constance McCashin (m. 1978)
- Children: 2
- Relatives: David Weisman (brother)

Sam Weisman (born April 21, 1947) is an American film / television director, film producer and former actor. He has directed the films D2: The Mighty Ducks, Bye Bye Love, George of the Jungle, The Out-of-Towners, What's the Worst That Could Happen?, and Dickie Roberts: Former Child Star. Weisman is a 1973 graduate of Brandeis University's MFA program in Acting and Directing. He earned a BA in Music History from Yale University, where he was a member of the second longest running a cappella group in the nation, The Society of Orpheus and Bacchus.

== Personal life ==
His brother was the film producer David Weisman.

Sam Weisman is married to former Knots Landing actress Constance McCashin, with whom he has two children: Marguerite Weisman, a book editor, and Daniel Weisman, formerly a music manager, who managed Capital Cities, Wale and Mike Posner, now in wealth management.

== Directorial / Producer credits ==
- Dickie Roberts: Former Child Star (2003)
- What's the Worst That Could Happen? (2001)
- The Out-of-Towners (1999)
- George of the Jungle (1997)
- Bye Bye Love (1995)
- D2: The Mighty Ducks (1994)
- Mimi & Me (1991)
- The Art of Being Nick (1986)
- Taking It Home (1986)
