= My Hustler =

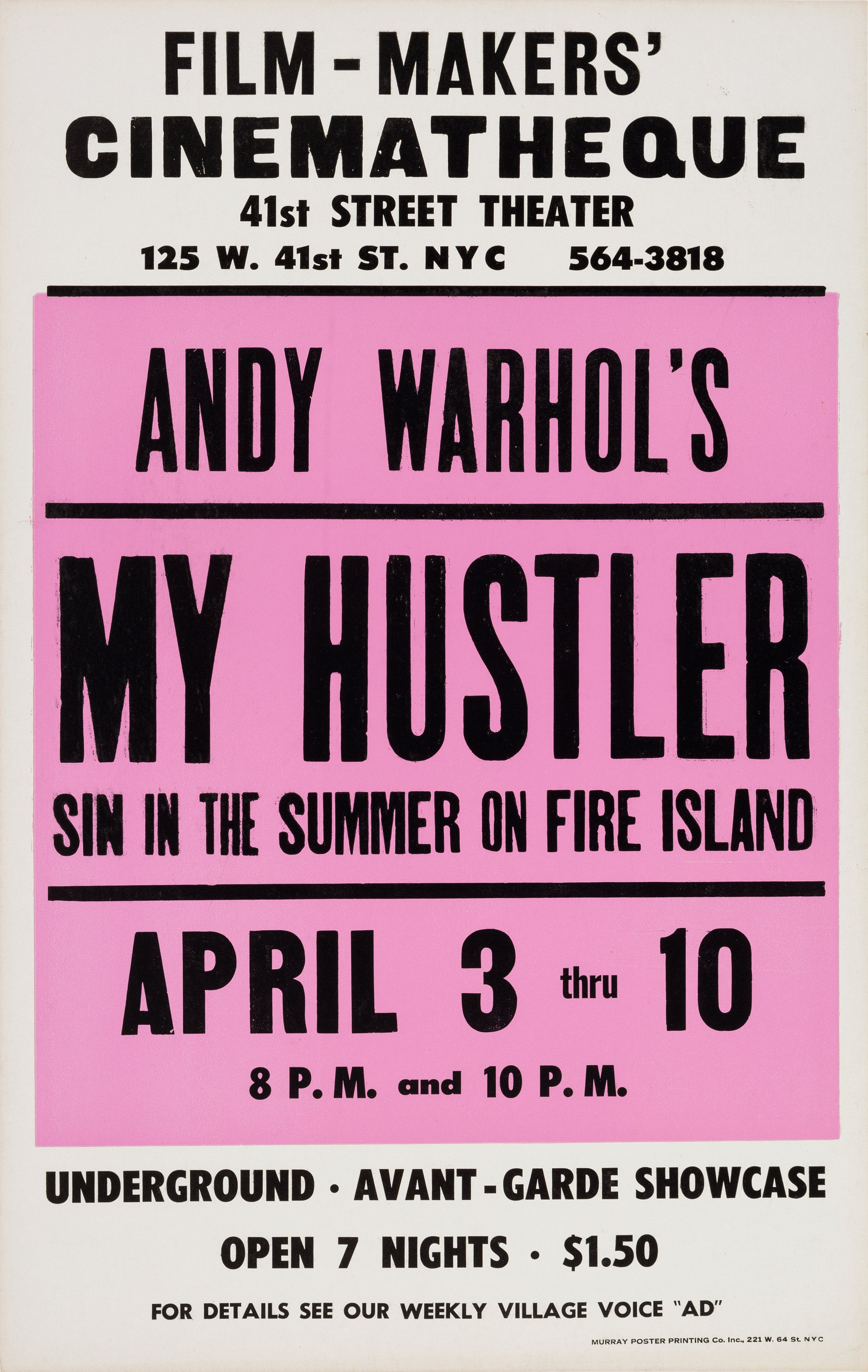
- Directed by: Andy Warhol; Chuck Wein
- Starring: Ed Hood; Paul America; Joe Campbell; Genevieve Charbin; Dorothy Dean
- Release date: 1965
- Running time: 76 minutes
- Country: United States
- Budget: $500

My Hustler is a 1965 American drama film by Andy Warhol and Chuck Wein. Set on Fire Island, My Hustler depicts competition over the affections of a young male hustler (Paul America) among a straight woman (Genevieve Charbon), a former male hustler (Joe Campbell), and the man who hired the boy’s companionship (Ed Hood) via a “Dial-A-Hustler” service.

== Production ==
The film is a collaboration between Warhol, Chuck Wein, and Paul Morrissey, with Morrissey as camera and audio operator and Wein credited as director, and was filmed over Labor Day Weekend, 1965, on Fire Island, NY using a 16mm Auricon news camera. My Hustler is the first Warhol film worked on by Paul Morrissey, who introduced, in this film, camera movement and audible sound to Warhol's cinematography.

== Cast ==
- Paul America as Paul, A Young Male Hustler
- Genevieve Charbon as Genevieve
- Joe Campbell as A Former Male Hustler
- Ed Hood as Ed
- Dorothy Dean as Woman With Lipstick
- J.D. McDermott as Kali

== Release ==
=== Distribution ===
The first advertisement for a screening of My Hustler appeared in the 6 January 1966 issue of the Village Voice for screenings on the 12th, 13th and 14 January at 8 and 10 pm at the Filmmakers' Cinematheque and was mentioned in the New York Times on January 30. On January 20, a "special notice" in The Village Voice informed the reader that the film would play "every midnight indefinitely" due to public demand. It ended its first run at the Filmmakers' Cinematheque in the middle of April, 1966. Opening at the more mainstream Hudson Theater in July 1967, the film was shown near-continuously in New York City through the end of 1968. The film first showed in Los Angeles and Chicago in early July 1966 and then ran near-continuously in L.A. and Chicago through 1969. The film was also shown in Tucson, San Bernardino, Albuquerque, Akron, and Indianapolis in 1966-67.

=== Revivals ===
Several revivals of My Hustler have occurred in New York City since 1969, although the provenance of some of these showings is uncertain due to Andy Warhol withdrawing his films from distribution between 1970 and 1984. In 1984, with Warhol's approval, the Museum of Modern Art and the Whitney Museum embarked on a joint archival research project to catalog Warhol's extensive film collection, investigate its history, and preserve and re-release all of the films along with scholarly research and publication.

Since 1988, My Hustler has been screened multiple times at both museums as part of the project. However, similarly to other Warhol films, it has not been released on any commercial medium, such as DVD. This preservation effort has provided scholars and film enthusiasts with valuable access to these important works of American avant-garde cinema. The project has allowed for a deeper understanding and appreciation of Warhol's contributions to the film industry and art world, while also preserving these works for future generations.

== Reception ==
=== Box office ===
My Hustler was the first Warhol film to make any money, grossing $4,000 from its initial run at the Filmmaker's Cinematheque. At the Hudson theater in New York, it grossed $52,400 in its first 3 weeks.

=== Critical reception ===
A common expression at the time of the film's initial release described the work as being revolutionary. New York Times critic Bosley Crowther wrote:

"It is sordid, vicious and contemptuous. The only thing engaging about it is a certain quality and tone of degradation that is almost too candid and ruthless to be believed."

A few years later the revolutionary nature of My Hustler was being recognised; Vincent Canby, in somewhat backwards and grudging praise, complained that distributors were taking his critical remarks out of context and using them as advertising come-ons:

"Warhol, of course, is responsible for one of the toughest dilemmas facing critics today. Largely as a result of his pioneering in the making of movies like Chelsea Girls and My Hustler, it's impossible to accurately describe many new movies without automatically writing phrases that can't be picked up and used as instant come-ons."

By 1995, the critical perspective of Warhol's most influential films, including My Hustler had shifted to an appreciation of their unique, semi-documentary perspective, Stephen Holden:

"The esthetic running through Warhol's films is an icy voyeurism. As witty or sexy or photogenic as Warhol's superstars may have been, their largely unstructured, crudely edited play-acting in front of his camera could also be cruelly revealing. Again and again, one has the feeling of confronting people with limited internal resources, desperate to be noticed at any cost."

== Censorship ==
My Hustler was the subject of plainclothes police surveillance in the audience during its initial theatrical release in 1966, and on April 12 the owners of the Filmmakers' Cinematheque were served a summons to a hearing to show cause why the theater's license should not be revoked for showing films of "sexual immorality, lewdness, perversion and homosexuality." On November 16, after a defence by the New York Civil Liberties Union, the charges were thrown out.

== See also ==
- List of American films of 1965
- Andy Warhol filmography
