= Beauty No. 2 =

- Film poster
- Directed by: Andy Warhol
- Written by: Chuck Wein
- Starring: Edie Sedgwick; Gino Piserchio; Chuck Wein
- Release date: July 17, 1965
- Running time: 66 minutes
- Country: United States
- Language: English

Beauty No. 2 is a 1965 American avant-garde film by directed by Andy Warhol and starring Edie Sedgwick and Gino Piserchio. Chuck Wein also has a role in the film but never appears onscreen. Wein wrote the scenario and is also credited as assistant director.

== Synopsis ==
The movie has a fixed point of view showing a bed with two characters on it, Sedgwick and Piserchio. The film's writer, Chuck Wein is heard speaking but is just out of view. Sedgwick is wearing a lace bra and panties, and Piserchio, wearing only jockey shorts, engage in flirting and light kissing. Wein asks Sedgwick questions seemingly designed to harass and annoy her. Piserchio is more or less a bystander not interacting with Wein.

The dialogue was ad-libbed and no conclusions are reached in the film. The only conceivable climax is when Sedgwick finally becomes so mad at Wein's taunts, she throws a glass ashtray at Wein, breaking it.

== Reception ==
Beauty No. 2 was filmed in June 1965 and premiered at the Cinematheque at the Astor Place Playhouse in New York City on July 17, 1965. Critical reviews were generally positive with some critics comparing Edie Sedgwick's screen presence to Marilyn Monroe.

== See also ==
- List of American films of 1965
- Andy Warhol filmography
