= Chuck Wein =

American film director

- Born: March 24, 1939
- Died: March 18, 2008 (aged 68); Del Mar, California, U.S.
- Education: Harvard University
- Occupations: Promoter and manager of entertainment acts

Chuck Wein (March 24, 1939 – March 18, 2008) was an American promoter and filmmaker. He was closely associated with Pop artist Andy Warhol's Factory and the New York underground film scene of the 1960s. A Harvard graduate and friend of socialite Edie Sedgwick from Cambridge, Wein became an instrumental collaborator in several Warhol films in 1965, including Poor Little Rich Girl, Beauty No. 2, and My Hustler. He also co-wrote and co-directed the cult film Ciao! Manhattan in 1967, a semi-autobiographical film centered on Sedgwick's life and decline. He later directed the Jimi Hendrix concert film Rainbow Bridge (1971).

== Biography ==
=== Early life and education ===
Wein was born in Rhode Island in 1939 and grew up, by his own account, "between Beverly Hills and Las Vegas." His father worked as a mafia lawyer in Las Vegas. Wein attended Beverly Hills High School before moving to Pittsburgh and graduated from Taylor Allderdice High School in 1956.

At Harvard University in Cambridge, Wein was nicknamed "Chuckles" by socialite Dorothy Dean because of his exuberant personality. Originally intending to study nuclear physics, he developed interests in Chinese history, Taoist philosophy, psychedelic drugs, and spiritual exploration. Known for his charismatic conversational style, Wein attracted a devoted circle of friends and acquaintances, some of whom later described him as a Svengali-like figure with a talent for identifying and influencing unconventional personalities. After graduating from Harvard in 1960, he traveled to Asia and North Africa. While in Tangier, Wein tutored William S. Burroughs' son, William S. Burroughs Jr.

Wein returned to Cambridge, where he adopted the style of an Edwardian dandy, became a successful racetrack bettor, and lived a bohemian lifestyle. In March 1964, Wein's friend Ed Hennessy introduced him to socialite Edie Sedgwick, the great-niece of the Atlantic Monthly editor Ellery Sedgwick and the great-granddaughter of the Rev. Endicott Peabody (Groton's founder), at the Casablanca bar in Harvard Square. Wein and Sedgwick moved to New York in 1964, where he became her promoter and informal manager. Wein later described recognizing her raw appeal but also her lack of organization, which led him to assume a controlling role in shaping her early public image.

=== Andy Warhol and the Factory ===
In March 1965, Wein and Sedgwick met Pop artist Andy Warhol at a party for Tennessee Williams hosted by producer Lester Persky. Wein later described his involvement with Warhol as accidental, recalling that Warhol asked him at the party if he would write a film for him. When later asked why he chose Wein as a scriptwriter, Warhol replied, "When I met him at the party I couldn't think of anything else to say." Wein and Edie Sedgwick soon became regular figures at Warhol's Factory, and accompanied Warhol to Paris for his May 1965 exhibition at the Ileana Sonnabend Gallery.

Wein emerged as an important creative collaborator in Warhol's underground films, describing their approach as "Reel-Real," in which "the reel is creating the reality," and actors could not be separated from their lives. He appeared in one of Warhol's Screen Tests and contributed ideas and production assistance to several films starring Sedgwick in 1965, including Poor Little Rich Girl, Face, Restaurant, Beauty No. 1, and Beauty No. 2. Wein conceived and served as assistant director on Beauty No. 2, in which his off-screen voice interrogates Sedgwick throughout the largely improvised film. Although credited as the film's writer, the production was largely improvised in keeping with Warhol's filmmaking methods.

Wein also played a major role in the production of My Hustler, which he and Dorothy Dean conceived as "an anatomy of hustling, male and female." Later in 1965, Wein and his friend Dan Williams developed another proposed Warhol feature, Jane Heir (also known as Jane Eyre Bare), intended to star Sedgwick and be filmed in the Bahamas with backing from A&P heir Huntington Hartford. Both Wein and Ronald Tavel were asked to prepare scripts for the unreleased project. Wein's association with Warhol ended after disagreements surrounding the production.

=== Later years and death ===
After Sedgwick left the Factory, he co-wrote and directed Sedgwick in the avant-garde film Ciao! Manhattan in 1967. Production was halted amid Sedgwick's struggles with substance use, before later being revived by filmmakers John Palmer and David Weisman and released in 1972.

In later years, Wein directed the Jimi Hendrix concert film Rainbow Bridge (1971).

Wein died in Del Mar, California died on March 18, 2008.

== In pop culture ==
Wein was portrayed by Jimmy Fallon in George Hickenlooper's Factory Girl (2006), a cinematic retelling of Edie Sedgwick's (Sienna Miller) life, with particular emphasis on her brief time with Andy Warhol (Guy Pearce).
