= David Weisman =

American film producer (1942–2019)

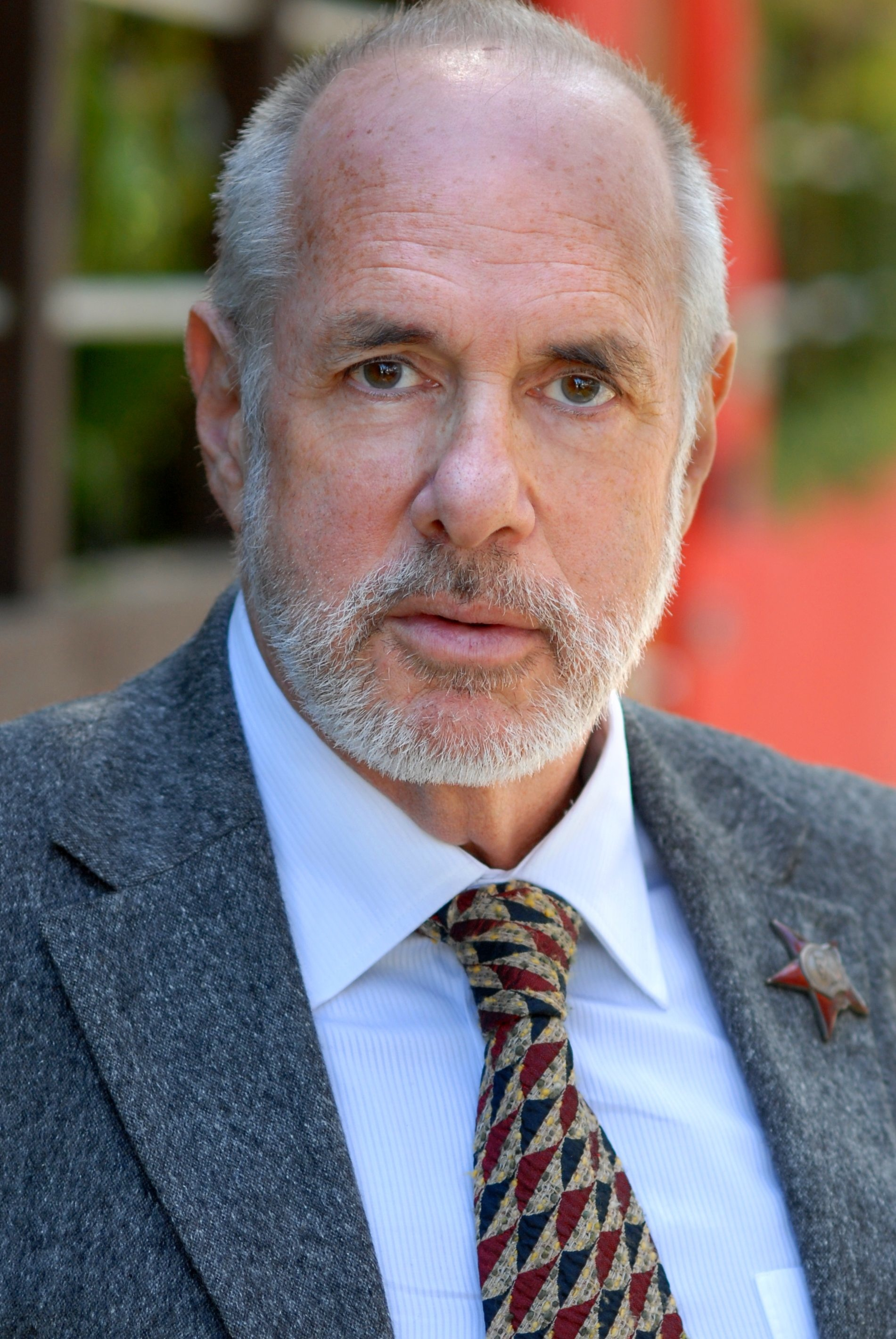
- David Weisman in 2009
- Born: March 11, 1942; Binghamton, New York, U.S.
- Died: October 9, 2019 (aged 77)
- Occupations: Film producer, film director, author, graphic artist
- Years active: 1967–2019
- Relatives: Sam Weisman (brother)

David Weisman (born March 11, 1942 – October 9, 2019) was an American film producer, author, and graphic artist, most noted for his films Ciao! Manhattan and Kiss of the Spider Woman. He was the brother of film director Sam Weisman.

== Film career ==
After one viewing of La Dolce Vita (1960), Weisman dropped out of Syracuse University's School of Fine Arts to design film-posters in Rome – where, by learning fluent Italian, he managed to meet Federico Fellini, create the poster for Otto e mezzo (8 1/2) and work for Pier Paolo Pasolini. In the mid-1960s, Weisman worked as Otto Preminger's assistant and designed the graphics and title sequence for his 1967 Paramount Production, Hurry Sundown.

In 1967, Weisman was part of a splinter group from Andy Warhol's Factory who collaborated to make the experimental film, Ciao! Manhattan, which Weisman eventually wound up co-directing with John Palmer and starring Edie Sedgwick. The film was not released until 1972 (almost five years after production began) but received little attention until 1982 when Edie: An American Biography, by Jean Stein and George Plimpton, was released and quickly became a bestseller.

Weisman's gift for languages (with fluency in French, Italian, Portuguese, Spanish, German, and Dutch) made him an "incurable nomad"; by the early 1980s, while in Brazil, he met and befriended fellow expat Manuel Puig. Although Puig had repeatedly resisted other filmmakers' attempts to acquire screen rights to his fourth novel, Kiss of the Spider Woman, Weisman assembled an impressive team of actors and filmmakers, (including Burt Lancaster and Hector Babenco) convincing Puig to sell Weisman the rights. Weisman developed the film over several years, engaging Leonard Schrader to write the screenplay and William Hurt (replacing Burt Lancaster in the role of "Molina") to star opposite Raul Julia as "Valentine". For his role as the film's sole producer, Weisman was honored with an Best Picture nomination at the 58th Academy Awards on March 24, 1986, at which event William Hurt won the Oscar for Best Actor.

On May 13, 2010, the film was honored upon its 25th anniversary as Cannes Classics opening selection at the 63rd annual Cannes International Film Festival. On July 10, 2010 The New York Times wrote about Weisman's efforts to preserve the extensive Kiss of the Spider Woman archive as an historical artifact.

Weisman's other films included Naked Tango, directed and written by Leonard Schrader and starring Vincent D'Onofrio, Mathilda May, Esai Morales, and Fernando Rey, filmed in Argentina with 1925 period "look" overseen by Weisman's co-producer, the Oscar-winning designer, Milena Canonero. Spike of Bensonhurst, directed by Paul Morrissey and starring Sasha Mitchell and Ernest Borgnine, and Shogun Assassin, a compilation of Japanese Samurai films (dubbed in English), released by Roger Corman's New World Pictures. Weisman was credited by Quentin Tarantino in Kill Bill: Volume 2 for clips used from Shogun Assassin.

In 2006, Weisman co-authored a book with Melissa Painter for Chronicle Books about Edie Sedgwick called Edie: Girl on Fire. He was at work on a documentary with the same title.

Since 2008, Weisman was working with Paul Schrader and Indian writer Mushtaq Shiekh, author of two Shah Rukh Khan biographies and screenwriter of Khan's Om Shanti Om, to produce a bilingual action thriller, Xtrme City. Schrader describes the film as, "cross-cultural entertainment that merges the cinematic traditions of Bollywood and Hollywood." Martin Scorsese will co-produce the picture with Shah Rukh Khan and Weisman.

In 2012, Weisman hired Paul Schrader to write a screenplay entitled Little K about legendary ballerina Mathilde Kschessinska, notorious femme fatale of the Romanov era and mistress to last Tsar Nicholas II, the film to be financed by the V.Vinokur Fund for the Support of Russian Arts and Culture under auspices of the Kremlin.

In 2014, The Hollywood Reporter described Weisman's litigation claim in U.S. Federal Court concerning Edie Sedgwick's name and likeness rights under the headline, "Judge Wraps Up Lawsuit Over Images of Andy Warhol Superstar Edie Sedgwick: The producer-director of ‘Ciao!Manhattan' gains a limited victory over Sedgwick’s husband”.

In 2019, The Superior Court of the State of California for the County of Santa Barbara ruled that the "publicity rights" to Edie Sedgwick belong to David Weisman, and not to her widower Michael Post. The judge ruled that Edie was not a "deceased personality" at the time of her death, because her publicity rights did not have commercial value at the time of or as a result of her death on November 16, 1971, and she had signed all of her publicity rights to David Weisman in her contract for Ciao! Manhattan.

== Selected filmography ==
- 1967 Hurry Sundown (title designer)
- 1972 Ciao! Manhattan (producer/co-director)
- 1980 Shogun Assassin (producer)
- 1981 The Killing of America (producer)
- 1984 Growing Pains (executive producer)
- 1985 Kiss of the Spider Woman (producer)
- 1991 Naked Tango (producer)
- 2008 Kiss of the Spider Woman: Making the Musical (director)
- 2008 Manuel Puig: The Submissive Woman's Role (director)
- 2008 Tangled Web: Making Kiss of the Spider Woman (director)
- 2010 Edie: Girl on Fire (director)
- 2011 Xtrme City (producer)
- 2013 Little K (American producer)
