= Edie Sedgwick =

American model and actress (1943–1971)

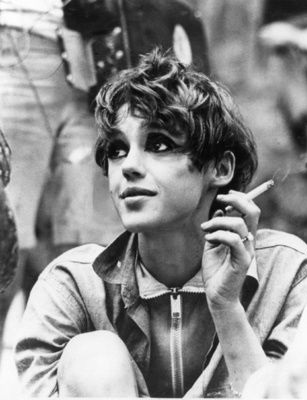
- Sedgwick in 1967
- Born: Edith Minturn Sedgwick; April 20, 1943; Santa Barbara, California, U.S.
- Died: November 16, 1971 (aged 28); Santa Barbara, California, U.S.
- Resting place: Oak Hill Cemetery
- Other name: Edith Sedgwick Post
- Occupations: Actress; model
- Years active: 1965–1971
- Known for: Warhol superstar, socialite
- Relatives: Sedgwick family (paternal); Henry deForest (maternal grandfather); Endicott Peabody (maternal great-grandfather)

Edith Minturn Sedgwick Post (April 20, 1943 – November 16, 1971) was an American actress, model, and socialite. Best known as a Warhol superstar, Vogue named her a "Youthquaker" in 1965, recognizing her influence on youth culture and style.

Born in California into a prominent New England family, Sedgwick briefly studied sculpture in Cambridge before moving to New York City in 1964. The following year, she became a muse to Pop artist Andy Warhol and starred in several of his underground films, including Poor Little Rich Girl (1965) and Beauty No. 2 (1965). Her distinctive style and exuberant personality made her an "it girl" of the mid-1960s. After leaving Warhol's Factory scene in 1966, she pursued acting independently but never regained the same level of prominence. Her mental health deteriorated amid drug abuse, and she struggled to complete the semi-autobiographical film Ciao! Manhattan (1972). Sedgwick died of an overdose in 1971 at the age of 28.

== Early life and education (1943–1963) ==
=== Family background and early childhood ===
Edith "Edie" Minturn Sedgwick was born at Cottage Hospital in Santa Barbara, California on April 20, 1943. She was the seventh of eight children of Alice Delano de Forest (1908–1988) and Francis Minturn Sedgwick (1904–1967). Her father was a rancher, sculptor, and member of the historical Sedgwick family of Massachusetts. Her maternal grandfather Henry Wheeler de Forest was the president and chairman of the board of the Southern Pacific Railroad. Her maternal great-grandfather, Reverend Endicott Peabody, founded the Groton School in Groton, Massachusetts. She was named after her father's aunt, Edith Minturn Stokes. She was of English and French Huguenot ancestry.

Despite the family's wealth and social prominence, Sedgwick's childhood was marked by isolation and strict parental control. Raised primarily on her father's California ranches, she and her siblings were homeschooled, cared for by nannies, and sheltered from the outside world. Her sister Alice "Saucie" Sedgwick recalled, "We really lived in two worlds—indoors and outdoors. Outdoors, that vast physical world of the ranch, was just pure freedom and elation, especially if you were out riding alone. Indoors meant inside the main house with the family. That was the world of form—very strict rules of conduct, all repressive, all belonging to that other world in the East that my parents were from." The family's fortunes increased in the early 1950s after oil was discovered on Rancho Corral de Quati, generating substantial income and enabling the purchase of the larger nearby Rancho La Laguna in 1952.

Several of Sedgwick's siblings had conflicted relationships with their father, whom they called "Fuzzy" because he "didn't want to be called Daddy." As an adult, Sedgwick told friends that he had attempted to molest her several times, beginning when she was aged 7. It was within these familial conditions that Sedgwick, by her early teens, developed an eating disorder, settling into a pattern of binging and purging.

=== Boarding schools and mental health treatment ===
At age 13, following the death of her grandfather Henry Dwight Sedgwick, she attended The Branson School near San Francisco. According to her sister Alice, she was soon withdrawn from the school because of anorexia and she returned to an abusive home life. Sedgwick told her friend Gillian Walker that "her father would come after her and lock her up and force her to stay in bed—a helpless, isolated prisoner, a drugged princess." Her brother, Jonathan Sedgwick, recalled that after she discovered their father having sex with a mistress, he slapped her and dismissed her account as delusional, then had her sedated by a doctor. "Mummy wouldn't believe her—she just had a blockage against things like that. Nobody'd believe her, so she was really a prisoner," he said.

In 1958, Sedgwick's parents enrolled her at St. Timothy's School in Maryland. She was eventually taken out of the school due to her eating disorder. In the autumn of 1962, at her father's insistence, Sedgwick was committed to the private Silver Hill Hospital in New Canaan, Connecticut. Since the regime was very lax, she easily manipulated her situation and her weight kept dropping. She was later sent to Bloomingdale, the Westchester Division of New York Hospital, where her anorexia improved. After her release from Bloomingdale, she had an affair with a Harvard student and underwent an abortion.

== Cambridge period and move to New York (1963–1964) ==
Sedgwick moved to Cambridge, Massachusetts, where she had family, and made her debut as a debutante in June 1963. In the autumn, she began taking private sculpting lessons from her cousin, artist Lily Saarinen. During this period, she partied with members of an elite bohemian fringe of the Cambridge social scene and was drawn to the local gay community. Sedgwick became a regular at the Casablanca bar, where she met Harvard graduate Chuck Wein, who became her companion.

On her twenty-first birthday in April 1964, Sedgwick received an $80,000 ($861,811 in 2026) trust fund from her maternal grandmother. Soon after, Sedgwick and Wein left Cambridge for New York City, where she intended to pursue modeling. That summer, she moved in with her grandmother, who lived at East 71st Street and Park Avenue. She quickly immersed herself in the city's social scene and developed a reputation for extravagant spending on clothes and the Bermuda Limousine Service.

Her friend Tom Goodwin recalled that she embraced New York's nightlife, frequenting expensive restaurants such as L'Avventura, often treating friends to lavish meals and hiring Goodwin as her chauffeur for $100 a week. Danny Fields similarly remembered her treating large groups of acquaintances to dinner while ignoring mounting bills. According to Goodwin, Sedgwick exhausted her trust fund in about six months and reacted with disbelief when informed that the money was gone, insisting that, given her family's wealth, she should have unlimited access to funds.

Later that year, she moved into an apartment at 16 East 63rd Street in Manhattan's Lenox Hill neighborhood on the Upper East Side. In December 1964, Sedgwick was injured in an automobile accident while visiting California when she ran a flashing red light. Her friend G. J. Barker-Benfield was sitting in the passenger seat; his head went through the windshield, but he survived.

During this period, Sedgwick was deeply affected by the loss of her older brothers, Francis Jr. (known as "Minty") and Robert (known as "Bobby"), who died within eighteen months of each other. Francis, who had a particularly unhappy relationship with their father, suffered several mental breakdowns, eventually dying by suicide in 1964 while at Silver Hill Hospital. Robert also suffered from mental health problems and died after falling into a coma when his motorcycle crashed into the side of a New York City bus on New Year's Eve 1965.

== Andy Warhol and the Factory (1965–1966) ==
=== Rise at the Factory and early films ===
On March 26, 1965, Sedgwick met Pop artist Andy Warhol during a party for playwright Tennessee Williams at Lester Persky's apartment, where she performed an improvised "ballet-like" dance. Sedgwick and Wein had discussed experimental nightlife concepts, including an "underwater discotheque," where she'd dance ballet to Bach played at rock 'n' roll tempo." Sedgwick attended the party wearing her brunette hair in a beehive style. Struck by her appearance, Warhol reportedly exclaimed, "Oh, she's so bee-you-ti-ful." During the party, Ronald Tavel approached her and said he was scouting for stars, remarking that she resembled Nyoka the Jungle Girl.

Although Sedgwick knew little about Warhol, Wein brought her to his studio, the Factory, where Warhol suggested they collaborate. Sedgwick fascinated Warhol, and he immediately put her in the film Horse. Although the film Vinyl originally featured an all-male cast, Warhol inserted Sedgwick into the project, and she became the central figure in a majority of his films in 1965. Warhol dubbed Sedgwick his new "superstar," succeeding Baby Jane Holzer, and their frequent public appearances helped popularize the term.

Sedgwick starred in a series of films originally conceived as a 24-hour portrait of her life, titled The Poor Little Rich Girl Saga. The films presented stylized glimpses of her daily routine: waking up and getting dressed in Poor Little Rich Girl; applying makeup and chatting in Face; meeting potential boyfriends in Beauty No. 1 and Beauty No. 2; dining with friends in Restaurant; and socializing at home in Afternoon. Many of her performances were loosely directed by Wein, who appeared as an off-screen voice. Sedgwick also starred in Kitchen, Outer and Inner Space, Prison, and Lupe. Warhol financed these films with money he made from his paintings. Most of these films were screened at small cinemas or private viewings held at the Factory, and they generated little profit.

=== Fashion and media attention ===
Sedgwick attracted growing media attention for her personal style and public appearances with Warhol. Her look—black leotards and tights, miniskirts, chandelier earrings, and heavy eye makeup—made her a fashion icon of the 1960s. She cropped her naturally brown hair short and dyed it blonde, at times matching Warhol's signature silver hair. Discussing her style in a 1965 interview with Women's Wear Daily, Sedgwick said: "I wear dance shirts and T shirts and tights because I'm spoiled. I always had fitted clothes, now that I've broken with my parents and they've cut off my money, I'd rather wear costumes than cheap clothes. I don't like Mod fashion … a bunch of vacant people dragging around in someone else's idea of what they should like. I don't keep up with fashion, I invent my own. I'd rather be original."

In its August 1, 1965 issue, Vogue magazine anointed Sedgwick a "Youthquaker," featuring a photograph by Enzo Sellerio that depicted her balancing atop a leather rhinoceros. Sedgwick's mother disapproved of her modeling career and hoped she would return to sculpting, which she had pursued before becoming a model. She also dismissed reports of Sedgwick's lavish fur collection as "utter nonsense."

In October 1965, Sedgwick and Warhol appeared as guests on The Merv Griffin Show. Warhol was shy and mostly silent, while Sedgwick spoke on his behalf and discussed his artistic genius. Their eccentric public image generated interest, and they were often seen together at parties, which helped publicize Warhol's underground films. Their growing cultural impact was underscored when Pop artist Roy Lichtenstein and his future wife Dorothy Herzka dressed as Warhol and Sedgwick for a Halloween party.

Sedgwick was photographed by Fred Eberstadt for the Life magazine's November 26, 1965 pictorial, "The Girl with the Black Tights." In January 1966, The New York Times described Sedgwick as a "real-life cartoon character created by Andy Warhol." She appeared in the March 15, 1966 edition of Vogue, modeling undergarments, and the next month, Women's Wear Daily named her one of New York's "fashion revolutionaries."

=== Final appearances and departure from the Factory ===
By 1966, Sedgwick had become disillusioned with her role at the Factory. She was reportedly frustrated by the lack of payment for her film work and resented the growing attention devoted to the Velvet Underground and Nico, newly managed by Warhol. On January 13, 1966, the Velvet Underground gave their first performance with Nico at the annual banquet of the New York Society of Clinical Psychiatrists at the Hotel Delmonico in New York City. Warhol's films were projected behind the band while Sedgwick and Gerard Malanga danced onstage. During the show, Sedgwick attempted to sing with the Velvet Underground. Warhol recalled, "He [Malanga] thought that she'd felt upstaged that night, that she'd realized Nico was the new girl in town. Nico and Edie were so different, there was no good reason to compare them, really. Nico was so cool, and Edie was so bubbly. But the sad thing was, Edie was taking a lot of heavy drugs, and she was getting vaguer and vaguer." She was further dissatisfied with her supporting role in the Andy Warhol, Up-Tight multimedia event in February 1966.

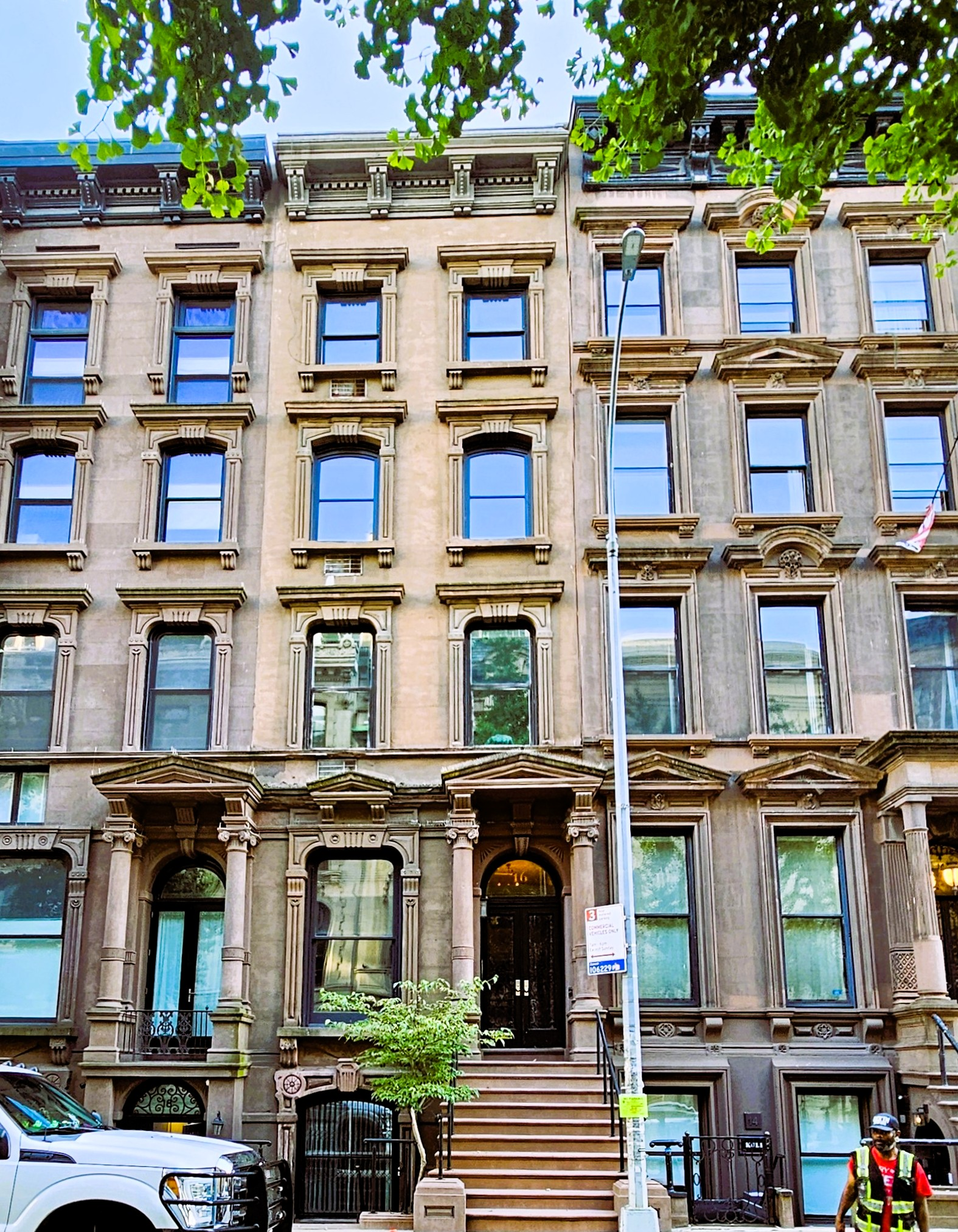
Sedgwick lived on the third floor at 16 East 63rd Street in Manhattan's Lenox Hill neighborhood. In 1966, a fire broke out in her apartment.

Soon after, Sedgwick left the Factory scene following an argument with Warhol at a restaurant. (Note: Paul Morrissey places the argument at the Gingerman. Gerard Malanga has written about an argument that took place at "a crowded table at Maxwell Plum (present were Andy, Paul Morrissey, Donald Lyons, Ingrid Superstar, Barbara Rubin, Nico, Chuck Wein, Lou Reed and John Cale).") Sedgwick had informed him that she signed a contract with Albert Grossman, who advised her to distance herself from Warhol due to bad publicity. According to Warhol, "Her Society lady attitude toward pills had changed to an addict attitude. Some of her good friends tried to help her, but she wouldn't listen to them. She said she wanted a 'career' and that she'd get one since Grossman was managing her. But how can you have a career when you don't have the discipline to work at anything?"

Sedgwick originally had a small role in Chelsea Girls, but she asked Warhol to remove her segment from the film. In May 1966, Warhol told the Los Angeles Times that "Edie was the best, the greatest. She never understood what I was doing to her. I don't know what's going to happen to her now."

In October 1966, Sedgwick survived a fire in her apartment after she reportedly overdosed and dropped a lit cigarette. Her friend Judy Feiffer visited her at Lenox Hill Hospital and said, "Edie claimed she was lighting candles when the drapes caught on fire." Sedgwick was desperate to leave the hospital and alleged that she had been mistreated by the nurses, fighting to secure her release after 24 hours. Following the incident, she moved to the Hotel Chelsea.

At the urging of René Ricard, Warhol cast Sedgwick in The Andy Warhol Story in November 1966. The film featured Ricard in a satirical portrayal of Warhol. It was never released commercially and was screened only once at the Factory.

== Association with Bob Dylan (1965–1966) ==
In 1965, Sedgwick met folk singer Bob Dylan and members of his entourage. Sedgwick and Warhol socialized with Dylan at New York nightclubs, including Ondine and Arthur. Sedgwick's relationship with Warhol's circle deteriorated in early 1966 as her attention shifted toward Dylan.

According to filmmaker Paul Morrissey, Dylan was calling Sedgwick and inviting her out, asking her not to tell Warhol or others that she was seeing him. Morrissey also said that Dylan encouraged her to sign with his manager, Albert Grossman, and wanted her as his "leading lady." After Warhol learned at his lawyer's office that Dylan had secretly married Sara Lownds, he informed Sedgwick. Morrissey recalled that she was shocked and began trembling: "We realized that she really thought of herself as entering … a relationship with Dylan that maybe he hadn't been very truthful. Probably none of it was true—Dylan never had any intention of making a movie with Edie, or starring her."

According to Warhol associate Gerard Malanga, Sedgwick and Dylan were not romantically involved: "That was a ruse. Dylan and his manager [Albert Grossman] were interested in her as a possible matchup for a film with Bob, but when they found out she was a bundle of no talent, they dumped her." In a 1985 interview with Spin, Dylan denied that he had a relationship with Sedgwick:

"I never had that much to do with Edie Sedgwick. I've seen where I have had, and read that I have had, but I don't remember Edie that well. I remember she was around, but I know other people who, as far as I know, might have been involved with Edie. ... I did know her, but I don't recall any type of relationship. If I did have one, I think I'd remember."

However, accounts from Dylan's associates suggest that he and Sedgwick had a personal connection. Jonathan Taplin recalled that Dylan admired Sedgwick and "respected her spirit and strength in being able to deal with him." Dylan's close friend Bob Neuwirth also recalled that Dylan had expressed interest in making a non-Warhol film with Sedgwick.

Sedgwick's older brother, Jonathan Sedgwick, claimed that she underwent an abortion and Dylan was the father. Allegedly, after Sedgwick was hospitalized for drug addiction the "staff found she was pregnant but, fearing the baby had been damaged by her drug use and anorexia, forced her to have the abortion." He added, "Her biggest joy was with Bob Dylan, and her saddest time was with Bob Dylan, losing the child. Edie was changed by that experience, very much so."

== Later career and personal struggles (1966–1971) ==
=== Mental health decline and career attempts ===
In 1966, Sedgwick became involved with folk singer Bob Neuwirth, who was Dylan's road manager. Neuwirth was the first filmmaker to work with Sedgwick after her break with Warhol. On Easter Sunday, he filmed a satirical short featuring Sedgwick parading up Fifth Avenue in a leopard-skin coat while leading her roller-skate-mounted rhinoceros-shaped footstool. The police jokingly gave the four-wheeled rhinoceros a parking ticket after she tied it to a fire hydrant. Throughout the year, Sedgwick became increasingly dependent on barbiturates. When she returned to California for the Christmas holidays, her parents put her in a psychiatric ward.

After her return to New York in 1967, Sedgwick attempted to establish a mainstream acting career. According to Neuwirth, "She didn't want to make any more fatuous films with Andy. But the establishment moguls didn't think she was capable of handling big parts. She was hot at one point and she hadn't capitalized on it." In March 1967, Sedgwick auditioned to replace Beverly Bentley in Norman Mailer's Off-Broadway adaptation of his novel The Deer Park, but was not cast. Mailer said, "She was very good in a sort of tortured and wholly sensitive way … She used so much of herself with every line that we knew she'd be immolated after three performances."

As British model Twiggy rose to international fame for her slim figure, short haircut, and dramatic eye makeup, Sedgwick attended a party in her honor in New York in March 1967. Women's Wear Daily quoted Sedgwick as saying, "Twiggy copied me two years ago," adding that she was "America's own original Paper Girl."

Sedgwick was cast by Chuck Wein in Ciao! Manhattan, an underground film he was directing. Filming began in April 1967 with only a loosely developed script, and the project gradually evolved into a semi-autobiographical portrait of Sedgwick's life. During filming, Sedgwick was taking a lot of speed, and she survived a second fire after a cigarette ignited her mattress in her room at the Hotel Chelsea, though her cat was killed in the blaze.

Around this time, she briefly returned to the Factory to make a film with Ondine. Ondine recalled, "I'd never seen Warhol walk away from his camera in a fit of just absolute, abject disgust but during that filming, a little movie of his called Edie and Ondine he just said, 'Stop, I won't film anymore.'" "Once Andy makes up his mind against you, you don't return in a Warhol film. But in this case he tried," Ondine said. He described the unreleased reel as such a "total collapse of a person" that viewers at the Factory found it painful to watch.

In August 1967, filmmaker Richard Leacock cast Sedgwick as Lulu in film sequences for a production of Alban Berg's opera Lulu being staged by Sarah Caldwell and the Boston Opera Company. Leacock said that Sedgwick arrived in London "absolutely desperate" and dependent on drugs, requiring constant attention during the production. He enlisted Neuwirth to accompany the crew, but the responsibility of caring for Sedgwick proved difficult, with Neuwirth stating that he could not act as her "nursemaid." After Neuwirth, Sedgwick dated singer Dino Valente and actor Patrick Tilden.

=== Hospitalizations and return to California ===
After completing work on Lulu, Sedgwick returned to New York and became increasingly distressed by her inability to speak with her ill father, Francis "Fuzzy" Sedgwick, who refused to accept her calls. Friends recalled that she expressed both deep love and resentment toward him. When he died of pancreatic cancer in October 1967, while Sedgwick was a patient at Gracie Square Hospital, those close to her hoped it would bring her peace. Instead, his death appeared to deepen her emotional struggles, and she continued to move in and out of hospitals in the following years.

According to Sedgwick, after running away from Gracie Square Hospital, she entered a destructive period of heavy drug use that culminated in an overdose of Placidyl and a coma. Authorities treated the incident as a suicide attempt and committed her to the New York State Psychiatric Institute at Columbia-Presbyterian Hospital before transferring her to Manhattan State Hospital on Wards Island. Although she and Warhol had become estranged, Sedgwick sent him a get-well card while he was recovering from a near-fatal shooting in June 1968. Later that year, her mother secured her release and brought her back to California. Shortly after her return, she was arrested on narcotics charges and sentenced to five years' probation. In August 1969, Sedgwick was admitted to Cottage Hospital in Santa Barbara, where she met fellow patient Michael Post, whom she later married.

While hospitalized in 1970, Sedgwick was contacted by Weisman about completing Ciao! Manhattan. With the approval of her psychiatrist, Dr. Mercer, she moved into an apartment near the hospital and resumed filming under the supervision of nurses, film producer John Palmer and his wife, Janet. During production, Sedgwick had her breasts enlarged through silicone injections, a change that the filmmakers addressed in the film's dialogue without explicitly acknowledging the procedure. Production progressed slowly but was eventually completed in early 1971 and released the following year.

=== Marriage to Michael Post ===
From January to June 1971, Sedgwick was hospitalized again and received shock therapy. Despite occasional arguments with Michael Post and concerns about her ongoing mental health struggles, the couple became engaged soon after her release. Post recalled, "I thought I could turn her into a person who could function in society without the use of drugs and alcohol, but I always had the feeling that once I did that, then I would lose her. I was so mad about her that I had to take the chance." After a brief engagement, they married on July 24, 1971, at her family's ranch in California.

Following the wedding, Sedgwick hoped to have a baby and underwent medical testing, but learned that she wasn't pregnant. She temporarily stopped drinking and using pills, and the couple spent much of August 1971 together in Santa Barbara, frequenting the beach and local nightclubs. In October, Sedgwick developed a severe ear infection and suffered an allergic reaction to the antibiotics prescribed to treat it, resulting in serum sickness and chronic pain; Post said this led to the return of her dependence on prescription drugs. As her health deteriorated, she spent increasing amounts of time bedridden while Post cared for her.

== Death ==
On the night of November 15, 1971, Sedgwick attended a fashion show at the Santa Barbara Museum that was filmed for the television series An American Family. After the show, she went to a party where she drank alcohol and then called her husband to pick her up. On the way home, Sedgwick told him she had met a man from New York and was uncertain about the future of their marriage. "I guess I knew she was going to leave me one day. I honestly felt that she was in love with me, but that I was beneath her," Post said. Once they got home, Post gave her medication, and she quickly fell asleep. Her breathing was "bad – it sounded like there was a big hole in her lungs," but he attributed it to her heavy smoking habit and went to sleep.

When Post awoke the following morning at 7:30 am, he found her unconscious in bed. Sedgwick was pronounced dead at 9:20 am on November 16, 1971; she was 28. The coroner ruled her death an undetermined "accident/suicide." Her death certificate states the immediate cause was "probable acute barbiturate intoxication" due to ethanol intoxication. Her alcohol level was registered at 0.17%, and her barbiturate level was 0.48 mg%.

News of Sedgwick's death was inexplicably withheld for a week before being released to news outlets. Post arranged a small funeral and chose to have her buried at Oak Hill Cemetery in Ballard, California. Her mother, Alice Sedgwick, was later buried next to her after she died in 1988.

== In popular culture ==
=== Books ===
In 1982, Edie Sedgwick: An American Biography written by Jean Stein was published by Alfred A Knopf.

In 2022, Sedgwick's sister Alice Sedgwick Wohl released the book As It Turns Out: Thinking About Edie and Andy.

=== Film and theater ===
Sedgwick's life has been the subject of numerous projects. In the 1980s, Warren Beatty acquired the rights to her life story and explored a film adaptation starring Molly Ringwald, but the project was never realized. Sedgwick has since appeared as a character or inspiration in several works. Jennifer Rubin portrayed her in Oliver Stone's The Doors (1991), while Amanda Peet's character in Igby Goes Down (2002) is described as an Edie Sedgwick-like. The 2004 Off-Broadway play Andy & Edie produced by Peter Braunstein dramatized her relationship with Warhol.

In George Hickenlooper's film Factory Girl (2006), a fictionalized account of her life, Sedgwick was played by Sienna Miller alongside Guy Pearce as Warhol. Michael Post, Sedgwick's widower, appears as a taxi driver in one of the last scenes of the film. Michelle Williams portrayed a Sedgwick-inspired character in I'm Not There (2007).

Later tributes include the short film Edie: Girl on Fire (2010) by Melissa Painter and David Weisman, and the animated short Too Late (2021) by Polish artist Kinga Syrek, released to mark the 50th anniversary of her death.

=== Music ===
Sedgwick has been widely cited as an influence and subject in popular music across multiple decades. Critics have long speculated that Bob Dylan drew inspiration from Sedgwick in several songs, most notably his 1965 single "Like a Rolling Stone," as well as "Just Like a Woman," and "Leopard-Skin Pill-Box Hat" from his 1966 album Blonde on Blonde. Although Dylan never publicly confirmed these associations, the speculation has persisted due to Sedgwick's proximity to Dylan during this period and the thematic parallels noted by commentators.

The Velvet Underground's "Femme Fatale," from the album The Velvet Underground & Nico (1967), was explicitly written about Sedgwick at Warhol's request. Throughout the 1980s and 1990s, Sedgwick's image and legacy continued to resonate in alternative and rock music. She appears on the cover of Dramarama's 1985 debut album Cinéma Vérité, while the band's video for "Anything, Anything (I'll Give You)" incorporates footage from Ciao! Manhattan. That same year, The Dream Academy released the single "The Love Parade" with the B-side "Girl in a Million (For Edie Sedgwick)." Sedgwick was referenced or memorialized in songs by Primal Scream ("Velocity Girl," 1986), Edie Brickell & New Bohemians ("Little Miss S.," 1988), James Ray and The Performance ("Edie Sedgwick," 1989), The Cult ("Edie (Ciao Baby)," 1989), and Deadbolt's "Edie" (1992).

Admiration for Sedgwick extended into the 21st century with additional tributes, including Ladytron with their song Beauty*2 on the Ladytron 'Witching Hour' LP (2005). Tal Cohen-Shalev's "Factory Girl (Song for Edie Sedgwick)" (2009). Alizée's album Une enfant du siècle (2010) was inspired by her life, and Dean & Britta's 13 Most Beautiful: Songs for Andy Warhol's Screen Tests (2010) includes a song written to accompany Warhol's screen test of Sedgwick. The Pretty Reckless' "Factory Girl" (2010) is also based on her, with lead singer Taylor Momsen citing Sedgwick's style and boundary-pushing persona as an inspiration. References to Sedgwick appear in Lady Gaga's music videos for "Applause" and "Marry the Night," while G-Eazy's 2014 song "Downtown Love" draws on her life story. Beach House cited Sedgwick's iconography as an influence on their 2018 album 7, particularly the track "Girl of the Year."

== Filmography ==
Film
Year	Title	Role	Notes
1965	Horse		Non-speaking role; first appearance in a Warhol film
1965	Vinyl		Non-speaking role
1965	Beauty No. 2		
1965	Space		
1965	Restaurant		Short
1965	Prison		alternative title: Girls in Prison
1965	Kitchen		
1965	Afternoon		
1965	Outer and Inner Space		Short
1965	Bitch		
1965	Screen Test No. 1	Herself	
1965	Screen Test No. 2	Herself	
1965	Poor Little Rich Girl	Poor Little Rich Girl	Credited as Mazda Isphahan
1965	Factory Diaries		
1966	Lupe	Lupe Vélez	
1966	Face		
1966	The Andy Warhol Story		
1967	Four Stars****		alternative title: The Four Star Movie; uses footage of Sedgwick from previous Warhol films
1969	Walden	Herself	alternative title: Diaries, Notes and Sketches
1972	Ciao! Manhattan	Susan Superstar	posthumously released
