= Flesh for Frankenstein =

1973 film by Paul Morrissey

- West German theatrical release poster
- Directed by: Paul Morrissey
- Written by: Paul Morrissey
- Based on: Frankenstein by Mary Shelley
- Produced by: Andrew Braunsberg; Carlo Ponti; Jean-Pierre Rassam
- Starring: Joe Dallesandro; Udo Kier; Monique van Vooren
- Cinematography: Luigi Kuveiller
- Edited by: Jed Johnson; Franca Silvi (Italian version)
- Music by: Claudio Gizzi
- Production company: Compagnia Cinematografica Champion
- Distributed by: Bryanston Pictures (United States); Gold Film (Italy)
- Release dates: November 30, 1973 (West Germany); April 2, 1974 (United States); March 15, 1975 (Italy)
- Running time: 95 minutes
- Country: Italy
- Language: English
- Budget: $300,000
- Box office: $7 million

Flesh for Frankenstein, also known as Andy Warhol's Frankenstein, is a 1973 horror film directed by Paul Morrissey. Presented by Andy Warhol, it stars Udo Kier, Joe Dallesandro, Monique van Vooren, and Arno Juerging. The film follows Baron Frankenstein, who attempts to create a new race by assembling human bodies for his experiments.

Filmed in 3-D, Frankenstein was shot back-to-back with Blood for Dracula (1974) in Italy, as part of Warhol and Morrissey's collaboration with Italian producer Carlo Ponti. It was a commercial success, grossing $7 million in the United States and Canada within 6 months of its theatrical release in 1974.

== Plot ==
Set in 19th-century Serbia, Baron von Frankenstein neglects his wife and sister Katrin while attempting to create a "perfect" man and woman from corpses, whom he intends to use to establish a new Serbian race that will obey his every command. The Baron is particularly concerned with the male creature's physical appearance and libido, repeatedly inspecting its nose to ensure it has the proper Serbian shape. Dissatisfied with the creature's lack of sexual desire, he seeks a more sexually driven head to replace its own.

The Baron and his assistant Otto encounter Nicholas, a sexually active farmhand leaving a brothel with his sexually repressed friend, who is preparing to enter a monastery. Assuming the friend is suitable donor, they kill him and transplant his head onto the male creature. Nicholas is later summoned to the castle by Katrin, where they form an agreement that he will gratify her unsatisfied carnal appetites.

The creatures are presented at dinner with the Baron's family, where the male creature fails to recognize Nicholas. Suspecting that something is wrong, Nicholas investigates by snooping around the laboratory. He discovers the Baron's experiments, but is captured before he can escape. The Baron considers using Nicholas's head as a replacement for the male creature, which remains sexually unresponsive. Katrin, meanwhile, is given the opportunity to have sex with the creature but is killed during a bout of overly vigorous lovemaking.

Meanwhile, Otto sexually exploits the female creature, causing her death through a violent disembowelment. The Baron kills Otto and then orders the male creature to kill Nicholas. Instead, the creature's memories of its former life return, and it turns against the Baron, killing him in a gruesome manner. The male creature, now believing that he is better off dead, disembowels itself. The Baron's children, Erik and Monica, enter the laboratory and capture Nicholas, raising him into the air with a crane as they prepare scalpels.

== Cast ==
- Joe Dallesandro as Nicholas the farmhand
- Udo Kier as Baron von Frankenstein
- Monique van Vooren as Baroness Katrin von Frankenstein, the Baron's wife/sister
- Arno Juerging as Otto, the Baron's assistant
- Dalila Di Lazzaro as the female monster
- Srdjan Zelenovic as Sacha/the male monster, Nicholas' friend
- Marco Liofredi as Erik von Frankenstein, the Baron's son
- Nicoletta Elmi as Monica von Frankenstein, the Baron's daughter
- Liù Bosisio as Olga the maid
- Cristina Gajoni as Nicholas' girlfriend

== Production ==
=== Pre-production ===
English producer Andrew Braunsberg, who was associated with Italian producer Carlo Ponti, wanted Andy Warhol's director Paul Morrissey to make a film in his New York style but "disorienting it by putting it in a different context." The original idea for Flesh for Frankenstein film came from director Roman Polanski who had met Morrissey when promoting his film What?. Morrissey recalled, "Polanski thought that I, for some reason, would be a natural person to make a 3-D film about Frankenstein. I thought it was the most absurd option I could imagine."

Warhol and Morrissey persuaded Ponti to finance the project, building on the European commercial success of their earlier collaborations, Flesh (1968), Trash (1970), and Heat (1972), as well as Warhol's reputation in the art world as the film's presenter. In 1973, Morrisey told The New York Times, "We don't want our pictures taken seriously even if they are played straight. Our Frankenstein movie is the old‐fashioned story of the doctor, the scientist, the monster; and it's got some violence in it. It's banal, but it's funny and kind of interesting."

Braunsberg arranged the financing by securing $700,000 from Ponti, Cinerama in Germany, and Jean-Pierre Rassam in France. Ponti initially agreed to finance Flesh for Frankenstein on a budget of $300,000, with Morrissey and Warhol receiving fees and a share of the profits, while Ponti retained distribution rights. When Ponti asked Morrissey how long the film would take to shoot, Morrissey estimated three weeks. Ponti suggested using the remaining time and resources to make a second film. Braunsberg proposed a Dracula film, resulting in the production of Blood for Dracula.

Factory members involved in the production included actor Joe Dallesandro, who was to star in both films; Warhol's boyfriend Jed Johnson, who had spent several months handling pre-production work; and Warhol's business manager Fred Hughes, who served as art director. Warhol's entourage stayed at Polanski's Villa Mandorli on the Via Appia Antica in Rome.

While living in Rome, German actor Udo Kier met Morrissey on a flight to Munich. After learning that Kier was an actor, Morrissey gave him his contact information and a few weeks later offered him the role of Baron von Frankenstein.

=== Production ===
Flesh for Frankenstein was filmed at Cinecittà in Rome with a crew of Italian filmmakers. The staff included Enrico Job as the production designer, pianist Claudio Gizzi for the score and special effects artist Carlo Rambaldi for the special effects. Johnson later recalled, "It was an up experience, but it was really different working with an Italian crew and mostly European actors, and I think it was hard for Paul doing two films back to back."

At first, Morrissey intended to rely on improvisation for the dialogue for his characters, but had to come up with a new method, as this would not work for some actors, such as Udo Kier. This led to Morrissey preparing the dialogue day-by-day, dictating it to Pat Hackett on the way to the studio. Filming began on March 20, 1973.

Warhol was not involved in the filming, but he visited the set during production and the editing period. When asked about how he contributed to the film, Warhol responded that "I go to the parties," following that up with "All of us at The Factory contribute ideas."

=== Post-production ===
Bryanston Pictures picked up the rights to both Flesh for Frankenstein and Blood for Dracula in the United States and Canada.

While some Italian prints credit second unit director Antonio Margheriti as director of the film under his pseudonym "Anthony M. Dawson", Udo Kier has stated that Margheriti had nothing to do with directing the film. Kier stated that he and the other cast members received direction only from Morrissey and noted that "Margheriti was on the set, he came to the studio from time to time, but he never directed the actors. Never!" Margheriti was credited as the director to ensure the film would obtain Italian nationality for the producers due to Italian laws. Tonino Guerra is credited as the screenwriter in the Italian prints as well, but his input is strictly limited to the Italian print of the film, as the only writer whose work on the film was ever evident was Morrissey himself. Margheriti did shoot some special effects scenes, including the scene involving "breathing lungs" made from pigs' lungs. Italian credits also have Franca Silvi as the editor as opposed to Jed Johnson.

== Release ==
The film premiered in West Germany on November 30, 1973, as Andy Warhol's Frankenstein.

In the United States, Flesh for Frankenstein received an X rating from the MPAA. It was screened on April 2, 1974, at Filmex, the Los Angeles International Film Exposition. The film opened commercially at Avco Cinema III in Los Angeles on May 8, 1974, followed by engagements at the Trans-Lux East and Trans-Lux West theaters in New York City on May 15.

In Canada, the film was banned in the province of Alberta. In British Columbia, it received a restricted adult classification, accompanied by a warning from provincial film censor Ray McDonald citing "many disgusting brutal scenes and some sex."

The film was submitted to Italian censors in January 1974 under the title Carne per Frankenstein, which was initially different from the American edit, containing some less explicit sex scenes and more violent death scenes. That version was initially banned in Italy, but an edited version was resubmitted under the title Il mostro è in tavola, barone...Frankenstein (lit. 'The monster is on the table, Baron...Frankenstein'), with changes to dialogue as well as the addition and removal of various scenes, giving it an 89-minute running time for distribution by Gold Film. The film opened in Italy in March 1975.

== Reception ==
=== Box office ===
Flesh for Frankenstein grossed $55,000 during its first week at the Trans-Lux East in Manhattan. In Boston, the film grossed $32,500 in its first week at the Beacon Hill Theater, leading the other X-rated and "straight films" playing in the market. At the Avco Cinema III in Los Angeles, it grossed $35,276 in its first week and $33,000 in its second.

By July 1974, after playing for two months in New York, Chicago, Los Angeles, Boston, and four other cities, the film had grossed $1,003,932. In November, Bryanston Pictures told the Los Angeles Times that the film had grossed $7 million in the United States and Canada.

In 1976, Variety reported that the film had earned $4.7 million in North American rentals.

=== Critical reception ===
==== Initial ====
Flesh for Frankenstein received mixed reviews, with critics emphasizing its grotesque violence, camp humor, and 3-D effects. Howard Kissel of Women's Wear Daily called the film "the ultimate 3-D movie, the ultimate stomach turner, but, oddly enough, surprisingly cognizant of the 19th Century sensibilities reflected in the original story." New York magazine highlighted that the "film has some very funny things going for it, and some clever switches on the old man-made monster theme." Norma McLain Stoop of After Dark wrote, "Morrissey's knowledge of and affection for the genre he gently spoofs, is what makes the film work."

Nora Sayre of The New York Times found that "in a muddy way, the movie attempts to instruct us about the universal insensitivity, living-deadness and the inability to be turned on by anything short of the grotesque. However, this 'Frankenstein' drags as much as it camps; despite a few amusing moments, it fails as a spoof, and the result is only a coy binge in degradation." Paul D. Zimmerman of Newsweek described the film as an "unsettling, sometimes unsteady blend of put-on and seriousness," citing Udo Kier's performance as Baron Frankenstein as an example. Zimmerman nevertheless called the film "a perversely fascinating movie" and "the first original variation on Frankenstein in years."

Charles Champlin of the Los Angeles Times found the film's use of 3-D uneven, saying that it often appeared as "two-dimensional planes one behind the other" rather than continuous depth. He noted that the effect worked more successfully during scenes featuring graphic gore. He also praised the ambition of the production and Enrico Job's art direction. Kevin Kelly of The Boston Globe described the film as a "disgusting, blood-spurting, entrail-streaming nightmare" but acknowledged its high production value as well.

Ann Guarino of the New York Daily News wrote that the "violence is more obscene than the sex, which has been spiced up with incest, nymphomania and necrophilia. All this in 3-D," and the audience is assaulted with "more entrails than are displayed in a butcher shop." Joseph Gelmis of Newsday similarly found the film intentionally excessive, writing "the movie is so awful it may strike you occasionally as funny. The 3-D effects are similar to those of the soft-core porno flick."

==== Retrospective ====
Craig Butler of AllMovie called the film "a ramshackle affair, with performances that are ludicrously over-the-top and direction that is even more so, and a script that is filled with horrible dialogue. Not to mention, it's a truly gross experience." He noted, however, that these qualities could appeal to viewers who appreciate its outrageousness or Morrissey's satire of the countercultural sexual revolution. Ian Jane of DVD Talk said, "Flesh for Frankenstein is a morbid and grotesque comedy that won't be to everyone's taste but that does deliver some interesting humor and horror in that oddball way that Morrissey has."

Bruce G. Hallenbeck commented in his book, Comedy-Horror Films: A Chronological History, 1914-2008, that the film is perverse and distasteful, but in a way which is deliberately parodical and even a political statement. He remarked, "The irony inherent in the screenplay by Morrissey and Tonino Guerra … gives the film a winking detachment, so that you find yourself convulsed with laughter during some of the goriest scenes ever filmed."

On the review aggregator website Rotten Tomatoes, 88% of 17 critics' reviews are positive.

In 2012, Time Out polled authors, directors, actors and critics who had worked in the horror genre on their top horror films, with Flesh for Frankenstein placing at number 98 on the top 100.

== See also ==
- List of films featuring Frankenstein's monster
- Andy Warhol filmography
- List of 3D films (1914–2004)
