= Queen of Peace Cemetery =

Cemetery in Old Westbury, New York

Coordinates: 40°46′21″N 73°34′48″W

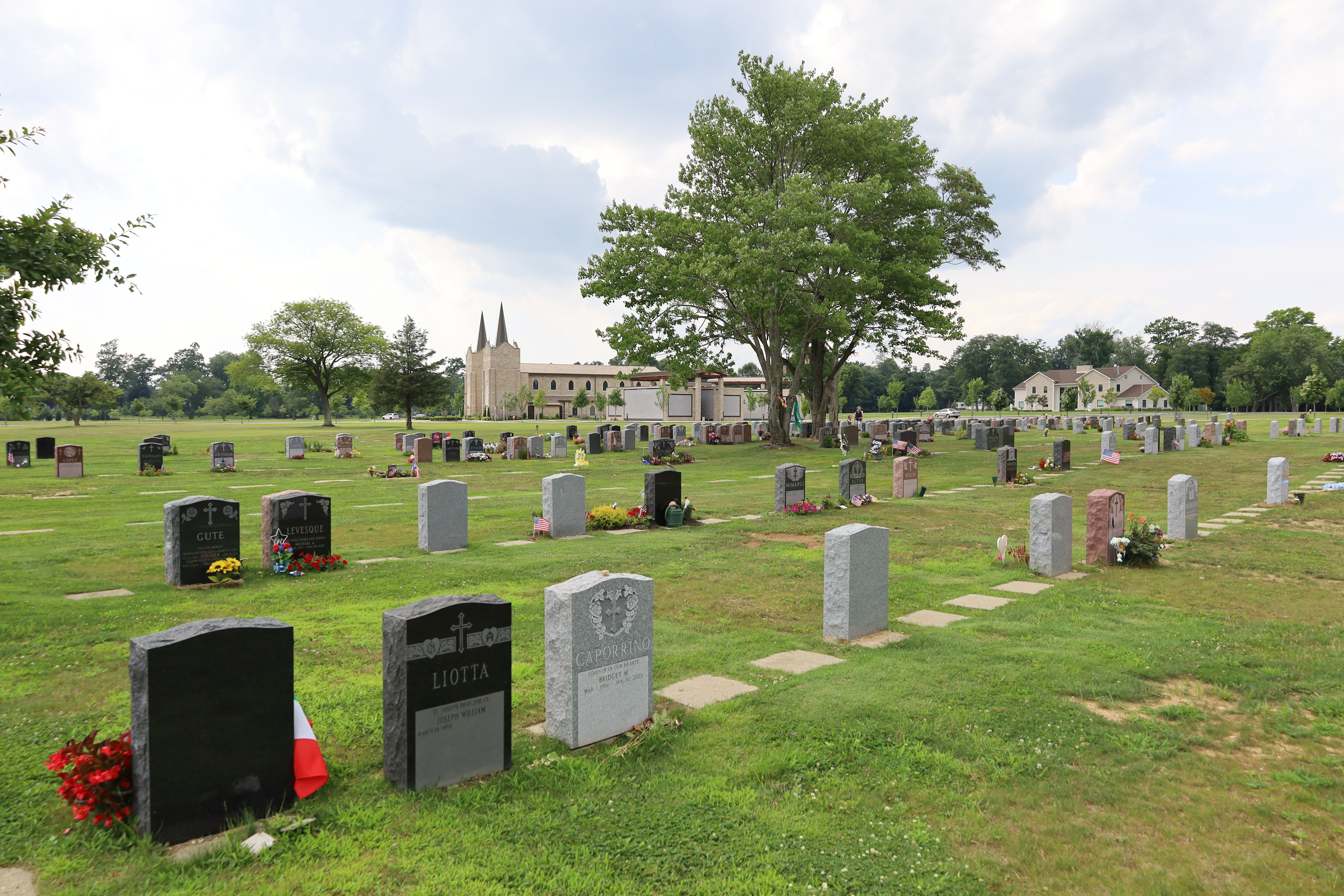
Section 1 of the cemetery in 2024, with the chapel and administration building in the background

Queen of Peace Cemetery is a cemetery of the Catholic Diocese of Rockville Centre in Old Westbury, New York. The land was previously a farm that had been owned for two centuries by the Titus family, and then by the Hitchcock polo family.

The land was purchased by the diocese in 1995 at auction from the federal government following seizure from a former owner; however, the Village of Old Westbury delayed construction for over two decades by litigation, which was settled in 2016. The cemetery was opened in 2020, earlier than expected and before the completion of construction, because the COVID-19 pandemic had caused nearby Cemetery of the Holy Rood to run out of space.

== History ==
=== Background ===
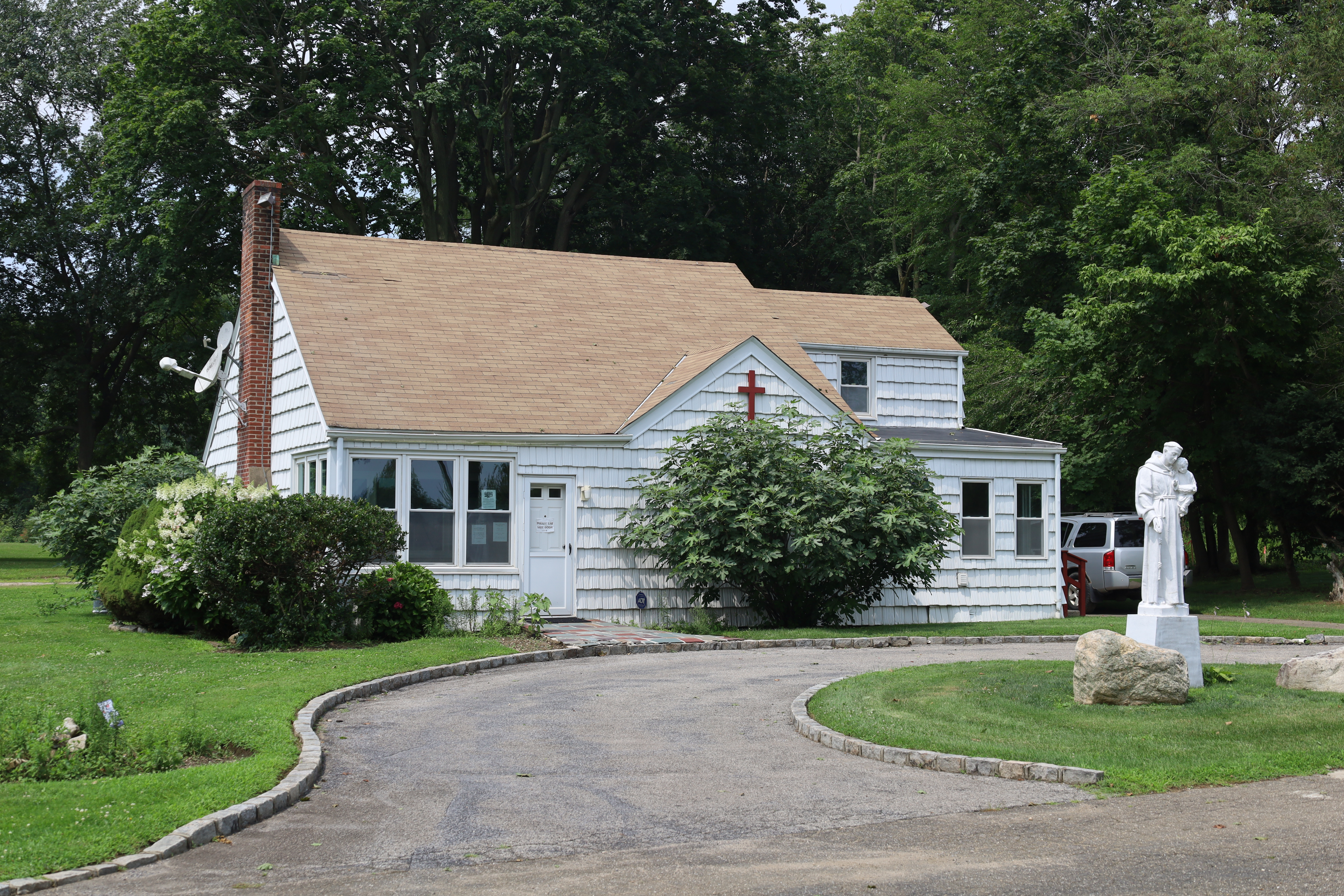
Historic guest house in use as the temporary administration building in 2021

The land was initially known as Broad Hollow Farm, a 30-acre (12 ha) grant made in 1664 to Edmond Titus, founder of Westbury, New York, and a son of Robert Titus. Its pond was used as a boundary marker. The estate remained in the Titus family for many generations. A farmhouse was built around 1725 by S. W. Titus, which was later noted for its "severe Quaker simplicity".

The estate was eventually purchased in 1890 by Thomas Hitchcock Sr. and occupied by his family, including his son Tommy Hitchcock Jr. The former had helped found the Meadowbrook Polo Club and pioneered the steeplechase, and was called "the Babe Ruth of American polo". Both father and son were 10-goal polo players. Alterations were made to the farmhouse around 1892 by Richard Morris Hunt. By 1913 the house had been reconstructed in an English style with additions to the original house preserving the historic feeling of the building. By this time the estate encompassed 97 acres, and contained a race track, steeplechase course, polo field, and other facilities.

The Hitchcock family sold the farm in the 1950s, and it passed through several owners. In 1980, the property, by then known as Old Westbury Farm, was sold to Dominick Imperio. He was suspected by the FBI of being an associate of the Colombo crime family, and in 1990 he was caught trying to sell the house to FBI agents posing as drug dealers, and offering to launder the money. The property was then seized by the federal government as part of a plea bargain. It was the most expensive property ever seized by the U.S. Marshals Service Eastern District. At the time, the property contained a 42-room 14,000 sq ft (1,300 m^{2}) mansion that was in a dilapidated state, a barn complex with 49 horse stalls, a five-door garage and a three-bedroom guest cottage.

=== Establishment ===
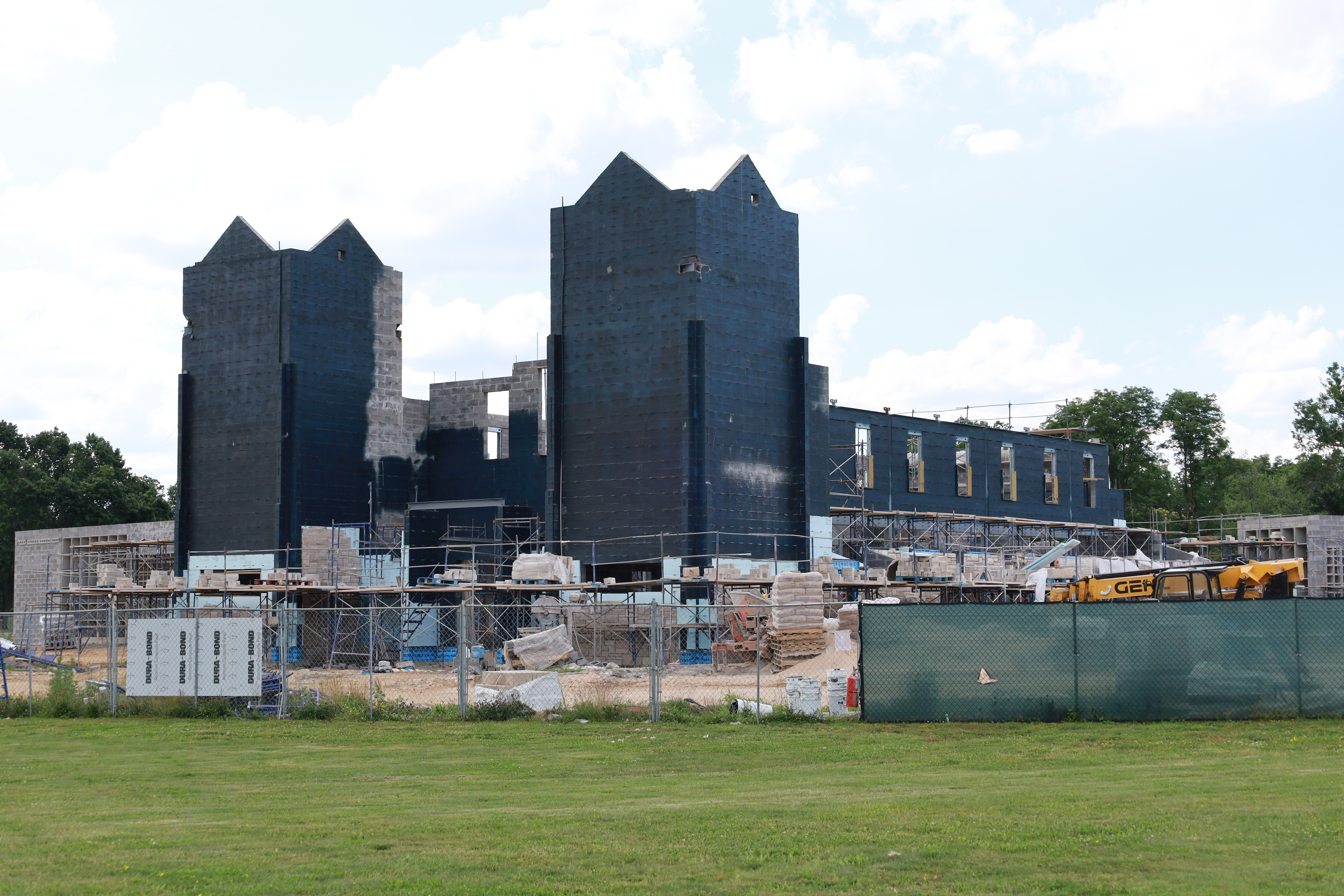
The chapel under construction in 2021

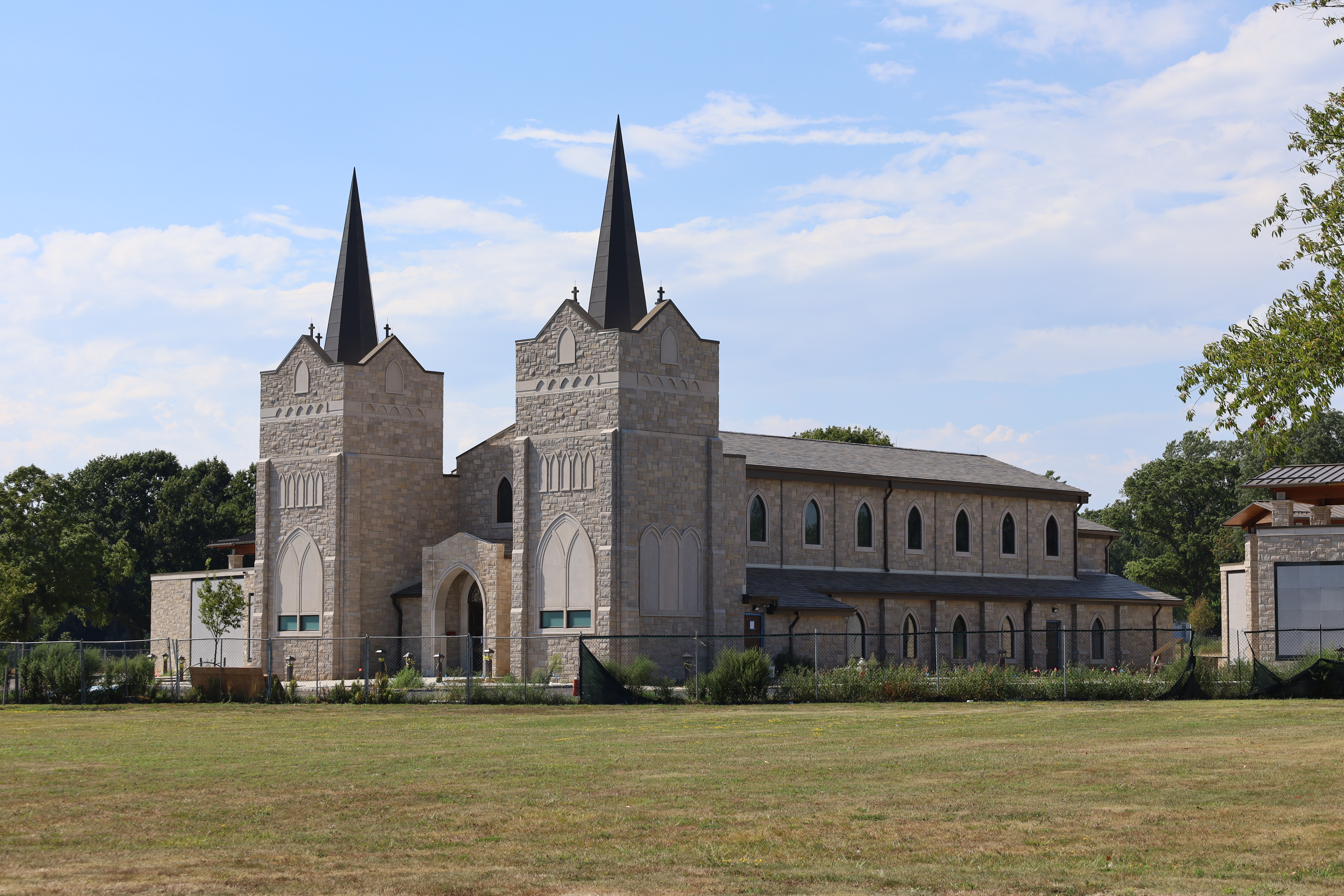
The chapel near completion in August 2022

The federal government auctioned the property in 1995. The Catholic Diocese of Rockville Centre won the auction, planning to convert the property into a cemetery, as its Cemetery of the Holy Rood, then the only major Catholic cemetery in Nassau County, was running out of space. It was initially planned that 70.5 acres (28.5 ha) would be used for the cemetery, while 26.75 acres (10.83 ha) on the northern end of the property would be used for a residential subdivision. In 2016, the residential subdivision was eliminated, with 87 acres (35 ha) allocated to the cemetery. The cemetery was planned to have up to 200,000 burial plots.

However, the cemetery's opening was delayed for over two decades by legal disputes with the Village of Old Westbury, which denied the necessary zoning change in 1995. The diocese sued the village in state court to compel the zoning change under religious land use protections, and received a favorable ruling in 2000 that was upheld on appeal in 2002. The diocese sued in federal court in 2009, alleging that the village was abusing its powers to delay and prevent the cemetery's development. The litigation was settled in 2016, with the village paying a $7.5 million settlement to the diocese. Construction had begun by 2018.

To mitigate concerns from nearby residents expressed about impacts on property values and traffic, the Diocese constructed six-foot berms at the property's edges and required processions to arrive only through the cemetery's Jericho Turnpike entrance. However, the plan was criticized by the Society for the Preservation of Long Island Antiquities for not retaining the historic structures and altering the site's rural setting.

The cemetery was opened early due to the COVID-19 pandemic, as the number of daily burials at the Cemetery of the Holy Rood was many times its normal rate, and its plots were exhausted. Elizabeth O'Sullivan became the first person buried there on May 14, 2020, four months before the groundbreaking on the cemetery's chapel and other buildings. The chapel was about half complete in December 2021 when the tops of the five-story steeples were installed, and it opened on November 5, 2023. Grave plots in Sections 3 and 4 became available by late 2024.

== Chapel ==
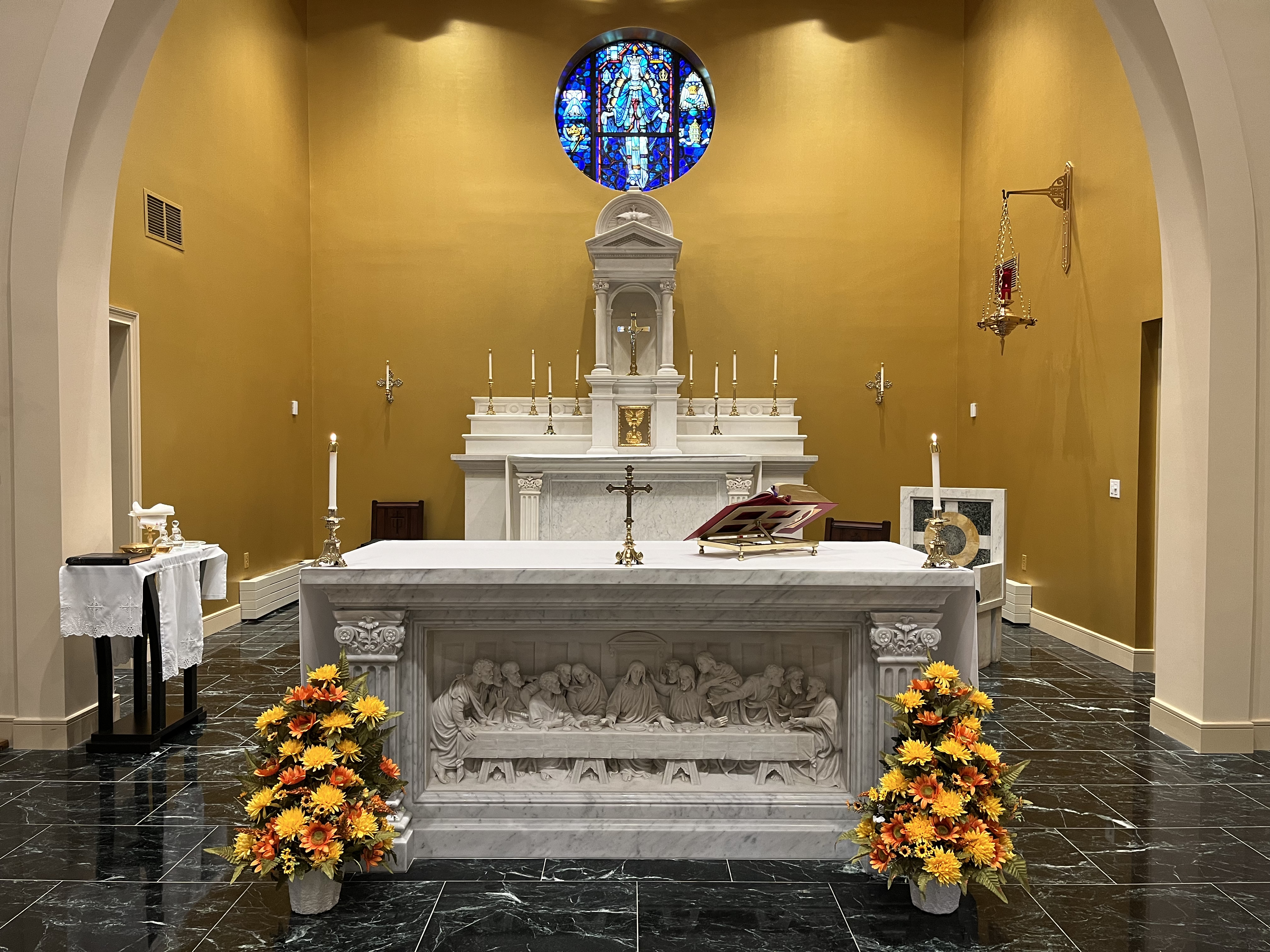
The chapel's altar set was transferred from Guardian Angel Chapel in Dyker Heights, Brooklyn.

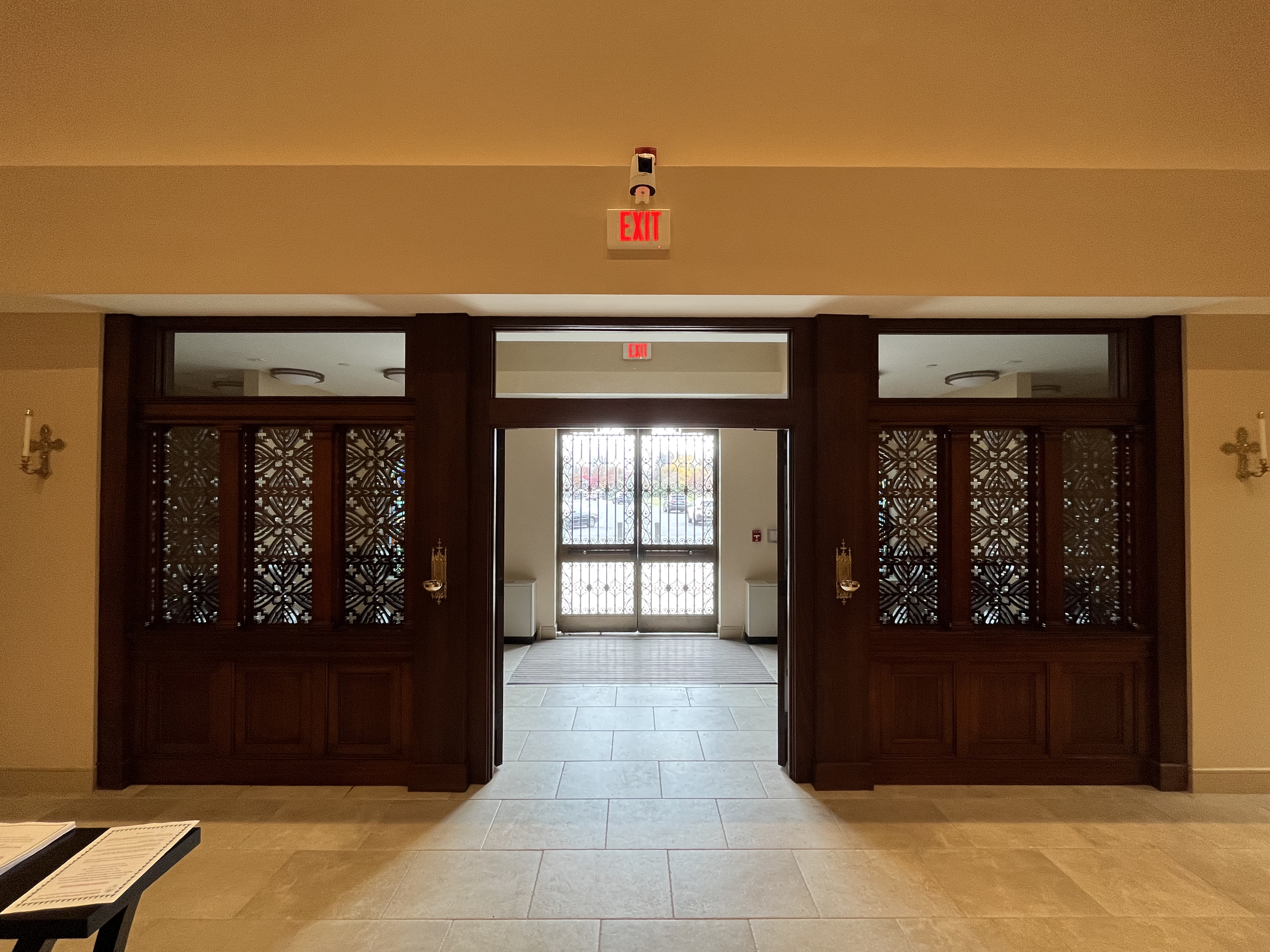
The chapel's wrought-iron filigree front doors and mahogany narthex screen were transferred from the Sisters of Christian Charity's convent in Mendham Township, New Jersey.

The chapel's architecture is modeled after the Sanctuary of Our Lady of Lourdes in France. It contains 32 Munich-style stained glass windows that were transferred from Sisters of Christian Charity's convent in Mendham Township, New Jersey, as they were not being used in its own new chapel. The windows were crafted in Germany in the 1958 as 13-foot-high rectangular pieces, with 20 depicting the life of Mary and 12 depicting saints. These were reconfigured into 6-foot-tall arched ones, and in one case a rose window, for the new chapel while preserving all elements of the iconography.

The chapel was also received wrought-iron filigree front doors and a carved mahogany narthex screen from the Sisters of Christian Charity, as well as an altar set from Guardian Angel Chapel in Dyker Heights, Brooklyn, and 120-year-old wooden pews from the former Church of the Epiphany in Williamsburg.

== Notable burials ==
- Joseph Mondello (1936–2022), U.S. Ambassador and Hempstead Town Supervisor
- Otto G. Obermaier (1936–2025), U.S. Attorney for the Southern District of New York
