= Joe Dallesandro =

American actor (born 1948)

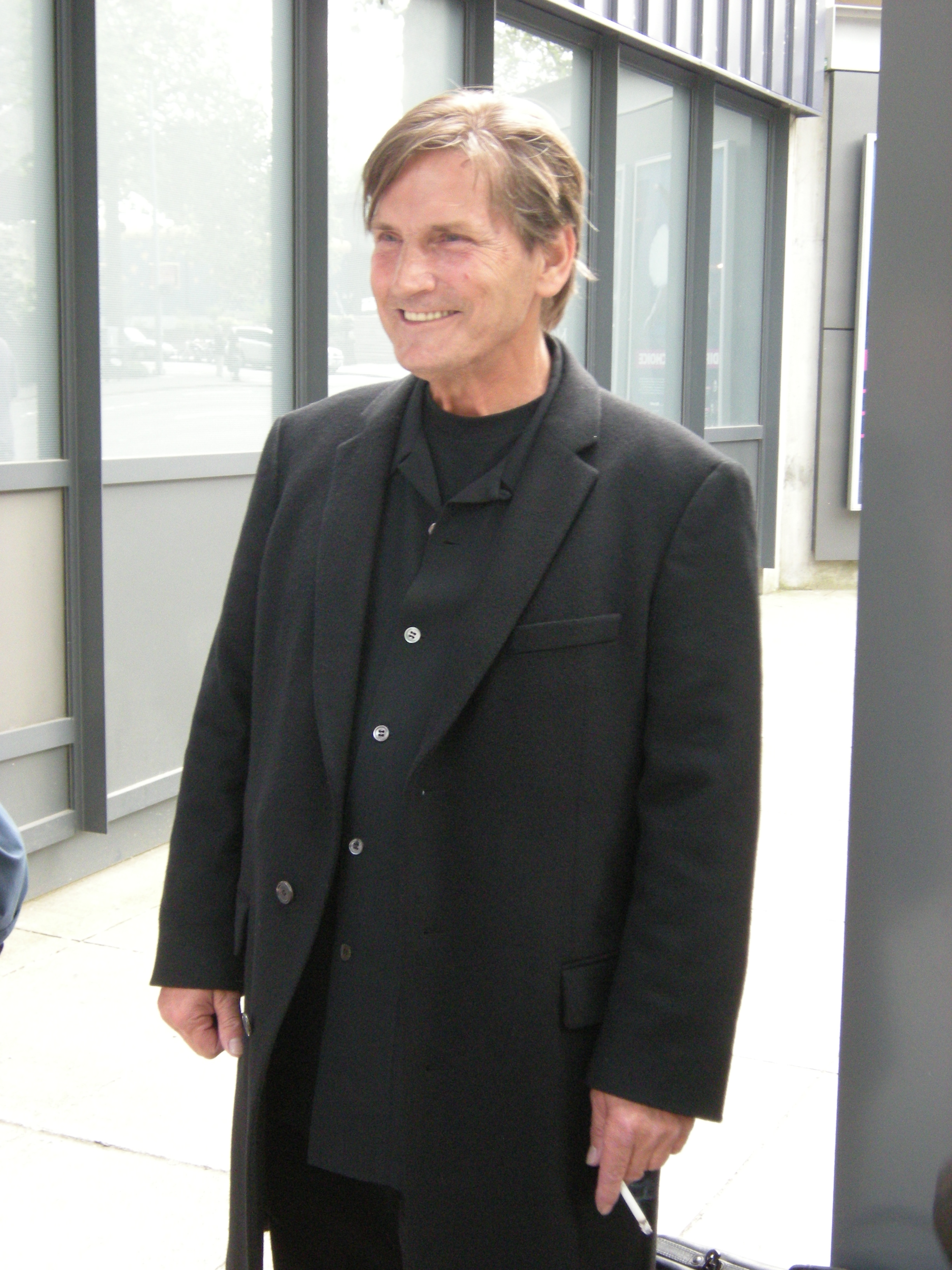
- Dallesandro in 2009
- Born: Joseph Angelo D'Allesandro III; December 31, 1948 (age 77); Pensacola, Florida, U.S.
- Other names: Joe Catano; Little Joe
- Occupations: Actor; model
- Years active: 1967–present
- Spouses: Leslie (m. 1967; div. 1969) Theresa (m. 1970; div. 1978) Kim Dallesandro (m. 1987)
- Children: 2

Joseph Angelo D'Allesandro III (born December 31, 1948) is an American actor and model. A sex symbol of gay subculture in the 1960s and 1970s, he is best known for starring in several underground films as a Warhol superstar.

Dallesandro began his career posing for homoerotic photographs before joining Andy Warhol's Factory and starring in Lonesome Cowboys (1968). His performance as a male prostitute in the film Flesh (1968), directed by Paul Morrissey, brought him fame. Rolling Stone magazine declared Dallesandro's subsequent lead in Trash (1970) as the "Best Film of the Year", making him a celebrity of youth culture and the sexual revolution.

Dallesandro proceeded to star in Heat (1972), Andy Warhol's Frankenstein (1973), and Andy Warhol's Dracula (1974). After appearing in European genre and art films for several years, he crossed into the mainstream as mobster Lucky Luciano in the 1984 film The Cotton Club. He had a career resurgence and continues to act occasionally. Dallesandro is a recipient of the 2009 honorary Teddy Award.

== Early life ==
Joseph Angelo D'Allesandro III was born on December 31, 1948, in Pensacola, Florida. His father, Joseph Sr., an 18-year-old Italian-American sailor in the U.S. Navy, married his mother, Thelma Testman, who was 14 years old. She was 16 when she gave birth to him. His surname was spelled "D'Allesandro" on his birth certificate, which was a recurrence of an error from his father's military documents. Following his rise to fame, his father's name was legally changed back to D'Alessandro.

His parents separated soon after they moved to New Jersey when he was two years old. His father maintained custody of him and his younger brother, Robert "Bobby" Dallesandro, but soon they ended up at Angel Guardian Home awaiting foster care. They were placed in the foster care of Mr. and Mrs. Gary Silano where Dallesandro attended Catholic school in Brooklyn until the family moved to North Babylon, New York. By the time he was five years old, his mother was serving five years in a U.S. federal penitentiary for interstate auto theft.

After she remarried, his mother, who went by Sandy Hoyt, and her husband unsuccessfully attempted to regain custody of Dallessandro and his brother. Dallesandro was initially content living with his foster parents, but as he became a teenager, he reportedly began to resent them, thinking that they were preventing him from living with his father. He became aggressive and repeatedly ran away from his foster home, until his father finally relented and allowed Joe to live with him.

At age 13, Dallesandro and his brother moved to Queens, New York, to live with their paternal grandparents and their father. "I was very rebellious," he recalled. "I hated the Queens school. They were so far behind the Long Island school that I just lost interest." He was expelled from school for punching the school principal. After this, he began hanging out with gangs and stealing cars.

At age 15, Dallesandro drove a stolen car through the Holland Tunnel without paying the toll. He was stopped by a police roadblock and was shot once in the leg by police, who mistakenly thought he was armed. Dallessandro managed to escape being caught by police, but was later arrested when his father took him to the hospital for his gunshot wound. In 1964, he was sentenced to Camp Cass Rehabilitation Center for Boys in the Catskills. In 1965, he ran away from the camp, and went to live with his father in Florida.

== Career ==
=== Early modeling career ===
In 1965, Dallessandro made his way to the West Coast with a friend and briefly worked at a pizza shop. When Dallesandro was looking for a job, someone recommended modeling. He was unaware that they meant nude modeling, but at the age of 16, he ended up supporting himself by modeling for Bob Mizer's Athletic Model Guild and Bruce Bellas (Bruce of Los Angeles). Mizer later stated that Dallesandro gave his age as 19 when he posed for him. In one sitting, Mizer took a short 8mm film and 86 photographs, some of which were published in Physique Pictorial's September 1967, January 1967, and July 1975 issues. The photos Bellas took were published in The Male Figure.

=== New York and the Factory years ===
By 1967, Dallessandro had returned to New York. He was married at the age of eighteen, and he was hustling around Times Square to pay for his drug habit. He also worked as a bookbinder.

Dallesandro and Louis Waldon in Flesh (1968)

He met Pop artist Andy Warhol and film director Paul Morrissey while they were shooting Four Stars (1967) in Manhattan's Greenwich Village. After accompanying a friend to observe the filming, he was cast in the project on the spot. His segment in Four Stars was later included in the film The Loves of Ondine (1968). Dallesandro began doing odd jobs at the Factory as Warhol's bodyguard and sometime actor.

Dallesandro starred in Lonesome Cowboys (1968), which was filmed in Arizona and then filmed San Diego Surf (2012) in California. While Warhol was recuperating from an assassination attempt in the summer of 1968, Dallesandro filmed Flesh (1968), a story of a male hustler—based on Dallesandro's experience—where he had several nude scenes. Appealing to male and female audience members, Dallesandro was the "first overtly sexualized male in the movies." Flesh, directed by Morrissey, became a crossover hit with mainstream audiences, and Dallesandro became the most popular of the Warhol stars. Warhol would later comment, "In my movies, everyone's in love with Joe Dallesandro."

In 1969, Dallesandro was cast in the MGM film The Magic Garden of Stanley Sweetheart (1970). Warhol was reportedly planning his commercial film debut in the production, alongside his superstars Ultra Violet and Gerard Malanga, with Dallesandro cast as Stanley's friend. However, Dallesandro was dismissed on the first day of filming. Ultimately, no other members of the Factory appeared in the film, except for Candy Darling in a brief scene.

The Warhol and Morrissey films did not usually have a script, so the actors improvised while the cameras were rolling. In 1970, Dallesandro told After Dark: "Sometimes they yell at me and say, 'Joe, you're really messing it up. Stop trying to act,' and then I usually do a good job. But if you watch carefully you'll see that my best performing comes when I have my clothes off. When I'm dressed, I really don't give very good performances, but when I am not, I really do a great job."

By 1970, Dallesandro earned a salary of $124 a week. After starring in Trash (1970), his underground fame began to cross over into the popular culture and he was viewed as a sex symbol. New York Times film critic Vincent Canby wrote of him: "His physique is so magnificently shaped that men as well as women become disconnected at the sight of him." Newsday film critic Jerry Parker wrote that "Joe Dallesandro, who is a mere 21 is to Andy Warhol what Clark Gable once was to Louis B. Mayer." Dallesandro and his son appeared on the cover of the April 1971 issue of Rolling Stone. He was also photographed by some of the top celebrity photographers of the time: Francesco Scavullo, Annie Leibovitz, Richard Avedon.

According to Dallesandro, Francis Ford Coppola wanted him to screen test for the role of Michael Corleone in The Godfather (1972), however, the offer fell through. Dallesandro believed that Warhol and Morrissey deterred Coppola's entourage by telling them that Dallesandro was a drug addict and couldn't handle the script, but Morrissey stated that isn't true. Morrissey added that he and Warhol would have been thrilled if Dallesandro landed a role in a major film.

Dallesandro also starred in the Warhol-produced film Heat (1972) with Sylvia Miles and Pat Ast. The following year, he starred in Andy Warhol's Frankenstein (1973) and Andy Warhol's Dracula (1974) with Udo Kier. Morrissey and Dallesandro, were increasingly at odds over financial matters during the production of the Frankenstein and Dracula films in Rome. Morrissey recommended that Dallesandro get an agent to find more work in Europe.

=== European exploitation films and decline ===
Dallesandro remained in Europe and capitalized on his reputation as a cult figure in a series of exploitation films in France and Italy. He appeared in Serge Gainsbourg's Je t'aime moi non-plus (1976), which starred Gainsbourg's girlfriend, British actress Jane Birkin.

Dalessandro's career collapsed in the late 1970s as a result of his dependency on alcohol and drugs. After his return to the U.S. in 1979, he resided in a trailer park close to Seattle with his estranged mother and indulged in excessive drinking. He relocated to Los Angeles in 1981, checked himself into a detox center, joined Alcoholics Anonymous, and worked as a limousine and taxi driver before returning to acting.

=== Mainstream career ===
Dallesandro made several mainstream films during the 1980s and 1990s. One of his first notable roles was that of 1920s gangster Lucky Luciano in Francis Coppola's The Cotton Club (1984). Working with manager/attorney Stann Findelle, his career enjoyed a resurgence. He had roles in the films Critical Condition (1987) opposite Richard Pryor, Sunset (1988) with Bruce Willis and James Garner, Cry-Baby (1990) with Johnny Depp, Guncrazy (1992) with Drew Barrymore, and Steven Soderbergh's 1999 film The Limey.

Dallesandro also appeared in several television shows. In 1986, he co-starred in the ABC drama series Fortune Dane. The series lasted only five episodes. He was also a regular for the first season (1987-1988) of the CBS crime drama series Wiseguy, and he appeared in three episodes of NBC's Miami Vice, and a two-hour episode of ABC's Matlock in 1990.

In 1995, Dallesandro appeared in a Calvin Klein ad campaign with model Kate Moss.

A biography, Little Joe: Superstar by Michael Ferguson was published in 1998, and a filmed documentary, Little Joe (2009), was released with Dallesandro serving as writer and producer. His adopted daughter, Vedra Mehagian, also served as a producer of the film.

Semi-retired from acting as of 2009, Dallesandro managed a residential hotel building in Los Angeles.

He appeared in the Dandy Warhols' official video for "You Are Killing Me" in 2016.

In 2018, he starred as himself in Ulli Lommel's Factory Cowboys: Working with Warhol. The film was based on Lommel's own biography and partly on Dallesandro's memories of the period during which he worked with Andy Warhol.

== Personal life ==
=== Sexuality ===
Although Dallesandro primarily had romantic relationships with women, he identifies as bisexual. He explained, "I consider myself bisexual. It wasn't that I was sexually attracted to men per se, but you know, if you do something for a while you can acquire a taste for it." Reflecting on his early experiences, he said his introduction to the gay world "saved me from life in prison for murder… It gave me a whole other attitude, a calmer attitude" and taught him "never to be homophobic, even before there was such a term." He cited musicians David Bowie and Mick Jagger as heroes, noting, "a man could say he liked both, that he appreciated both the look of a man and the look of a woman without being stereotyped."

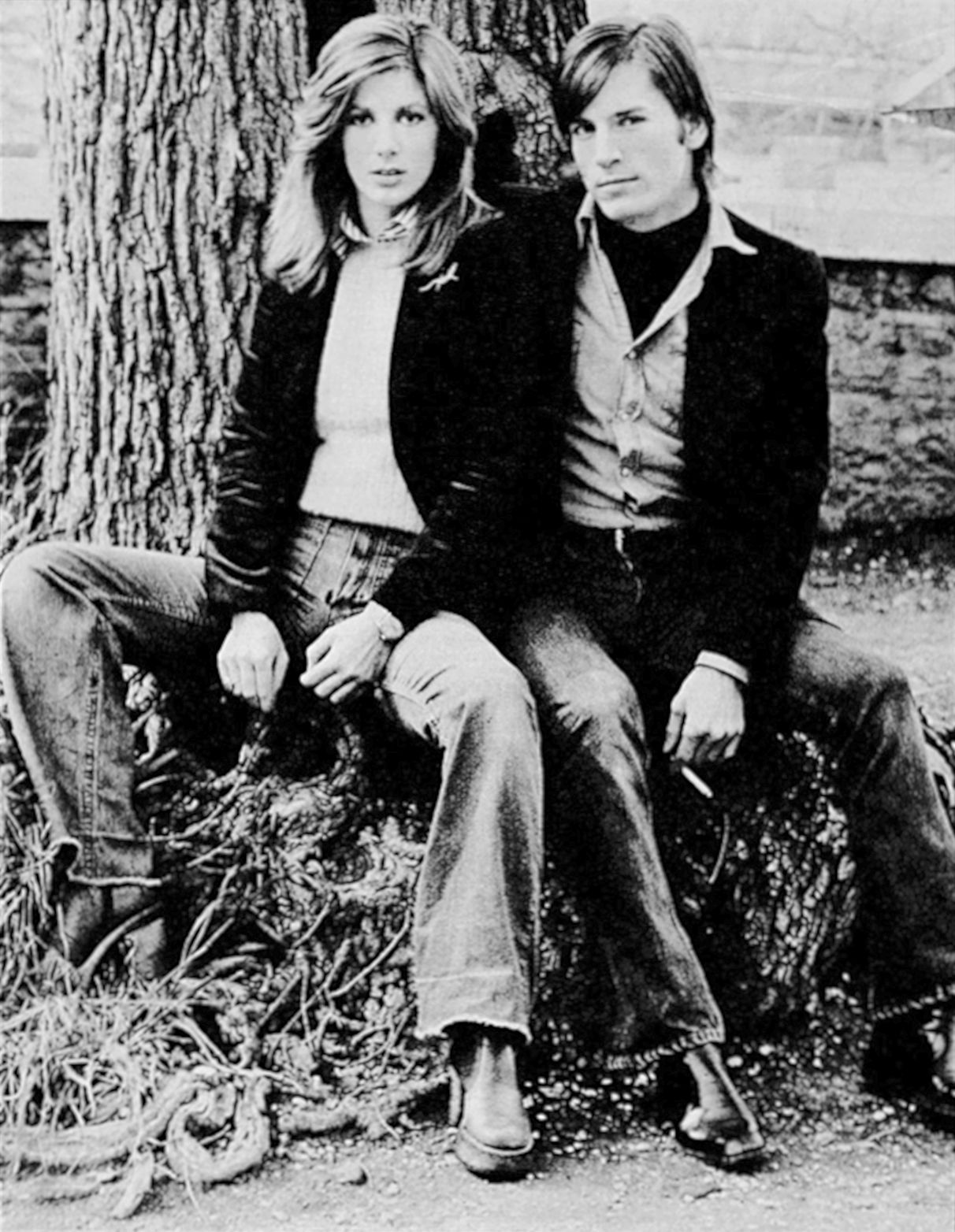
Dallesandro with his girlfriend Stefania Casini in Rome, 1974

=== Family and relationships ===
Dallesandro's younger brother Robert "Bobby" Dallesandro died in 1977. He had worked for Warhol as a chauffeur, and also appeared in the films Flesh (1968) and Trash (1970).

After being separated since childhood, at the age of 21, Dallesandro was reunited with his mother Sandy Hoyt in 1970. That summer, she learned through a phone call from Pensacola that he had located the family via the chamber of commerce and left contact information. Later that October, Dallesandro and his brother visited her in Sacramento.

Dallesandro has been married three times, and has two children. In 1967, at age 18, he married his first wife, Leslie, the daughter of his father's girlfriend. Their son, Michael, was born on December 19, 1968. The marriage was dissolved in 1969.

He met his second wife Theresa ("Terry") in the East Village, and they married in 1970. Their son, Joseph A. Dallesandro, Jr., was born November 14, 1970. They divorced in 1978.

While in Europe, Dallesandro was romantically involved with Italian actress Stefania Casini in the mid-1970s. She appeared as his love interest in film Blood for Dracula (1974).

In 1987, Dallesandro was married a third time, to Kimberly ("Kim"). Dallesandro has a grandson and a granddaughter by his son Michael, and a grandson by his son Joseph.

== Awards ==
In February 2009, Dallesandro received a special Teddy Award at the 59th Berlin International Film Festival, an honor recognizing those filmmakers and artists who have contributed to the further acceptance of LGBT people, culture, and artistic vision.

== In popular culture ==
- In Lou Reed's song, "Walk on the Wild Side", about the characters Reed knew from Warhol's studio, The Factory, the verse about Dallesandro used his nickname, Little Joe.
- Dallesandro claimed to be the model for the Andy Warhol photograph of a man's crotch on the Grammy-nominated cover of the Rolling Stones album Sticky Fingers (1971). He explained to biographer Michael Ferguson, "It was just out of a collection of junk photos that Andy pulled from. He didn't pull it out for the design or anything, it was just the first one he got that he felt was the right shape to fit what he wanted to use for the fly." The first editions of the album featured a functional metal zipper fly integrated into the photo. However, Craig Braun, who designed the cover with Warhol, disputes Dallesandro's claim, and makeup artist Corey Tippin suggested he was the model. The cover is generally believed to feature Warhol's lover Jed Johnson.
- The 1980s British band The Smiths used a still photograph of Dallesandro from the film Flesh as the cover of their eponymous debut album.
- Norwegian pop band Briskeby had a 2005 single called "Joe Dallesandro."

== Partial filmography ==
=== Film ===
Year	Title	Role	Notes
1967	Four Stars	College Wrestler	Alternative title: The 24 Hour Movie
1968	San Diego Surf	Joe	
1968	The Loves of Ondine	College Wrestler	Segment from Four Stars
1968	Flesh	Joe, The Hustler	Alternative title: Andy Warhol's Flesh
1968	Lonesome Cowboys	Joe "Little Joe"	Alternative title: Ramona and Julian
1970	Trash	Joe Smith	Alternative title: Andy Warhol's Trash
1972	Heat	Joey Davis	
1973	Andy Warhol's Frankenstein	Nicholas	Alternative title: Flesh for Frankenstein
1974	Blood for Dracula	Mario Balato	Alternative title: Andy Warhol's Dracula
1974	The Gardener	Carl	Alternative titles: Garden of Death, Seeds of Evil
1975	The Climber	Aldo	Alternative title: L'ambizioso
1975	Black Moon	Brother Lily	
1975	Savage Three	Ovidio Mainardi	Alternative title: Fango bollente
1975	Season for Assassins	Pierro Giaranaldi	Alternative title: Il tempo degli assassini
1976	Je t'aime moi non-plus	Krassky	Alternative title: I Love You, I Don't or I Love You ... Neither Do I
1976	The Margin	Sigismond	Alternative title: The Streetwalker
1976	Born Winner	Pericle	Alternative title: L'ultima volta
1977	A Simple Heart	Théodore	Alternative title: Un cuore semplice
1978	Safari Rally	Joe Massi	Alternative title: 6000 km di paura
1978	Killer Nun	Dr. Patrick Roland	Alternative titles: Suor Omicidi; Deadly Habits
1980	Madness	Joe Brezzi	Alternative title: Vacanze per un massacro
1981	Merry-Go-Round	Ben	
1982	Queen Lear	Joseph Kunz	
1984	The Cotton Club	Charlie "Lucky" Luciano	
1987	Critical Condition	Stucky	
1988	Sunset	"Dutch" Kieffer	
1988	Double Revenge	Joe Halsey	
1990	Almost an Angel	Bank Hood Leader	
1990	Cry-Baby	Mr. Hackett	
1991	Inside Out	Richard	Segment: "The Diaries"
1991	Wild Orchid II: Two Shades of Blue	Jules	
1992	Guncrazy	Rooney	
1992	Love Is Like That	The Boss	
1994	Sugar Hill	Tony Adamo	
1995	Theodore Rex	Rogan	
1998	L.A. Without a Map	Michael	
1999	The Limey	"Uncle John"	Credited as 'Joe Dallessandro'
2000	Beefcake	Cameos, old footage	
2002	Pacino Is Missing	Sal Colletti	
2008	3 Stories About Evil	Jean Maries	Short film
2022	Babylon	Charlie the Photographer	
2023	24 Hour Sunset	Himself	Documentary

=== Television ===
Year	Title	Role	Notes
1984	Miami Vice	Vinnie DeMarco	Episode: "One Eyed Jack"
1986	Fortune Dane	Tommy "Perfect Tommy" Nicautri	5 episodes
1987	Miami Vice	Alfredo Giulinni	Episode: "Down for the Count: Part 2"
1987	Wiseguy	Paul "Pat the Cat" Patrice	5 episodes
1988	The Hitchhiker	Gerard	Episode: "Fashion Exchange"
1989	The Hollywood Detective	Eddie Northcott	Television movie
1990	Matlock	Bobby Boyd	2 episodes

== Bibliography ==
- Ferguson, Michael; Dallesandro, Joe (1998). Little Joe, Superstar: The Films of Joe Dallesandro. Companion Press. ISBN 978-1-8891-3809-1.
- Watson, Steven (2003). Factory Made: Warhol and the Sixties. Pantheon Books. ISBN 978-0-6794-2372-0.
