= Geri Miller =

American dancer and actor

- Miller by Andy Warhol in 1972
- Born: Geraldine Miller; April 27, 1942 (age 84); Clifton, New Jersey, U.S.
- Occupations: Dancer; singer; actress

Geraldine "Geri" Miller (born April 27, 1942) is an American former dancer, singer, and actress. She was active in New York City's nightlife scene during the 1960s and 1970s. Miller began her career as a dancer at the Peppermint Lounge and recorded with the dance trio the Peppermints. She later became a stripper at New York clubs, while also appearing in sexploitation films. Miller became associated with Pop artist Andy Warhol's Factory circle and appeared in several Warhol-associated underground films, including Flesh (1968), Trash (1970), and Women in Revolt (1971). She also starred as Josie in Warhol's play Pork (1971). Miller described herself as a "super-groupie" and was romantically linked to numerous prominent musicians.

== Early life and education ==
Geraldine Miller was born to Mr. and Mrs. Morris Miller in Clifton, New Jersey, on April 27, 1942. After graduating from Clifton High School in 1960, she attended Berkeley College in New Jersey.

== Career ==
=== Early dancing career ===
While attending Berkeley College, Miller worked as a model and dancer before joining the chorus line at the Peppermint Lounge in New York City. The nightclub was a popular celebrity venue, where Miller met musicians who frequented the club.

Miller made her film debut as a go-go dancer in Fail Safe (1964). In 1965, she became the lead singer of the Peppermints, a trio of dancers, while continuing to perform at the Peppermint Lounge. Their single "We All Warned You" / "Peppermint Jerk" was released on RSVP Records and received a four-star rating from Billboard. Miller later stated that she was fired the Peppermint Lounge after singer James Brown, with whom she was romantically involved, sent her a telegram at the club.

In September 1966, she competed for the "Miss Night Beat" title aboard a gambling cruise. After learning that journalist Earl Wilson was one of the judges, Miller visited his office and gave him a photograph of herself in a revealing outfit; Wilson later described the encounter in his syndicated column, It Happened Last Night.

Miller worked as a stripper at venues including the M & M Lounge in Greenwich Village and the Metropole in Midtown Manhattan. The change in environment was difficult for Miller, and she began using more stimulants for confidence and engaging in more casual sexual relationships. She was a self-proclaimed "super-groupie" for her pursuit of prominent rock stars.

=== Emergence as a Warhol superstar and film career ===
In 1968, Miller became part of Pop artist Andy Warhol's Factory circle, appearing in the underground film Flesh (1968). Film critic A. H. Weiler of The New York Times described her performance in Flesh as that of a "naively funny topless dancer."

In 1968, Miller began appearing in several sexploitation films, including The Wall of Flesh, Sex by Advertisement, and Daughters of Lesbos. Feeling insecure about her body, she underwent nonsurgical breast augmentation through silicone injections.

Miller appeared in Brass Bed, an unreleased film shot in a Manhattan apartment in October 1968. Running approximately 66 minutes, the film also features Candy Darling, Viva, Ultra Violet, Ann Wehrer, and Vera Cruz. According to curator Callie Angell's notes, the participants improvised conversations about relationships, celebrity, and their personal lives. The film remains unfinished and has never been publicly screened.

Miller appeared in Meeting on 69th Street (1969) and Monique, My Love (1969). In 1969, she appeared with Muhammad Ali in the ill-fated Broadway production Buck White. She subsequently had small roles in The Magic Garden of Stanley Sweetheart (1970) and Pound (1970). She appeared as a go-go dancer in Trash (1970), where she performed fellatio on Joe Dallesandro and sang "Mama Look at Me Now."

In 1971, Miller appeared in The Telephone Book and Women in Revolt. She also starred as Josie in Warhol's play Pork, which was controversial for its nudity and simulated sexual acts. The production ran for two weeks at La MaMa Experimental Theatre Club in New York City in May 1971 before transferring to the Roundhouse in London for a six-week run beginning in August. Miller attracted attention in London when she was arrested after exposing her breasts during a photo session outside Clarence House, the residence of the Queen Mother. She was released after pleading guilty to insulting behavior.

Miller continued performing at New York clubs, including the Metropole and Carnival. Ernest Leogrande of the Daily News described Miller as the "prototype of topless dancers." Unlike many other dancers, Miller did not wear platform shoes, saying they were "klutzy," and adding, "I really dance. I don't just move around." Miller took particular pride in her ability to swing the tassels on her breasts in different directions simultaneously. In February 1972, she appeared in Harper's Bazaar wearing custom-made tassels by costumier Jack Benson. That year, photographer Francesco Scavullo also photographed her nude wearing the tassels.

Miller was known for her public antics and revealing clothing. In July 1972, she emerged topless from a giant birthday cake at musician Mick Jagger's birthday party at the St. Regis New York. The following month, she attracted attention at the New York premiere of And Now for Something Completely Different, wearing a large flowered hat and a revealing pinafore. In October, she attended musician David Bowie's concert at Carnegie Hall with Warhol and ran up to the stage with a bouquet of flowers.

In August 1973, appeared at the Beacon Theatre in An Evening with the Flasher, an X-rated variety show, performing "Angel Baby." She also occasionally worked as a barmaid at Max's Kansas City and CBGB.

=== Later years ===
In the 1970s, Miller left the entertainment industry and took a full-time position at the law firm Shearman & Sterling. She worked on legal matters that included the will of Winthrop Rockefeller. According to Miller, she later disclosed her back story—"all of it, from Warhol, Jagger, and James Brown, to stripping, sex movies, and Super Groupie sex"—to a paralegal and subsequently lost her position. A firm partner gave her a letter of recommendation.

Miller later worked as an assistant to New York real-estate broker and socialite Alice Mason, who encouraged her to obtain a real-estate license. Their professional relationship ended after Miller rejected a sexual advance from Mason. In the years that followed, Miller found it difficult to maintain regular employment.

== Personal life ==
In October 1962, Miller met singer James Brown at the Peppermint Lounge. He invited her to his show with The Famous Flames at the Apollo Theater in Harlem the night he recorded the live album Live at the Apollo (1963). Miller and Brown continued an on-and-off relationship for several years. Due to discrimination against interracial couples and because Brown criticized Black musicians who were involved with White women, they kept their affair hidden. Miller recalled that she turned down Brown's marriage proposal: "I said no, even though I loved him. … I was taking uppers all the time because I needed to keep up with… life. I was sad to turn him down, but I didn't want him to find out."

In February 1964, Miller had a brief affair with drummer Ringo Starr when The Beatles first toured America. By June 1965, she had reportedly dated guitarist Lenny Davidson of The Dave Clark Five, drummer Dennis Wilson of The Beach Boys, and Gordon Waller of Peter and Gordon, who surprised her with a painting.

In the mid-1960s, Miller dated Dino Danelli, drummer of the rock group The Young Rascals. They lived together for some time in her Manhattan apartment at 310 West 47th St. After his group found success, Miller found it hard to cope with his affairs. "He was the first guy to break my heart. I was so sad. We split, and he moved out and into his own place", she recalled.

She was later romantically linked to Jimi Hendrix, David Bowie, David Cassidy, and Mick Jagger.

Miller gave birth to a daughter, whom she placed for adoption. In later years, she attempted to locate her daughter but was unsuccessful.

In later life, Miller found it difficult to maintain regular employment at times lived in homeless shelters. She recalled staying at a battered women's shelter in Park Slope, Brooklyn, as well as shelters on Park Avenue and in Greenwich Village.

In The Andy Warhol Diaries, Warhol noted on November 30, 1985, that Miller called him from a women's shelter, and he referred to her as a "young senile person." "In her Trash days she was our most sensible superstar—then in the seventies she suddenly got crazy. One day she was very down to earth, worrying about her topless dancing career, and then the next week she showed up barefoot to 860, saying that the Mafia gave her LSD because she knew too much!"

She now lives in a one-room apartment in an housing building for low income seniors with disabilities.

== Filmography ==
Year	Title	Role	Notes
1964	Fail Safe	Go-go dancer	Uncredited
1968	Daughters of Lesbos	Dominique	Credited as Dominique
1968	Flesh	Terry	
1968	Sex by Advertisement	Blackmailed Woman	Uncredited
1968	The Wall of Flesh	Miss Leffert	Uncredited
1969	Vibrations	Park's Girlfriend	Uncredited
1969	Fly Now, Pay Later	Carol	
1969	Meeting on 69th Street		
1969	Monique, My Love	Go-go dancer	Uncredited
1970	Trash	Geri, the go-go dancer	
1970	Torture Me, Kiss Me	Whipped Woman	Uncredited
1970	The Magic Garden of Stanley Sweetheart	Extra	
1970	Pound	Extra	
1971	The Telephone Book	Dancer	
1971	Women in Revolt	Girl in Bar	
1973	Blade	Claudwell	
1973	High Rise	Girl Shaking Tassels	
1991	The Beatles: The First U.S. Visit	Herself	Archive footage
