= Critical Condition (film) =

1987 film by Michael Apted

- Theatrical release poster
- Directed by: Michael Apted
- Screenplay by: Denis Hamill; John Hamill
- Story by: Denis Hamill; John Hamill; Alan Swyer
- Produced by: Ted Field; Robert Cort
- Starring: Richard Pryor
- Cinematography: Ralf D. Bode
- Edited by: Robert K. Lambert
- Music by: Alan Silvestri
- Production company: Ted Field – Robert Cort Production
- Distributed by: Paramount Pictures
- Release date: January 16, 1987
- Running time: 98 minutes
- Country: United States
- Language: English
- Budget: $14 million
- Box office: $20.2 million

Critical Condition is a 1987 American comedy film starring Richard Pryor and directed by Michael Apted. The film was released in the United States on January 16, 1987.

== Plot ==
Kevin Lenahan is a con man who is framed in a jewel robbery. To escape custody, he fakes insanity before a judge and then poses as surgeon Dr. Eddie Slattery at a local hospital when he switches places with the administrator Arthur Chambers. During a flood and a power outage that follows, Kevin takes charge of the hospital and tries to maintain some order in his unorthodox way.

== Cast ==
- Richard Pryor as Kevin Lenahan / Dr. Eddie Slattery
- Rachel Ticotin as Rachel Atwood
- Rubén Blades as Louis
- Joe Mantegna as Arthur Chambers
- Bob Dishy as Dr. Foster
- Sylvia Miles as Nurse Maggie Lesser
- Joe Dallesandro as Stucky
- Randall "Tex" Cobb as Box
- Bob Saget as Dr. Joffe
- Joseph Ragno as Palazzi
- Jon Polito as Kline
- Garrett Morris as Helicopter Junkie
- Brian Tarantina as Tommy Pinto
- Cigdem Onat as Dr. Alice Hoffman
- Kate McGregor-Stewart as Nurse Mary
- Lou Walker as Patient with Leg Cast
- Denis Hamill as Maintenance Men
- John Hamill as Maintenance Men
- Ralf D. Bode as Judge
- Wesley Snipes as Ambulance Driver

== Music ==
In 2014, Alan Silvestri's score was released on a limited edition album by Quartet Records, twinned with his music for Summer Rental.

== Reception ==
=== Box office ===
The film debuted at No.1 with $5.7 million.

=== Critical response ===
The New York Times film critic Janet Maslin remarked, "No one in Critical Condition, which opens today at Loews State and other theaters, is working at top form, least of all Mr. Pryor, who looks haggard and agitated much of the time. Still, the film does have an interesting cast and an energetic tempo." The Los Angeles Times wrote that Pryor's performance "is as good as anything he's done in a non-concert movie" but "it still somehow misfires". The South Florida Sun-Sentinel called it a "misguided semicomedy" and wrote, "Judging from this lamebrained film, Richard Pryor's crown as a screen comedy king is slipping off his head." The Chicago Tribune's Dave Kehr wrote that the film "adds, with what has become a glum predictability, one more disappointing title to Richard Pryor's credits". Kehr suggested that Pryor's stage persona, more able to work off immediate audience feedback, worked better than his film persona, with which he "musters only an unctuous sweetness".

== See also ==
- List of American films of 1987
- List of comedy films of 1987
