= The Climber (1975 film) =

1975 film

- Directed by: Pasquale Squitieri
- Screenplay by: Pasquale Squitieri
- Story by: Carlo Rivolta; Pasquale Squitieri
- Starring: Joe Dallesandro; Stefania Casini
- Cinematography: Eugenio Bentivoglio
- Music by: Franco Campanino
- Production company: Laser Film
- Distributed by: Titanus
- Release date: 18 February 1975 (Italy)
- Running time: 110 minutes
- Country: Italy
- Languages: Italian and Neapolitain
- Box office: ₤638.368 million

The Climber (Italian: L'ambizioso) is a 1975 Italian crime drama film written and directed by Pasquale Squitieri and starring Joe Dallesandro.

== Cast ==
- Joe Dallesandro as Aldo, The Climber
- Stefania Casini as Luciana
- Raymond Pellegrin as Don Enrico
- Benito Artesi as Ciriaco
- Ferdinando Murolo as Carlo
- Tony Askin as Man On Train
- Giovanni Cianfriglia as Gianni
- Lorenzo Piani as Bernard

== Release ==
The Climber was released in Italy on 18 February 1975, where it was distributed by Titanus. The film grossed a total of 638,368,060 Italian lire.
