= 24 Hour Sunset =

- Official poster
- Directed by: Édouard de Luze, Charles Derenne
- Written by: Édouard de Luze, Charles Derenne
- Produced by: Édouard de Luze, Paul Samazeuilh, Douglas Gordon, Arthur de Kersauson
- Starring: Kenneth Anger, Paul McCarthy, Raymond Pettibon, Louise Bonnet, Henry Taylor, Jill Mulleady, Ariana Papademetropoulos, Peter Shire, Jeffrey Deitch, Paz Lenchantin
- Narrated by: Joe Dallesandro
- Production company: TAKT
- Distributed by: Canal+ (France), Under the Milky Way (theatrical), Apple TV / iTunes (international)
- Release dates: September 2023 (St. Moritz Art Film Festival); January 5, 2024
- Running time: 91 minutes
- Countries: France, United States
- Language: English

24 Hour Sunset is a 2023 French–American documentary film directed by Édouard de Luze and Charles Derenne. Shot entirely on 16 mm film, it offers a meditative, 24-hour journey through the contemporary Los Angeles art scene, featuring both legendary and emerging artists. The film premiered on Canal+ in France on 5 January 2024 and was later released internationally via Apple TV and iTunes.

== Synopsis ==
The film captures one full day in Los Angeles, from sunset to sunrise, blending studio visits, gallery openings, ambient cityscapes, and artist interviews. The non-linear narrative immerses the viewer in the creative rhythms of the city, offering a visual and sonic portrait of artistic life in motion.

== Cast and Featured Artists ==
The documentary features appearances by:

- Kenneth Anger (final recorded interview)
- Paul McCarthy
- Raymond Pettibon
- Louise Bonnet
- Jill Mulleady
- Henry Taylor (artist)
- Ariana Papademetropoulos
- Peter Shire
- Paz Lenchantin
- Jeffrey Deitch

Narration is provided by Joe Dallesandro.

== Production ==
Produced by the Paris-based studio TAKT, the film was co-directed by Édouard de Luze and Charles Derenne, with artist Douglas Gordon serving as associate producer. Filmed in Los Angeles over multiple weeks, the documentary was shot entirely on 16 mm film, giving it a grainy, analog texture aligned with its meditative tone.

== Exhibition and Release ==
Prior to its commercial release, 24 Hour Sunset was exhibited as a multi-screen installation at major art venues including the Fondation Beyeler (Basel), Lafayette_Anticipations (Paris), and Wönzimer Gallery in Los Angeles.

In February 2024, a large-format video excerpt from the film was displayed as part of a billboard installation on Spring Street in downtown Los Angeles during the Frieze Los Angeles art fair, in collaboration with GrandArmy studio.

The film was officially released in France on 5 January 2024 via Canal+ and made available internationally through Apple TV and iTunes.

== Reception ==
24 Hour Sunset received positive critical attention for its aesthetic and experiential style. The design publication *Communication Arts* described its opening sequence as “a love letter to the Los Angeles art scene,” praising its “visual elegance and emotional tone.”

French art and culture magazine *Oniriq* wrote that the film was “a poetic and hypnotic drift through the hearts and minds of Los Angeles’ artists,” highlighting its 16 mm texture and non-linear approach.

The film has also been shown as part of the official program of BAD+ (Bordeaux Art & Design) and other curated screenings during international art fairs.
