= Andrea Feldman =

American actress

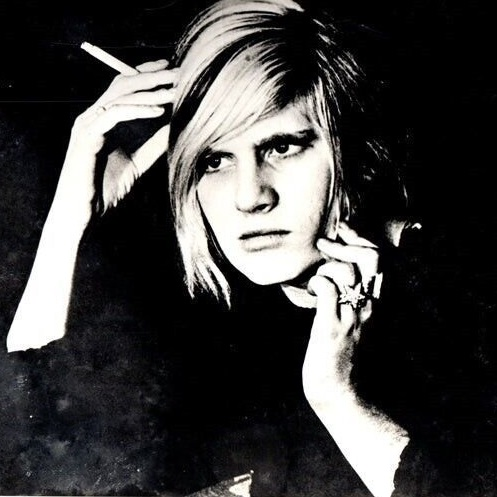
- Born: April 1, 1948; New York City, U.S.
- Died: August 8, 1972 (aged 24); New York City, U.S.
- Other name: Whips
- Occupation: Actress

Andrea Feldman (April 1, 1948 – August 8, 1972) was an American actress and Warhol superstar. She committed suicide in 1972.

== Career ==
Andrea Feldman was a native New Yorker. She attended Quintano's School for Young Professionals, a high school for the performing arts. She starred in three Warhol films; Imitation of Christ, Trash and Heat. A regular in the back room of Max's Kansas City, she pioneered a performance which she called "Showtime", in which she performed a striptease on the round table, at the center of the room. She became known for her dependence on drugs, particularly amphetamines.

Feldman was featured in a 1970 documentary called Groupies, where she referred to herself by a nickname given to her by the Warhol crowd; Andrea "Whips" Feldman. She also often referred to herself as "Andrea Warhol". She was known by her friends as "Crazy Andy." Feldman's friend performer Penny Arcade recalled that "a lot of people in the Warhol scene pretended to be crazy, but Andrea really was. She had endless money for everything but mental health."

Her suicide preceded the release of Heat in 1972, which she had a much larger role than in previous Warhol films. Feldman's performance garnered positive reviews. Judith Crist, a critic for New York magazine wrote: "The most striking performance, in large part non-performance, comes from the late Andrea Feldman, as the flat-voiced, freaked-out daughter, a mass of psychotic confusion, infantile and heart-breaking."

== Death ==
Several days after returning from Europe, Feldman summoned several ex-boyfriends, including poet Jim Carroll, to the New York City apartment of her parents to witness what she called her "final starring role." On August 8, 1972, Feldman jumped to her death at 51 Fifth Avenue. She was holding a bible and a crucifix although she was Jewish.

Photographer Leee Black Childers was dating Feldman at the time and said leading up to her death she had begun to act strange towards him: "Andrea and I were engaged at the time and we were going to get married. It was sort of a ploy at first but it started to get serious. Her parents would commit her to Bellevue now and then to keep her under their thumb." Childers recalled that the day before her suicide, "Andrea stood up on a chair and held a picture of Marilyn Monroe over her head, and she just stood there ... After a long time of just standing there, she said, 'Marilyn died; love me while you can!'"

Feldman's close friend Geraldine Smith wrote in her obituary for The Village Voice and said "Andrea left a note addressed to everyone she knew, saying she loved us all, but 'I'm going for the big time, I hit the jackpot!" Rumors spread that the note that Feldman left behind wasn't as kind as Smith's obituary implied. According to former Interview magazine editor Bob Colacello, "the note wasn't to everyone and it wasn't about love; it was to Andy and it was very, very nasty." Many people associated with the Factory agreed that Warhol was not to blame for her death. Smith later said Feldman's childhood trauma led to her suicide: "Her mother left her alone when she was two years old and she never got over that. She was hospitalized a couple of times. She always planned to commit suicide. But she would blame Andy and say terrible things about him."

== Filmography ==
- Imitation of Christ (1967) - Son's girlfriend
- **** (Four Stars) aka 24 Hour Movie (1967)
- Cleopatra (1970, by Michel Auder) - Cleo´s Girlfriend
- Groupies (1970, documentary) - Herself
- Trash (1970) - Rich Girl
- Heat (1972) - Jessica Todd
