= Donna (TV series) =

- Directed by: Gianfranco Giagni
- Country of origin: Italy
- No. of seasons: 1
- No. of episodes: 6

Original release
- Network: RAI
- Release: March 1996 – April 1996

Donna is an Italian television series.

== Plot ==
The story, set in Ferrara, starring Matilde, wife of a small industrial, Roberto, struggling with a serious crisis in the family; her son, Matteo, falls in love with mother's best friend, Paola, and the daughter Nina leaves her husband Fausto and her son to pursue a modeling career.

Then Nina falls in love with Gianfranco Vezze, financier of a South American multinational business with Roberto. Matilde, who feels neglected by her family, decides to separate for a while from her husband, and during the separation, he meets Enrico, her old love at a young age that lives in Hamburg, and falls in love with him again. But when Nina and Roberto are arrested and charged with fraud and drug dealing Matilde decides to return home. During the process, Enrico reveals to Matteo the true identity of Vezze and his previous in the financial sector, but also reveals that is protected by the corporation for which he works, so it becomes difficult to catch him; Matteo decides to ask Vezze's wife, Lisa Longhi, locked in a psychiatric clinic. Lisa, encouraged by her father, will testify in court, and Roberto will be exonerated from the accusations directed against him, having been cheated by Vezze, which is a fugitive under a false name, involved years earlier in the murder of an entrepreneur in Marseille.

Matteo decides to end the relationship with Paola so as not to suffer too much his mother and falls in love with a girl his age. Nina, after having attempted suicide in prison, and after being in a coma, became reacquainted with her parents and returns to live with her son and her husband, whom he met another woman, Lucia. Matilde, who in the meantime has separated from her husband after a period of reflection and had to deal with Paola the death of her friend Annamaria, moved to Hamburg where she can live peacefully by Enrico her new romantic relationship.

== Cast ==
- Ottavia Piccolo as Matilde
- Angelo Infanti as Roberto
- Simona Cavallari as Nina
- Agnese Nano as Lisa
- Paki Valente as Gianfranco Vezze
- Stefania Casini as Annamaria
- Davide Bechini as Fausto
- Viviana Natale as Lucia
- Daniele Liotti as Matteo
- Imma Piro as Maria
- Emilio Bonucci as Enrico
- Giacomo Piperno as Lisa's father
- Matteo Naldi as Michele
- Edwige Fenech as Paola

== See also ==
- List of Italian television series
