= The Great Scout & Cathouse Thursday =

1976 film by Don Taylor

- Directed by: Don Taylor
- Written by: Richard Alan Shapiro
- Produced by: Jules Buck
- Starring: Lee Marvin; Oliver Reed; Robert Culp; Elizabeth Ashley; Strother Martin; Sylvia Miles; Kay Lenz
- Music by: John Cameron
- Distributed by: American International Pictures
- Release date: June 23, 1976
- Running time: 106 minutes
- Country: United States
- Language: English
- Box office: $3.6 million

The Great Scout & Cathouse Thursday is a 1976 comedy western film directed by Don Taylor starring Lee Marvin, Oliver Reed, Robert Culp, Elizabeth Ashley, Strother Martin, Sylvia Miles, and Kay Lenz.

== Plot ==
In Serendipity, Colorado, before the 1908 United States presidential election, Sam Longwood, a frontiersman who has seen better days, has finally found after 15 years his ex-business partner Jack Colby, who ran off with all the gold from a mine they were prospecting, and also with the love of his life, Nancy Sue. Sam, along with his two other partners, Indian Joe Knox and Billy, along the way pick up a young prostitute nicknamed Thursday. Getting their money is not going to be as easy as they think.

The trio decide to kidnap Nancy Sue and try to get some ransom money for her return to Jack, but Jack does not want her back. After Sam and Thursday spend one night together, Sam starts to take a shine to her and Thursday is cozying up to him; Sam is now torn between Nancy Sue and Thursday. The gang asks Thursday to go into town and prostitute herself so they can buy supplies, and although her feelings are hurt she does. In town, she sees a man and starts to charm him. He eventually invites her to his hotel room. After they settle on a price but before they can start, he is called from the room. Alone, Thursday starts going through his things and discovers that he is Jack Colby. She then takes his money, leaving an IOU signed in Nancy Sue's name. In the morning. Thursday returns with all the supplies and horses to the gang's hideout.

The gang infiltrates a prize fight being promoted by Colby and plots to get their money back by stealing all the box office proceeds. As they race out of town with the box office wagon and money, Colby and his crew give chase. Thursday's "madam," named Mike, chases after the group as well, figuring Thursday is her "property." Finally, the outlaws are caught by Colby and his men, and Thursday gives herself up to keep from having to return to prostitution.

Sam, Joe and Billy are free men, but Sam is wracked with guilt over leaving Thursday behind since now he realizes that he has feelings for her. The gang eventually turns around to go to her rescue. They finally make a bargain with Colby for a boxing match, winner takes the stolen money, and Sam gets Thursday back.

== Cast ==
- Lee Marvin as Sam Longwood
- Oliver Reed as Joe Knox
- Robert Culp as Jack Colby
- Kay Lenz as Thursday
- Elizabeth Ashley as Nancy Sue
- Sylvia Miles as Madam 'Mike'
- Strother Martin as Billy

== Filming ==
Shooting took place in Durango, Mexico over a 12-week period in late 1974 and early 1975.

Richard Alan Shapiro wrote the novelization.

== Reception ==
Radio Times: "worth watching to witness the battle of wills between Lee Marvin and Oliver Reed, in which the former strains every sinew to stop himself lapsing into caricatured mugging, while the latter tempts him to stray with an exhibition of unabashed showboating"

Dana Jung: "Beginning as an Old West tale of revenge, then sidestepping into bawdy slapstick, and ending as a caper film, the movie is at heart a simple romance that exemplifies the story's themes of the old guard meeting the new age."

Justin Mory: "The glaring problem with Scout/Thursday is that we as a culture have moved on since 1976, and the production's edgy R-rated appeal for contemporary audiences will be entirely lost for audiences of today .... What was daringly 'light and frothy' for some audiences in the mid-70s has certainly become problematic in the intervening years.

Tom Seltzer, Columbia Missourian: "refreshing, though, in that it does not attempt any deep social meaning. It is light and amusing, and the audience seemed to enjoy it."
