= Heat (1972 film) =

1972 film by Paul Morrissey, produced by Andy Warhol

- Theatrical release poster
- Directed by: Paul Morrissey
- Written by: Paul Morrissey
- Produced by: Andy Warhol
- Starring: Joe Dallessandro; Sylvia Miles; Andrea Feldman
- Cinematography: Paul Morrissey
- Edited by: Jed Johnson; Lana Jokel
- Music by: John Cale
- Distributed by: Levitt-Pickman
- Release dates: May 1972 (Cannes Film Festival); October 6, 1972 (New York)
- Running time: 102 minutes
- Country: United States
- Language: English
- Budget: $15,000–$100,000
- Box office: $2,000,000

Heat is a 1972 American comedy drama film directed by Paul Morrissey, produced by Andy Warhol, and scored by John Cale. Conceived as a parody of Sunset Boulevard (1950), the film stars Warhol superstars Joe Dallesandro, Sylvia Miles, and Andrea Feldman. It is the final installment in the "Paul Morrissey Trilogy" produced by Warhol, following Flesh (1968) and Trash (1970).

== Plot ==
Joey Davis is an unemployed former child star who supports himself as a hustler in Los Angeles. Joey uses sex to get his landlady to reduce his rent, then seduces Sally Todd, a former Hollywood starlet.

Sally tries to help Joey revive his career but her status as a mediocre ex-actress proves to be quite useless. Sally's psychotic daughter, Jessica, further complicates the relationship between Sally and the cynical, emotionally numb Joey.

== Cast ==
- Joe Dallesandro as Joey Davis
- Sylvia Miles as Sally Todd
- Andrea Feldman as Jessica
- Pat Ast as Lydia, the motel owner
- Ray Vestal as Ray, the producer
- Lester Persky as Sidney
- Eric Emerson as Eric
- Gary Kaznocha as Gary
- Harold Stevenson as Harold (credited as Harold Childe)
- John Hallowell as gossip columnist
- Pat Parlemon as girl by the pool
- Bonnie Walder as Bonnie

== Production ==
Heat was based on an idea by writer John Hallowell. Produced for less than $100,000 and developed without a formal written plot, the film was shot over two weeks in a Hollywood mansion in 1971. The love scenes were filmed several months later during Labor Day weekend at Warhol's house in East Hampton, New York.

== Release ==
In May 1972, Heat premiered at the Cannes Film Festival. The following August, it was shown at the 33rd Venice International Film Festival, becoming the first Warhol production permitted to screen in Italy.

The film was screened at the New York Film Festival on October 5, 1972, before opening the next day at New York's Festival Theatre. It later expanded to the Waverly Theatre in Greenwich Village and the Rialto Theatre in Times Square on October 11. The film grossed $28,000 in its first week of release at the Festival Theatre.

On October 16, 1972, a special screening and reception was held at the Directors Guild of America on Sunset Boulevard in Hollywood. Among those in attendance were Joni Mitchell, Jack Nicholson, Ross Hunter, and George Cukor.

The film was screened at the San Francisco International Film Festival on October 19, 1972, and shown the following day at the Palace of Fine Arts before opening at San Francisco's Music Hall Theatre on October 21.

== Reception ==
The film was well-received by film critics. Rex Reed of the New York Daily News said, "Heat is the most important film to ever emerge from the tropic underground movement, providing freshness and excitement in a dreary Cannes Film Festival to which the establishment has brought large doses of irrelevance and tedium." Derek Malcolm of The Guardian called it "one of the very best things" at the Venice Film Festival. "It succeeds in being both funny and sad, and effortlessly truthful too," he said.

The New York Film Festival screening was standing-room only and was received by a generally enthusiastic crowd however three people walked out, with one lady claiming "It's the most disgusting thing I have ever seen" and referring to the films of the era "Make them, make them, just don't show them to anybody." At a panel discussion following the New York Film Festival screening, Otto Preminger called it "depressingly entertaining".

After previously ignoring most Warhol films, the New York Daily News reviewed the film, with Kathleen Carroll awarding it three stars. The advert for the film was censored in the Daily News with a t-shirt painted on Dallesandro and a bra strap on Miles.

Andrea Feldman, who had a much larger role than in previous Warhol films, committed suicide shortly before the film was released. Her performance garnered positive reviews, with Judith Crist, writing in New York magazine, "The most striking performance, in large part non-performance, comes from the late Andrea Feldman, as the flat-voiced, freaked-out daughter, a mass of psychotic confusion, infantile and heart-breaking."

In a review for the Los Angeles Times, Kevin Thomas described Heat as a "captivating but too drawnout parody of Sunset Boulevard crossed with Where Love Has Gone." He added, that the film "rings true at its core; it's around the edges that indulges in self-defeating spoofery and sexploitation."

Peter Schjeldahl of The New York Times wrote that Heat is "by far the slickest and most coherent specimen of Warholian cinema to date; it is also, for me, the least interesting. If it lacks the harshness and distraction of previous Warhol Factory productions, it also lacks their sense of serendipity and thorny life. Without being boring, it's a bore."

Jerry Stein of The Cincinnati Post described the film as "an unexpectedly cold, harsh comedy in its lack of compassion."

== See also ==
- List of American films of 1972
- List of cult films
- Andy Warhol filmography
