= Sylvia Miles =

American actress (1924–2019)

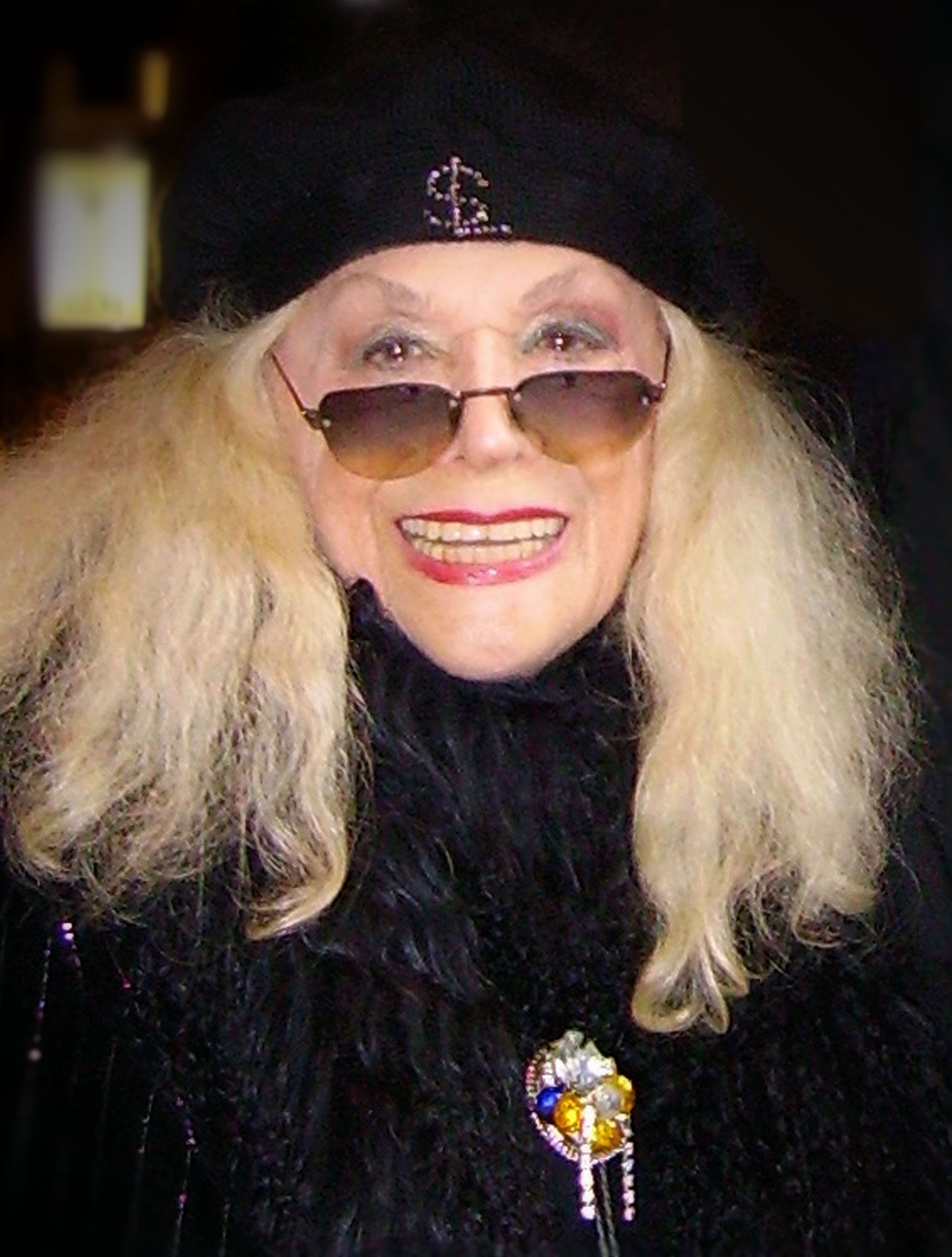
- Miles in 2007
- Born: Sylvia Scheinwald; September 9, 1924; New York City, U.S.
- Died: June 12, 2019 (aged 94); New York City, U.S.
- Education: Actors Studio
- Occupation: Actress
- Years active: 1947–2019
- Spouses: William Myers (m. 1948; div. 1950) Gerald Price (m. 1952; div. 1958) Ted Brown (m. 1963; div. 1970)

Sylvia Miles (née Scheinwald; September 9, 1924 – June 12, 2019) was an American actress. She was twice nominated for the Academy Award for Best Supporting Actress for her performances in Midnight Cowboy (1969) and Farewell, My Lovely (1975).

Miles was a fixture in New York City society, having lived there her entire life. She performed in many Off-Broadway shows, including starring in a one-woman musical based on her life, titled It's Me, Sylvia! in 1981. A documentary about her life titled I Was Always Sylvia aired on New York City public television channel WNET as part of The 51st State series.

== Early life ==
Miles was born and raised in Greenwich Village, New York City. She was the second daughter of Jewish parents, Belle (née Feldman) and Reuben Scheinwald, a furniture maker. She was educated at Washington Irving High School and the Actors Studio.

== Career ==
Miles began her career on stage in 1947, and on television and film in 1954.

In the early 1960s, she played the role of Sally Rogers in the pilot episode of what would become The Dick Van Dyke Show, which was later taken by Rose Marie for the series. Her early television work included appearances in three episodes of Naked City (TV series) and two episodes of Route 66 (TV series) (cf. as Red in "The Thin White Line," Route 66, S2E11). She appeared Off-Broadway in “Ruthless!” The Musical (1992) at the Players Theatre, NYC, playing Sylvia St. Croix (originally played by Joel Vig in drag); she was one of the few females to play the role. She appeared on Broadway in two productions, most notably the 1976 revival of The Night of the Iguana.

Miles was cast in the film Midnight Cowboy (1969) as a middle-aged Park Avenue kept-woman, who invites Joe Buck (Jon Voight) up to her penthouse apartment for sex—another role in which Miles showed off her voluptuous figure. The role earned her an Academy Award nomination for Best Supporting Actress, although she appeared on-screen for about six minutes. She received a second Oscar nomination for Best Supporting Actress for her slightly larger role (eight minutes) in Farewell, My Lovely (1975).

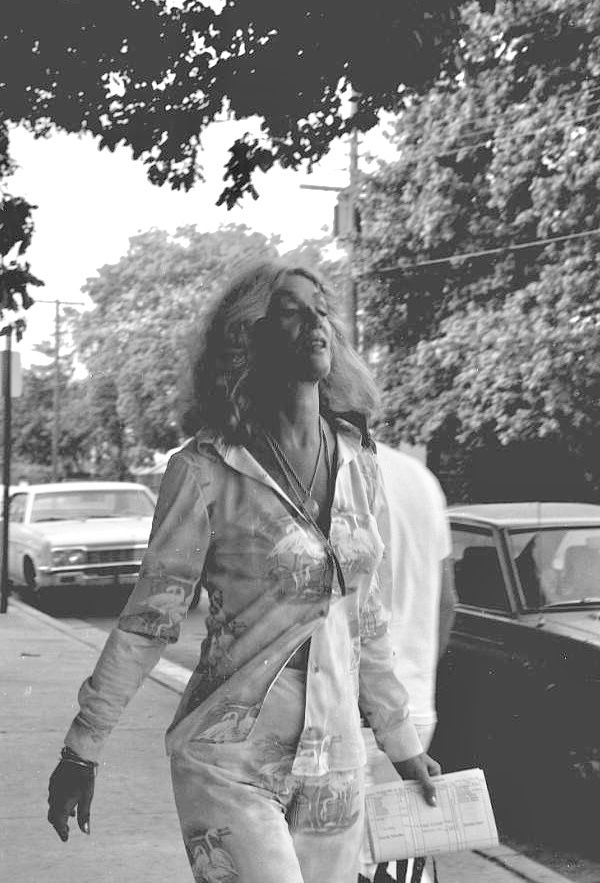
Miles on set of the film 92 in the Shade in Key West, 1974.

Miles starred in Andy Warhol's underground feature film Heat (1972), appearing in a lingering nude scene with Joe Dallesandro. She had a role in the Indian suspense film Shalimar (1978). She appeared in Evil Under the Sun (1982), the film version of Agatha Christie's novel of the same name, portraying a Broadway producer. She played real-estate agent Dolores in the Oliver Stone film Wall Street (1987), a role she reprised in Wall Street: Money Never Sleeps (2010).

Miles was also featured in the mainstream films 92 in the Shade, Critical Condition, The Great Scout & Cathouse Thursday, Crossing Delancey, and the 1989 comedy She-Devil, in which she played the mother of Meryl Streep's character. In her final years, Miles appeared in a few roles on television such as Sex and the City and One Life to Live, and in the films Go Go Tales and Wall Street: Money Never Sleeps.

In 1975, Miles complained about being typecast as a prostitute in almost all of her then 14 movies and 26 off-Broadway plays to date. "Do I look like a prostitute? What does a hooker look like, anyway? Me?"

In a New York restaurant in 1973, Miles publicly dumped a plate of food onto critic John Simon's head for his negative comments about her in a review of a play she starred in.

Wayland Flowers and his puppet Madame first uttered the widely quoted line, "Sylvia Miles and Andy Warhol would attend the opening of an envelope". In 1976, People magazine repeated the joke in the article "What Would a Manhattan Party Be Without the Ubiquitous Sylvia Miles?" without citing a source.

== Personal life ==
In 1948, Miles married William Myers, but the couple divorced two years later. From 1952 to 1958, she was married to Gerald Price. From 1963 to 1970, she was married to radio disc jockey Ted Brown. Brown cited Miles' lack of desire to have children as the main cause for their divorce.

Miles dated Rudolf Martinus, a model, in the 1970s.

In the 1960s and the 1970s she often played chess at a competitive level and was a member of the Manhattan Chess Club.

=== Death ===
Miles died on June 12, 2019, while en route to Mount Sinai Hospital in Manhattan at the age of 94. She had been in declining health in recent years and was in nursing home care in her final months. During Miles' final years she was suffering from anemia and respiratory issues.

== Filmography ==
=== Film ===
Year	Title	Role	Notes
1960	Murder, Inc.	Sadie	
1961	Parrish	Eileen	
1963	Violent Midnight	Silvia	
1964	Pie in the Sky	Rose	
1969	Midnight Cowboy	Cass	Nominated—Academy Award for Best Supporting Actress
1971	The Last Movie	Script Clerk	
1971	Who Killed Mary What's 'Er Name?	Christine	
1972	Heat	Sally Todd	
1975	Farewell, My Lovely	Jessie Halstead Florian	Nominated—Academy Award for Best Supporting Actress
1975	92 in the Shade	Bella	
1976	The Great Scout & Cathouse Thursday	Madam 'Mike'	
1977	The Sentinel	Gerde	
1978	Zero to Sixty	Flo Ames	
1978	Shalimar	Countess Rasmussen	
1981	The Funhouse	Madame Zena	
1982	Evil Under the Sun	Myra Gardener	
1987	Critical Condition	Maggie	
1987	Sleeping Beauty	Red Fairy	
1987	Wall Street	Dolores the Realtor	
1988	Crossing Delancey	Hannah Mandelbaum	
1988	Spike of Bensonhurst	Congresswoman	
1989	She-Devil	Francine Fisher	
1995	Denise Calls Up	Gail's Aunt Sharon	
2000	The Boys Behind the Desk		
2002	High Times' Potluck	Ma	
2003	Rose's	Ms. P	
2007	Go Go Tales	Lilian Murray	
2010	Wall Street: Money Never Sleeps	Dolores the Realtor	
2019	Japanese Borscht	Mary Tess	(final film role)

=== Television ===
Year	Title	Role	Notes
1970	The Tonight Show Starring Johnny Carson	Herself	3 episodes
1971-1974	The Mike Douglas Show	Herself	5 episodes
1985	Miami Vice	Muriel Goldman	1 episode
1986	The Equalizer	Mother	Episode: "Out of the Past"
2002	One Life to Live	Stella	
2002	Sex and the City	Joan	1 episode

=== Stage ===
Year	Title	Role	Notes
1954	A Stone for Danny Fisher	Arlene	Downtown National Theatre, Off-Broadway
1957	The Iceman Cometh	Margie the Prostitute	Circle in the Square Theatre Downtown, Off-Broadway
1961	The Balcony	Marlyse, The Brothel Thief	Circle in the Square Theatre Downtown, Off-Broadway
1962	A Chekhov Sketchbook	Raisa/The Witch	Gramercy Arts Theatre, Off-Broadway
1963	The Riot Act	Rose	Cort Theatre, Broadway
1966	The Kitchen	Monique	81st Street Theatre, Off-Broadway
1972	Rosebloom	Sylvie	Eastside Playhouse, Off-Broadway
1976	The Night of the Iguana	Maxine Faulk	Circle in the Square Theatre, Broadway
1978	Vieux Carré	Mrs. Wire	Piccadilly Theatre
1981	It's Me, Sylvia!	Self	Playhouse Theatre, Off-Broadway
1984	Oh Dad, Poor Dad, Mamma's Hung You in the Closet and I'm Feelin' So Sad	Madame Rosepettle	River Arts Repertory
1992	Ruthless!	Sylvia St. Croix (Replacement)	The Players Theatre, Off-Broadway

== Awards and nominations ==
Year	Award	Category	Nominated work	Result
1970	Academy Awards	Best Supporting Actress	Midnight Cowboy	Nominated
1976	Academy Awards	Best Supporting Actress	Farewell, My Lovely	Nominated
2003	New York International Independent Film & Video Festival	Best Supporting Actress	High Times' Potluck	Won
