= Je t'aime moi non plus (film) =

- Theatrical poster
- Directed by: Serge Gainsbourg
- Written by: Serge Gainsbourg
- Produced by: Claude Berri; Jacques-Eric Strauss
- Starring: Jane Birkin; Joe Dallesandro; Hugues Quester
- Cinematography: Willy Kurant
- Edited by: Kenout Peltier
- Music by: Serge Gainsbourg
- Distributed by: AMLF (1976) (France)
- Release date: 10 March 1976
- Running time: 89 minutes
- Country: France
- Language: French

Je t'aime moi non plus (English title: I Love You, Me Neither) is a 1976 French erotic drama film written, directed, and scored by Serge Gainsbourg, starring Jane Birkin, Hugues Quester and Joe Dallesandro, and featuring a cameo by Gérard Depardieu.

== Plot ==
A frail and love-starved young woman, Johnny (Jane Birkin), works in a truckstop café in the middle of nowhere. One day two gay truckers enter, manly and worldwise Krassky (Joe Dallesandro) and his younger lover Padovan (Hugues Quester). Padovan is young and handsome, but immature and rather a handful.

Krassky, tired of taking care of Padovan, who keeps getting into trouble, discovers in himself an attraction for this boyish girl. She in turn falls head over heels for him. They start a relationship; though Krassky hesitates before the meager feminine graces of curveless Johnny, he ends up being charmed by her naïve and unconditional love.

She is willing to accept anything out of love for him, including anal sex. Although inexperienced at this, so that her screams of pain cause them to be thrown out of several motels. In the end, the back of Krassky's dirty garbage truck will be the theatre of their union.

Furiously jealous, Padovan tries to kill Johnny by suffocating her. Krassky intervenes and saves Johnny, but does it so casually that Johnny gets enraged and insults him. Krassky then returns to his first love and leaves with him, abandoning Johnny to her café, brokenhearted and lonely once again.

== Cast ==
- Jane Birkin as Johnny
- Joe Dallesandro (Note: Dubbed into French by Francis Huster.) as Krassky
- Hugues Quester as Padovan
- Reinhard Kolldehoff as Boris
- Gérard Depardieu as man on horse
- Jimmy Davis as Moïse
- Maïté Nahyr as prostitute
- Liliane Rovère as motel client
- Michel Blanc as worker
- Claudia Butenuth as customer

== Background and production ==
Je t'aime moi non plus was the first film directed by Gainsbourg. It took its title from his song "Je t'aime... moi non plus" and stars Jane Birkin, his partner, who performed the song with him in a scandal-provoking 1969 release. Dallesandro, cast as Krassky and known for his muscular build and for his association with underground and "B" movies, was at the time one of the few "overtly sexualized" performers in film. He regarded this film as one of his best. Depardieu appears briefly as a gay local.

The film's themes of sexual freedom and the ultimate unachievability of all-encompassing love are typical of the 1970s and of Gainsbourg's work.

== Release and reception ==
Released in France on March 10, 1976, the film was panned in reviews as immoral and did poorly, but was defended by French cinephiles including François Truffaut. It was released on video by the independent label Western Connection in 1994, and in the mid-2000s it was released on DVD. A restored version was released in the United States in 2019.

Film review aggregator Rotten Tomatoes reports a 91% approval critic response based on 11 reviews, indicating "Fresh" and an average score of 8.0/10.
