= Bruce Pecheur =

American model and actor (1942–1973)

Bruce Pecheur (April 26, 1942 – August 16, 1973) was an American actor and model. After graduating from Harvard University, Pecheur established himself as a prominent commercial and fashion model in the late 1960s. He transitioned into acting in the early 1970s, appearing in Andy Warhol's Trash (1970) and securing small roles in several films of the period. Pecheur was stabbed to death by an intruder in his Greenwich Village apartment in 1973.

== Early life and education ==
Bruce Pecheur was born on April 26, 1942, and raised in Syosset, New York on Long Island. "Good area to grow up in because it still had the magic of Gatsby," he later recalled. His father was a realtor.

Pecheur served as captain of his high school football team and excelled academically as well, earning scholarships to several Ivy League institutions, including Yale, MIT, Harvard, and Cornell. "He was the best all-around kid we ever had at Syosset High School," said track coach Clint Miller. He graduated from high school in 1960.

Pecheur attended Harvard College, where he studied under Henry Kissinger, and graduated in 1964 with a bachelor's degree in political science. While at Harvard, he was known as a sociable and popular student, played rugby, and was a member of the Fly Club. According to his classmate, he often dressed in distinctive secondhand fashion sourced from the Cambridge shop Max Keezer's. He spent his college summers teaching lifesaving. "I was a good swimmer because I was terrified of the water as a child… I couldn’t float; I still can't. I've taught five thousand people how to float… I'm still scared of the water because I know if I stop swimming, I'll drown." After receiving a master's degree in European art history at Harvard, he taught physics for a year at a Massachusetts high school before pursuing a career in film and the arts in New York.

== Career ==
=== Modeling career ===
Pecheur became widely visible as a commercial and fashion model in the late 1960s. Represented by the Ford Modeling Agency, he worked in both print and television commercials, including campaigns for Noxema ski cream, Nescafé coffee, Gillette and Schick razors, and L&M and Silva Thins cigarettes.

He appeared in advertisements for McGregor shirts, Manhattan clothing, and various whisky and lifestyle brands, and was featured in publications including The New Yorker and Esquire. He also modeled in a Rolls-Royce advertisement and served as a figure for women's high-fashion editorials. His final major photo spread appeared in the June 1973 issue of Men's Wear, where he modeled "The Gatsby Look."

Described as slightly under six feet tall with dark hair, pronounced features, and a muscular build, Pecheur trained regularly with weights and maintained a distinct physical presence that contributed to his modeling success.

=== Acting career ===
Pecheur stated that he initially turned to modeling to finance his own 16mm filmmaking equipment and that he gained early experience by filming off-off-Broadway productions. His acting career began with bit parts in Off-Broadway productions, including work with the Theater of the Ridiculous. He was cast as the lead in the play The Moke Eater (1968) directed by John Vocaaro.

He made his film debut as Warhol superstar Jane Forth's husband in Andy Warhol's Trash (1970), followed by small parts in The Road to Salina (1970) and Cry Uncle! (1971). He had a minor role as an uncredited party guest in The Way We Were (1973), starring Barbra Streisand and Robert Redford. Friends and colleagues described him as dedicated to developing his craft, studying acting seriously and pursuing increasing opportunities in film. At the time of his death, Pecheur had recently finished filming a production called Primavera Mortal in Yugoslavia, where he held a lead role.

== Death ==
On August 16, 1973, Pecheur was killed by an intruder during a home invasion inside Pecheur's apartment at 3 Ninth Avenue in the West Village. The incident occurred amid heightened concern about crime in Greenwich Village and received widespread media attention.

At about 2 a.m., Pecheur and his wife, Lucy Pecheur, were awakened to find a man standing at the foot of their bed in their second-floor apartment. He was armed with a butcher knife and ordered them to stay quiet. The intruder demanded money, ripped a bedsheet into strips, and tied Pecheur up before taking Mrs. Pecheur at knifepoint into the living room, where she handed over $40. In the meantime, Pecheur managed to free himself and retrieve a .38-caliber pistol from his collection. When the burglar returned to the bedroom, Pecheur was waiting for him. "Now I'm going to have to hurt you," the intruder said when he saw the pistol. He attacked Pecheur, who fired four shots, striking him at least once in the chest. Pecheur was stabbed multiple times, including a fatal wound to the heart. Both men died within minutes before the police arrived. Pecheur lay sprawled on the bed with the pistol in his hand; the intruder was found on the floor at the foot of the bed, still holding his knife.

According to Lt. Murray Jacobs of the 6th Precinct, the burglar entered through the bathroom window. Fingerprint analysis later identified him as Edward Garcia, also known as Edward Rivera, Ed Santos, and Ramon Cruz. Garcia had a lengthy criminal record dating back to 1961, including convictions for weapons and drug violations. In September 1970, he received a one-year sentence on Rikers Island following his guilty plea to charges of burglary and possession of burglar's tools.

== Personal life ==
Pecheur was married to Lucy Pecheur (née Carmalt), an artist and model who worked under the name Sierra Bandit. The couple had a son named Joaquin. Through his wife, Pecheur was admitted to the Social Register.

He owned a horse farm in Bucks County, Pennsylvania, which he sold shortly before his death, and a house on the beach in Malibu, California.

Although he frequently posed with cigarettes and liquor as a model, he didn't actually smoke or drink.

After a woman was killed just a few blocks from his apartment, Pecheur remarked to his agent, Joe Hunter, "With the way New York is going, you might need a gun just to live here." Concerned for his safety, he began training in karate and kept a licensed collection of firearms.

== Filmography ==
- 1970 Trash
- 1970: The Road to Salina
- 1971: Cry Uncle!
- 1973: Samrtno prolece
- 1973: The Way We Were
