= Flesh (1968 film) =

1968 film by Paul Morrissey

- 1970 German poster
- Directed by: Paul Morrissey
- Screenplay by: Paul Morrissey
- Produced by: Andy Warhol
- Starring: Joe Dallesandro; Geraldine Smith
- Cinematography: Paul Morrissey
- Distributed by: Sherpix
- Release date: September 26, 1968
- Running time: 105 minutes
- Country: United States
- Language: English
- Budget: $4,000

Flesh, also known as Andy Warhol's Flesh, is a 1968 underground film directed by Paul Morrissey and produced by Andy Warhol. Shot on location in New York City, the film stars Warhol superstar Joe Dallesandro as a male hustler who drifts through a single day in Manhattan. Noted for its frank depiction of sexuality, nudity, and everyday urban life, Flesh marked Morrissey's emergence as the principal creative force behind Warhol's filmmaking. The film also marked the screen debuts of Warhol superstars Jackie Curtis and Candy Darling.

Controversial upon its release but a commercial success, Flesh became one of Warhol's best-known films and established Dallesandro as an icon of queer and underground cinema. It was followed by Trash (1970) and Heat (1972), forming an informal trilogy directed by Morrissey and produced by Warhol that brought the aesthetics of New York's underground scene to a wider audience.

== Plot ==
Set over the course of a single summer day in New York City, Flesh follows Joe (Joe Dallesandro), a handsome young male hustler living in New York City. Joe earns money by selling sex to both men and women, moving through a series of encounters that reveal the transactional and emotional detachment of his life. He lives with his girlfriend Geri (Geraldine Smith), who is pregnant and emotionally unstable. While Joe spends the day seeking clients to raise money for an abortion, Geri remains at home, interacting with friends and drifting between anxiety, boredom, and resentment.

Joe's encounters include clients and acquaintances from the city's underground milieu, among them Jackie (Jackie Curtis) and a wealthy female client portrayed by Candy Darling. These interactions underscore Joe's objectification and the casual intimacy of his world. By the end of the film, Joe returns home having secured the necessary money, but the emotional distance between him and Geri remains unresolved, leaving the characters suspended in a cycle of economic necessity and personal alienation.

== Cast ==
- Joe Dallesandro as Joe, The Hustler
- Geraldine Smith as Geri
- Maurice Braddell as The Artist
- Louis Waldon as David
- Geri Miller as Terry
- Candy Darling as Candy
- Jackie Curtis as Jackie
- Patti D'Arbanville as Geri's Girlfriend
- Barry Brown as Hustler

== Production ==
Flesh was filmmaker Paul Morrissey debut solo feature as a director. Morrissey had previously made several films alongside Pop artist Andy Warhol, including My Hustler (1965) and Chelsea Girls (1966).

Joe Dallesandro and Louis Waldon in a scene from Flesh

Flesh was conceived while Warhol was recuperating at Columbus Hospital following near-fatal shooting. During that time John Schlesinger was filming Midnight Cowboy (1969), which featured a party scene with several members of Warhol's entourage, including Morrissey, Viva, Ultra Violet, and the Johnson twins. Warhol initially approved their participation but later resented what he perceived as a dilution of his own engagement with New York's underground scene. "They were spending three million dollars of United Artists' money to make a story of a hustler, and it didn't seem realistic," Morrissey later recalled. When Morrissey reported that Factory people had been used mostly as extras in Midnight Cowboy, Warhol proposed a challenge: "Why don't you go out and make a movie like that, and we could have it out before theirs? And you could use all the kids that they didn't bother to use." This resulted in Flesh, which was based on Joe Dallesandro's experience as a male hustler.

Flesh was filmed over six weekends in the summer of 1968. Most of it was shot at the New York apartment of Warhol's business manager, Fred Hughes, with a scene shot at the Factory. Assisting Morrissey on Flesh was Jed Johnson, whom he had hired in early 1968. After Warhol was released from the hospital, Johnson became his caretaker and live-in boyfriend. Despite Morrissey being credited as the writer for the film, Johnson told After Dark in 1970 that the dialogue was improvised: "A lot of people ask if we have a working script on our movies because the dialogue is so clever … what happens, as usual, is that Paul Morrissey gives a sentence to the actors and has them improvising on a topic while the camera is rolling."

== Release ==
Flesh premiered at the Andy Warhol Garrick Theatre at 152 Bleecker Street in Manhattan on September 26, 1968. Despite receiving little promotion beyond newspaper advertisements, the film became a commercial success. Within a few months, Morrissey claimed that it had "outgrossed two other films which opened at the same time with advertising budgets in the $50,000 category."

John Trevelyan, Secretary of the British Board of Film Censors, was wary of issuing Flesh a British Board of Film Classification (BBFC) certificate but had suggested it to distributor Jimmy Vaughan for club screenings. Flesh premiered in London at the Open Space Theatre on Tottenham Court Road on January 15, 1970. On February 3, 1970, following a complaint by a member of the public, authorities raided the Open Space Theatre and confiscated the film. The police decided not to prosecute, and viewing resumed on March 18, 1970. The theater was later convicted on technicalities of licensing regulations. The BBFC passed Flesh with an uncut 'X' certificate on October 27, 1970. On February 9, 1971, Trevelyan issued a statement that was published in the Evening Standard:

This is rather a unique case. Here we have a film which received some very good notices from critics when it opened to club members. The decision of the authorities not to prosecute appears to me to indicate that they do not think the film obscene. In these circumstances it would seem that a film made by a controversial, but none-the-less highly talented person as Andy Warhol should not be withheld from the public.

In June 1970, Vaughan arranged a deal with Constantin Film, one of the largest film distributors in West Germany, to book the film into mainstream cinemas throughout Germany where it was seen by three million people, becoming one of the top five moneymakers of 1970.

The film was subsequently screened at the Nottingham Film Theatre in Nottingham during the weekend of February 19–21, 1971. Flesh received its first public viewing in Britain when it opened at the Essoldo Cinema in Chelsea on March 25, 1971.

== Reception ==
Film critic A. H. Weiler of The New York Times gave the film a mixed review, describing it as "an offbeat, bizarre and often amusing" portrait of a male hustler in New York's underground. He praised Joe Dallesandro's natural screen presence but found the film demonstrates "that even audacious, unadulterated sex can be a trashy bore," and that it "might rate marginal credit as a social document if it weren't so leeringly obvious."

Jonas Mekas wrote in The Village Voice that "its not a good film, but its an interesting one," that "nothing very much stands out, it has no special aesthetic or stylistic values," and that "it remains on the level of a caricature."

Roger Ebert of the Chicago Sun-Times gave Flesh 2½ out of 4 stars, calling it "at least interesting" but "not very good." He praised Paul Morrissey's movement toward narrative filmmaking and Joe Dallesandro's "pleasant, naive, engaging" screen presence, but criticized the film's lack of ambition and argued that its reputation owed more to Andy Warhol's artistic circle than to its cinematic achievements.

In the book Film as a Subversive Art, Amos Vogel writes that the threadbare plot belies something "far deeper and funnier in Morrissey’s unsentimental, accepting attitude toward life, embodied by Joe Dallesandro's brooding, disaffected performance".

== Legacy ==
Flesh ranks 478th on Empire's 2008 list of the 500 Greatest Movies of All Time, and in 2007, The Guardian picked Flesh as one of its "1000 Movies to See Before You Die". It holds an approval rating of 63% on Rotten Tomatoes based on 8 reviews, with an average rating of 7/10.

An image of Joe Dallesandro in Flesh was used on the front cover of The Smiths, the debut LP by The Smiths released in 1984.

== See also ==
- List of American films of 1968
