= Stefania Casini =

Italian actress and film director

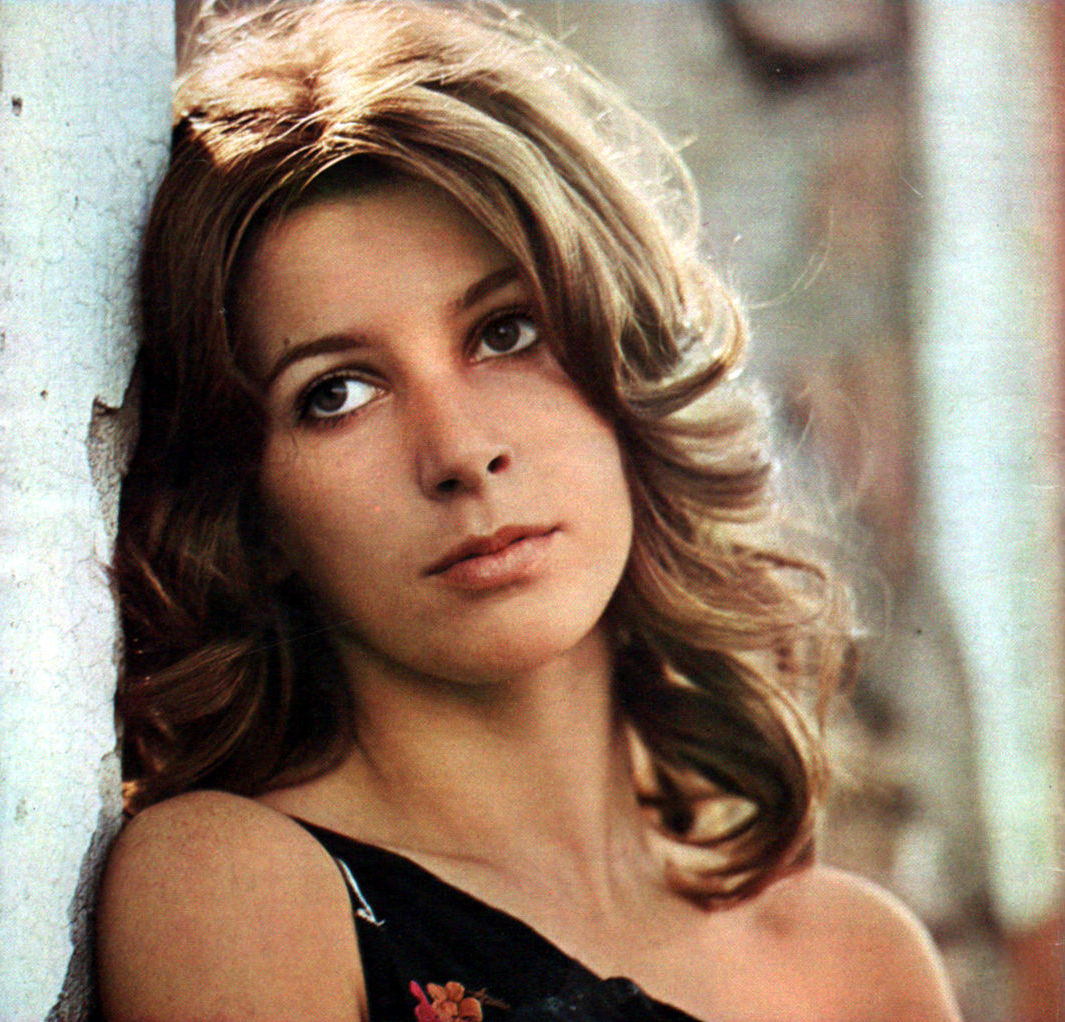
- Casini, c. 1973
- Born: 4 September 1948 (age 77); Villa di Chiavenna, Sondrio, Italy
- Other name: Stefania Cassini
- Education: Polytechnic University of Milan
- Occupations: Actress; screenwriter; director; producer
- Years active: 1970–present

Stefania Casini (born 4 September 1948) is an Italian actress, screenwriter, director, and producer. She appeared alongside Robert De Niro and Gérard Depardieu in Bernardo Bertolucci's 1900 (1976) and received two David di Donatello Award nominations for her work in the 1983 film Lontano da dove. In recent years she was also the visual inspiration for the comics version of Frank Wedekind's LULU adapted by John Linton Roberson. She once posed for Playboy.

Currently she is a director of documentaries.

== Biography ==
Casini studied architecture at the Polytechnic. Casini is married to Giancarlo Soldi.

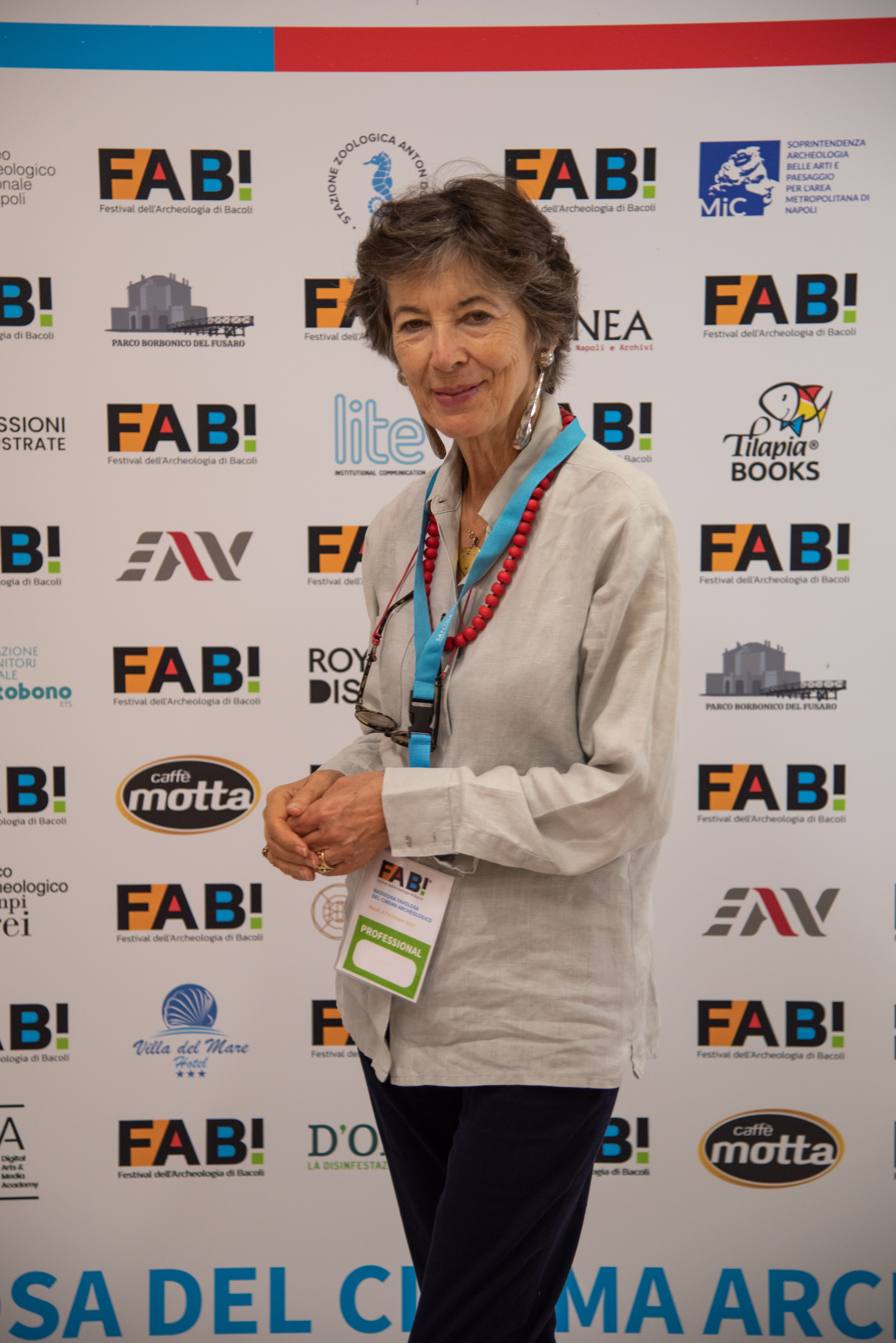
Stefania Casini (2023)

== Selected filmography ==
Film
Year	Title	Role	Notes
1970	A Pocketful of Chestnuts	Carla Lotito	
1974	The Cousin	Lisa Scuderi	
1974	Emergency Squad	Marta Hayworth	
1974	Blood for Dracula	Rubinia	
1975	The Climber	Luciana	
1975	The Big Delirium	Sonia	
1976	Luna di miele in tre	Graziella Luraghi	
1976	1900	Neve	
1977	Andy Warhol's Bad	P.G.	
1977	Suspiria	Sara	
1977	Maschio latino cercasi	Anna	
1978	The Bloodstained Shadow	Sandra Sellani	
1978	How to Lose a Wife and Find a Lover	Marisa	
1978	Bye Bye Monkey	Feminist Actress	
1979	Dedicato al mare Egeo	Gloria	
1987	The Belly of an Architect	Flavia Speckler	
1988	Donna	Annamaria	TV
1992	Damned the Day I Met You	Clari	
2022	The Goldsmith	Giovanna	
