= Angel Guardian Home (Brooklyn) =

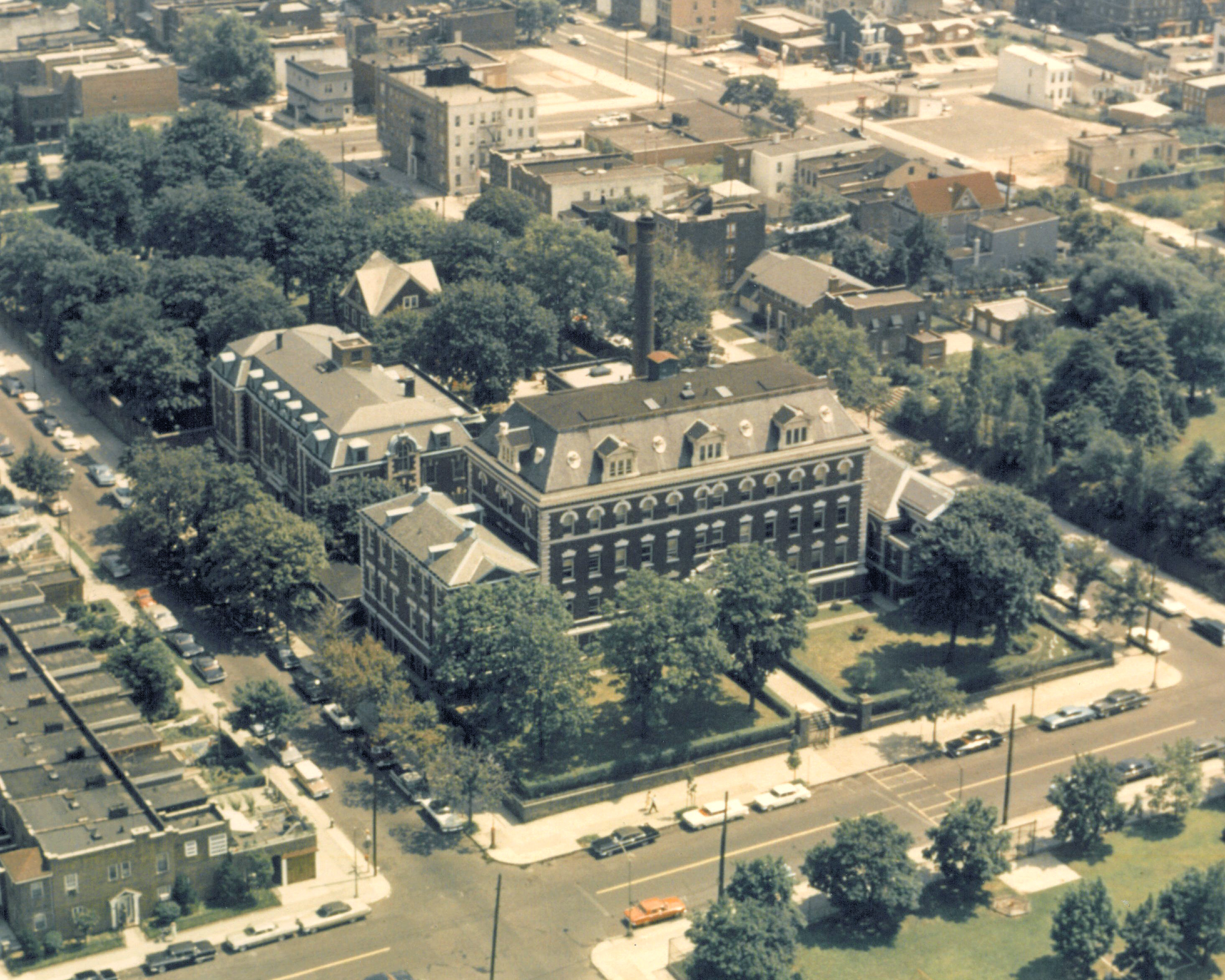
Angel Guardian Home, Brooklyn, NY

The Angel Guardian Home, formerly the Angel Guardian Home for Little Children is a Catholic orphanage in the Dyker Heights area of Brooklyn, New York.

== History ==
The Angel Guardian Home for Little Children was founded in 1899 by the Sisters of Mercy as a sister facility to the order's other New York orphanage, St. Mary's of the Angels Home, which had opened five years earlier in Syosset, New York.

The Angel Guardian Home, on 12th Avenue and 64th Street in Brooklyn, had been taking in orphans since 1863. It served as a further extension of the Convent of Mercy, which was then at 237 Willoughby Avenue. The first child intakes of the Angel Guardian home were sixty young girls aged two to five. In 1903, the Home began accepting young boys as well, and in 1906, a nursery was built so the Home could begin accepting infants. In 1906 the Angel Guardian Home also began foster care placements for their residents. In 1946, a formal adoption program was started. In 1975, the Home opened its first off-site group residence home for teenage mothers and their children.

In 2003, the administrations of Angel Guardian Home and St. Mary’s of the Angels Home merged to form the MercyFirst network of agencies.

Following a decision by the Sisters of Mercy to sell the Angel Guardian Campus, MercyFirst moved its offices from Angel Guardian to Industry City in Sunset Park on September 1, 2017. Plans to sell the property remain with the hope that it can be used to benefit the community by possibly being developed to offer Senior Housing. Individuals formerly cared for or adopted through Angel Guardian can still request a search of the files and records by contacting MercyFirst.

== Criticisms ==
In 1977, New York City Comptroller Harrison Goldin performed an audit of New York City's private foster-care agencies based on a random sampling of five, of which the Angel Guardian Home was one, and issued a stinging report summarizing the findings, alleging that the agencies were essentially warehousing children, and making little if any effort to find permanent homes for them. The report, titled "The Children Are Waiting: The Failure to Achieve Permanent Homes for Foster Children in New York City", detailed how none of the five foster-care agencies, including Angel Guardian, provided services to biological parents to reclaim their children after they had been placed in foster custody, none put children up for adoption in a reasonable time frame after they had been legally certified as adoptable, and none made prompt moves to have children certified as adoptable even though they had been obviously abandoned by their parents, in some cases for years.

In the 1990s, other criticisms surfaced that the Angel Guardian Home was indifferent to the individual needs of children in its custody. Dorothy E. Roberts, professor at Northwestern University School of Law, detailed a case of Gladys S., who had had her five children taken into foster care for reasons of poverty, only met with opposition and hostility when she attempted to fulfill the testing obligations required for her to reclaim her children from foster care at Angel Guardian.
