= Trash (1970 film) =

1970 film by Paul Morrissey

- Theatrical release poster
- Directed by: Paul Morrissey
- Written by: Paul Morrissey
- Produced by: Andy Warhol
- Starring: Joe Dallesandro; Holly Woodlawn; Jane Forth
- Edited by: Jed Johnson
- Release date: October 5, 1970
- Running time: 110 minutes
- Country: United States
- Language: English
- Budget: $30,000
- Box office: $3,000,000

Trash is a 1970 American drama film directed by Paul Morrissey and produced by Andy Warhol. Starring Joe Dallesandro, Holly Woodlawn, and Jane Forth, the film depicts a day in the life of a heroin addict drifting through New York City and the unstable relationship he shares with his girlfriend. Trash, an unofficial sequel to Flesh (1968), is noted for its candid treatment of intravenous drug use, sex, frontal nudity, and transgender actress Holly Woodlawn's acclaimed breakout performance. Rotten Tomatoes gives the film a rating of 80% from 35 reviews.

== Plot ==
Trash follows Joe (Joe Dallesandro), a heroin addict wandering through New York City over the course of a single day. Living with his dramatic but devoted girlfriend Holly (Holly Woodlawn), Joe has a series of chaotic encounters. Their Lower East Side apartment serves as the film's center, where arguments, reconciliations, and improvised schemes—such as Holly's attempt to secure welfare benefits—play out.

Joe drifts from one situation to another, meeting an array of eccentric characters, including a go-go dancer (Geri Miller), a welfare investigator (Michael Sklar), and the frustrated upper-class couple played by Jane Forth and Bruce Pecheur. The scenes blend dark humor and moments of tenderness, revealing the instability and codependency at the heart of Joe and Holly's relationship. By nightfall, they return home, exhausted but still tied to each other, and the film ends without resolution.

== Cast ==
- Joe Dallesandro as Joe
- Holly Woodlawn as Holly
- Jane Forth as Jane
- Michael Sklar as Welfare Investigator
- Geri Miller as Go-Go Dancer
- Andrea Feldman as Rich Girl
- Johnny Putnam as Boy From Yonkers
- Bruce Pecheur as Jane's Husband
- Diane Podlewski as Holly's Sister
- Bob Dalessandro and Boy on the Street

== Production ==
The film was shot in the basement of director Paul Morrissey in New York City in October 1969. Warhol's boyfriend Jed Johnson, who was the film's editor and sound engineer, told After Dark in 1970 that they did not meet Holly Woodlawn until the day her scenes were shot. "Someone had told Paul about her and Paul told that person to have Holly come up some Saturday afternoon. He met her and we began filming immediately. The fact that it all came out as well as it did was because everyone involved with our films is so creative. No one could write lines like that," he said.

Although Morrissey is credited as the writer, the dialogue was improvised. "A lot of people ask if we have a working script on our movies because the dialogue is so clever … what happens, as usual, is that Paul Morrissey gives a sentence to the actors and has them improvising on a topic while the camera is rolling," said Johnson.

== Release ==
Trash premiered at Cinema II in New York City on October 5, 1970. The same day, an advertisement appeared in local newspapers, signed by Donald S. Rugoff, the theater's owner: "A warning about 'Trash.' It is an X-rated film. No one under the age of 17 will be admitted. It is, in my opinion, not an erotic or 'sex film.' I believe 'Trash' is a very good, sometimes great, movie. I know that it is not a film for everyone, that some people will be offended by its strong language and/or strong images."

The film opened at the Luitpold Theater in Munich on February 18, 1971. Warhol attended the German premiere with Jane Forth, Joe Dallesandro, Paul Morrissey, Jed Johnson, Fred Hughes, and Bob Colacello.

The Greater London Council (GLC) film licensing committee declined to grant Trash a certificate for general release in London. Distributor Jimmy Vaughan announced that he would screen the film at the 15th London Film Festival in November 1971 by converting the National Film Theatre into a private club, which would allow the film to be shown. Some GLC members expressed concern that films refused certificates, such as Trash, could nevertheless be shown publicly during the festival under provisions allowing a limited number of uncensored screenings. In February 1972, Trash was screened at the Birmingham Arts Lab Film Festival. On November 16, 1972, Stephen Murray, Secretary of the British Board of Film Censors, granted the film an X certificate with 3 1/2 minutes of cuts for general release. The film opened at the London Pavilion on February 8, 1973.

== Reception ==
Director George Cukor praised Holly Woodlawn's performance and suggested she should be nominated for an Oscar award, but Gregory Peck said the Academy was undecided over whether to nominate her for Best Actress or Best Actor.

Vincent Canby of The New York Times called the film "true-blue movie-making, almost epic, funny and vivid, though a bit rotten at the core," concluding, "'Trash' is alive, but like the people in it, it continually parodies itself, and thus it represents a kind of dead end in filmmaking."

Variety wrote that the film was "the most comprehensible, least annoying and possibly most commercial of a long line of quasi-porno features from 'Chelsea Girls' to 'Lonesome Cowboys.'

Gene Siskel of the Chicago Tribune gave the film three stars out of four and wrote, "The Warhol-Morrissey world is a strange one, but in many ways, especially if taken in infrequent doses, a far more real world than the formula Hollywood drama or comedy. The actors are solidly in touch with their madness and can improvise with wit."

Roger Ebert of the Chicago Sun-Times gave the film two-and-a-half stars out of four and wrote that it was "aware of its own ludicrousness … The humor grows out of the incongruity of the actors, the situation, the movie, the audience. 'Trash' passes right through pornography and emerges on the other side."

Kevin Kelly of The Boston Globe slammed the film as "worthless excess of an amateur rank beneath consideration."

Kevin Thomas of the Los Angeles Times wrote, "What Morrissey did in his first film 'Flesh' and now in this sometimes uproariously funny, sometimes desperately sad new work is to draw upon the far-out scene of the Warhol superstars and utilize the same basic setups of extended dialogs between two or three people."

Stanley Kauffmann of The New Republic wrote, "Trash is disgusting, not for what it is on screen but for what it is in the minds of the people who made it".

George Melly of The Observer called Trash "a very good film indeed," describing it as both "very funny" and "profoundly tragic." He praised its unsentimental portrayal of heroin addiction, calling it "the best piece of anti-drug propaganda" he had seen, and argued that Morrissey presented his characters without judgment, allowing audiences to draw their own conclusions about their circumstances.

== See also ==
- List of American films of 1970
