= San Diego Surf (film) =

- Directed by: Andy Warhol
- Produced by: Paul Morrissey
- Starring: Taylor Mead; Viva; Joe Dallesandro; Eric Emerson; Ingrid Superstar; Nawana Davis; Michael Boosin
- Cinematography: Andy Warhol; Paul Morrissey
- Edited by: Paul Morrissey
- Release date: October 16, 2012 (MOMA)
- Running time: 90 min
- Country: United States
- Language: English

San Diego Surf is a 1968 feature film directed by Andy Warhol. The film stars Viva, Taylor Mead, Joe Dallesandro, Ingrid Superstar, Tom Hompertz, Eric Emerson, Nawana Davis, Michael Boosin, and Louis Waldon.

Warhol was shot by Valerie Solanas and critically injured shortly after filming was complete, and subsequently the film was shelved. In 1995, Warhol's assistant on the film, Paul Morrissey, was commissioned to finish editing the film.

== Plot ==
Mr. and Mrs. Mead (Mead and Viva) are a married couple renting a seaside mansion to a group of young male surfers. Their daughter (Ingrid Superstar) is pregnant and on the hunt for a husband. Mr. Mead, who is gay, tries to pawn her off to one of the surfers.

Meanwhile, Viva wants a divorce from her husband, who wants a surfer of his own. Tom (Hompertz), a surfer, is inveigled by Mr. Mead to urinate on him. In a close-up, Mr. Mead receives Tom's offering ecstatically, after which he comments, "I'm a real surfer now."

== Production ==
The film was shot in La Jolla, California in May 1968 as a follow-up to Warhol's Lonesome Cowboys (1968) with much of the same cast. Andy Warhol and Paul Morrissey operated two cameras to capture the 16mm color footage.

On June 3, 1968, Warhol was shot by Valerie Solanas, bringing work on the film to a halt. In 1995, Morrissey was commissioned by the Andy Warhol Foundation to finish editing the film using the original editing notes by Warhol and Jed Johnson.

== Premiere ==
The film premiered at the Museum of Modern Art in New York City on October 16, 2012.

== See also ==
- List of American films of 1968
- Andy Warhol filmography
