= The State of Things (film) =

1982 film

- Theatrical release poster
- Directed by: Wim Wenders
- Written by: Robert Kramer; Wim Wenders; Joshua Wallace
- Produced by: Chris Sievernich
- Starring: Patrick Bauchau; Allen Garfield
- Cinematography: Henri Alekan; Fred Murphy; Martin Schaer
- Edited by: Peter Przygodda; Barbara Von Weitershausen
- Music by: Jürgen Knieper
- Distributed by: Gray City (US) Axiom Films (UK and Ireland)
- Release dates: September 1982 (VFF); 18 February 1983 (U.S.)
- Running time: 124 minutes
- Country: West Germany
- Languages: English; French; Portuguese

The State of Things (German: Der Stand der Dinge) is a 1982 West German road film directed by Wim Wenders. It tells the story of a film crew stuck in Portugal after the production runs out of film stock and money. The director travels to Los Angeles in search of his missing producer.

== Plot ==
A film crew in Portugal shoots a black-and-white science fiction film about the survivors on a post-apocalyptic Earth, titled The Survivors. The shooting stops when the production runs out of film stock and money. In an abandoned hotel, the crew waits for money to arrive or a sign from vanished producer Gordon.

As they grow restless and bored, the film depicts some of their philosophical musings and emotional reactions. Director Friedrich Munro finally sets off to find Gordon in Los Angeles. Gordon hides in a mobile home because of money he owes to the Mafia.

== Cast ==
- Patrick Bauchau as Friedrich, the Director
- Allen Garfield (as Allen Goorwitz) as Gordon, the Producer
- Isabelle Weingarten as Anna
- Rebecca Pauly as Joan
- Jeffrey Kime as Mark
- Geoffrey Carey as Robert
- Camilla Mora as Julia
- Alexandra Auder as Jane
- Paul Getty Jr. as Dennis, the Writer
- Viva (as Viva Auder) as Kate
- Samuel Fuller as Joe, the Cameraman
- Roger Corman as the Lawyer
- Janet Rasak as Karen
- Artur Semedo as the Production Manager
- Francisco Baião as the Soundman
- Robert Kramer as the Camera operator
- Monty Bane as Herbert

== Filming ==
The film emerged during the production of Wenders' 1981 Hammett for Francis Ford Coppola. Coppola interrupted the shooting to have the screenplay re-written. Wenders returned to Europe for an intermediate film project, which was not realized in the end. He then went to Portugal to help out director Raúl Ruiz with film stock during the making of his film The Territory (1981). Wenders hired much of the cast and crew to make The State of Things, including lead cinematographer Henri Alekan, the noted photographer of Jean Cocteau's 1946 motion picture Beauty and the Beast. After completing the filming in Portugal, Wenders flew to Los Angeles to shoot the final scenes before continuing work on Hammett.

== Background info ==
The State of Things bears many references to other movies and movie makers. Fictitious director Friedrich Munro's name is an homage to silent film director Friedrich Murnau. The name of his cameraman Joe Corby is an anagram of Joe Biroc. Other film makers and films referred to are Fritz Lang, The Searchers, Body and Soul, Thieves' Highway, He Ran All the Way and They Drive by Night.

The soundtrack includes original music from Jürgen Knieper, as well as tracks from Joe Ely, X and The Del-Byzanteens. Jim Jarmusch was a then member of The Del-Byzanteens which often leads to the misinformation that Jarmusch co-wrote the music score. Leftover film stock from The State of Things was later used on the first third of Jarmusch's 1984 black-and-white film Stranger Than Paradise.

Although the film The Survivors, which the crew is shooting during the opening of The State of Things, was repeatedly called a remake of either Day the World Ended or Most Dangerous Man Alive by reviewers and encyclopaedia, it bears no close resemblance to either except for the post-apocalyptic scenery.

In 1994, Wenders made Lisbon Story, in which the fictitious film director in The State of Things, Friedrich Munro (played again by Bauchau), reappears under the name Friedrich Monroe, having expatriated to Portugal.

== Awards ==
The film won the Golden Lion at the Venice Film Festival of 1982. In 1983, it won the German Film Award in Gold for Cinematography and in Silver for Best Fiction Film.
