= Necropolis (film) =

- Directed by: Franco Brocani
- Written by: Franco Brocani
- Produced by: Gianni Barcelloni; Alan Power
- Starring: Nicoletta Machiavelli; Tina Aumont; Pierre Clémenti; Carmelo Bene; Bruno Corazzari; Viva
- Cinematography: Franco Lecca; Ivan Stoinov
- Edited by: Ludovica Barbani
- Music by: Gavin Bryars
- Production companies: Cosmoseion; Q Productions
- Distributed by: Ripley's Home Video (Italy
- Release dates: 1970 (Belgium); 19 January 1971 (Italy)
- Running time: 124 minutes
- Countries: Italy; United Kingdom
- Languages: German; French; English; Italian

Necropolis is a 1970 Italian-British fantasy horror film directed by Franco Brocani. A dissertation on human evil through the ages, it is considered a cult film, and it was referred to as "a fusion between an Andy Warhol-style improvisation and an ambitious, esoteric subtext that summons all the Western counterculture of the time".

== Plot ==
Shown through a series of loosely connected vignettes of figures from humanity's past, from Attila the Hun, to the "Blood Countess" Elizabeth Bathory, all of which depict various acts of evil both physical and metaphysical.

== Cast ==
- Pierre Clémenti as Attila
- Viva as Countess Bathory
- Carmelo Bene as Devil
- Bruno Corazzari as Frankenstein's Monster
- Tina Aumont
- Nicoletta Machiavelli
- Paul Jabara
- Paolo Graziosi
- Louis Waldon
- Aldo Mondino
- Rada Rassimov
- George Willing

== Release ==
The film was theatrically released in Italy on 19 January 1970.

== Critical reception ==
Time Out praised the film, commending the film's range, score, and Brocani's "contemplative" approach to the material.
