= Eric Emerson =

American musician (1945–1975)

- Born: 1944; New Jersey, U.S.
- Died: May 28, 1975; New York City, U.S.
- Occupations: Musician; dancer; actor
- Children: 4

Eric Emerson (1944 (Note: According to the April 11, 1966 issue of the New York Times, Emerson was 22 years old at the time.) – May 28, 1975) was an American actor, dancer, and musician. He was associated with Pop artist Andy Warhol's Factory scene in New York City. Trained in ballet, he made his film debut in Warhol's film Chelsea Girls (1966) and subsequently appeared in Lonesome Cowboys (1968), San Diego Surf (1968), and Heat (1972).

Emerson also performed with the glitter rock band the Magic Tramps and contributed to the development of New York City's emerging punk rock scene in the early 1970s. He died in a reported hit-and-run accident near Manhattan's West Side Highway in 1975.

== Early life ==
Eric Emerson grew up in a working-class family in New Jersey, where his father worked in construction. His mother encouraged his interest in dance and sent him to ballet school at an early age.

== Career ==
Emerson performed with the Music Mountain Group in northern New Jersey and the New Jersey Ballet Company in Orange, appearing in productions of Brigadoon, Kismet, and The Most Happy Fella. He also worked as a hairdresser and developed skills in carpentry and sewing. He had a store on 9th Street in Manhattan's East Village.

In April 1966, Emerson attracted the attention of artist and filmmaker Andy Warhol while dancing at the Dom, a nightclub in Manhattan. Warhol and filmmaker Paul Morrissey noticed Emerson performing a ballet leap across the dance floor and approached him afterward. Emerson soon became a regular at Warhol's studio, known as the Factory, and made his film debut in Warhol's underground film Chelsea Girls (1966).

Emerson became known for his flamboyant behavior at Max's Kansas City, a Manhattan nightclub that became a gathering place for Warhol's circle of artists, musicians, and performers. He often wore leather hotpants and cowboy boots and yodel on tables. He also flirted with patrons and engaged in sexual encounters with them.

Emerson appeared on the back cover of the Velvet Underground's debut album, The Velvet Underground & Nico (1967), in a photograph taken during a performance of Warhol's multimedia show, the Exploding Plastic Inevitable. His image, projected upside down on a wall behind the band, appeared in the original album artwork without his authorization. Emerson threatened legal action unless he was compensated, prompting Verve Records to recall copies of the album and suspend distribution while the photograph was redacted for subsequent pressings.

In 1968, Emerson appeared in two more Warhol films, Lonesome Cowboys and San Diego Surf, the latter of which remained unreleased until 2012. He subsequently pursued a career in music, joining the Magic Tramps as lead vocalist after the band relocated from Hollywood to New York City in 1971. The group performed under several names, including Messiah and Star Theater, and played a residency at Max's Kansas City.

That year, Emerson also appeared in Jackie Curtis's play Vain Victory: Vicissitudes of the Damned, alongside Ondine, Holly Woodlawn, and Candy Darling. He returned to Warhol's films for Heat (1972), directed by Morrissey. Daphne Davis of Women's Wear Daily wrote that some felt Emerson was "more artistic" than his co-star Joe Dallesandro "as a sex object."

In 1972, the Magic Tramps regularly performed at the Mercer Arts Center in Manhattan, where they gave the New York Dolls an early opportunity to perform. The Dolls' lead singer, David Johansen, recalled: "Eric Emerson had a band called the Magic Tramps and he said to me one day, 'You know I'm playing at this place, the Mercer Arts Center. Do you want to open for us?' And, I was like, 'Yeah.'… So we played again and then they offered us a night of our own every week in the Oscar Wilde Room."

Musician Chris Stein, later a co-founder of Blondie, recalled meeting Emerson when he went to see the New York Dolls perform. "The whole scene was very accessible, hanging out backstage and all that. Eric was a great character," Stein recalled. After booking the Magic Tramps to play a Christmas party at the School of Visual Arts, where he was a student, Stein became the band's informal roadie. He and Emerson later shared a welfare apartment on 1st Street and First Avenue in Manhattan.

In 1972, Emerson also helped establish an early performance space at the Bowery bar that later became CBGB. Having previously used his carpentry skills to help prepare the Mercer Arts Center for performances, he offered similar assistance to bar owner Hilly Kristal when the venue was operating as Hilly's on the Bowery. Emerson persuaded Kristal to let him and Magic Tramps bandmate Sesu Coleman build a small stage at the bar. Emerson, who frequented the Hells Angels' clubhouse and spent time in the surrounding neighborhood, helped create a venue for emerging downtown musicians. Kristal renamed the venue CBGB in late 1973.

In 1973, Emerson left the Magic Tramps and formed a new band, Angel, in which he played guitar and sang.

== Personal life ==
Emerson was bisexual and known to be promiscuous. His friend Leee Black Childers recalled, "He loved sex like he loved life, passionately and constantly. He was bisexual long before it was universally accepted as cool, and open and exhibitionistic about his sexploits to a point that would make Tallulah Bankhead blush."

When his father accused him of being "a little sweet," Emerson replied, "What he don't understand is that my generation can swing both ways." On July 21, 1969, Emerson agreed to take part in a mock wedding with Warhol superstar Jackie Curtis. Organized by Curtis as a publicity stunt, the ceremony attracted coverage from The Village Voice. When Emerson failed to appear, Curtis married one of the wedding guests instead.

Emerson was married once and had four children. He had a daughter, Erica, with his wife Chris, and they lived at 436 East 9th Street. He had another daughter, Monique, with Krysteen in 1969. He had a son, Branch Emerson, with Elda Gentile, the lead singer of the rock band the Stilettos. In 1971, Emerson and fellow Warhol superstar Jane Forth had a son, Emerson Forth.

At the time of his death, Emerson was living with Barbara Winter, the former wife of musician Edgar Winter.

== Death ==
On May 28, 1975, Emerson's body was found beside his bicycle near the West Side Highway in Manhattan. His death was officially recorded as a hit-and-run accident. No one has been arrested or charged in connection with his death. Following a weekend-long wake organized by Mickey Ruskin, the owner of Max's Kansas City, Emerson was buried in Wharton, New Jersey.

After his death, rumors circulated that Emerson had died of a heroin overdose at another location and that his body had been moved to make the death appear to be a hit-and-run accident.

In the book Making Tracks: The Rise of Blondie, singer Debbie Harry recalled spending time with Emerson shortly before his death, when they were working on a recording of Blondie's song "Heart of Glass" using his Teac four-track tape recorder. Harry remembered that Emerson appeared distressed when she and her companions left his apartment. The following morning, his partner, Barbara Winter, called with the news of his death. "He had been a good friend and inspiration to so many people. We didn't quite understand what had happened, but we went up to a party/wake held for him and saw a lot of people from the earlier glitter days. Eric's death definitely marked an end to the glitter period. We still miss him," Harry said.

== Filmography ==
Year	Title	Role	Notes
1966	Chelsea Girls	Himself	Directed by Andy Warhol and Paul Morrissey
1966	3 Min. Mary Might		Directed by Andy Warhol
1966	The Velvet Underground Tarot Cards	Himself	Directed by Andy Warhol
1967	**** (Four Stars)		Directed by Andy Warhol
1968	Lonesome Cowboys	Eric	Directed by Andy Warhol
1968	San Diego Surf	Eric	Released in 2012
1968	Home Movies: NYC to San Diego		Directed by Taylor Mead
1969	The Mind Blowers		Directed by Harlan Renvok
1971	Andrea Feldman at Max's	Himself	Directed by Anton Perich
1971	Max's Kansas City	Himself	Directed by Anton Perich
1972	Heat	Eric	Directed by Paul Morrissey
