= Love Not War =

Love Not War may refer to:

- "Love Not War", a track from Emeli Sandé 2017 EP Kingdom Comin
- "Love Not War (The Tampa Beat)", a 2020 single by Jason Derulo and Nuka

== See also ==
- Make love not war, an anti-war slogan
- Make Love, Not War, full title Make Love Not War: The Sexual Revolution: An Unfettered History, a 2001 book by David Allyn
