= 55th Street Playhouse =

Former theater in Manhattan, New York

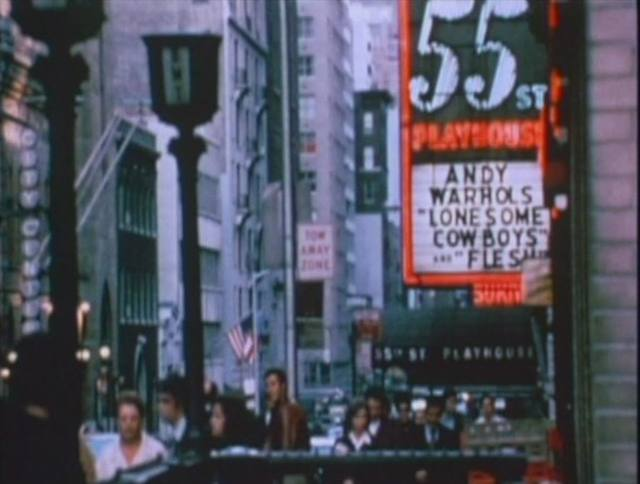
- 55th Street Playhouse (vintage image)
- Interactive map of 55th Street Playhouse
- Former names: 55th Street Cinema; Europa Theatre

General information
- Architectural style: Late 19th and early 20th century American movements, other
- Location: 154 West 55th Street; New York, NY 10022
- Coordinates: 40.763743°N 73.980443°W
- Completed: 1888

Design and construction
- Architects: Bassett Jones and Maurice Fatio

The 55th Street Playhouse—periodically referred to as the 55th Street Cinema and Europa Theatre—was a 253-seat movie house at 154 West 55th Street, Midtown Manhattan, New York City, that opened on May 20, 1927. Many classic art and foreign-language films, including those by Jean Cocteau, Sergei Eisenstein, Federico Fellini, Abel Gance, Fritz Lang, Josef Von Sternberg and Orson Welles, were featured at the theater. Later, Andy Warhol presented many of his notable films (including Flesh (1968) and Lonesome Cowboys (1968) and others) in this building (as well as in other area theaters, including the New Andy Warhol Garrick Theatre) in the late 1960s. Other notable films were also shown at the theater, including Boys in the Sand (1971) and Him (1974).

== History ==
Originally, the theater was built to be a horse stable in 1888 by Charles T. Barney, a banker who later became president of the Knickerbocker Trust Company. The upper stories were rented out as The Holbein Studios, and were occupied by artists, such as John Singer Sargent, impressionist painter Childe Hassam, and portrait artist Cecilia Beaux. Later, in the late 1920s, the stable building was converted into a movie theater.

== Warhol years ==
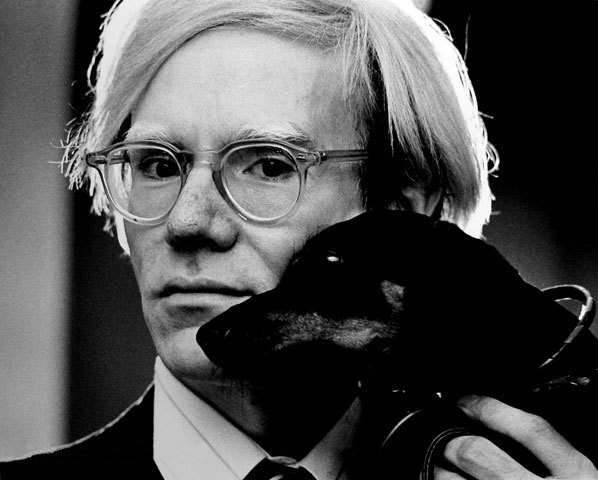
Andy Warhol

As an advertisement illustrator in the 1950s, Warhol used assistants to increase his productivity. Collaboration would remain a defining (and controversial) aspect of his working methods throughout his career; this was particularly true in the 1960s. One of the most important collaborators during this period was Gerard Malanga. Malanga assisted the artist with the production of silkscreens, films, sculpture, and other works at "The Factory", Warhol's aluminum foil-and-silver-paint-lined studio on 47th Street (later moved to Broadway). Other members of Warhol's Factory crowd included Freddie Herko, Ondine, Ronald Tavel, Mary Woronov, Billy Name, and Brigid Berlin (from whom he apparently got the idea to tape-record his phone conversations).

During the 1960s, Andy Warhol groomed a retinue of bohemian and counterculture eccentrics upon whom he bestowed the designation "superstars", including Nico, Joe Dallesandro, Edie Sedgwick, Viva, Ultra Violet, Holly Woodlawn, Jackie Curtis, and Candy Darling. These people all participated in the Factory films, and some—like Berlin—remained friends with Warhol until his death. Important figures in the New York underground art/cinema world, such as writer John Giorno and film-maker Jack Smith, also appear in Warhol films (many presented at the 55th Street Playhouse and the New Andy Warhol Garrick Theatre) of the 1960s, revealing Warhol's connections to a diverse range of artistic scenes during this time. Less well known was his support and collaboration with several teen-agers during this era, who would achieve prominence later in life including writer David Dalton, photographer Stephen Shore and artist Bibbe Hansen (mother of pop musician Beck).

== Controversy ==
In June 1970, the 55th Street Playhouse began showing Censorship in Denmark: A New Approach, a film documentary study of pornography, directed by Alex de Renzy. According to Vincent Canby, a New York Times film reviewer, the narrator of the documentary noted that "pornography is more stimulating and cheaper than hormone injections" and "stresses the fact that since the legalization of pornography in Denmark, sex crimes have decreased." Nonetheless, on September 30, 1970, Assistant District Attorney, Richard Beckler, had the theater manager, Chung Louis, arrested on an obscenity charge, and the film seized as appealing to a prurient interest in sex. The presiding judge, Jack Rosenberg, stated, "[The film] is patently offensive to most Americans because it affronts contemporary community standards relating to the description or representation of sexual matters."

== Current use ==
The 55th Street Playhouse building was partly rebuilt in the 1980s, and the ground floor, at 154 West 55th Street, was altered to be a truck entrance. (Note: Google Maps Street View imagery shows that this is still the case as of June 2019.)

== See also ==
- Blue Movie
- Golden Age of Porn (1969–1984)
- New Andy Warhol Garrick Theatre
- The Factory
