= The Nude Restaurant =

- Directed by: Andy Warhol
- Produced by: Andy Warhol
- Starring: Viva; Louis Waldon; Billy Name; Taylor Mead; Joe Campbell; Allen Midgette; Rolando Peña; Electrah; Rod LaRod; Ingrid Superstar; Julian Burroughs
- Production company: Andy Warhol Films
- Distributed by: The Factory; Film-makers' Cooperative
- Release date: 13 November 1967 (NYC)
- Running time: 95 minutes 100 minutes
- Country: United States
- Language: English

The Nude Restaurant, also billed as Nude Restaurant, is a 1967 feature-length underground film directed by Andy Warhol, and starring Viva, Louis Waldon, Taylor Mead, Billy Name, Allen Midgette, and Rolando Peña. Different versions of the film exist, with one being an all-male, all-nude cast, and the other with all actors in G-strings. It was filmed in one day at the Mad Hatter Restaurant in Manhattan in October 1967.

== See also ==
- Andy Warhol filmography
