= Jack of Spades (1960 film) =

- Directed by: Yves Allégret
- Written by: Yves Allégret; Albert Vidalie
- Produced by: Sacha Kamenka
- Starring: Eddie Constantine; Raymond Pellegrin; Pierre Clémenti; Henri Cogan; Moustache; Marie Versini
- Cinematography: Michel Kelber
- Music by: Michel Legrand
- Production companies: Aves; Belmont Films
- Release date: 21 December 1960
- Running time: 90 minutes
- Country: France
- Language: French

Jack of Spades (French: Chien de pique) is a 1960 French drama film directed by Yves Allégret and starring Eddie Constantine, Raymond Pellegrin and Marie Versini.

== Synopsis ==
A retired gangster settles down on a ranch to raise cattle. However, his former life comes back to pursue him.

== Cast ==
- Eddie Constantine as Patrick
- Raymond Pellegrin as Robert
- Marie Versini as Zita
- Georges Douking as Le vieux Manuel
- Henri Cogan as Un guardian
- Pierre Clémenti as Paco
- Moustache as Le patron du café
- Jean-Marc Allègre as Un riziculteur
- James Campbell
- Guy Estève
- François Périer
- Jean Roux
- Francis San Juan

== Bibliography ==
- Maurice Bessy & Raymond Chirat. Histoire du cinéma français: 1956-1960. Pygmalion, 1990.
