= New Old =

- Directed by: Pierre Clémenti
- Screenplay by: Pierre Clémenti
- Produced by: Pierre Clémenti
- Starring: Pierre Clémenti; Viva; Nadine Hermand
- Cinematography: Pierre Clémenti
- Edited by: Philippe Puicouyoul; Pierre Clémenti
- Music by: Jean-Pierre Kalfon
- Production company: Centre Georges Pompidou
- Distributed by: Choses Vues (France) (DVD)
- Release date: 21 November 1979
- Running time: 67 minutes
- Country: France
- Language: English

New Old (New old ou les chroniques du temps présent), is a French film directed by Pierre Clémenti, released in 1979. It is the second part of an experimental trilogy comprising 'Visa De Censure No.X', 'Livre De Famille' and 'Anima Mundi'. The Village Voice wrote, "Clémenti's New Old (1979—subtitled Chronicles of the Present Times) flows together footage from more than a decade of his wandering between scenes, sets, and drugs, an accelerated world tour through various iterations of the "counterculture." There are fragments of Clémenti on film and stage, a pilgrimage to Warhol's New York and scrambled jamming . . . until the soundtrack tightens up guttural punk guitars from Les Lou's."

== Details ==
- Format : Colour - Mono - 16 mm

== Starring ==
- Pierre Clémenti
- Viva
- Nadine Hermand
- Michelle Bernet
- Amin Reyburn
- Nadine Alkan
- Yves Harrisson
- Jean-Pierre Mouleyre
- Jamila
- Tania
