= Pierre Clémenti =

French actor (1942–1999)

- Born: Pierre André Clémenti; 28 September 1942; Paris, France
- Died: 27 December 1999 (aged 57); Paris, France
- Occupations: Actor, filmmaker, writer
- Children: 2

Pierre André Clémenti (28 September 1942 – 27 December 1999) was a French actor, filmmaker, and writer. He was known for his work with several prominent European auteurs during the 1960s and '70s, including Luis Buñuel, Jacques Rivette, Luchino Visconti, Pier Paolo Pasolini, Bernardo Bertolucci, and Dušan Makavejev. He was also a creator of underground films.

== Early life ==
Born in Paris to an unknown father and Rose Clémenti, a Corsican concierge whose surname he took, Clémenti had a difficult childhood and took refuge in literature and the theatre. He studied drama at the Théâtre du Vieux-Colombier and ENSATT.

== Career ==
After beginning his acting career in theatre, Clémenti secured his first minor screen roles in Yves Allégret's Jack of Spades ("Chien de pique", 1960), performing alongside Eddie Constantine. Possibly his best remembered role was as the gangster lover/client of the bourgeois prostitute (Catherine Deneuve) in Belle de Jour (1967) directed by Luis Buñuel, in whose other film The Milky Way (1969) he played the Devil.

He worked with several other prominent European directors, including in highly regarded films of the era, such as The Leopard (Luchino Visconti, 1963), Pigsty (Pier Paolo Pasolini, 1969) and The Conformist (Bernardo Bertolucci, 1970, and Bertolucci's Partner, 1968). Other directors he worked with include Liliana Cavani, Glauber Rocha, Miklós Jancsó, Jacques Rivette, and Philippe Garrel.

After a stint in prison, he played the ever-optimistic sailor of the Potemkin in Dusan Makavejev's Sweet Movie (1974) and the role of Pablo, the seductive saxophone player, in Fred Haines's Steppenwolf (also 1974) adapted from the novel by Hermann Hesse. Throughout his career he continued to be active in the theatre, notably in the company of Marc'O.

Clémenti was also involved with the French underground film movement, directing several of his own films which often featured fellow underground filmmakers and actors. Visa de censure no X was an experimental work composed of two films. New Old was a feature-length work starring Viva released in 1978. He went on to direct La Révolution ce n'est qu'un début, continuons le combat, In the Shadow of the Blue Rascal and Sun.

== Personal life ==
Clémenti married actress Margareth Clémenti (née Le-Van, 1948), mother of his son Balthazar, born in July 1965. Later he was married to Nadine, mother of his second child, Valentin Clémenti-Arnoult.

=== Legal issues ===
In 1972, Clémenti's career was derailed after he was sentenced to prison for allegedly possessing or using drugs. Due to insufficient evidence, he was released after 17 months; later he wrote the book A Few Personal Messages about his time in prison, where he maintains that he was innocent of the charges. The book was published in French in 1973; in 2022, the book was translated into English by Claire Foster and re-released.

=== Death ===
Clémenti died of liver cancer in Paris on 27 December 1999.

== Legacy ==
Clementi was regarded as something of a countercultural figure in his time. He had a retrospective at the Cinémathèque française in March 1998, where he was described as him as the "ideal embodiment of all the adventures of cinematic modernity." He had another retrospective in 2019, at the Festival Toute la mémoire du monde.

== Selected filmography ==
Year	Title	Role(s)	Director(s)	Note(s)
1960	Jack of Spades	Paco	Yves Allégret	
1963	The Leopard	Francesco Paolo	Luchino Visconti	
1967	Belle de Jour	Marcel	Luis Buñuel	
1968	Benjamin	Benjamin	Michel Deville	
1969	Pigsty	Young cannibal	Pier Paolo Pasolini	
1969	The Year of the Cannibals	Tiresia	Liliana Cavani	
1970	The Conformist	Lino	Bernardo Bertolucci	
1971	The Designated Victim	Count Matteo Tiepolo	Maurizio Lucidi	
1972	The Inner Scar	Horseman/Archer	Philippe Garrel	
1974	The Irony of Chance	Antoine Desvrières	Édouard Molinaro	
1981	Le Pont du Nord	Julien	Jacques Rivette	
1987	Un bambino di nome Gesù	Sefir	Franco Rossi	
1989	Hard to Be a God	King	Peter Fleischmann	

== Bibliography ==
- 1973 Carcere italiano. Milan: Il Formichiere.
- 2005 Quelques messages personnels. Paris: Gallimard. ISBN 978-2-07-030748-7
- 2007 Pensieri dal carcere. Fagnano Alto: il Sirente. ISBN 978-88-87847-12-3
