= Allen Midgette =

American actor (1939–2021)

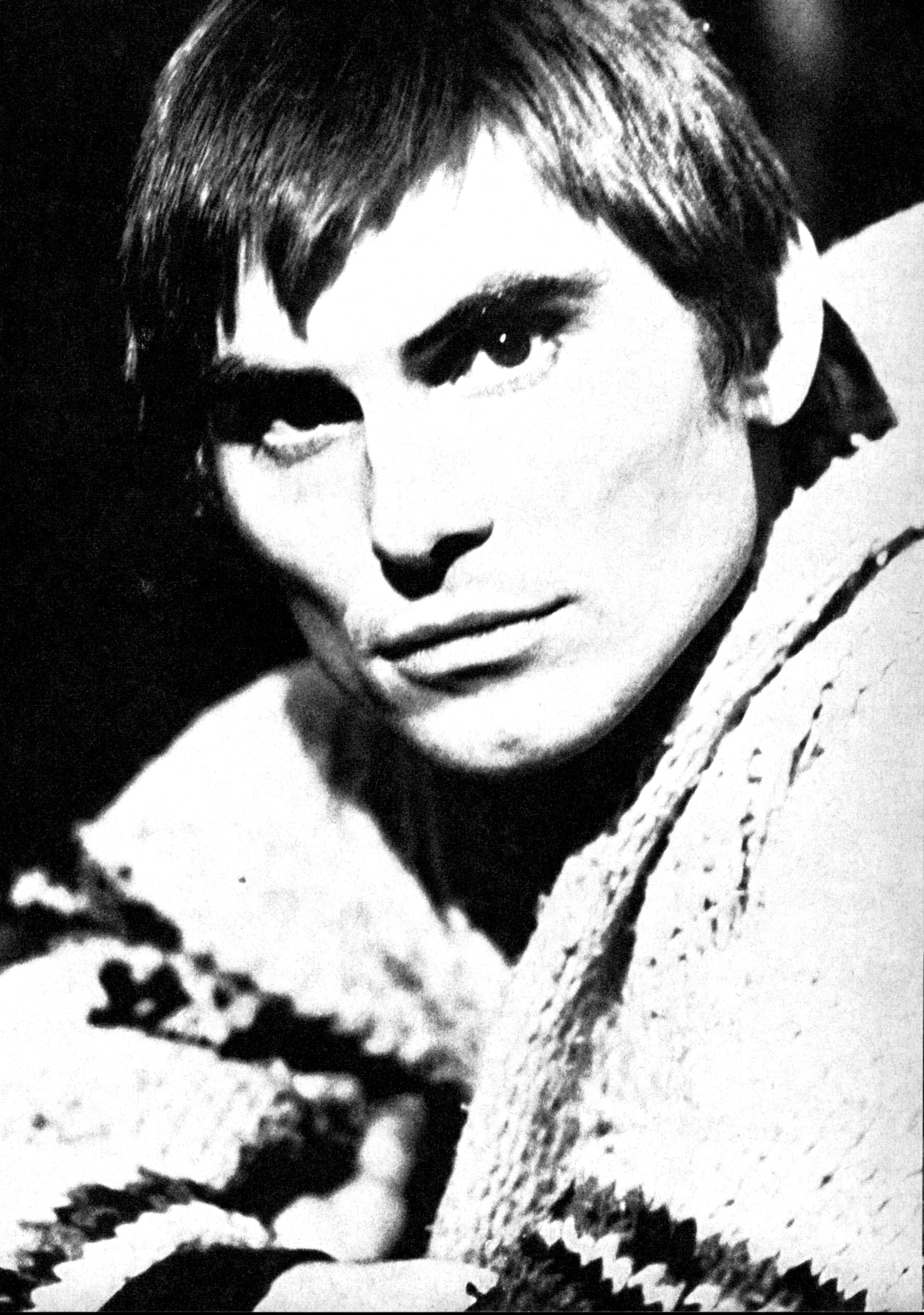
- Midgette by Billy Name, 1966
- Born: Allen Joseph Midgett; February 7, 1939; Camden, New Jersey, U.S.
- Died: June 16, 2021 (aged 82); Woodstock, New York, U.S.
- Occupations: Actor, Painter
- Years active: 1968–2014

Allen Midgette (born as Allen Joseph Midgett; February 2, 1939 – June 16, 2021) was an American actor and painter. He is best known for impersonating pop artist Andy Warhol on a college lecture tour in 1967.

== Life and career ==
Midgett was born in Camden, New Jersey, the son of Dorothy (Jones) and Jarvis Midgett, who was a ship captain and harbor master.

Midgette appeared in two French New Wave-influenced avant-garde Italian films by Bernardo Bertolucci, the then 21-year-old's 1962 directorial debut La commare secca (based on a story by Pier Paolo Pasolini for whom Bertolucci was previously an assistant) and Before the Revolution (1964). He was also an extra in the 1961 film version of West Side Story.

In October 1967, Midgette was sent to impersonate Warhol in appearances at the University of Oregon, the University of Utah, the University of Montana, and Linfield College. He was paid $2,600 for the appearance. Warhol's film collaborator Paul Morrissey stated: "Circumstances prevented Andy from going on the tour at the last minute and he thought it would be nice if he could invent another person in place of himself ... somebody who was a little more talkative and looked a little more dashing. He (Midgett) was a person who had been in some films for us, but we have never been able to pay him any money. Since he went out in place of Andy, we gave him the money from the tour. We put some powder in his hair to make him look older ... and gave him a leather jacket. They have a very similar look."

Midgette appeared in several of Warhol's films, including The Nude Restaurant (1967), Lonesome Cowboys (1968), and Four Stars (1967), in both its 25-hour and two-hour versions.

He later acted in another Bertolucci movie, 1900 (1976), in the role of Vagabond, which, Midgette related, the director wrote specifically for him.

Midgette died on June 16, 2021, in Woodstock, New York at the age of 82.
