= Partner (1968 film) =

- Directed by: Bernardo Bertolucci
- Written by: Gianni Amico; Bernardo Bertolucci
- Produced by: Giovanni Bertolucci
- Starring: Pierre Clémenti
- Cinematography: Ugo Piccone
- Edited by: Roberto Perpignani
- Music by: Ennio Morricone
- Release date: 7 September 1968 (Italy)
- Country: Italy
- Language: Italian

Partner is a 1968 Italian drama film directed by Bernardo Bertolucci.

Based on the 1846 novella The Double by Fyodor Dostoyevsky, it entered the 29th Venice Film Festival and the Quinzaine des Réalisateurs section at the 22nd Cannes Film Festival.

The film's US debut was limited and only showed at the 1968 New York Film Festival.

== Plot ==
This film follows a college student who has a routine life and who encounters a twin he is not related to. Along the way, he discovers that the twin friend has many qualities he doesn't have.

== Cast ==
- Pierre Clémenti as Giacobbe I and II
- Stefania Sandrelli as Clara
- Tina Aumont as the seller of detergent
- Sergio Tofano as Petrushka
- Ninetto Davoli as the student

== Reception ==
Pauline Kael, film critic for The New Yorker, called the film an "inventive but bewildering modernization of Dostoyevski's The Double."

On the review aggregator website Rotten Tomatoes, 91% of 11 critics' reviews are positive, with an average rating of 7.4/10.
