= Viva (actress) =

American actress and former Warhol superstar (born 1938)

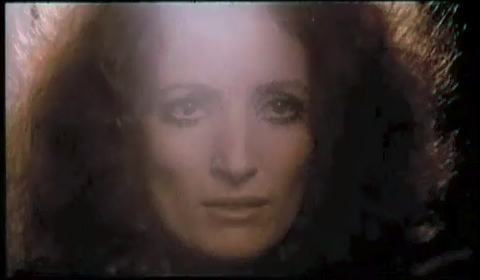
- Hoffmann in Midnight Cowboy (1969)
- Born: Janet Susan Mary Hoffmann; August 23, 1938 (age 88); Syracuse, New York, U.S.
- Other name: Susan Auder
- Occupations: Actress; writer; artist
- Years active: 1967–2010
- Spouse: Michel Auder (m. 1970, divorced)
- Children: 2, including Gaby Hoffmann

Janet Susan Mary Hoffmann (born August 23, 1938), known professionally as Viva, is an American actress, writer, and artist. She is best known for being a Warhol superstar in the 1960s. Before joining Andy Warhol's Factory scene, she was a model and painter. She starred in several of Warhol's underground films, including Tub Girls (1967), The Nude Restaurant (1967), and Blue Movie (1969). She also wrote for various publications, including The Village Voice and New York Woman.

== Early life ==
Janet Susan Mary Hoffmann was born in Syracuse, New York, the daughter of Mary Alice (née McNicholas) and Wilfred Ernest Hoffmann. She was the eldest of nine children born into a family of strict Roman Catholics. Her father was a prosperous attorney, and her parents were stalwart supporters of the Army–McCarthy hearings held to expose Communist government infiltration. The Hoffmann children were required to watch the televised proceedings. Raised in devout Catholicism, she considered becoming a nun.

== Career ==
=== Early career ===
Hoffmann began her career in entertainment as a model and painter. She retired from both professions, claiming that she believed painting to be a dead medium, and describing her time as a model as "...a period of my life I would rather forget." "When I got a little too Georgia O'Keeffe-y, I decided it was time to give it up. I was an excellent painter. I might even say I was the best painter," she said.

Her acting career began in 1967, when she was cast in the underground film Ciao! Manhattan starring Edie Sedgwick, which was not completed until 1972.

=== Andy Warhol and the Factory ===
In 1967, Hoffmann approached Andy Warhol about being in one of his films at Betsey Johnson's party. According to Warhol, they had briefly chatted a few times before this encounter. In his book Popism, Warhol recalled the night Viva approached him at the party:

She had a face that was so striking you had the choice of whether to call her beautiful or ugly. I happened to love the way she looked, and I was impressed with all the references she kept dropping to literature and politics. She talked constantly, and she had the most tiresome voice I'd ever heard—it was incredible to me that one woman’ voice could convey so much tedium. She told me that she'd just done a nude scene in a movie Chuck Wein was filming, Ciao, Manhattan, and she asked me if I was planning to do a new movie soon. I told her that we were shooting another one the following day, and I gave her the address so she could show up if she wanted to.

Warhol told her she'd have to take off her blouse for the role, so she adhered bandaids to her breasts before meeting him the next day. She showed up at the apartment where they were shooting Loves of Ondine, which was originally part of the 1967 film **** but subsequently released as a separate feature. By the time the film was released, she was using the name Viva—a name she adopted after spotting it on a package of paper towels. When Viva used her government name to write movie reviews for a local publication called Downtown, she gave herself rave reviews: "Viva! is a funny mix of Greta Garbo, Myrna Loy, and Carole Lombard…. she combines the grace of the Thirties with the catty candor… of the Sixties…."

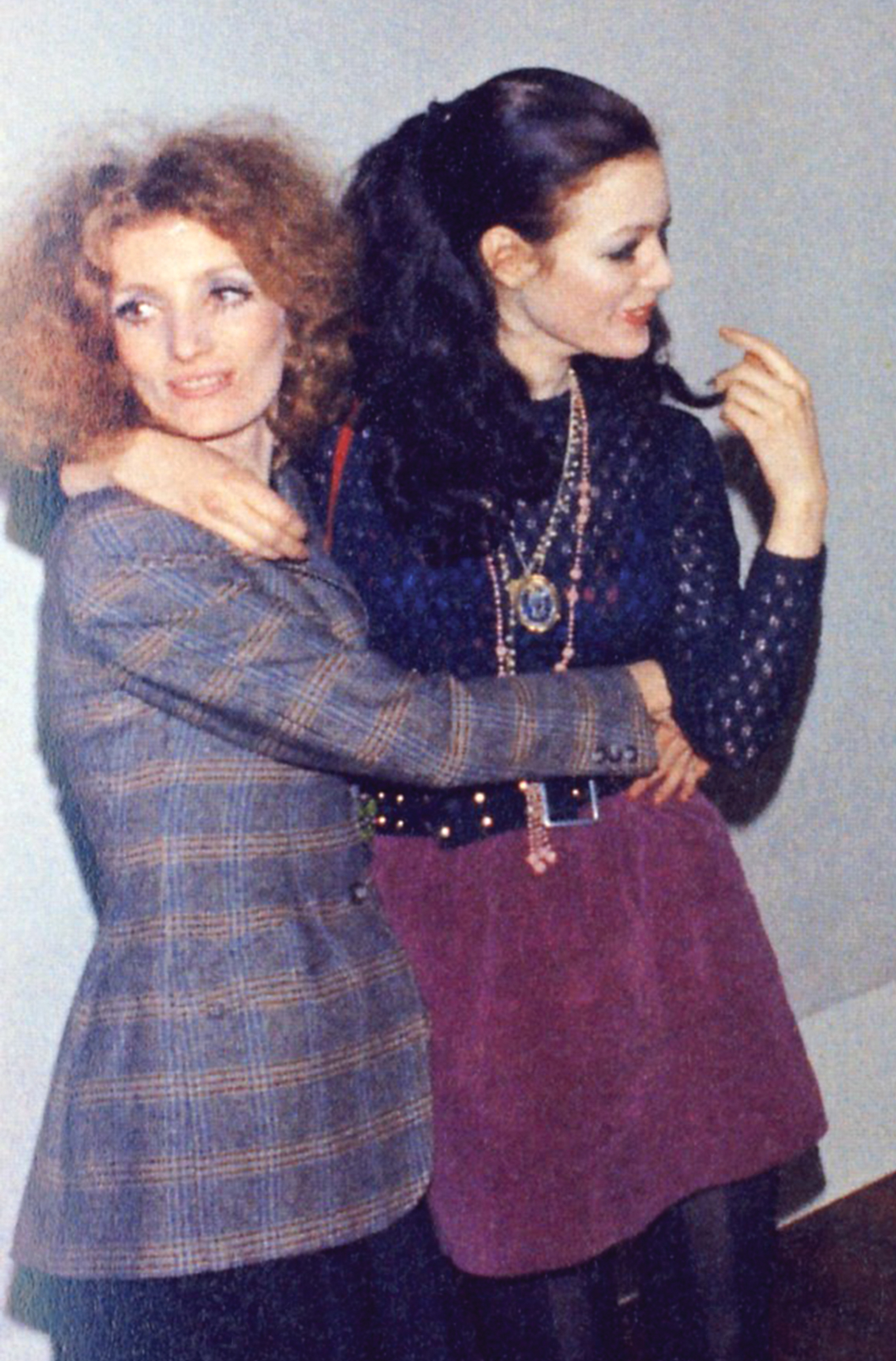
Viva and International Velvet by Billy Name at the Factory, 1968.

Warhol and the Factory crowd took a liking to Viva, and as a Warhol superstar she appeared in several other films. Tub Girls (1967), consists of Viva lying in a bathtub with various people of both sexes, including Brigid Berlin and Abigail Rosen. She appeared in Bike Boy (1967), a film about a motorcyclist trying to find himself; and The Nude Restaurant (1967), in which she played a waitress, opposite Taylor Mead.

Viva was on the phone with Andy Warhol when he was shot by Valerie Solanas in June 1968. Following the assassination attempt on Warhol's life, Viva developed a close and personal friendship with Warhol's mother, Julia Warhola. Returning from the hospital, however, Warhol accused Viva of utilizing his absence to spy on his work and his mother, creating a rift in a relationship that was never repaired. Viva never saw Mrs. Warhola again after that.

Viva appeared in Brass Bed, an unreleased film shot in a Manhattan apartment in October 1968. Running approximately 66 minutes, the film features Viva alongside Candy Darling, Geri Miller, Ultra Violet, Ann Wehrer, Vera Cruz, and several other women in a bed. According to curator Callie Angell's notes, the participants improvised conversations about relationships, celebrity, and their personal lives. The film remains unfinished and has never been publicly screened.

By far, Viva's most controversial role was in Blue Movie (1969), a seminal film in the Golden Age of Porn that helped inaugurate the "porno chic" phenomenon in modern American culture. Viva starred opposite Louis Waldon. The film consists of improvised dialogue between Viva and Waldon about a multitude of topics, including the Vietnam War, President Richard Nixon, and various mundane tasks. These conversations are interrupted by the main event of the film, in which Viva and Waldon perform sexual acts in front of the camera. The film was seized by New York City Police for obscenity, and the theater manager, projectionist and ticket-seller at the New Andy Warhol Garrick Theatre arrested for possession of obscene materials.

In 1970, Viva's book Superstar: A Novel was published by G. P. Putnam's Sons. The book was an insider's look at the Factory scene, a partly fictional autobiographical account of her time there. It was distinguished from other "tell-all" memoirs by virtue of her writing, which incorporated various stylistic effects, including the use of taped conversations. The dust jacket featured a photograph of Viva taken by Cecil Beaton. Early critical reception was overwhelmingly negative. Playboy dismissed it as "a model of scatterbrained pornography," while Gene Shalit of the Cleveland Press wrote, "I'm certain she did not write it alone. For her sake I hope she did not write it at all." Herbert Gold in the Saturday Review called it "a mere gibber of obscenity, perversion, speedsped rappings and zappings dirty, desperate and pitiable." Viva, for her part, remained undeterred: "I've had fabulous reactions from all the women who've read it," she said. "I've had fabulous reactions from all the homosexuals who've read it, and fabulous reactions from some of the men who've read it. In fact, the only people I haven’t had fabulous reactions from are those goddamned critics."

Viva interviewed Bianca Jagger for the August 1972 issue of Warhol's Interview magazine.

=== Later career ===
Viva had a bit role in John Schlesinger's film Midnight Cowboy (1969). The part was originally intended for Warhol, who passed it on to her. She appears as a filmmaker who hosts a psychedelic party.

Viva's first starring role in a non-Warhol film was in Agnès Varda's Lions Love in 1969. The film features Viva in a ménage à trois with Gerome Ragni and James Rado. She was cast as Jennifer in Woody Allen's 1972 film Play It Again, Sam.

Viva incorporated the use of video tapes into her second book The Baby. These tapes were later released by her former husband, video artist Michel Auder, as Chronicles: Family Diary in three parts. She was the narrator for Carla Bley's 1971 experimental jazz composition Escalator over the Hill. Viva was one of the early pioneers in video art.

During the 1970s, Viva was a guest participant in Shirley Clarke's Teepee Video Space Troupe, which she formed in the early 1970s.

Viva also went on to have supporting parts in films such as Richard Elfman's 1980 cult musical Forbidden Zone and Wim Wender's 1984 Independent drama Paris, Texas.

== Personal life ==
With former husband Michel Auder, Viva made and kept film diaries which included the birth of her first daughter, Alexandra (Alex) Auder in 1971. She was briefly engaged to the actor Anthony Herrera. They had one child together, actress Gaby Hoffmann, born in 1982.

In 1993, Viva was taken to housing court by the Chelsea Hotel, where she lived with her two daughters, for not paying her $920 a month rent for two years. Viva wrote a book about her daughter titled Gaby at the Chelsea, a riff on Eloise at the Plaza, as yet unpublished.

Viva lives in Hudson, NY, where she paints landscapes.

== Filmography ==
Year	Title	Role	Director	Notes
1967	The Nude Restaurant	The Waitress	Andy Warhol	Feature-length underground film
1967	Bike Boy	Girl on couch	Andy Warhol	Drama film
1967	Tub Girls	[data missing]	Andy Warhol	Avant garde film
1968	Lonesome Cowboys	Ramona D'Alvarez	Andy Warhol	
1968	San Diego Surf	Susan Hoffman		
1968	Loves of Ondine	Girl in Bed		First Warhol film role; originally part of **** (1967)
1969	Lions Love	Viva	Agnès Varda	
1969	Blue Movie	Girl in Bed	Andy Warhol	
1969	Sam's Song	Girl with the Hourglass		
1969	Midnight Cowboy	Gretel McAlbertson (the Warhol-like The Factory party giver)		Drama film
1969	Keeping Busy	[data missing]		
1969	Trapianto, consunzione e morte di Franco Brocani	[data missing]		
1970	Necropolis	Viva Auder (Countess Bathory)	Franco Brocani	
1970	Cleopatra	Cleopatra		
1972	Play It Again, Sam	Jennifer		
1972	Ciao! Manhattan	Diana (Vogue editor)		Filmed in 1967
1972	Cisco Pike	Merna		
1979	New Old	[data missing]		
1979	Seduction of Patrick	[data missing]		Short film
1980	Flash Gordon	Cytherian Girl		
1982	The State of Things	Kate		
1982	Forbidden Zone	Ex-queen		
1984	Paris, Texas	Viva Auder (woman on TV)	Wim Wenders	
1993	The Man Without a Face	Mrs. Cooper		
2008	The Feature	Viva (as a Warhol superstar)		
2010	News From Nowhere	Viva		

== Books ==
- Superstar (1970)
- The Baby (1974)
- Leaving the Chelsea with Egg (2017)
