= Lonesome Cowboys =

1968 film

- 1974 German re-release poster
- Directed by: Andy Warhol
- Written by: Paul Morrissey
- Produced by: Paul Morrissey
- Starring: Joe Dallesandro; Eric Emerson; Taylor Mead; Viva; Julian Burroughs
- Cinematography: Paul Morrissey
- Edited by: Paul Morrissey
- Distributed by: Sherpix
- Release dates: November 1968 (SFIFF); May 5, 1969 (New York City)
- Running time: 109 minutes
- Country: United States
- Language: English
- Budget: $3,000

Lonesome Cowboys is a 1968 American Western drama film directed by Andy Warhol, and written and produced by Paul Morrissey. A satire of Hollywood Westerns, it was initially screened in November 1968 at the San Francisco International Film Festival, where it won the Best Film Award. On May 5, 1969, it was shown for initial viewings at the New Andy Warhol Garrick Theatre in New York City.

== Production ==
Lonesome Cowboys was shot in January 1968 in Old Tucson and the Rancho Linda Vista Dude Ranch in Oracle, Arizona on a budget of $3,000 (equivalent to $27,800 in 2025). The film features Warhol superstars Viva, Taylor Mead, Louis Waldon, Eric Emerson, and Joe Dallesandro. The plot loosely is based on Romeo and Juliet, hence the names Julian and Ramona of the two leads. While in Arizona on a college lecture tour in November 1967, Warhol booked film screenings of excerpts from Chelsea Girls followed by a question-and-answer session with the artist, Morrissey, Viva, and Allen Midgette at Arizona State University and the Cinema I Film Society at the Tucson Jewish Community Center. Warhol and Viva apparently both enjoyed their time in Arizona so much that they made plans to find a way to return, which culminated in Paul Morrissey's writing the screenplay for Lonesome Cowboys to be shot there two months later. A detailed first-hand account of Warhol's time in Tucson by Cinema I director Shirley Pasternack was published in the May 1989 issue of Tucson City Magazine.

The film was shot on 16 mm film using an Auricon camera, recording the sound directly onto the film ("single-system"). Warhol deliberately stopped and started the camera during takes to include flash frames and audio pops in the middle of shots.

Warhol initially planned to title the film Fuck, then The Glory of the Fuck. Warhol and Morrissey settled on Lonesome Cowboys while Warhol was convalescing following the attempt on his life by Valerie Solanas. John Schlesinger was filming Midnight Cowboy, which featured several members of Warhol's entourage, including Viva and Ultra Violet who, with Morrissey, shot a separate short film during shooting of Midnight Cowboy's elaborate party scene. Warhol initially endorsed the participation of his people but grew resentful at what he perceived as Schlesinger's poaching of Warhol's scene. Warhol decided to undercut Schlesinger by naming this film Lonesome Cowboys as a reference to Midnight Cowboy. The original poster promoting the film, designed by George Abagnalo, is shown prominently in a portrait of Warhol by Jack Mitchell.

== Cast ==
- Joe Dallesandro as Joe "Little Joe"
- Julian Burroughs as Brother
- Eric Emerson as Eric
- Tom Hompertz as Julian
- Taylor Mead as Nurse
- Viva as Ramona D'Alvarez
- Louis Waldon as Mickey
- Francis Francine as Sheriff

== 1969 Atlanta police raid ==
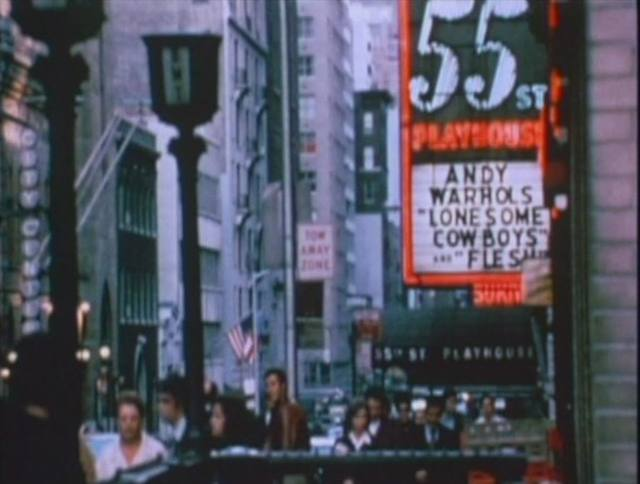
Lonesome Cowboys and Flesh (another Warhol–Morrissey collaboration) playing at the 55th Street Playhouse in New York City

In August 1969, the film was seized by police in Atlanta, Georgia, personnel at The Ansley Mall Mini Cinema were arrested, and the entire audience was searched by police for their identifications. The event was considered a turning point in the city's LGBT community and led to the first Atlanta Pride two years later.

== Remakes ==
A 2010 remake by Marianne Dissard titled Lonesome Cowgirls was shot in Tucson, Arizona.

== See also ==
- Andy Warhol filmography
- List of American films of 1968
