= David Allyn =

American director

- Born: April 30, 1969 (age 57)
- Education: Georgetown Day School, Brown University (BA), Harvard University (PhD)
- Occupations: Author, Educator, Consultant

David Allyn (born April 30, 1969) is an American author, educator, and consultant to nonprofit organizations.

== Personal life ==
Allyn is the stepson of the late John Wallach, founder of the nonprofit organization Seeds of Peace. Allyn graduated from the Georgetown Day School in Washington, D.C. He holds a BA from Brown University and a PhD from Harvard University. From 1996–1999, he taught at Princeton University. In 2014 he was named CEO of The Oliver Scholars Program. In February 2016 he was elected to the board of trustees of the National Association of Independent Schools (NAIS).

== Books and articles ==
Allyn is the author of four books, including Make Love, Not War and I Can't Believe I Just Did That, and has served as a faculty member at Princeton University and a visiting scholar at Columbia University at the Institute for Social and Economic Research and Policy. His essays have appeared in The New York Times Magazine and other publications. While an undergraduate at Brown University, Allyn co-authored a book on transferring from one college to another. He and his co-author (later wife) were profiled in The Washington Post and featured on CNN. He has also published articles in Nonprofit and Voluntary Sector Quarterly, The Journal of American Studies, Teachers College Record, The Advocate, The Washington Post, The New York Daily News, The Boston Globe and The San Francisco Chronicle. As an expert on the 1960s, Allyn has appeared on Vh1, The History Channel, and CNN.

== Plays ==
Allyn's play, Buying In, was a semi-finalist for the 2017 Eugene O'Neill National Playwrights Conference. His play, Commencement, was selected for the Baltimore Playwrights Festival. and won a Writer's Digest award. His play Punctuated Equilibrium received a staged reading by the Hangar Theatre Lab in Ithaca, New York. His play Writers Colony appeared in the Fresh Fruit Festival in New York City, and Baptizing Adam won the James H. Wilson Award for Best-Full Length Play. According to The New York Times, Allyn is "a wicked observer of self-conscious people at their less than best."

== Concepts ==
Allyn's original concepts include "strategic empathy," denoting the deliberate use of perspective-taking to achieve certain desired ends; "mission mirroring," the phenomenon that occurs when mission-based organizations become plagued by the very problems they were created to solve; and "sexual optimism (pessimism)," the view of human sexuality as benign (or dangerous).
