= Garrick Cinema =

Former theater in Manhattan, New York

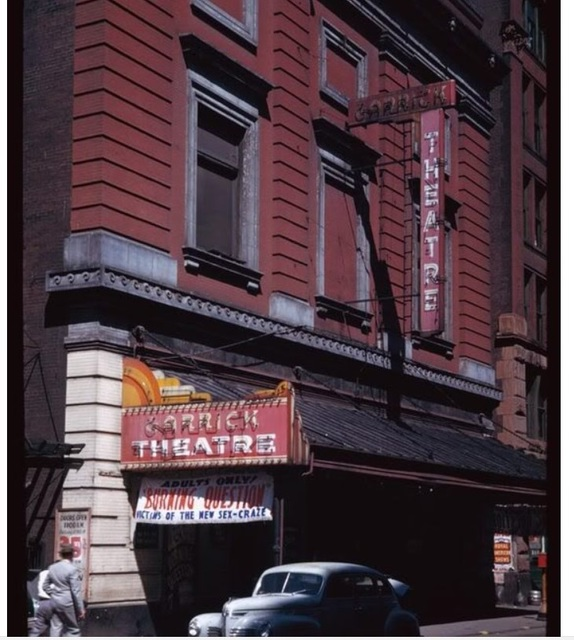
- Vintage image of the theater (New Andy Warhol Garrick Theatre)

General information
- Architectural style: Late 19th and early 20th century American movements, other
- Location: 152 Bleecker Street; New York, NY 10012
- Coordinates: 40.7282°N 73.9994°W

The Garrick Cinema (periodically referred to as the New Andy Warhol Garrick Theatre, Andy Warhol's Garrick Cinema, Garrick Theatre, or Nickelodeon) was a 199-seat movie house (Note: Cinema Treasures lists the theater's capacity as 299 seats.) at 152 Bleecker Street in the Greenwich Village neighborhood of Lower Manhattan in New York City. Andy Warhol debuted many of his notable films in this building in the late 1960s.

The Cafe Au Go Go was located in the basement of the theater building in the late 1960s, and was a prominent Greenwich Village night club, featuring many well known musical groups, folksingers and comedy acts. The building was demolished in the 1970s.

== Warhol years ==
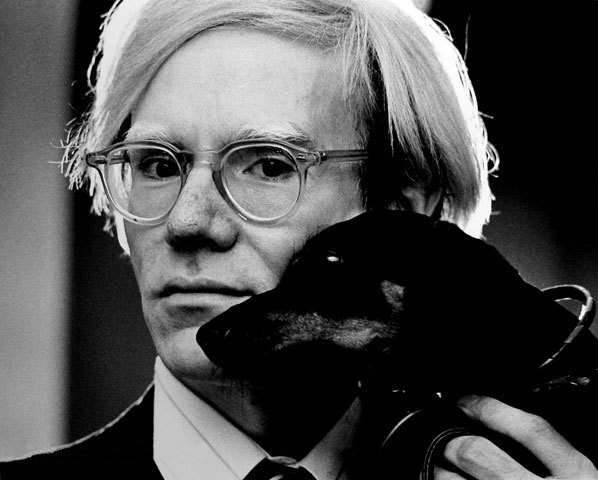
Andy Warhol

As an advertisement illustrator in the 1950s, Warhol used assistants to increase his productivity. Collaboration would remain a defining (and controversial) aspect of his working methods throughout his career; this was particularly true in the 1960s. One of the most important collaborators during this period was Gerard Malanga. Malanga assisted the artist with the production of silkscreens, films, sculpture, and other works at "The Factory", Warhol's aluminum foil-and-silver-paint-lined studio on 47th Street (later moved to Broadway). Other members of Warhol's Factory crowd included Freddie Herko, Ondine, Ronald Tavel, Mary Woronov, Billy Name, and Brigid Berlin (from whom he apparently got the idea to tape-record his phone conversations).

During the 1960s, Andy Warhol groomed a retinue of bohemian and counterculture eccentrics upon whom he bestowed the designation "superstars", including Nico, Joe Dallesandro, Edie Sedgwick, Viva, Ultra Violet, Holly Woodlawn, Jackie Curtis, and Candy Darling. These people all participated in the Factory films, and some—like Berlin—remained friends with Warhol until his death. Important figures in the New York underground art/cinema world, such as poet John Giorno and film-maker Jack Smith, also appear in Warhol films (many premiering at the New Andy Warhol Garrick Theatre or the 55th Street Playhouse) of the 1960s, revealing Warhol's connections to a diverse range of artistic scenes during this time. Less well known was his support and collaboration with several teen-agers during this era, who would achieve prominence later in life including writer David Dalton, photographer Stephen Shore and artist Bibbe Hansen (mother of pop musician Beck).

Andy Warhol debuted many of his notable films (including Blue Movie (1969), Flesh (1968), Lonesome Cowboys (1968), Loves of Ondine (1967) and others) in the Garrick Cinema building (as well as in other area theaters, including the 55th Street Playhouse) in the late 1960s. To note, Bike Boy premiered at the Hudson Theatre on October 5, 1967, not at the Garrick; an expanded version opened at the Garrick in July 1968.

== The Frank Zappa Gig ==
Frank Zappa and the Mothers of Invention played here nightly for 6 months in 1967. Faced with a lack of venues in his native Los Angeles, Frank Zappa booked a series of shows at downtown New York's Balloon Farm in November 1966 then returned to play at the Garrick, the narrow, 199 seat, performance space/cinema above the Cafe Au Go Go. The Balloon Farm at 23 St. Marks Place, actually on 7th Street off of Third Avenue/The Bowery, started with a four night engagement Wednesday through Saturday, November 23–26, 1966. Herb Cohen, Zappa's manager who had booked gigs at coffee bars and pubs in the 1950s, helped Zappa to rent the Garrick, first during the Easter period Thursday 23 March to Monday 3 April 1967 and then from the Summer to September 5, 1967. The Mothers' show, entitled "Pigs & Repugnant," evolved into extended musical pieces interspersed with Dada and vaudevillian theatrics. Officially, the gig was a live presentation of their second album, Absolutely Free, on Verve Records.

Opening acts for the Easter shows were Tim Buckley (23-29 March), Richie Havens (March 30–31 and April 1–3, then through May The Joe Beck Jazz Ensemble. During the month of June Eric Andersen and Luke and The Apostles were the opening acts and finally, during July, Meredith Monk performed with Don Preston backing her.

== Cafe Au Go Go ==
The Cafe Au Go Go was a Greenwich Village night club located in the basement of the New Andy Warhol Garrick Theatre at 152 Bleecker Street. The club featured many well known musical groups, folksingers and comedy acts between the opening in February 1964 until closing in October 1969. The club was originally owned by Howard Solomon who sold it in June 1969 to Moses Baruch. Baruch closed the club in October 1969. Howard Solomon became the manager of singer Fred Neil.

The club was the first New York City venue for the Grateful Dead. Richie Havens and the Blues Project were weekly regulars as well as Harvey Brooks who was bass player in residence, The Stone Poneys featuring Linda Ronstadt played frequently. The Grateful Dead played 10 times in 1967 and 3 in 1969. Jimi Hendrix sat in with blues harp player James Cotton there in 1968. Van Morrison, Tim Hardin, Tim Buckley, Joni Mitchell, Judy Collins, Howlin' Wolf, Muddy Waters, John Lee Hooker, Oscar Brown Jr., the Youngbloods, the Siegel-Schwall Band, John Hammond Jr., The Paul Butterfield Blues Band, Michael Bloomfield, Jefferson Airplane, Cream, The Chambers Brothers, Canned Heat, The Fugs, Odetta, Country Joe and the Fish, The Yardbirds, The Doors all played there. Blues legends Lightnin' Hopkins, Son House, Skip James, Bukka White, and Big Joe Williams performed at the club after being "rediscovered" in the '60s. Before many rock groups began performing there, the Au Go Go was an oasis for jazz (Bill Evans, Stan Getz), comedy (Lenny Bruce, George Carlin), and folk music.

== Current use ==
The Garrick Cinema and related Cafe Au Go Go buildings were demolished in the 1970s, and the location, at 152 Bleecker Street, was used for a mid-rise apartment building with a Capital One Bank branch at ground level, which are the current buildings (as of September 2017), according to Google Maps.

== See also ==
- Bleecker Street Cinema – nearby at 144 Bleecker Street (1960–1991)
- 55th Street Playhouse – another theater showing Warhol films
- Golden Age of Porn (1969–1984)
- List of New York City Designated Landmarks in Manhattan from 14th to 59th Streets
- National Register of Historic Places listings in New York County, New York
- The Factory – several blocks north of Garrick Cinema
