= Blue Movie =

1969 film by Andy Warhol

- Theatrical release poster
- Directed by: Andy Warhol
- Written by: Andy Warhol
- Produced by: Andy Warhol
- Starring: Viva; Louis Waldon
- Cinematography: Andy Warhol
- Production company: Andy Warhol Films
- Distributed by: Andy Warhol Films
- Release date: June 12, 1969
- Running time: 105 minutes
- Country: United States
- Language: English
- Budget: $3,000

Blue Movie (also known as Fuck) is a 1969 American erotic film written, produced and directed by Andy Warhol. It is the first adult erotic film depicting unsimulated sex to receive wide theatrical release in the United States, and is regarded as a seminal film in the Golden Age of Porn (1969–1984). The film stars Warhol superstars Viva and Louis Waldon.

Blue Movie was released at the Elgin Theater in New York City on June 12, 1969, before the legalization of pornography in Denmark on July 1, 1969. The film helped inaugurate the "porno chic" phenomenon, in which porn was publicly discussed by celebrities (like Johnny Carson and Bob Hope) and taken seriously by film critics (like Roger Ebert), in modern American society, and shortly thereafter, in many other countries throughout the world. According to Warhol, Blue Movie was a major influence in the making of Last Tango in Paris (1972), an internationally controversial erotic drama film starring Marlon Brando.

In 2016, Blue Movie was shown at the Whitney Museum of American Art in New York City.

== Synopsis ==
The film includes dialogue about the Vietnam War, various mundane tasks, sexual intercourse, and outercourse, during a blissful afternoon in a New York City apartment. The film was presented in the press as, "a film about the Vietnam War and what we can do about it." Warhol added, "the movie is about ... love, not destruction."

== Cast ==
- Louis Waldon as Himself
- Viva as Herself

== Production ==
Andy Warhol produced, photographed, and directed Blue Movie, with sound by his boyfriend Jed Johnson and Paul Morrissey as executive producer. The film was shot in the New York City apartment of art critic David Bourdon. Warhol described the film as an attempt to make a work centered entirely on sexual activity, in the manner of his earlier experimental films: "I'd always wanted to do a movie that was pure fucking, nothing else, the way Eat had been just eating and Sleep had been just sleeping. So in October '68 I shot a movie of Viva having sex with Louis Waldon. I called it just Fuck."

The film was reportedly shot in a single three-hour session. Approximately 30 minutes were initially cut from the 140-minute version, while the climactic sequence was filmed in a continuous 35-minute take. Variety reported that approximately ten minutes of the film consisted of actual sexual activity.

Warhol's approach to filmmaking was deliberately observational and largely unscripted. In an interview with Leticia Kent for Vogue, he explained that he found conventional narrative structures restrictive and preferred films that allowed viewers to observe events as they unfolded:

Scripts bore me. It's much more exciting not to know what's going to happen. I don't think that plot is important. If you see a movie of two people talking, you can watch it over and over again without being bored. You get involved – you miss things – you come back to it … But you can't see the same movie over again if it has a plot because you already know the ending … Everyone is rich. Everyone is interesting. Years ago, people used to sit looking out of their windows at the street. Or on a park bench. They would stay for hours without being bored although nothing much was going on. This is my favorite theme in movie making – just watching something happening for two hours or so.

The film's distinctive blue and green coloration resulted from an accident involving the film stock. Warhol used stock intended for filming under tungsten lighting, while daylight entered the apartment through a large window, causing the middle reel to turn blue. Wheeler Winston Dixon, a filmmaker and scholar who attended the film's first screening at the Factory in spring 1969, recalled hearing Warhol ask why the entire second reel had turned blue. Dixon explained the technical cause, after which Warhol reportedly responded, "Ohhhhhhh," followed by a long pause, before concluding, "Well, I guess we should call it Blue Movie."

== Release ==
The film had a benefit screening on June 12, 1969, at the Elgin Theater in New York City.

While it was initially shown at The Factory, Blue Movie was not presented to a wider audience until it opened at the New Andy Warhol Garrick Theater in New York City on July 21, 1969, with a running time of 105 minutes. On its opening day in New York, the film grossed a house record $3,050, with a total of $16,200 for the week. Warhol received 90% of the gross, which recovered the film's $3,000 cost quickly.

The film was also screened at the Berkeley Repertory Theatre in California.

== Reception ==
Variety reported that Blue Movie was the "first theatrical feature to actually depict intercourse". Writing in The New York Times, film critic Vincent Canby reported that "in its crucial moments, it's just as cold and mechanical as any conventional blue movie" and "I don't think it will enrich one's consciousness." Jonas Mekas wrote in The Village Voice that the film "has both aesthetic (humanistic) and social redeeming qualities," and noted that "there is poetry [and] ethnography."

Journalist Dennis Cipnic praised the movie and Warhol's filming technique in Infinity, the magazine of the American Society of Magazine Photographers. "The sex in 'Blue Movie' is, in fact, quite charming and a great deal more artistic than the embarrassingly phony gropings of panting actors which predominate in most commercial films," he said. Critic John Huddy of the Miami Herald, who didn't like the movie, wrote "Cipnic should win a Pulitzer Prize for comedy—the most elaborate, best sounding justification for utter slop I've ever read."

Viva, in Paris, finding that Blue Movie was getting much attention, said, "Timothy Leary loved it. Gene Youngblood [an LA film critic] did too. He said I was better than Vanessa Redgrave and it was the first time a real movie star had made love on the screen. It was a real breakthrough."

=== Controversy and arrests in Greenwich Village ===
On July 31, 1969, the staff of the New Andy Warhol Garrick Theatre in Greenwich Village were arrested, and the film confiscated. In September 1969, a criminal court ruled that the film is "hardcore pornography" and the theater manager was fined $250. Afterwards, the manager said, "I don't think anyone was harmed by this movie ... I saw other pictures around town and this was a kiddie matinee compared to them." In reaction to the controversy, Warhol stated, "What's pornography anyway? ...The muscle magazines are called pornography, but they're really not. They teach you how to have good bodies ... Blue Movie was real. But it wasn't done as pornography—it was done as an exercise, an experiment. But I really do think movies should arouse you, should get you excited about people, should be prurient."

== Legacy ==
In 1970, Warhol published Blue Movie in book form, with film dialogue and explicit stills, through Grove Press.

In 2005, Blue Movie was publicly screened in New York City for the first time in over 30 years. In 2016, the film was shown at the Whitney Museum of American Art in Manhattan.

=== Influence ===
When Last Tango in Paris, an internationally controversial erotic drama film directed by Bernardo Bertolucci and starring Marlon Brando, was released in 1972, Warhol considered Blue Movie to be its inspiration.

Mona the Virgin Nymph, an erotic film depicting explicit sex, also received a mainstream theatrical release in the United States in 1970. Shortly thereafter, other adult films, such as Boys in the Sand, Deep Throat, Behind the Green Door, The Devil in Miss Jones, and The Opening of Misty Beethoven were released, continuing the Golden Age of Porn that began with Blue Movie. In 1973, the phenomenon of porn being publicly discussed by celebrities (like Johnny Carson and Bob Hope) and taken seriously by film critics (like Roger Ebert), a development referred to by Ralph Blumenthal of The New York Times as "porno chic", began for the first time in modern American culture and later throughout the world.

== See also ==
- Andy Warhol filmography
- Kiss
- Blow Job
- Erotic films in the United States
- Golden Age of Porn
- Sex in film
