= Make Love, Not War =

2001 book by David Allyn

Make Love, Not War: The Sexual Revolution: An Unfettered History
- Author: David Allyn
- Language: English
- Subject: History of human sexuality
- Publication date: 2001
- Media type: Print
- ISBN: 0-316-03930-6
- Dewey Decimal: 306.70973
- LC Class: HQ18.U5 A38 2001

Make Love, Not War: The Sexual Revolution: An Unfettered History is a 2001 book by David Allyn.

== Summary ==
Allyn documents the history of sexual revolution that took place in the United States in the 1960s. The name references the popular 1960s counterculture anti-war slogan "Make love, not war".
