= Alexandra Auder =

American actress and yoga instructor

Alexandra Auder is an American actress and yoga instructor.

She is the daughter of Viva, an actress, writer, and former Warhol superstar.

In 2023, she published Don't Call Me Home: A Memoir. The book details her life in the Chelsea Hotel during her childhood and adolescence, where she lived with her mother and sister, Gaby Hoffman.
