= Louis Waldon =

American actor

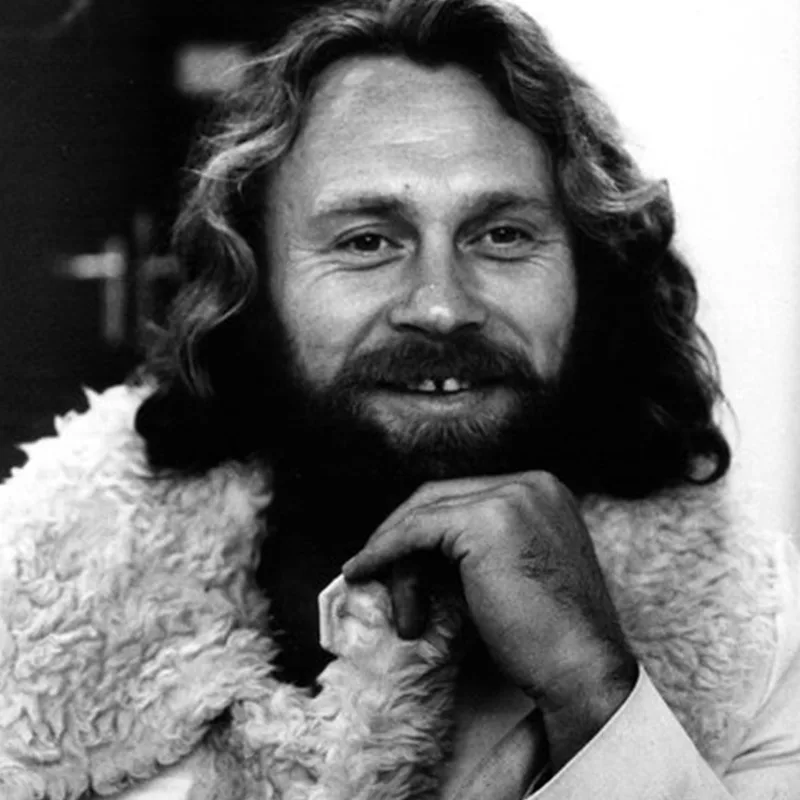
- Born: December 16, 1934; Modesto, California, U.S.
- Died: December 6, 2013 (aged 78); Los Angeles, California, U.S.
- Occupations: Film actor, artist
- Years active: 1965–2009

Louis Waldon (December 16, 1934 – December 6, 2013) was an American film actor, whose career spanned nearly 45 years. He was born in Modesto, California.

== Career ==
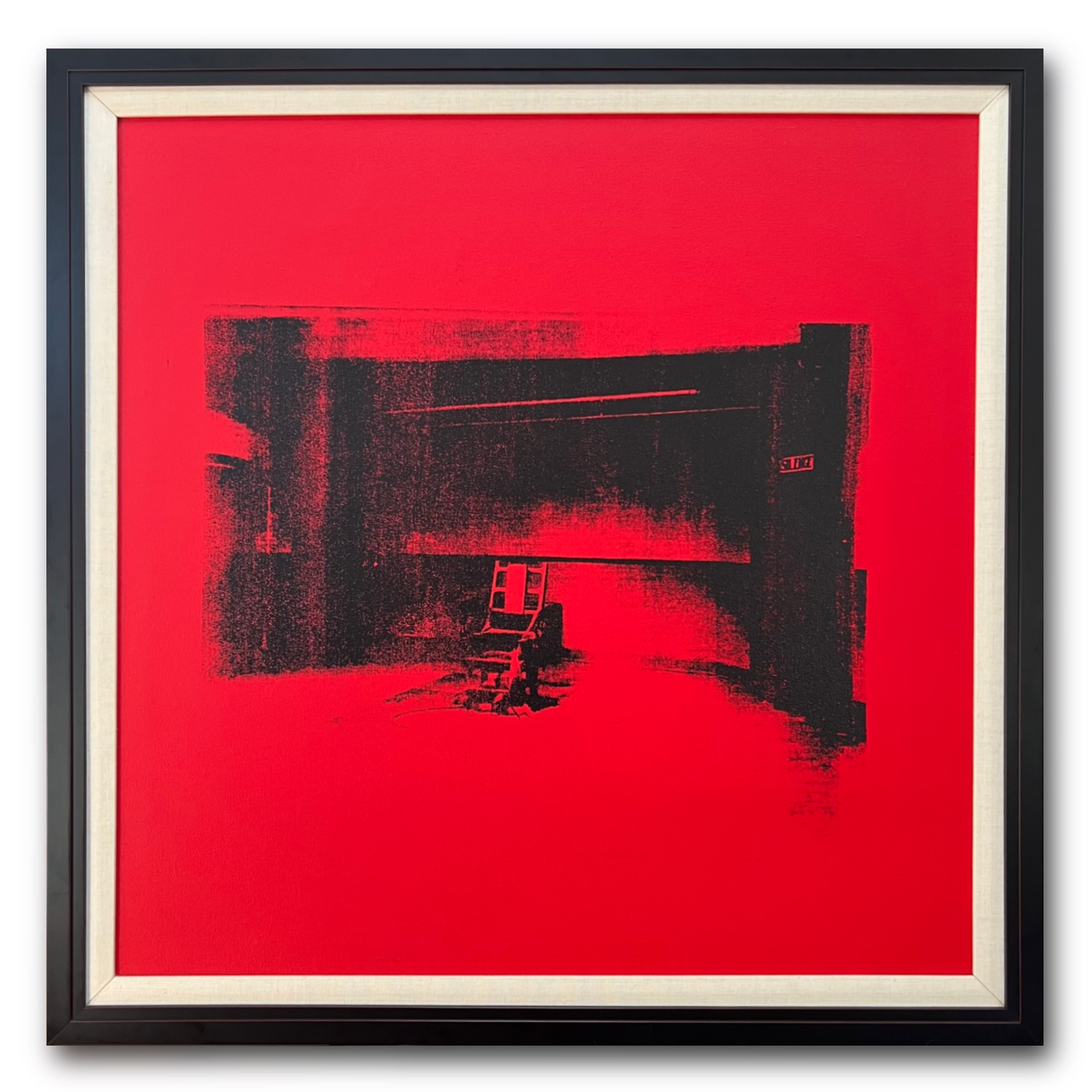
Electric Chair in Red. Louis Waldon 1998 currently in the Johnny Blanco Art Collection

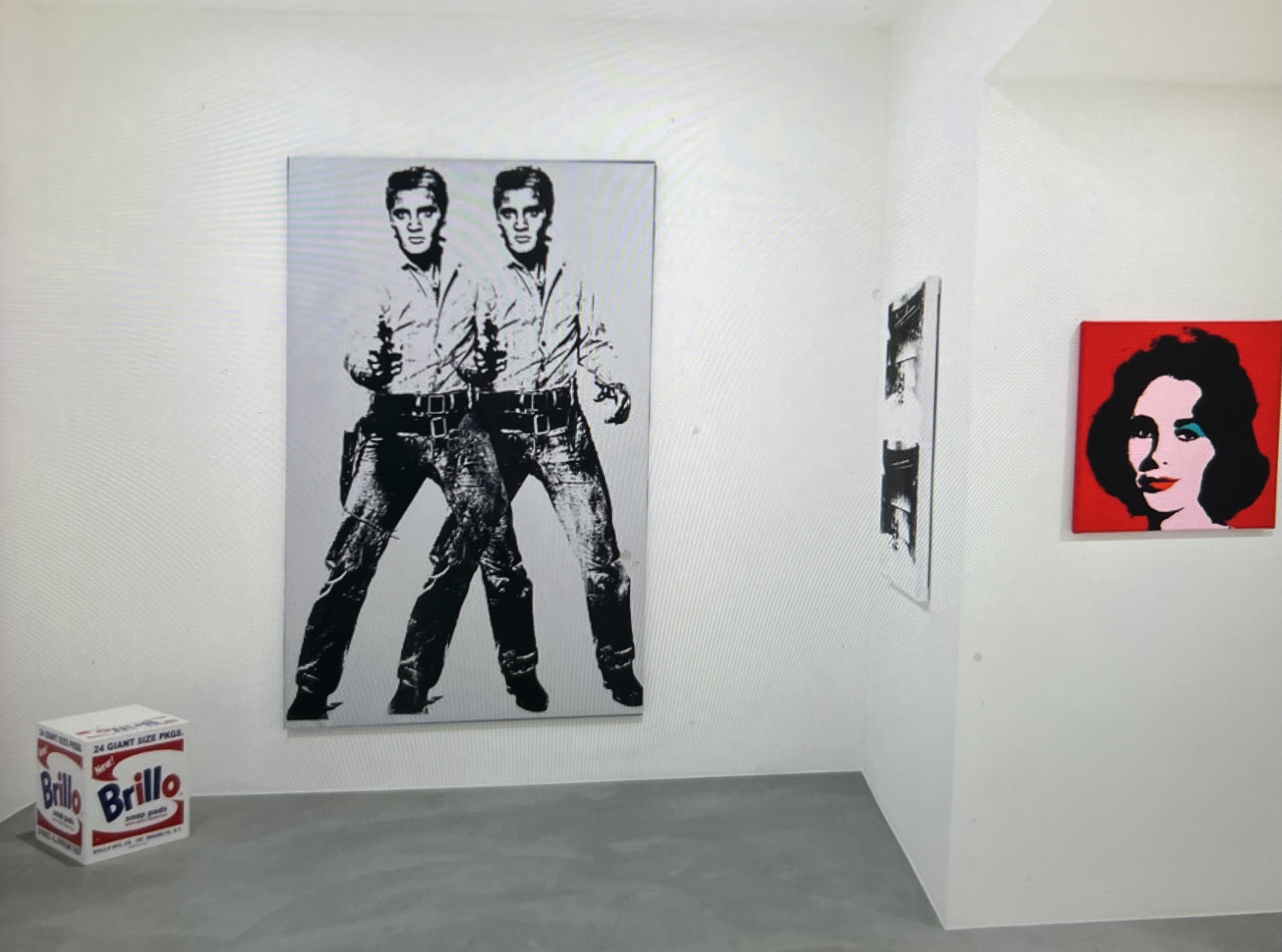
Double Elvis by Louis Waldon, Kantor Gallery Exhibition 2021

Waldon began his acting career in 1965. He was best known for his collaboration with American artist and film director Andy Warhol, and as one of the Warhol superstars, appeared in several of Warhol's films, including The Nude Restaurant (1967), Lonesome Cowboys (1968), Flesh (1968), and Blue Movie (1969), a seminal film in the Golden Age of Porn. He also appeared in a minor role in the film Mask (1985).

He was friends with fellow Andy Warhol actor Waldo Díaz-Balart.

Waldon's art career began in 1979 when he showed a friend some of Andy Warhol's original screens (the material used to create the iconic pop art) that he had acquired. Waldon's friend asked him to create an Electric Chair piece for him.

Waldon's artworks have been shown at many museums and galleries, including Chamberlain Gallery in Los Angeles (owned by Angus Chamberlain, son of sculptor John Chamberlain) and in June 2023 at the Kantor Gallery in Beverly Hills, with one of his paintings of Marlon Brando selling to a collector for almost a million dollars. The collector later attempted to have the painting added to the catalogue as an authentic Warhol.

Waldon once said, "I'll tell you one thing, if you could make any money on your own with Andy, he never said a word. He was totally helpful that way. If you wanna do something and you were going to make some money, he certainly wouldn't stand in your way."

Waldon died following a stroke on December 6, 2013, aged 78, in Los Angeles, California.

== Selected filmography ==
- The Nude Restaurant (1967)
- Lonesome Cowboys (1968)
- Flesh (1968)
- Blue Movie (1969)
- Necropolis (1970)
- Lenz (1971, based on Georg Büchner's Lenz)
- Jaider, der einsame Jäger (1971)
- Vampira (1971, TV film)
- Pan (1973)
- Dream City (1973)
- Inki (1973)`
- Sunset People (1984)
- Mask (1985)

== Quotes ==
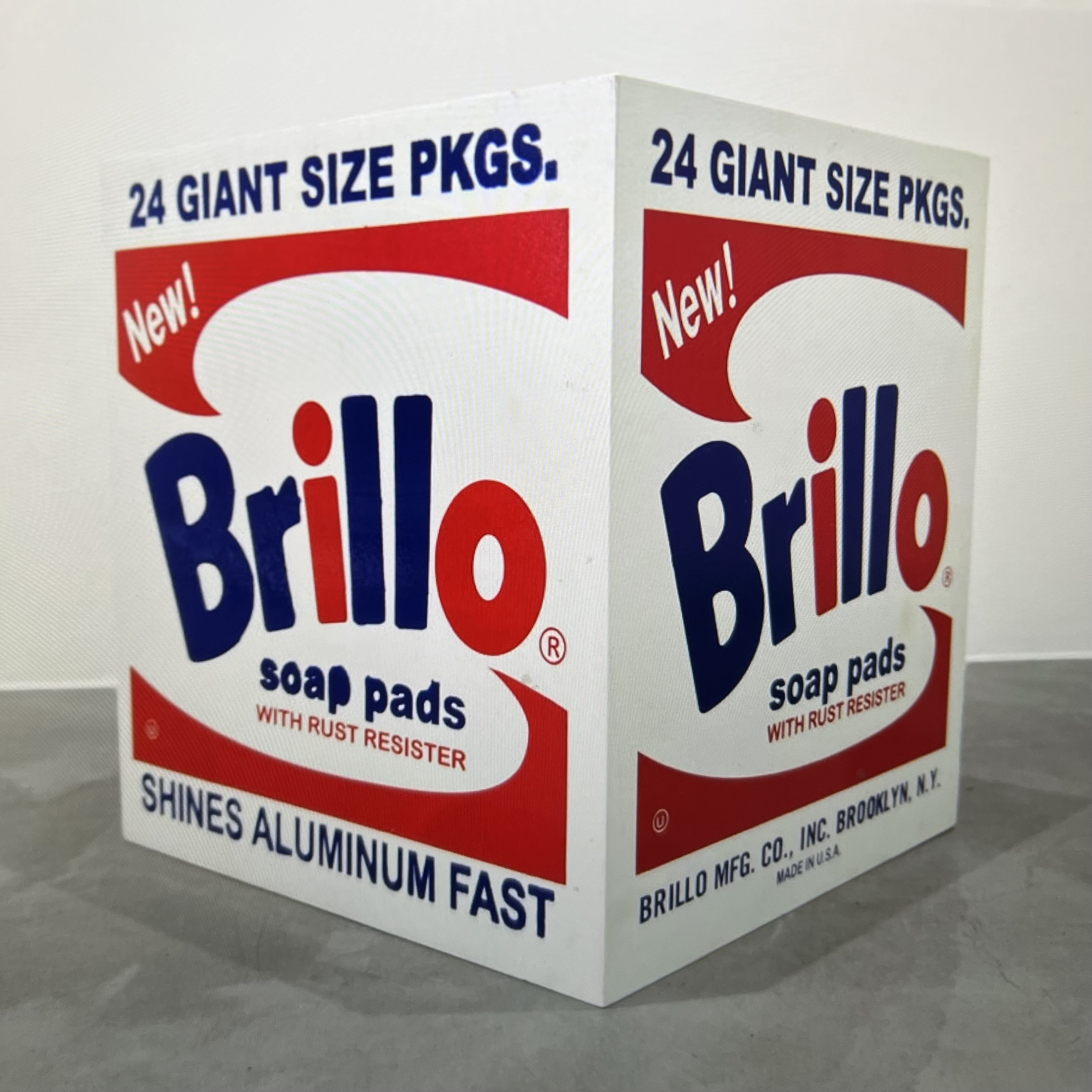
Brillo Box by Louis Waldon. Kantor Gallery, Beverly Hills

When speaking about his silkscreen artworks compared to Andy Warhol's, "They look better. Andy didn't really know what he was doing. You can't tell the difference."

Waldon rationalizes his art. "I'll tell you one thing, if you could make any money on your own with Andy, he never said a word. He was totally helpful that way. If you wanna do something and you were going to make some money, he certainly wouldn't stand in your way."

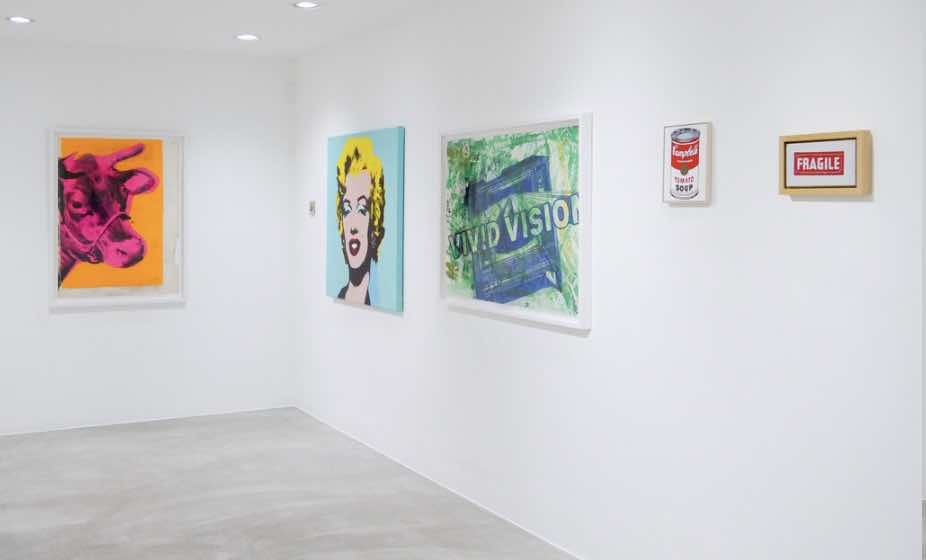
"Warhol or Not?" 2023 exhibition at Kantor Gallery, Beverly Hills. Featuring artworks by Louis Waldon
