= The Factory =

Andy Warhol's New York City studio

- Location: 158 Madison Avenue; Manhattan, New York; U.S.
- Operator: Andy Warhol
- Type: Art studio

The Factory was the studio of American artist Andy Warhol in New York City. It was the center of his artistic, social, and filmmaking activities from 1964 to 1987. Originally located at 231 East 47th Street, the first studio became known as the "Silver Factory" because its walls were painted silver and covered in aluminum foil. The Factory became known for its distinctive blend of art production, experimental film, and music. It served as a gathering place for a wide circle of artists, musicians, writers, and underground personalities—collectively known as Warhol superstars—who contributed to the studio's reputation as one of the most influential creative hubs of its era.

In the late 1960s, the Factory relocated to 33 Union Square and evolved into a more streamlined operation focused on film production, while also serving as the headquarters of Interview magazine. During the 1970s, Warhol expanded production of his paintings, increasingly specializing in commissioned portraits of celebrities and wealthy patrons. By the time the Factory moved to 860 Broadway, it had transformed from an underground countercultural hangout into a sophisticated salon where Warhol entertained a rotating cast of celebrities, fashion figures, and socialites—many of whom were also prospective clients. In the 1980s, the Factory relocated once more, this time to 158 Madison Avenue, to accommodate Warhol’s growing business ventures in television and publishing.

== History ==
=== 1960–1964: Early studios ===
In 1960, commercial artist Andy Warhol purchased a townhouse at 1342 Lexington Avenue in the Carnegie Hill neighborhood of Manhattan, which he also used as his art studio. Warhol shifted towards working as a Pop artist, and due to the mess his work was causing at home, Warhol wanted to find a studio where he could paint. A friend of his found an old unoccupied firehouse on 159 East 87th Street, where Warhol began working in January 1963. No one was eager to go there, so the rent was $150 a month. Later that year, Warhol was informed that the building would have to be vacated soon.

=== 1964–1968: 231 East 47th Street ===
In November 1963, Warhol found another loft on the fifth floor at 231 East 47th Street in Midtown Manhattan, which would become the first Factory. Around this time, artist Ray Johnson introduced Warhol to a "haircutting party" at Billy Linich's apartment, decorated with tin foil and silver paint, prompting Warhol to adopt a similar scheme for the loft. By January 1964, Warhol had moved his studio to the new loft, an unlit, industrial space lacking the typical features of artists' studios. The previous tenant, a hat manufacturer, had removed all electrical fixtures, leaving wires hanging from the ceiling and a dirty gray concrete floor.

In early 1964, Linich began transforming the space, installing wiring and powerful floodlights and covering the interior—including the elevator—in silver, leading to its nickname, the Silver Factory. Always with a camera, he became the Factory's unofficial photographer; according to one account, when Warhol first turned to filmmaking, he handed Linich his Pentax SLR, saying, "Billy, you do the photography now, because I'm going to do movies." Linich became Billy Name and documented the scene extensively, capturing its personalities and daily activity. He took up residence in the loft's rear corner, where he lived and worked for the next four years. Two cats, Black Lace and White Pussy, also lived at the Factory.

Billy Name brought in a red couch that he found on the sidewalk, which became a prominent furnishing at the Factory. The sofa quickly became a favorite place for Factory guests to crash overnight. It was featured in many photographs and films from the Silver era, including Blow Job (1964) and Couch (1964). During the move in 1968, the couch was stolen while left unattended on the sidewalk for a short time.

During these years, amphetamine use was widespread at the Factory and was later described by Warhol as a driving force behind much of its creative activity. While some participants used it only occasionally, others, including Billy Name, used it daily. The most intensive users, such as Ondine and Brigid Polk, injected amphetamines, a practice associated with the Factory's more extreme drug culture. Although amphetamines were not yet widely regarded as dangerous, those devoted to their recreational use were often associated with the social margins of the era.

Warhol achieved a reputation for his large output of work with assistants, paid and volunteers, and sometimes friends who dropped by the Factory helped. He used silkscreens so that he could mass-produce images the way corporations mass-produced consumer goods. He attracted a ménage of poets, drag queens, socialites, musicians, and free-thinkers who became known as the Warhol Superstars. They starred in his films and created the atmosphere for which the Factory became legendary. Musician John Cale later recalled, "It wasn't called the Factory for nothing. It was where the assembly line for the silkscreens happened. While one person was making a silkscreen, somebody else would be filming a screen test. Every day something new."

Warhol created a sexually lenient environment at the Factory for the "happenings" staged there, which included fake weddings between drag queens, porn film rentals, and vulgar plays. What was called free love took place in the studio, as sexuality in the 1960s was becoming more open and embraced as a high ideal. Many Warhol films, including those made at the Factory, were shown at the New Andy Warhol Garrick Theatre or 55th Street Playhouse.

In 1967, Warhol created the business Factory Additions to handle the business of publishing and printmaking. That year, he began looking for a new Factory location because the building was scheduled to be demolished. The location where 231 East 47th Street once was is now the entrance to the parking garage of One Dag.

=== 1968–1974: 33 Union Square West ===
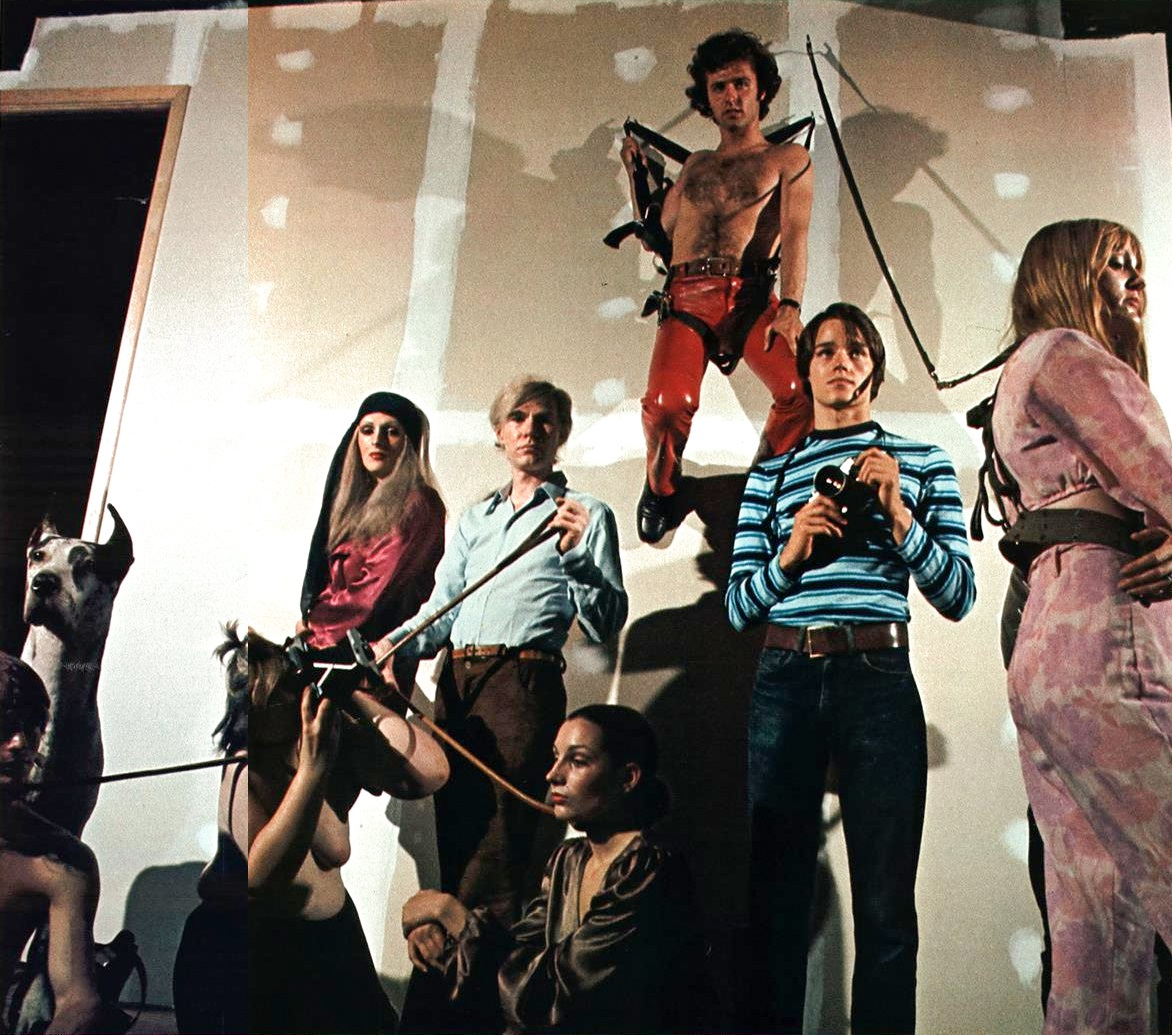
Warhol with his stuffed Great Dane Cecil and members of the Factory: Candy Darling against the wall, Brigid Berlin taking a Polaroid photo, Geraldine Smith on a leash, Jed Johnson holding a camera, Gerard Malanga hanging on the wall, and Ingrid Superstar leashed to the wall. This photo by Claude Picasso was published in Esquire (December 1969).

In February 1968, Warhol relocated the Factory to the Decker Building at 33 Union Square West. During this period, Warhol's office manager Paul Morrissey and business manager Fred Hughes strongly shaped Factory life, though they envisioned it differently. Morrissey wanted a streamlined office focused on film production, "a place that kids wouldn't feel like hanging around." Hughes argued for a mix of art and business, reminding Warhol, "Listen, you’re an artist! What do you want to do? Rent a room with a desk and a sign that says 'Podunk Porno Movies?'" Warhol ultimately sided with Hughes, choosing to search for a large loft with room for art, films, and future endeavors. However, it was actually Morrissey who located the loft at the eleven-story Decker Building near the corner of East 16th Street. He took the entire sixth floor, including a small balcony overlooking Union Square. The location appealed to Warhol in part because of its proximity to Max's Kansas City, which he frequented. During an early visit, Warhol's group shared an elevator with artist Saul Steinberg, who occupied the top floor. Warhol later recalled in his book Popism (1980):

When I look back, I can see that the biggest fights at the Factory were always over decorating. In other areas everybody stuck to their own field of interest, everybody was easygoing, but when it came to how the place should look, everybody had ideas that they turned out to be willing to really fight for.

Fred was doing so much decorating that he nicknamed himself "Frederick of Union Square."

I left the big open spaces to everybody else to section off however they wanted, and I moved into a small narrow office over on the side where I could clutter up and not get in anybody's way.

In early 1968, Billy Name took a series of photographs known as The Bathroom Pictures, depicting a "cross section of friends and strangers, hustlers, camp followers, and 'superstars,'" and Warhol himself emerging from the Factory toilet. They represent the end of an era before Warhol was shot by feminist Valerie Solanas at the Factory in June 1968. The Factory had an open-door policy where anyone could enter, but after the shooting, Warhol's boyfriend Jed Johnson built a wall around the elevator and put in a Dutch door so that visitors would have to be buzzed in.

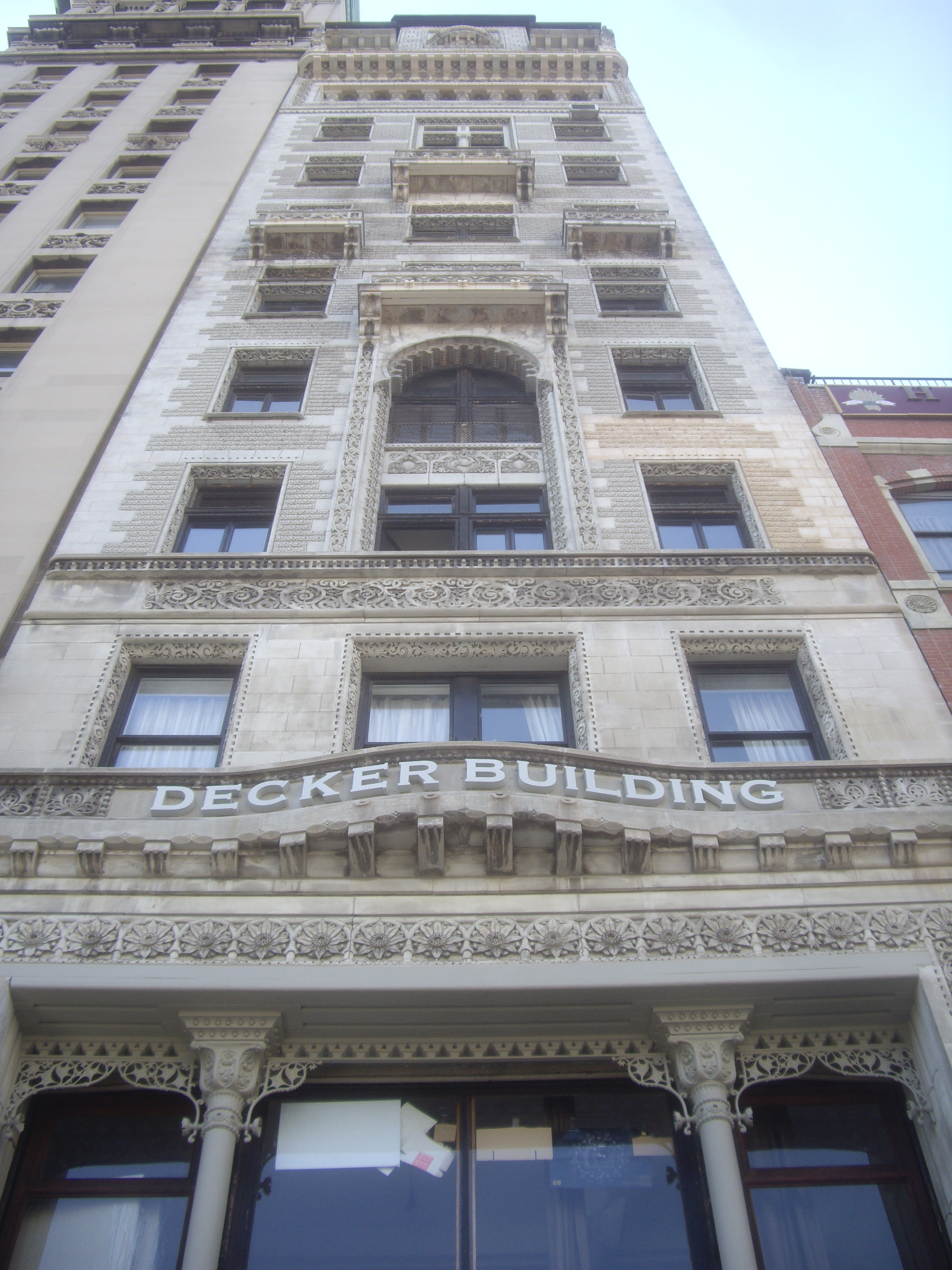
The Decker Building, the second location of the Factory at 33 Union Square West

In 1969, Warhol co-founded Interview magazine and the Factory transformed "from an all-night party to an all-day office, from hell-on-earth to down-to-earth." Aside from the prints and paintings, Warhol produced films and commissioned work. The studio was characterized by John Chamberlain's galvanized steel sculpture, Papagayo (1967), that stood near the front door.

Despite the new security precautions put in place after the shooting, two gunmen broke into the Factory in 1971 and demanded to see Warhol. Warhol was led by Warhol superstar Joe Dallesandro and Johnson to the editing room in a terrified state. The intruders refused to leave when Morrissey and Hughes gave them money and plane tickets. They then took Dallesandro's son from his wife's arms and threatened to shoot him unless Warhol emerged. After Dallesandro informed the two that Warhol had called the police, the intruders surrendered his son and fled the scene.

In the early 1970s, Warhol's social circle and artistic direction shifted markedly. The earlier Factory milieu of "speed freaks" and drag performers gave way to a more rarefied "High Bohemia" of collectors, dealers, and figures from show business and café society, many drawn in by the sociable presence of Hughes. At the same time, Warhol moved away from the flat, mechanical aesthetic of Pop art toward a more painterly approach influenced by Willem de Kooning. This shift is evident in his numerous portraits of Mao Zedong, in which he reworked one of the twentieth century's most iconic images—an approach that some critics argued diminished its political gravity.

By 1973, Warhol and his circle had outgrown the Factory, prompting a move to larger premises to accommodate the expanding operations of Interview magazine.

=== 1974–1984: 860 Broadway ===
In August 1974, Warhol relocated the Factory to 860 Broadway, a former 19th-century warehouse overlooking Union Square Park at East 17th Street and Broadway in Manhattan. He leased the entire third floor, installing security features such as closed-circuit TVs, while Warhol's boyfriend Jed Johnson and architect Peter Marino oversaw the renovation of the space.

The new Factory was noted for its comparatively subdued atmosphere, shaped in part by the presence of large Art Deco furnishings that were props from his films. The boardroom, which was already lush with carved wood paneling, featured a moose head that was given to Warhol by art historian John Richardson. The elegant furniture, including complete sets of chairs designed by Edgar Brandt and Émile-Jacques Ruhlmann, was "used furniture," according to Warhol. "It was stuff we used for a movie [L'Amour] we were making in Paris a couple of years ago. Now we use it as a conference table, and for the lunches we bring in every day from Brownies on 16th Street. We eat here out of paper boxes with people like Bertolucci and Sylvia Miles and big producers like Grimaldi," he said.

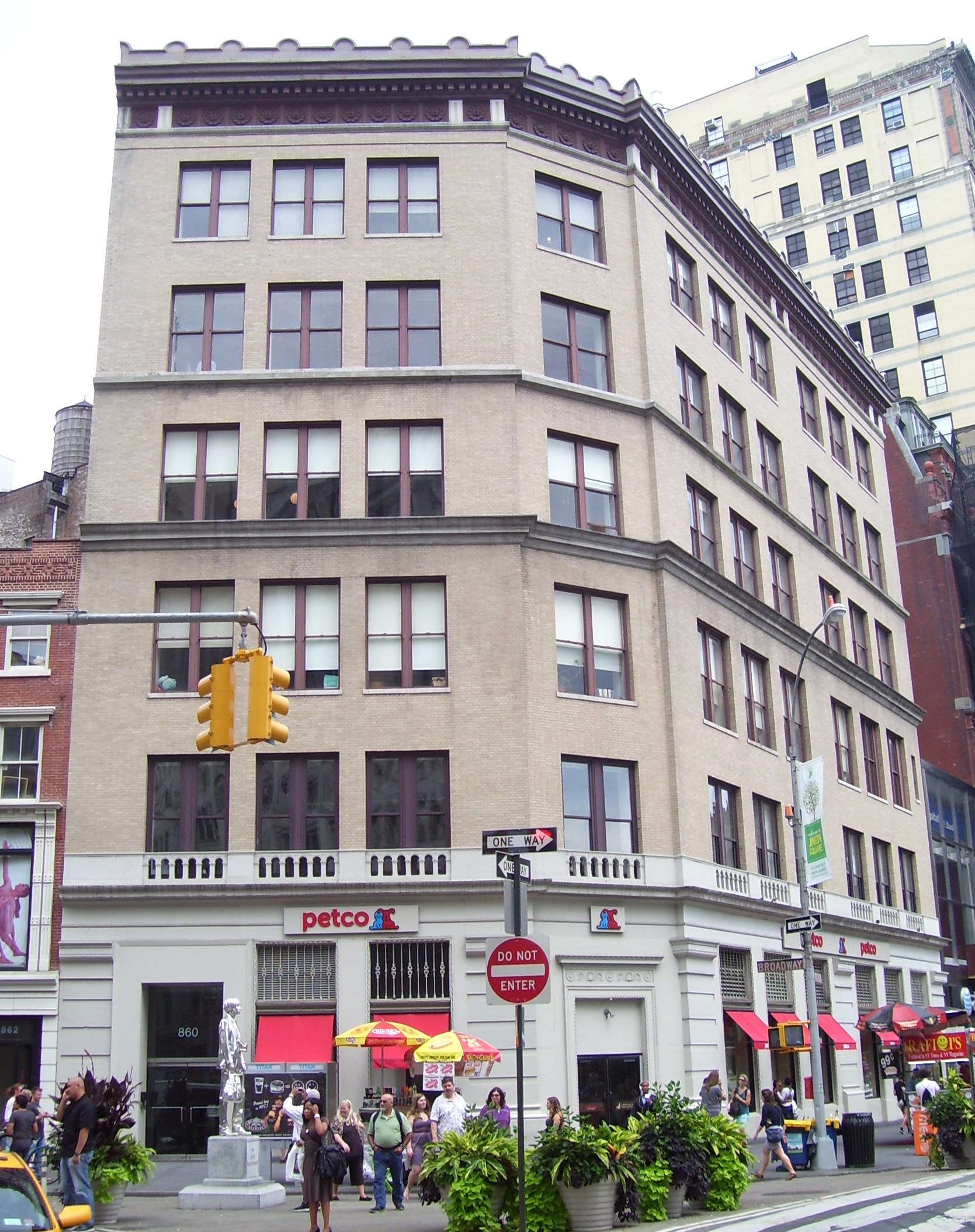
The third incarnation of the Factory at 860 Broadway

Beige plasterboard barriers with white spackle divided the Factory into spaces for Warhol's many activities, including painting, publishing, and filmmaking. The space had an unfinished appearance, which he liked. "The random spackling makes nice, quiet background for paintings," explained the artist. In the foyer, there was the "guard dog"—a stuffed Great Dane named Cecil—rumored to have belonged to film director Cecil B. DeMille, but had actually been a champion dog, whose real name was Ador Tipp Topp. For Warhol, Cecil was a fruitless attempt to deter burglars who, he claimed, broke in almost every Friday.

The Factory did not have many paintings on display. There is a massive landscape painting by 19th-century French realist Gustave Courbet; the other paintings, including Warhol's, were stacked on furniture and lean against the wall. A steady stream of famous people visited the Factory. Numerous guests arrived to be interviewed for Interview magazine. Visitors are greeted with a massive wooden bust of Leonardo da Vinci after being buzzed through glass doors.

Despite some continuity in décor, the atmosphere at 860 Broadway differed from the earlier Factory. Much of this shift has been attributed to Warhol's business manager Fred Hughes, who sought to cultivate a more polished and socially prominent environment. Under his influence, the Factory attracted a more elite, internationally minded crowd, including figures from aristocratic and high-society circles such as Lady Anne Lambton and Catherine Guinness who contributed to both the studio and Interview.

Another key presence was Bob Colacello, editor of Interview, whose role included documenting the worlds of art, fashion, entertainment, and café society, as well as drawing prominent personalities to the space. Through the combined efforts of Hughes and Colacello, the Factory evolved into a central social hub—effectively functioning as one of Manhattan's most active salons, where Warhol regularly presided over a rotating cast of artists, celebrities, and cultural figures.

By 1980, Warhol had once again outgrown his studio at 860 Broadway and began searching for a new Factory location to accommodate his expanding business ventures in television and print. His Interview magazine had reached a circulation of 90,000 in 1981, and he filmed his television series Andy Warhol's TV from 1980 to 1983.

=== 1984–1987: 158 Madison Ave (22 East 33rd Street) ===
In August 1981, Warhol toured 22 East 33rd Street, a former Con Edison substation. He remarked in his diary: "It's a beautiful building, but buying it would be like buying a beautiful piece of art, this beautiful space. And it has a main big T-shaped room that could be a great Interview office, but you can't rent anything out. It goes up five floors and there's no heat, it's just like one shell, but it's so perfectly beautiful." In November 1981, Warhol purchased the building, acquiring approximately 40,000 square feet across three connected sections. The five-story Madison Avenue portion sold for $900,000, while the one- and three-story sections on East 32nd and 33rd Streets sold for $500,000 each; all featured large windowed facades. After renovations, Warhol relocated his studio there at the end of 1984. From 1985 to 1987, the building housed the production of Andy Warhol's Fifteen Minutes for MTV. The television studio had an entrance at 158 Madison Avenue and Interview magazine office had an entrance at 19 East 32nd Street. Following Warhol's death in 1987, the property served as the headquarters of the Andy Warhol Foundation for the Visual Arts until 1994.

In 2007, Thor Equities purchased the property for $28.4 million, and it was demolished to make way for the Sundari Lofts and Towers.

== The Factory milieu ==
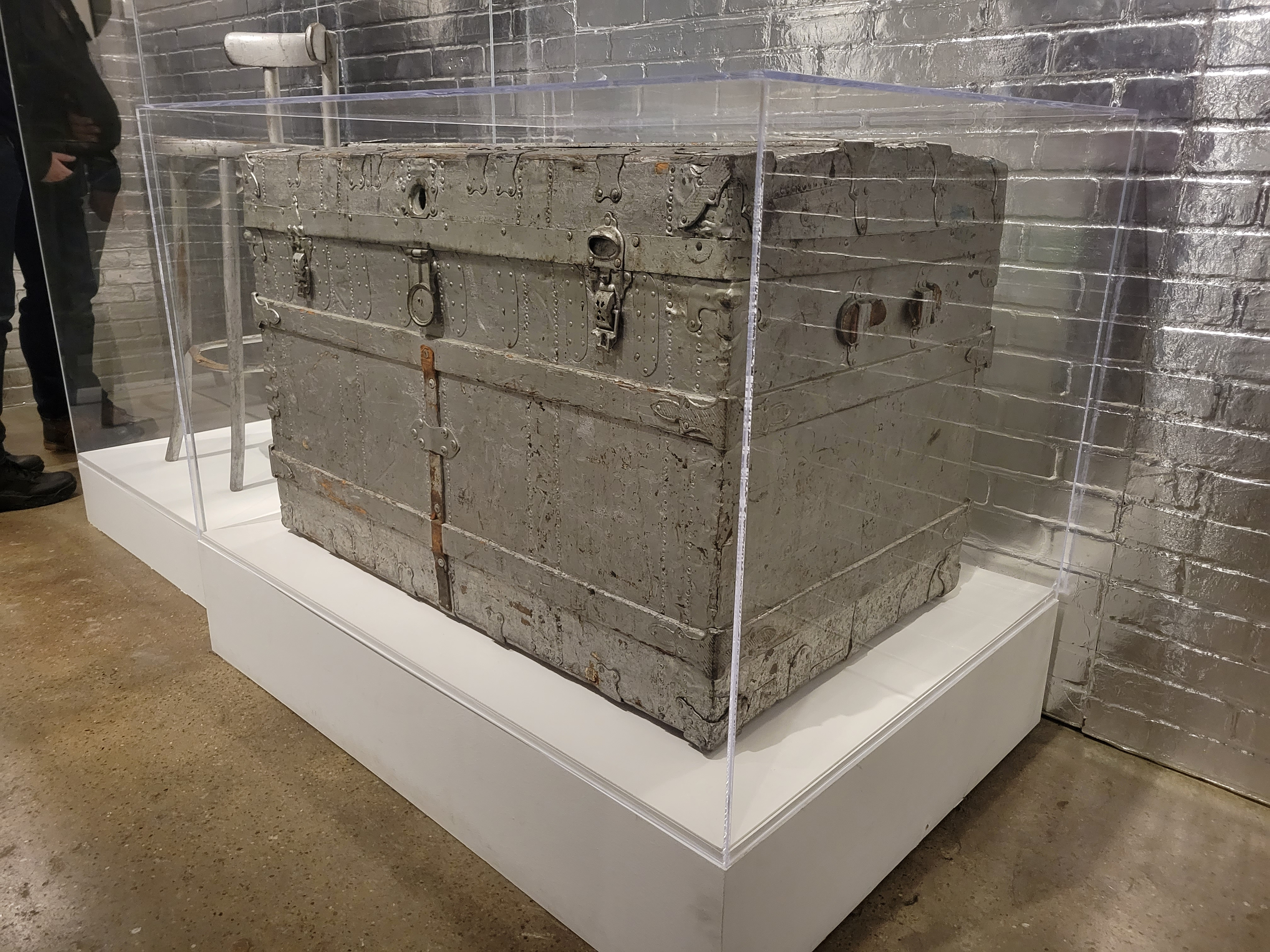
This trunk was used at Warhol's Silver Factory as a storage unit and film prop. Edie Sedgwick sits on this trunk in Vinyl (1965). After Warhol died in 1987, negatives of photographs by Billy Name were found inside the trunk, as well as the script of Up Your Ass (1965) by Valerie Solanas, which was thought to have been lost.

=== Music ===
The Factory became a meeting place of artists and musicians such as Lou Reed, Bob Dylan, and Mick Jagger, as well as writer Truman Capote. Less frequent visitors included Salvador Dalí and Allen Ginsberg. Warhol collaborated with Reed's influential New York rock band the Velvet Underground in 1965, and designed the noted cover for The Velvet Underground & Nico, the band's debut album. It featured a plastic image of a yellow banana, which users could peel off to reveal a flesh-hued version of the banana. Warhol also designed the album cover for the Rolling Stones' album Sticky Fingers.

Warhol included the Velvet Underground in the Exploding Plastic Inevitable, a spectacle that combined art, rock, Warhol films and dancers of all kinds, as well as live S&M enactments and imagery. The Velvet Underground and EPI used the Factory as a place to rehearse and hang out. The song "Walk on the Wild Side", Lou Reed's best-known song from his solo career, was released on his second, and first commercially successful, solo album, Transformer (1972). The song relates to the superstars and life of the Factory. He mentions Holly Woodlawn, Candy Darling, Joe Dallesandro, Jackie Curtis and Joe Campbell (referred to in the song by his Factory nickname Sugar Plum Fairy).

=== Films ===
Warhol started shooting movies in the Factory with experimental films such as Kiss (1964) and Blow Job (1964). He screened his films at the Factory for his friends before they were released for public audiences. When traditional theaters refused to screen his more provocative films, Warhol sometimes turned to night-clubs or porn theaters, including the New Andy Warhol Garrick Theatre and the 55th Street Playhouse, for their distribution. While Warhol was recuperating from the June 1968 assassination attempt, Paul Morrissey stepped in to handle the filming and oversee the Factory’s operations.

=== Warhol superstars ===
Warhol superstars were a shifting group of actors, models, and downtown personalities who appeared in Warhol's underground films and became central figures at the Factory during the 1960s and 1970s. Celebrated more for their charisma than traditional fame, they embodied Warhol's idea that anyone could become a "superstar." Notable figures included Baby Jane Holzer, Edie Sedgwick, Ultra Violet, Viva, Joe Dallesandro, Candy Darling, Holly Woodlawn, Jackie Curtis, and Jane Forth. Their presence helped define the Factory’s mix of art, performance, and countercultural glamour, and they remain closely associated with Warhol's legacy and his fascination with celebrity and reinvention.

== Locations ==
- Factory: 231 East 47th Street, 1963–1968 (demolished)
- Factory: 33 Union Square, 1968–1973 (Decker Building)
- Factory: 860 Broadway, 1974–1984 (Butler Building)
- Factory: 158 Madison Ave (22 East 33rd Street), 1984–1987 (demolished)

== Sources ==
- Warhol, Andy; Hackett, Pat (1980). POPism: The Warhol '60s. Hardcore Brace Jovanovich. ISBN 978-0-15-173095-7.
- Hackett, Pat, ed. (1989). The Andy Warhol Diaries. New York: Warner Books. ISBN 9780446514262.
- Watson, Steven (2003). Factory Made: Warhol and the Sixties. New York: Pantheon Books. ISBN 978-0-679-42372-0.
