= Anton Perich =

Croatian-American filmmaker, photographer and video artist

Anton Perich (born 1945) is a Croatian-American artist, filmmaker, photographer, and video artist. He became associated with the New York City avant-garde art scene in the 1970s through his photographs documenting the cultural milieu surrounding Max's Kansas City. Perich was an early pioneer of public-access television, producing experimental programs that featured artists and performers from New York's downtown scene. He founded NIGHT, a magazine documenting New York nightlife, particularly Studio 54. He also developed an electronic painting machine that has been described as an early precursor to the inkjet printer.

== Life and career ==
=== Early life and Paris ===
Anton Perich was born in Yugoslavia near Dubrovnik, Croatia, in 1945. He studied literature in Zagreb before moving to Paris in 1965. There he became involved with the Lettrist movement and worked with its founder Isidore Isou and artist Maurice Lemaître. He also became involved with the French underground film scene and organized screenings of avant-garde and underground films at the American Center in Paris.

Perich later recalled participating in the cultural upheaval surrounding the May 1968 protests and described Paris during the period as a formative influence on his artistic development. He also appeared in early French underground films, including Départ d'Eurydice, directed by Raphaël Bassan. During that period, Perich changed his first name and became Antoine Perich, because Anton was not familiar a name in France.

=== Early days in New York ===
In 1970, Perich arrived in New York City and became acquainted with the busboys at Max's Kansas City, who described it as "the best job in America." He joined the restaurant's staff in 1972, working alongside busboy Carlos Falchi and manager Eric Emerson. Debbie Harry was also working there as a waitress, although Perich later recalled that he did not encounter her at the time.

Perich befriended Pop artist Andy Warhol at the Factory in Union Square, Manhattan. According to Perich, Warhol noticed that he had a camera and invited him to contribute photographs to Interview magazine. He subsequently photographed members of Warhol's circle and the wider downtown scene for the magazine. Perich has said that he photographed many of the same people repeatedly, treating the nightlife scene as an ongoing performance. His photographs of the period include portraits of Warhol, Andrea Feldman, Candy Darling, Jackie Curtis, Holly Woodlawn, Robert Mapplethorpe, and Lou Reed.

=== Video and public-access television ===
Art gallery director Joseph LoGiudice lent Perich the large loft above his gallery as a workspace, where he developed early media projects. In February 1973, Perich began broadcasting his videotapes through Teleprompter and Sterling Manhattan Cable Television, which operated Manhattan's cable systems. His programs aired at 11 p.m. on Sundays under FCC regulations governing public-access television. His early programs were described as "a poor man's Chelsea Girls," reflecting the influence of Warhol's film on his work. His first program, Mr. Fixit, aired on February 4, 1973, and was an improvised comic soap opera starring Sami Melange, Henri Henry, Susan Blond, and Tinkerbelle. Its sexual content and profanity prompted viewer complaints and led the cable companies to begin reviewing some public-access programs before broadcast.

During his first month of broadcasting, only one of Perich's programs was rejected during pre-screening: The Hughes Affair, a satire filmed at the Chelsea Hotel while author Clifford Irving was staying there, featuring actors portraying Irving and film producer Howard Hughes. The New York Daily News reported that the concern was apparently potential slander rather than obscenity.

Perich drew many of his performers from Warhol's stable of superstars, including off-Broadway actress Candy Darling, actor-poet Taylor Mead, and actress Cyrinda Foxe. In addition to sexually themed programs, he produced documentaries about New York rock groups and a recurring program in which Mead offered comic psychological advice. Perich defended the experimental nature of his programming, arguing that videotape was particularly suited to television and the home rather than theatrical exhibition.

Perich described his public-access programs as "media work" rather than art, emphasizing the discipline of producing a one-hour program each week with minimal editing. He worked on a rapid production schedule, shooting material only a day or two before its broadcast. In March 1973, he also presented videotapes at the Abbey Theater on East 13th Street in New York, where audiences could be recorded and immediately watch themselves on video.

In April 1973, Newsweek reported that Anton's late-night programs drew criticism from Paul Crotty, a lawyer who had formed the group Concerned Citizens on Public Access, who accused Perich of "corrupting the whole concept of public access." Perich defended the freedom of public-access television, describing his programming as "realistic satire made by comedians." He argued that viewers should be allowed to decide for themselves whether to watch his tapes and described public access as "the most important thing in television. What happens here will have a powerful effect on commercial TV."

By 1976, Perich was producing After Hours, which aired at midnight on Saturday nights on Channel J. The program followed his earlier series Invasion of Privacy, which had featured nudity and explicit language. Perich also collected old television sets, often dismantling them and displaying their exposed components as sculptural objects. He regarded television less as something to watch than as a constant part of everyday life, keeping multiple sets running for much of the day in his First Avenue apartment.

=== Painting machine ===
In 1977–78, Perich designed and built an electric painting machine that transferred paint onto paper or canvas using electronically controlled lines. The machine was constructed from components including Army surplus equipment and incorporated a photocell mechanism. The resulting works became known as his machine paintings.

The machine has been described as an early predecessor of the inkjet printer. Perich developed the process from his interest in the dots and lines that composed television images, translating those elements into a mechanical painting process. His machine paintings subsequently became an important part of his artistic practice.

=== NIGHT magazine ===
In 1978, Perich founded NIGHT, a magazine devoted initially to Studio 54 and New York nightlife. Inspired in part by Warhol's Interview, the magazine combined photography, art, fashion, music, and interviews. The first issue, published in September 1978, was a Studio 54 Special consisting primarily of Perich's photographs.

Perich served as the magazine's publisher, editor, art director, and principal photographer. Its oversized format and emphasis on photography distinguished it from conventional magazines of the period. Later issues expanded coverage to other New York nightclubs and included contributions from figures such as Helmut Newton, Antonio Lopez, Victor Bockris, Candace Bushnell, and Neke Carson.

=== Later years ===
In 1995, Perich exhibited large paintings at the Schoolhouse Galleries in northern Westchester County, New York. The works combined masking tape with freely applied acrylic lines and incorporated personal, folk, and religious imagery. The exhibition also included Perich's homemade painting machine, which The New York Times compared to a Moog synthesizer, through which he could vary the density of electronically produced lines to create compositions resembling photographs or distorted video images.

In 2012, the Italian film production Minimal Cinema produced In the fabulous underground, an unconventional art documentary and a portrait of Perich as an artist and as a man, directed by Claudio Romano and Mauro John Capece and produced by Betty L'Innocente. The film was screened at the Contemporary Arts Center in New Orleans.

== Personal life ==
In 1980, Perich married Candace Fischer and they had two sons, including composer and visual artist Tristan Perich.

== Selected exhibitions ==
Perich's work has been presented in solo exhibitions at venues including Gotham Book Mart Gallery in New York (1972), Tony Shafrazi Gallery in New York (1979), Gallery Hirondelle in New York (1988), Galleria 12/13 in Rome (2008), Microscope Gallery in Brooklyn (2011), and the Dominican Monastery in Dubrovnik (2013).

In 2006, Anthology Film Archives in New York presented a retrospective of Perich's video work.

In 2014, Postmasters Gallery presented Electric Paintings 1978–2014, a survey of Perich's machine paintings. The exhibition was accompanied by selections from his public-access television programs originally produced in 1973.
