= Andy Warhol's Bad =

1977 film by Jed Johnson

- Directed by: Jed Johnson
- Written by: Pat Hackett; George Abagnalo
- Produced by: Jeff Tornberg; Andy Warhol
- Starring: Carroll Baker; Perry King; Susan Tyrrell
- Cinematography: Alan Metzger
- Edited by: David McKenna
- Music by: Mike Bloomfield
- Production company: Factory Films
- Distributed by: New World Pictures (United States); EMI Films (United Kingdom); Dear Film (Italy); Constantin Film (Germany); Nippon Herald Films (Japan)
- Release dates: March 24, 1977 (Los Angeles); May 4, 1977 (New York City)
- Running time: 105 minutes
- Country: United States
- Language: English
- Budget: $1.25 million

Bad, also known as Andy Warhol's Bad, is a 1977 American black comedy film directed by Jed Johnson and produced by Andy Warhol. Written by Pat Hackett and George Abagnalo, it stars Carroll Baker as the owner of a beauty salon that serves as a front for a murder-for-hire operation.

Bad received mixed reviews, with critics divided over its gruesome violence and dark humor. Despite its commercial failure, Susan Tyrrell won the Saturn Award for Best Supporting Actress for her performance, and the film has since become a cult classic.

== Plot ==
Hazel Aiken (Carroll Baker) runs an electrolysis business from her home that also serves as a front for arranging murders for clients. She employs only women as assassins and rents rooms to some of them. Her household includes her husband (Gordon Oas-Heim), her elderly mother (Mary Boylan), and her daughter-in-law Mary (Susan Tyrrell), who lives there with her baby while waiting for her absent husband to return.

Although Hazel avoids using men for her assignments, she makes an exception when she hires L.T. (Perry King) for a $10,000 contract to kill a client's autistic son. While waiting to carry out the job, L.T. stays at Hazel's house and engages in petty theft, behavior Hazel tolerates because of the money involved. Meanwhile, Detective Hughes (Charles McGregor), the corrupt police officer who protects Hazel's operation, pressures her for payments and demands that she help him arrest one of her own associates.

Hazel continues arranging contracts, including a hit ordered by the wife of a musician whose arm was severed during a robbery, and an assignment involving a woman who wants her neighbor's dog killed after believing she was insulted. The latter job spirals out of control when the hired killers accidentally start a theater fire that kills several people, while failing to complete the intended hit.

Another client hires Hazel to arrange the murder of her crying infant but kills the child herself by throwing it from a high-rise window before the assassin arrives. L.T. ultimately fails to carry out his assignment, not out of sympathy but because he is frustrated that the child's mother expects him to do what she cannot.

After L.T.'s failed mission leaves Hazel unable to pay Hughes, the two argue in her kitchen. When Hazel insults him, Hughes kills her by drowning her in the sink and takes her client records. Mary discovers Hazel's body but fails to understand what has happened, allowing Hughes to leave with the evidence.

== Cast ==
- Carroll Baker as Hazel Aiken
- Perry King as L.T.
- Susan Tyrrell as Mary Aiken
- Stefania Casini as P.G.
- Cyrinda Foxe as R.C.
- Mary Boylan as Grandmother
- Charles McGregor as Detective
- Tere Tereba as Ingrid Joyner
- Brigid Berlin as Estelle
- Susan Blond as Young mother
- Maria Smith as Marsha
- Geraldine Smith as Glenda
- Lawrence Tierney as O'Reilly
- Russell Joyner as Joe Lamba
- Renee Paris as Sara Leachman
- John Starke as Joe Leachman
- Gordon Oas-Heim as Mr. Aiken
- Barbara Allen as S.F.

== Production ==
=== Pre-production ===
Unlike earlier Warhol films, Bad was made without the regular director-actor partnership of Paul Morrissey and Joe Dallesandro. Morrissey had amicably parted ways with Warhol and relocated to Hollywood to pursue a career in commercial filmmaking independently.

Planning for Bad began in fall 1974, when Warhol and businessman Peter Brant considered financing a new feature film directed by Warhol's longtime partner Jed Johnson, who had previously assisted Morrissey. George Abagnalo, who conceived the idea, recalled that Warhol was attracted to the title itself, saying he did not care what the film was about because he loved the name. Abagnalo developed the plot and synopsis, while Pat Hackett refined the dialogue, and by October 1975, their screenplay was complete.

Originally conceived as a low-budget production, Bad ultimately became the most expensive Warhol film to date, with a budget of approximately $1.25 million. Australian producer Robert Stigwood initially backed the project but later withdrew. Warhol financed the film with income from his portrait commissions, while his business manager Fred Hughes invested $200,000 and arranged an $800,000 investment from Brant.

According to Perry King, Warhol envisioned Bad as a film about "bad women and incompetent men." King was cast in a Dallesandro-type role and recalled that crew members sometimes referred to him as "Joe." He was offered the role without auditioning following his performance in Mandingo (1975), which he said appealed to Warhol's fascination with "trash" culture.

The lead role was originally offered to Shelley Winters, who declined because she found the script excessively violent. "'I already played Ma Barker' … 'This one is bloodier than "Bloody Mama." If they really do all the stuff in that script, they're going to have a lot to answer for,'" Winters said in 1976. Vivian Vance was also reportedly considered before Carroll Baker was cast in her first American film in eight years after working primarily in Europe.

Tab Hunter wanted the role of Hazel's husband, but Gordon Oas-Heim was cast instead.

Before filming began, producer Jeff Tornberg secured foreign distribution deals for the film. It was slated for release by EMI in the United Kingdom and Australasian territories, Dear Film in Italy, Constantin in West Germany, Austria, and Switzerland, and Nippon Herald in Japan.

=== Filming ===
Production commenced before an American distributor had been secured. As a union production, the film was shot on 35 mm film over an eight-week schedule, marking a departure from Warhol's earlier filmmaking methods. His previous professionally produced features, Flesh for Frankenstein (1973) and Blood for Dracula (1974), had been filmed in Italy under producer Carlo Ponti.

Principal photography began in May 1976 and marked the first Warhol production to begin with a completed screenplay rather than relying largely on improvisation. Much of the film was shot on a soundstage in a converted warehouse on West 19th Street near the Hudson River docks in Manhattan, with additional location filming in the Riverdale neighborhood of the Bronx and a candy store in Queens.

King later described the film as Warhol's attempt to make a mainstream Hollywood production, recalling that the cast approached the material seriously despite its outrageous subject matter. Baker similarly described the film as "an attack on middle-class morality," with seemingly ordinary characters who commit monstrous acts.

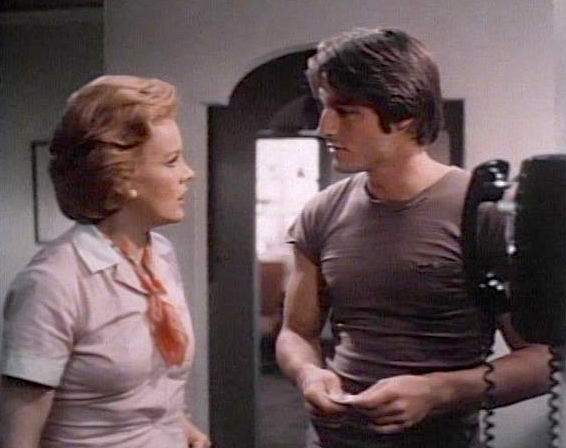
Carroll Baker and Perry King in a scene from Bad

King later said that he and Baker struggled during the first half of production and they "couldn't count on help from [director] Jed Johnson because he was just a kid and he didn't really know what he was doing." He recalled that Susan Tyrrell encouraged the cast to abandon conventional approaches to character development and instead embrace the improvisational style associated with Warhol's films.

King also recalled that he, Baker, and Tyrrell threatened to leave the production over a scripted scene in which a baby is thrown from a window. Although Johnson promised the scene would not be filmed, King said it was shot after the principal cast had completed their work. "As much as I hate it—it really fits in with the rest of that over-the-top universe," he said.

=== Post-production ===
After New World Pictures acquired the U.S. distribution rights, Hughes and Andy Warhol Enterprise bookkeeper Vincent Fremont wrote to the company requesting that it remove a scene in which a baby is thrown from a window because it undermined the film's black humor. According to Fremont, the distributor left the scene in and provided little funding to the film's promotion, which he believed contributed to its commercial failure.

== Release ==
Warhol recorded in The Andy Warhol Diaries that his former secretary, Susan Pile, hosted a screening of Bad at the Picwood Theatre in Los Angeles on March 24, 1977. The screening drew more than 750 attendees, including Warren Beatty, Jack Nicholson, Julie Christie, and George Cukor.

The film had its American premiere as a midnight screening at Filmex on March 27, 1977. It began its theatrical release on April 8 at the Mann Westwood 4 (1050 Gayley Ave) and the Hollywood Theatre (6764 Hollywood Blvd) in Los Angeles, and the Saxon Theatre (219 Tremont) in Boston. The Pacific Film Archive presented a preview screening on April 21 at the University of California, Berkeley. Bad subsequently opened for its regular theatrical run in the San Francisco Bay Area on April 27, at the Music Hall (931 Larkin) in San Francisco and Cinema (2230 Shattuck Ave) in Berkeley.

The film opened in the New York metropolitan area on May 4, 1977. In Manhattan, it screened at RKO Cinerama 2 (1579 Broadway), RKO 86th Street Twin (1284 Lexington Ave), UA Eastside Cinema (919 3rd Ave), and Lightstone's Quad Cinema (34 W 13th St). It also opened at UA Pequa in Massapequa, New York and the Belair Twin theatre in Valley Stream, New York, as well as UA Little Cinema in Wayne, New Jersey and UA Teaneck in Teaneck, New Jersey.

In September 1977, Bad was screened at the Deauville American Film Festival. It opened theatrically in Paris that month at the Saint-Germain Huchette (43 rue de la Harpe) and the Elysées-Lincoln (14 rue Lincoln).

Bad was temporarily confiscated and banned in Germany because of its violent content, including the scene in which a baby is thrown from a window. According to Fremont, the film was later approved for exhibition after certain scenes were removed, although he said the delay diminished its theatrical momentum. Fremont recalled that Warhol lost approximately $400,000 on the project. He said the financial losses discouraged Warhol from financing future films, despite his continuing interest in cinema.

== Reception ==
Variety described Bad as "a compellingly revolting experience" among the "blackest of black comedies." They noted the script "is a good piece of craftsmanship," and Johnson "handled the direction in top fashion."

Kevin Thomas of the Los Angeles Times wrote that the film "isn't so bad as it is merely morbid and depressing."

Vincent Canby of The New York Times called the film "an artifact of our time as a comment upon it. It's a deadpanned, Grand Guignol comedy." "'Bad' comes close to the sort of thing that Joe Orton, the late English playwright, was doing in plays like 'Entertaining Mr. Sloane' and 'Loot.' It means to be outrageous," he added.

Gary Arnold of The Washington Post wrote, "Johnson seems to have more technical polish than Warhol or Paul Morrissey, but the surprisingly crisp, professional cinematography on 'Bad' doesn't improve a rotten sensibility." Morrissey, by contrast, described Bad as "a good movie. Extremely irreverent, maybe a little too much so. It came out a little harsh. All the characters are terrible. Nobody's sympathetic. But Jed did a very good job, and it's undeniably funny."

Gene Siskel of the Chicago Tribune gave the film one-and-a-half stars out of four and wrote, "Beware of Andy Warhol's 'Bad.' It has very little of the artist's touch … Right away you can see 'Bad' has Warhol-brand bad taste. But what it lacks is a strong sense of humor."

Maurice Yacowar wrote for the St. Catharines Standard, "The basic tone is of an absurd, catastrophic and banal society approached with detachment and understatement. Warhol remains one of the truly seminal figures in 1970s culture. The film is rich in detail."

Joe Baltake of the Philadelphia Daily News wrote, "Director Jed Johnson … stresses all the perversity and seediness inherent to the subject matter, adding even further color to it with some deadpan humor and touched of Grand Guignol. His movie is reminiscent of one of Robert Aldrich's "women's movies"—"Autumn Leaves" and "Whatever Happened to Baby Jane?"—gone berserk. ... and regardless of what you might think of it, you'll have to agree that Carroll Baker's performance is the titanic supporting structure here."

== Awards ==
Tyrrell won the Saturn Award for Best Supporting Actress for her performance at the 5th Saturn Awards in 1978.

== Legacy ==
Although Bad was unsuccessful upon its initial release, it has gained a cult following. It's the last feature film produced by Warhol and marked the end of his involvement in filmmaking until he acquired the rights to Tama Janowitz's bestselling novel Slaves of New York in 1986, intending to produce the film adaptation before his death. Johnson did not direct another film, instead pursuing a career as an antiques dealer and subsequently becoming an interior decorator.

== See also ==
- Andy Warhol filmography
