= Exploding Plastic Inevitable =

Series of multimedia events by Andy Warhol

The Exploding Plastic Inevitable (originally known as the Erupting Plastic Inevitable and later known as Plastic Inevitable or EPI), was a series of multimedia gesamtkunstwerk events organized by Andy Warhol and Paul Morrissey in 1966 and 1967. Combining live rock music, experimental film, dance, and light projections, the performances became closely associated with the experimental rock group the Velvet Underground and are regarded as a pioneering influence on psychedelic and multimedia performance art.

== Background ==
In 1963, Pop artist Andy Warhol participated in an avant-garde musical project known as the Druds alongside Patty Mucha, Lucas Samaras, Jasper Johns, Walter De Maria, La Monte Young, and Larry Poons. Although short-lived, the project reflected Warhol's early interest in experimental music and performance.

1966 promotional poster for the Exploding Plastic Inevitable month-long performance at 23 St. Marks Place in New York City

Warhol later recalled that filmmaker Barbara Rubin "was one of the first people to get multimedia interest going around New York," noting that she frequently brought musicians such as Donovan and the Byrds to the Factory. Rubin introduced him to the Velvet Underground through his assistant Gerard Malanga at Café Bizarre in December 1965. Rubin filmed the audience using bright "sun gun" lights and repeatedly asking spectators, "Are you uptight?" Warhol recalled that the venue's management was dissatisfied with the Velvet Underground because their music was "way too loud and insane for any tourist coffeehouse clientele," and the group was close to being dismissed from the club. After the performance, Warhol and filmmaker Paul Morrissey invited the band to visit the Factory and began discussing possible collaborations.

At the time, Warhol and Morrissey had also been approached by a producer planning to convert a large Long Island film studio into a discotheque tentatively titled Murray the K's World. Morrissey envisioned establishing a resident "house band" and considered the Velvet Underground a suitable choice. Warhol also paired the Velvet Underground with the German singer and model Nico, who had recently arrived in New York.

=== New York Society for Clinical Psychiatry ===
Warhol was invited to speak at the annual banquet of the New York Society for Clinical Psychiatry at the Delmonico Hotel on January 13, 1966, by the doctor who chaired the event. Warhol later recalled that he agreed to participate only if he could “speak” through films rather than a traditional lecture, originally planning to screen Harlot (1964) and Henry Geldzahler (1964). After meeting the Velvet Underground, however, he decided instead to present the band. Arriving as the banquet began, Warhol and the Factory entourage performed before an audience of about three hundred psychiatrists and their guests, who had only been told they would watch films after dinner. As the Velvet Underground began playing and Nico sang, Gerard Malanga and Edie Sedgwick danced onstage while Jonas Mekas, Barbara Rubin, and camera crews moved through the room with bright lights, confronting attendees with provocative questions. The chaotic performance shocked many of the psychiatrists and marked the first performance of the Velvet Underground featuring Nico as well as the debut of a Warhol multimedia event. Warhol later recalled being fascinated by the audience's discomfort, while Malanga viewed the evening as symbolic of Sedgwick's fading role in Warhol's circle as Nico emerged as the Factory's new star.

=== Andy Warhol, Up-Tight ===
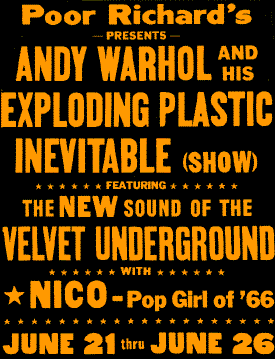
Promotional poster for the Exploding Plastic Inevitable at Poor Richard's in Chicago, June 21–26, 1966

In January 1966, filmmaker Jonas Mekas moved the Film-Makers' Cinemathèque to West 41st Street and began presenting an "Expanded Cinema" series featuring artists such as Jack Smith, La Monte Young, Robert Whitman, Claes Oldenburg, and Robert Rauschenberg, who combined "cinema images and projectors with live action and music." In his memoir POPism, Warhol remembered, "Oldenburg's piece where he dragged a bicycle down the aisle from the last row of the theater while a movie was being projected," as well as a performance by Rauschenberg in which he appeared "electrified and standing on glass bricks holding a live wire and fluorescent tubes."

By February 1966, Warhol had filmed the Velvet Underground rehearsing at the Factory for Symphony of Sound. The band also contributed soundtracks to Warhol's films Hedy (1966) and More Milk, Yvette (1966). From February 8 to February 13, 1966 they performed during screenings of Warhol's films at the Film-Makers' Cinemathèque in a production titled Andy Warhol, Up-Tight.

Factory photographer Billy Name later recalled that "the development of the Exploding Plastic Inevitable came when Edie Sedgwick left us to work with Bob Dylan, after an argument she'd had with Warhol." According to Name, the Factory had initially planned "a Sedgwick retrospective film festival at the Film-Makers' Cinematheque," but after Sedgwick departed, "we decided to put on a more experimental event instead." However, this recollection may conflate Andy Warhol, Up-Tight at the Film-Makers' Cinemathèque with the later Exploding Plastic Inevitable performances at the Dom, as Sedgwick did participate in the Andy Warhol, Up-Tight and appeared on promotional material for the performances, although she left Warhol's circle shortly afterward.

== Exploding Plastic Inevitable at the Dom ==
Seeking a venue for the performances, Warhol and Morrissey subleased the Dom, a Polish dance hall on St. Mark's Place in Manhattan, from light artists Jackie Cassen and Rudy Stern. The interior was painted white to accommodate film and slide projections, while mirrored disco balls, strobe lights, spotlights, and multiple projectors were installed to create an immersive environment, forming the basis for the Erupting Plastic Inevitable. On March 31, 1966, Warhol was issued a temporary cabaret license.

After about a week, the event was renamed to the Exploding Plastic Inevitable. According to Morrissey, he coined the name Exploding Plastic Inevitable while searching for a title for the multimedia performances. He recalled looking at a Bob Dylan album sleeve and being struck by its "gibberish" text, which included a photograph of Rubin on the back. From this, he selected the words "exploding," "plastic," and "inevitable," forming the title of the show.

Soon after, the Dom became the Balloon Farm, and later the Electric Circus.

== Subsequent performances ==
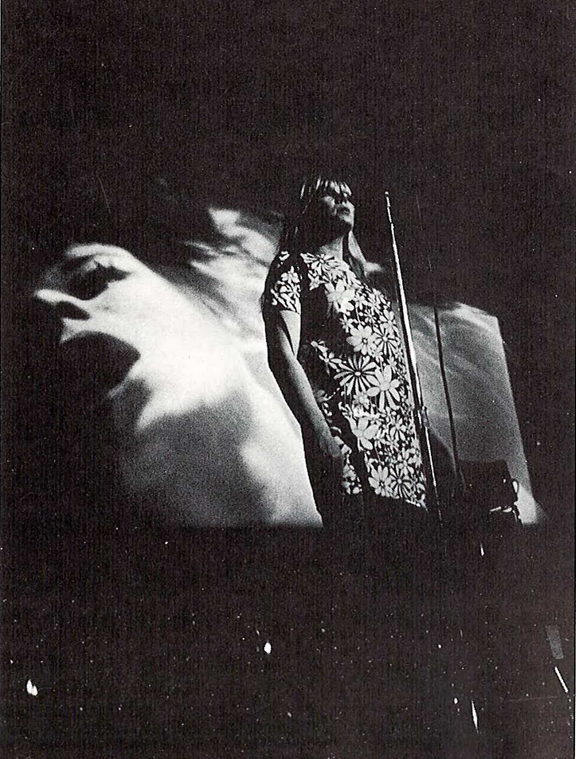
Performance of Exploding Plastic Inevitable in Ann Arbor

E.P.I. shows, a barrage of flashing lights, multi-screened films, sadomasochistic mime, and noise music amplified into distortion, were later held in The Gymnasium in New York City and in various cities throughout Canada and the United States, including Chicago; Boston; Ann Arbor, Michigan; Columbus, Ohio; Leicester, Massachusetts; Cleveland; Provincetown, Massachusetts; Los Angeles and San Francisco. When asked to explain the Exploding Plastic Inevitable Warhol simply said that it's a totality.

The Exploding Plastic Inevitable performed for the last time in May 1967, at Steve Paul's The Scene club in New York.

== Legacy ==
In December 1966, Warhol included a one-off magazine called The Plastic Exploding Inevitable as part of the Aspen No. 3 package.

Additionally, Warhol's lights engineer Danny Williams pioneered many innovations that later became standard practice in psychedelic liquid light shows and subsequently rave culture.

In 1966, from May 27–29 the EPI played the Fillmore in San Francisco, where Williams built a light show including stroboscopes, slides and film projections onstage. At Bill Graham's request he was soon to come back and build more.

== See also ==
- Multimedia
- Gesamtkunstwerk
- Conceptual art
- Experimental rock
