= Geraldine Smith =

Geraldine Smith may refer to:

- Geraldine Smith (politician) (born 1961), British politician
- Geraldine Smith (actress) (born 1949), American actress
