= Virginia Bruce =

American actress and singer (1910–1982)

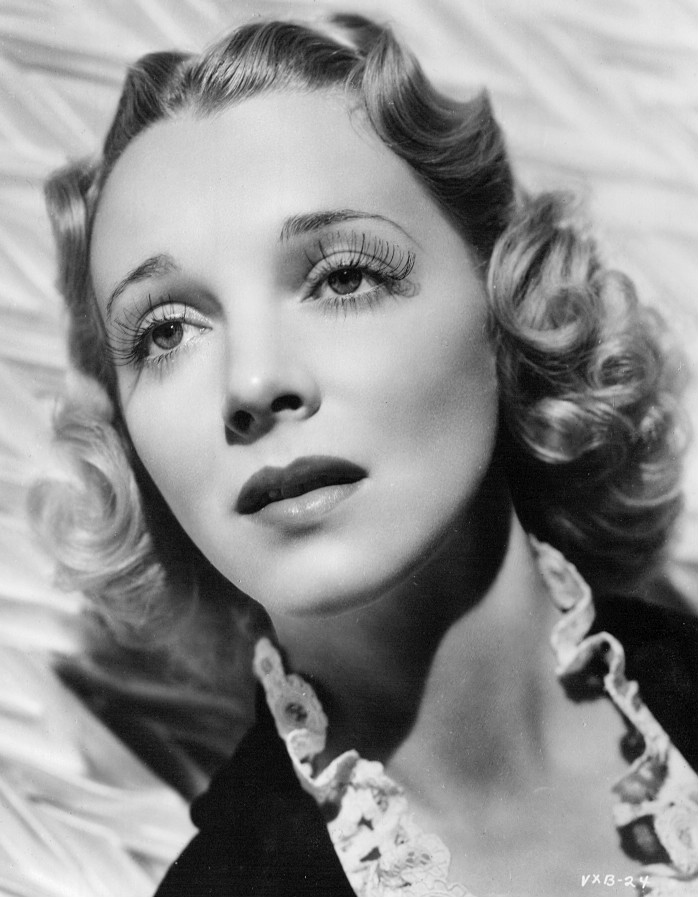
- Publicity photo of Virginia Bruce in 1939
- Born: Helen Virginia Briggs; September 29, 1910; Minneapolis, Minnesota, U.S.
- Died: February 24, 1982 (aged 71); Los Angeles, California, U.S.
- Occupations: Actress, singer
- Years active: 1929–1981
- Spouses: John Gilbert (m. 1932; div. 1934) J. Walter Ruben (m. 1937; died 1942) Ali Ipar (m. 1946; div. 1964)
- Children: 2
- Relatives: Hutch Dano (great-grandson)

Virginia Bruce (born Helen Virginia Briggs; September 29, 1910 – February 24, 1982) was an American actress and singer.

== Early life ==
Bruce was born in Minneapolis, Minnesota. As an infant she moved with her parents, Earil and Margaret Briggs, to Fargo, North Dakota. The city directory of Fargo documents that the Briggs family lived there at 421 14th Street South. After Bruce graduated from Fargo Central High School in 1928, she moved with her family to Los Angeles intending to enroll at the University of California, Los Angeles when a friendly wager sent her seeking film work.

== Career ==
Bruce's first screen work was in 1929 as an extra for Paramount in Why Bring That Up? In 1930, she appeared on Broadway in the musical Smiles at the Ziegfeld Theatre, followed by the Broadway production America's Sweetheart in 1931.

Bruce returned to Hollywood in 1932, where she began work in early August at Metro-Goldwyn-Mayer on the film Kongo starring Walter Huston. During production on that project, on August 10, she married John Gilbert (her first, his fourth) with whom she recently costarred in Downstairs. The Film Daily reported that the couple's "quick" wedding was held in Gilbert's dressing room on the studio lot. Among the people attending the small ceremony were the head of MGM production Irving Thalberg, who served as the groom's best man; screenwriter Donald Ogden Stewart, whose wife Beatrice acted as matron of honor; MGM art director and set designer Cedric Gibbons; and his wife, actress Dolores del Río.

Bruce retired briefly from acting after the birth of their daughter Susan Ann, although she returned to film appearances after her divorce from Gilbert (caused by his alcoholism) in May 1934. Gilbert died of a heart attack in 1936.

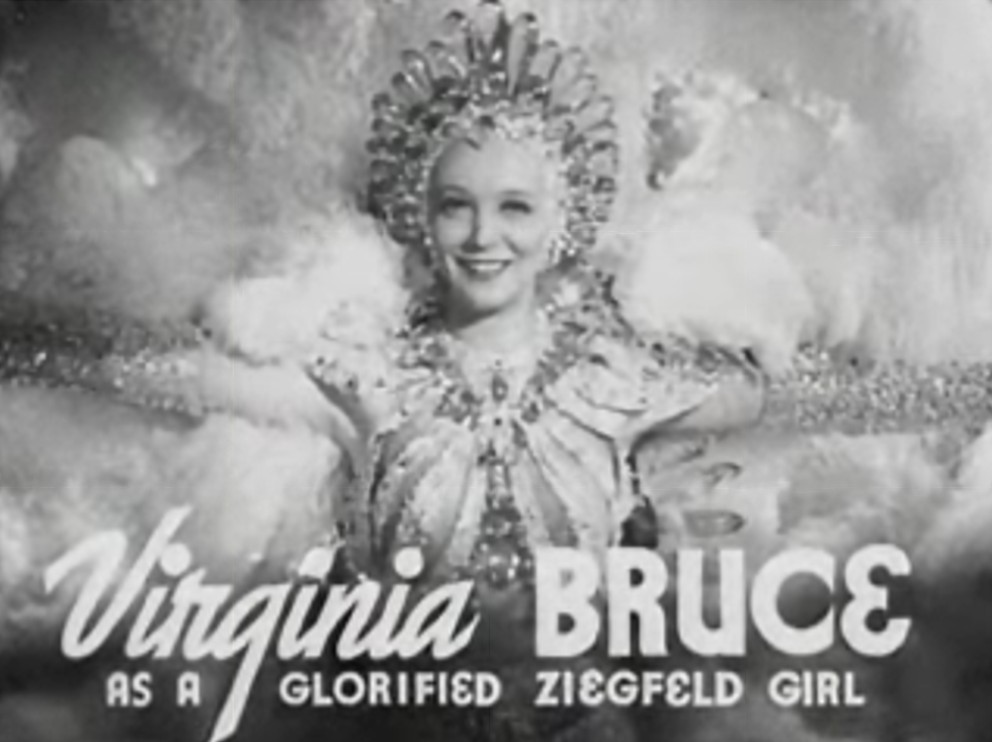
Trailer for The Great Ziegfeld (1936)

Bruce is credited with introducing the Cole Porter standard "I've Got You Under My Skin" in the 1936 film Born to Dance. The same year, she costarred in the MGM musical The Great Ziegfeld. She also performed periodically on radio. In 1949, for example, Bruce starred in Make Believe Town, a 30-minute afternoon drama broadcast daily on CBS Radio. In the early 1960s, she retired from films.

== Personal life ==
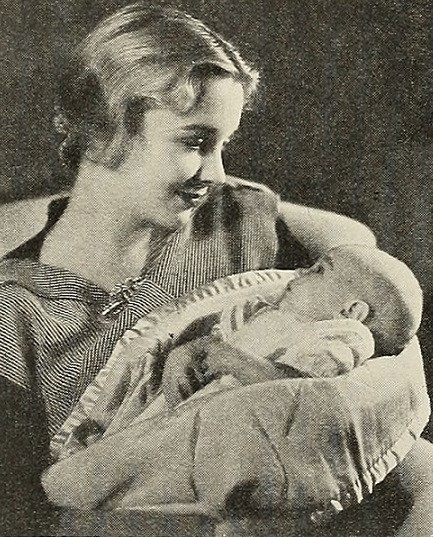
Virginia Bruce in 1934

Bruce married American film director J. Walter Ruben in 1937. She had two children.

Bruce died of cancer at age 71 on February 24, 1982, at the Motion Picture & Television Country House and Hospital in Woodland Hills, Los Angeles, California.

== Filmography ==
Year	Title	Role	Notes
1929	Fugitives	Bit Part	Uncredited
1929	Blue Skies	Party guest	Uncredited
1929	River of Romance	Southern Belle	Uncredited
1929	Fashions in Love		Uncredited
1929	Hard to Get	Young woman	Uncredited
1929	Illusion	Party Guest	Uncredited
1929	Woman Trap	Nurse	
1929	Why Bring That Up?	Chorus Girl	Uncredited
1929	The Love Parade	Lady-in-Waiting	Uncredited
1929	Pointed Heels	Chorus Girl	Uncredited
1930	Lilies of the Field	Doris	
1930	Slightly Scarlet	Enid Corbett	
1930	Only the Brave	Elizabeth	
1930	Young Eagles	Florence Welford	
1930	Paramount on Parade	Chorus Girl	Uncredited
1930	Safety in Numbers	Alma McGregor	
1930	The Social Lion	Society Girl	Uncredited
1930	Raffles	Gwen's Friend	Uncredited
1930	Let's Go Native	Wendell Sr.'s Secretary	Uncredited
1930	Follow Thru	Bit in Ladies Locker Room	Uncredited
1930	Whoopee!	Goldwyn Girl	Uncredited
1931	Hell Divers	Girl	(scenes deleted)
1932	The Miracle Man	Margaret Thornton	
1932	Sky Bride	Ruth Dunning	
1932	Winner Take All	Joan Gibson	
1932	Downstairs	Anna	
1932	Kongo	Ann Whitehall	
1934	Jane Eyre	Jane Eyre	
1934	Dangerous Corner	Ann Peel	
1934	The Mighty Barnum	Jenny Lind	
1935	Society Doctor	Madge	
1935	Shadow of Doubt	Trenna Plaice	
1935	Times Square Lady	Toni Bradley	
1935	Let 'Em Have It	Eleanor Spencer	
1935	Escapade	Gerta	
1935	The Murder Man	Mary Shannon	
1935	Here Comes the Band	Margaret Jones	
1935	Metropolitan	Anne Merrill	
1936	The Garden Murder Case	Zalia Graem	
1936	The Great Ziegfeld	Audrey Dane	
1936	Born to Dance	Lucy James	
1937	Women of Glamour	Gloria Hudson	
1937	When Love Is Young	Wanda Werner	
1937	Between Two Women	Patricia Sloan	
1937	Wife, Doctor and Nurse	Steve aka Miss Stephens	
1937	The Bad Man of Brimstone	Loretta Douglas	
1938	Arsène Lupin Returns	Lorraine de Grissac	
1938	The First Hundred Years	Lynn Conway	
1938	Yellow Jack	Frances Blake	
1938	Woman Against Woman	Maris Kent	
1938	There Goes My Heart	Joan Butterfield	
1938	There's That Woman Again	Sally Reardon	
1939	Let Freedom Ring	Maggie Adams	
1939	Society Lawyer	Pat Abbott	
1939	Stronger Than Desire	Elizabeth Flagg	
1940	Flight Angels	Mary Norvell	
1940	The Man Who Talked Too Much	Joan Reed	
1940	Hired Wife	Phyllis Walden	
1940	The Invisible Woman	Kitty Carroll	
1941	Adventure in Washington	Jane Scott	Alternative title: Female Correspondent
1942	Butch Minds the Baby	Susie O'Neill	
1942	Pardon My Sarong	Joan Marshall	
1942	Careful, Soft Shoulder	Connie Mathers	
1944	Action in Arabia	Yvonne Danesco	
1944	Brazil	Nicky Henderson	Alternative title: Stars and Guitars
1945	Love, Honor and Goodbye	Roberta Baxter	
1948	Night Has a Thousand Eyes	Jenny Courtland	
1949	State Department: File 649	Margaret "Marge" Weldon	Alternative title: Assignment in China
1954	Salgin	Nurse	Alternative titles: Epidemic; Istanbul
1955	Reluctant Bride	Laura Weeks	Alternative title: Two Grooms for a Bride
1960	Strangers When We Meet	Mrs. Wagner	
1981	Madame Wang's	Madame Wang	

== Partial TV credits ==
Year	Title	Role	Episode(s)
1953	General Electric Theater	Adele	1 episode
1955	Letter to Loretta	Dee Norman	1 episode
1955	Science Fiction Theatre	Dr. Myrna Griffin; Jean Gordon	2 episodes
1957	The Ford Television Theatre	Ruth Crest	1 episode
