= Forty Deuce =

1982 film by Paul Morrissey

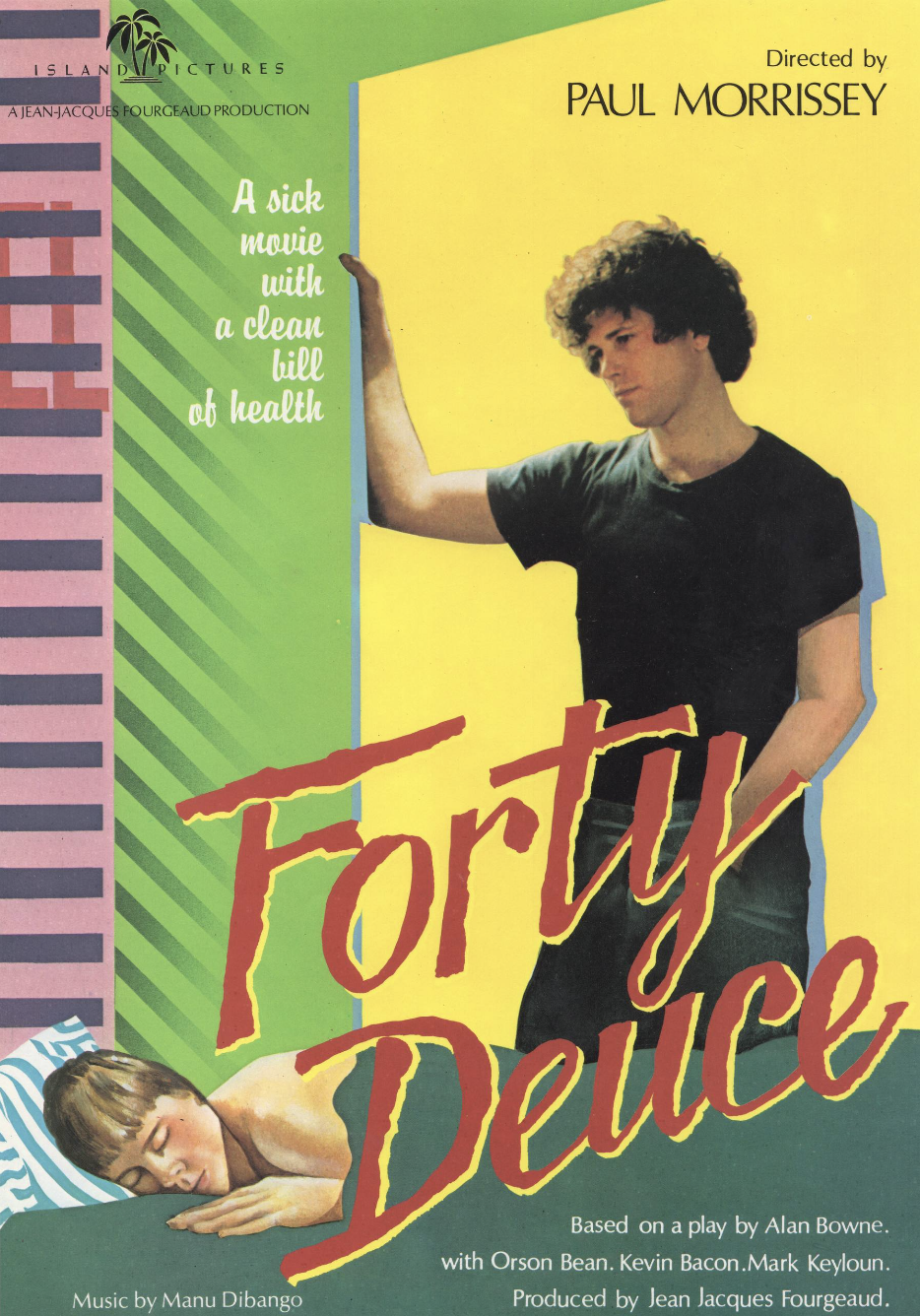
- Directed by: Paul Morrissey
- Written by: Alan Bowne
- Produced by: Steven Fierberg; Jean-Jacques Fourgeaud
- Starring: Orson Bean; Kevin Bacon; Mark Keyloun
- Cinematography: Steven Fierberg
- Edited by: Ken Eluto
- Music by: Manu Dibango
- Distributed by: Island Pictures
- Release date: November 17, 1982
- Running time: 89 minutes
- Country: United States
- Language: English

Forty Deuce is a 1982 American drama film directed by Paul Morrissey and starring Orson Bean and Kevin Bacon. It was screened in the Un Certain Regard section at the 1982 Cannes Film Festival.

== Cast ==
- Orson Bean as Mr. Roper
- Kevin Bacon as Ricky
- Mark Keyloun as "Blow"
- Tommy Citera as "Crank"
- Esai Morales as Mitchell
- Harris Laskaway as Augie (credited as Harris Laskawy)
- John Ford Noonan as John Anthony (credited as John Noonan)
- Meade Roberts as Old John
- Yukio Yamamoto as Street Hustler
- Rudy DeBellis as Toilet John
- Steve Steinlauf as Man On Phone
- Susan Blond as Escort
