= Spike of Bensonhurst =

1988 film by Paul Morrissey

- Theatrical Release Poster
- Directed by: Paul Morrissey
- Written by: Alan Bowne; Paul Morrissey
- Produced by: Nelson Lyon; David Weisman
- Starring: Sasha Mitchell; Ernest Borgnine; Anne De Salvo; Sylvia Miles; Talisa Soto; Rick Aviles
- Cinematography: Steven Fierberg
- Edited by: Stan Salfas
- Music by: Coati Mundi
- Distributed by: FilmDallas Pictures (United States); New World-Mutual Pictures (Canada)
- Release dates: September 16, 1988 (TIFF); November 11, 1988 (United States)
- Running time: 101 minutes
- Country: United States
- Language: English
- Budget: $2 million
- Box office: $623,112

Spike of Bensonhurst is a 1988 American comedy drama mafia film written and directed by Paul Morrissey and starring Sasha Mitchell. The film also features Ernest Borgnine, Maria Pitillo, and Talisa Soto. It was released in the United States on November 11, 1988 after it premiered at the Toronto International Film Festival. In the United Kingdom and other countries, the film was released with the title Mafia Kid.

== Plot ==
Spike Fumo is a young Italian-American man who lives in Bensonhurst, Brooklyn and aspires to be a boxer. He hopes to impress the local mob boss, Baldo Cacetti, so that he will become his sponsor. However, Cacetti knows Spike only competes in fixed matches, so he turns down the offer. Spike reminds Cacetti that his father went to prison for working for him, so Cacetti gives Spike a job collecting money for his numbers racket.

Spike meets the young woman Angel when she shows up to one of his boxing matches with her boyfriend, Justin. Angel also happens to be Cacetti's daughter. Cacetti makes clear to Spike that he does not want his daughter with Spike as he thinks Justin, who attends college and is the son of a congresswoman, is upwardly mobile and thus a better fit for her. Cacetti orders Spike to leave Bensonhurst, even though Angel prefers to be with him.

Spike ends up in a predominantly Puerto Rican section of Red Hook, where Bandana, one of his boxing friends, lives. Bandana invites Spike to live at his apartment. Spike is appalled at the decaying state of the neighborhood and manages to scare off loiterers and drug addicts away from the apartment building. Bandana's mother thanks him for the gesture and introduces him to her teenage daughter, India.

While living in Red Hook, Spike continues to train with Bandana at the local gym and begins a relationship with India. One day, Spike calls his friend Frankie to deliver his old boxing equipment. Frankie arrives with a now pregnant Angel accompanying him. Angel informs Spike that her father is still against their union. Soon after, Spike learns that India is also pregnant.

Back in Bensonhurst, Angel tries to convince her father that Spike could make something out of his life if only he helped him. Cacetti relents and arranges for Spike to win a fixed match in Bensonhurst. Spike believes this match is his chance to return to Bensonhurst and marry Angel. He tells India although he loves her, he cannot stay and returns to his old neighborhood. Cacetti's plan for Spike goes awry when he catches his wife Sylvia asleep in bed with Spike, though it is a misunderstanding and the two merely fell asleep together after playing cards. Cacetti orders for Spike to lose the match instead.

When Spike discovers these plans, he angrily defies them and knocks out his opponent in the first round. Angel arrives at the banquet hall with Justin. Cacetti has his men take Spike to the kitchen, where Angel pleads with her father and tells him although she does not want to marry Spike, she doesn’t want to see him murdered, either. Cacetti agrees to spare Spike's life, but he allows his men to break his right hand. Angel goes on to marry Justin and gives birth to Spike’s son. Spike returns to Red Hook, marries India, and becomes a police officer. Cacetti, having forgiven Spike, takes his grandson to visit Spike, India, and their new family.

== Cast ==
- Sasha Mitchell as "Spike" Fumo
- Ernest Borgnine as "Baldo" Cacetti
- Anne De Salvo as Sylvia Cacetti
- Talisa Soto as India
- Frank Adonis as Vinaca
- Rick Aviles as Bandana
- Antonia Rey as Bandana's Mother
- Frank Gio as Pete Fumo
- John Capodice as Mafia Eater
- Rodney Harvey as Frankie
- Sylvia Miles as Congresswoman
- Maria Pitillo as Angel Cacetti
- Justin Lazard as Justin
- Geraldine Smith as Helen Fumo

== Critical reception ==
Roger Ebert gave the film 3 out of 4 stars and said the film is "not the best comedy ever made but has energy and local color and a charismatic lead performance by Sasha Mitchell as Spike." He called Borgnine's performance the "funniest in a long time" and added, "The domestic arrangements of a middle-class Mafia household are examined here as hilariously as in Married to the Mob, and if we do not care much about the final fight by the time it comes, well, neither do the fighters." In response to claims that the movie "is generated mostly out of broad stereotypes" of Italians and Puerto Ricans, Ebert wrote, "I do not think the filmmakers or the actors had any racist intents. I think they were inspired more by the ethnic humor of TV sitcoms and movies like Saturday Night Fever." His colleague, Gene Siskel of the Chicago Tribune, had a completely different reaction, giving it 2 out of 4 stars, and calling it "a weak imitation of Saturday Night Fever with Italian family conflicts substituting for John Travolta's dancing. The stridency of the screenplay diminishes the humor in this story of another youth trying to break out of his neighborhood."

Janet Maslin of The New York Times wrote while the film "doesn't have the sharpest satirical edge...it does have personality". Kevin Thomas of the Los Angeles Times wrote the film "has to buck the truth that comedies about Italian-Americans and the Mafia are beginning to wear a bit thin. With his outrageous sense of humor Morrissey turns this seeming obstacle to great advantage only to be slowed down by too much plot. The film begins to lose steam after its first hour and becomes dragged-out. Luckily, there’s as compensation for this drawback--a roster of rousing performances. Newcomer Mitchell is a breezy charmer; Borgnine is fresh and canny in a jewel of a portrayal; Anne DeSalvo is a likeably smart cookie as Baldo’s wife, and Antonia Rey practically walks off with the movie as an exuberant Puerto Rican mother. Best of all, Spike of Bensonhurst...boasts a finish that takes your breath away in its utter lack of sentimentality." Eleanor Ringel of the Atlanta Journal-Constitution called it "a real dog of a movie, a strutting exercise in style-over- substance that’s so tickled by its own jokes that you can almost hear it giggling at itself from off-camera." Desmond Ryan of The Philadelphia Inquirer wrote that it "walks the same neighborhood as Moonstruck, but its estimation of honor and honesty in contemporary American life is strictly out of Prizzi's Honor; its motto could come from John Huston's caustic look at the Cosa Nostra, in which a capo gives this warmhearted praise for hit-woman Kathleen Turner: 'She's an American. She saw a chance to make a buck, and she took it.'" Ben Yagoda of the Philadelphia Daily News said that it "is kind of a mess. But you can't help feeling warm toward it. It has a great cast, a lot of good lines and an absolute refusal to do the expected. A plus is the sound track, which is composed of corny, wonderful pop songs from Italy." Jay Carr of The Boston Globe called the film "messy, but cheerfully tangy and winning." However, Michael Sragow of the San Francisco Examiner said that it "fails to stretch a blase manner into a satirical point of view. Now and then, one of the performers breaks out of the movie's mode of low-key archness, like Anne De Salvo (who plays the don's wife), an indestructible comedian who can't help creating an outsize character even when only a caricature is called for. In Spike of Bensonhurst, however, if the cast starts to rouse some energy, schmaltz and raucous humor, the director is sure to squelch it with a wilting piece of parody and then to put it all on cruise control. Morrissey doesn't just undercut the kind of movie he's razzing; he undercuts himself."

The film received generally positive reviews in Canada, the only other market to see a theatrical release of the film. Peter Goddard of The Toronto Star called the film "funnier than Married To The Mob, spunkier than Rocky, [and] more happily off-the-wall than Moonstruck", adding that it was " the sweetest satire of the season—one so funny you needn't always laugh at it." Marke Andrews of The Vancouver Sun called the film "coarse, cheeky and funny." John Griffin of the Montreal Gazette called the film "reactionary, racist, misogynist, derivative and dumb as dirt", but said he liked it "because it's alive; because it crackles with misguided energy; because the young actors physically will the story line back on track with performances that should take them off the welfare lines and into Hollywood immediately."

In Australia, where the film was released under the title of The Mafia Kid and went directly to video, Bill Halliwell of The Age wrote that "even though the story set-ups are as predictable as the mob cliches, [it] turns out to be nonetheless enjoyable thanks to a quick, inventive script by director Paul Morrissey and co-writer Alan Browne."

On the review aggregator website Rotten Tomatoes, 50% of 6 critics' reviews are positive, with an average rating of 5.4/10.

== Awards and nominations ==
Independent Spirit Awards

- 1989: Nominated, "Best Supporting Male" - Ernest Borgnine
