= Tinkerbelle (writer) =

American writer and television personality (1945–1986)

- Born: Jeri Lee Visser; June 23, 1945; Rye, New York, U.S.
- Died: January 22, 1986 (aged 40); New York City, U.S.
- Other name: Veronica Visser
- Occupations: Writer; actress

Tinkerbelle (born Jeri Lee Visser; June 23, 1945 – January 22, 1986) was an American writer and actress. She was associated with New York City's downtown art and nightlife scenes of the 1960s and 1970s. A regular at Max's Kansas City and part of Pop artist Andy Warhol's social circle, she began contributing to Interview magazine in 1970, writing interviews with entertainers and other public figures under both the names Tinkerbelle and Veronica Visser.

She became a television personality through her appearances on avant-garde video artist Anton Perich's public-access programs, and as the host of the syndicated film-review segment Tinkerbelle Goes to the Movies for Newsweek Video. Tinkerbelle continued writing for several publications during the 1980s, including Vogue, Details, and 212. She died by suicide in 1986, aged 40. At the time of her death, she was working on a book titled Sometimes a Someone about her experiences in New York nightlife.

== Early life and education ==
Tinkerbelle was born Jeri Lee Visser at United Hospital in Rye, New York, on June 23, 1945. She was baptized on August 12, 1945, at the Church of the Resurrection in Rye by the Reverend James F. Tully. She was the youngest of three daughters of Gerrit Visser, a house painter from Dordrecht, Netherlands, and his wife, Ann Visser (née Morris), who had been a nurse's aide at United Hospital during World War II. Her mother died of cancer when she was five years old in 1950.

Following her mother's death, Gerrit and his two youngest daughters moved in with Sophus and Grace Beldring and their two children. According to her sister Cheryl, Grace Beldring treated Visser harshly, and the experience contributed to her retreat into fantasy. As a child, she imagined herself as the actress Linda Darnell or as a fictional character named Veronica, after her favorite saint. She would later legally change her name to Veronica Visser after her father's death in 1974.

Visser attended Resurrection parochial school before entering Rye High School. During her teenage years, she developed a sharp and unconventional sense of humor, dressed in black, and wrote poetry. At 16, she began spending weekends in Greenwich Village, where she frequented the coffeehouses and cafés along Bleecker Street.

In 1962, Visser was the maid of honor at her sister Cheryl's wedding.

== Career ==
=== Early career and New York nightlife ===
After graduating from high school in 1963, Visser moved to New York City, where she pursued singing, acting, ballet, and writing through classes and workshops. She supported herself through a succession of jobs, including as a stenographer, a model for the Paraphernalia boutique associated with designer Betsey Johnson, a clipper in the press department of United Artists, and a go-go dancer at a bar in New Jersey. During a ballet class, an instructor remarked that her appearance resembled Tinker Bell from Peter Pan, and she adopted the name Tinkerbelle.

In the mid-1960s, Tinkerbelle became increasingly involved in New York's emerging discotheque scene. She frequented clubs including Ondine, Il Mio, Arthur, and the Scene, where she became part of a circle of artists, performers, and nightlife personalities. Among her friends were illustrator David Croland and model Susan Bottomly, who was known as International Velvet.

The Scene, located in a basement at West 46th Street and Eighth Avenue, became an important gathering place for the city's countercultural nightlife. Its owner, Steve Paul, became a close friend and mentor to Tinkerbelle. According to editor Danny Fields, Paul played an important role in shaping her public persona. At the club, Tinkerbelle developed the sharp, confrontational wit and improvisational style that later became characteristic of her writing and public appearances.

=== Underground scene and public-access television ===
By the late 1960s, Tinkerbelle had become a regular at Max's Kansas City, where she became acquainted with members of Pop artist Andy Warhol's Factory circle. She spent much of her time in the restaurant's back room, which attracted Warhol's Superstars, artists, performers, and other figures from New York's downtown cultural scene. Warhol was particularly amused by Tinkerbelle and became one of her early supporters.

In 1970, Tinkerbelle was invited to become a contributor to Warhol's Interview magazine, which at the time focused primarily on film. She regarded the position as her first professional writing job and devoted considerable time to preparing her interviews and writing introductions. While The Kinks were in New York City for concerts in November 1972, Tinkerbelle, Candy Darling, and Glenn O'Brien interviewed the band's frontman Ray Davies for the January 1973 issue of Interview.

In February 1973, Tinkerbelle began appearing in avant-garde filmmaker Anton Perich's public-access television programs. Tinkerbelle became one of the most recognizable personalities associated with Perich's programs, which became the subject of controversy over sexually explicit material and the limits of public-access broadcasting. In October 1973, Tinkerbelle appeared on The David Susskind Show with Perich and Susan Blond to discuss underground television.

Perich subsequently shifted the program toward coverage of New York parties and nightlife and made Tinkerbelle its principal interviewer. Using a handheld camera, Tinkerbelle interviewed celebrities and public figures at parties and other events, often employing a deliberately provocative and irreverent style. Among the celebrities she interviewed were Salvador Dalí, Cher, Yoko Ono, and former New York City mayor Abraham Beame.

=== Newsweek Video and Interview magazine ===
Newsweek Video producer John Peaslee became a regular viewer of Perich's program and was impressed by Tinkerbelle. Newsweek Video, a division of Newsweek magazine, syndicated television news features to stations across the United States. Peaslee believed Tinkerbelle would be well suited for a two-minute film-review segment and showed a recording to Bernie Shusman, the division's vice president.

Tinkerbelle was hired to host Tinkerbelle Goes to the Movies, a syndicated film-review segment that was distributed to more than 100 television markets. She delivered brief reviews in front of projected movie marquees, combining conventional criticism with puns. At the end of each review, she rated the film by ringing a small brass bell, accompanied by the sound of Big Ben. The segment also became known for Tinkerbelle's elaborate costumes and changing hairstyles. Its popularity led Newsweek Video to develop a proposed television series, Tinkerbelle's Parties, intended as a more polished version of Perich's format. The producers filmed at parties throughout New York City while developing the series.

Tinkerbelle also returned to Interview after an extended absence. Warhol had regretted her departure and repeatedly reminded executive editor Bob Colacello of her success on television. Among her interviews during this period were comedian Phyllis Diller in the March 1975 issue, actress Debbie Reynolds in September 1976, and actor Christopher Walken in August 1977.

Around this period, the London-based Boulevard magazine hired Tinkerbelle to write a column about New York nightlife. An agent at I.C.M expressed interest in representing her for television and film work, while there was discussion that filmmaker Woody Allen might cast her in an upcoming film. Television network affiliates also reviewed her Newsweek Video tapes as they considered hiring her for a regular film-review position. The opportunities gave Tinkerbelle a public profile and a more stable income. She also took a part-time job in the office of a plastic surgeon, intending to save money to rent a summer house in Southampton, New York, with her boyfriend Joel Kronfeld.

Meanwhile, Tinkerbelle's television career at Newsweek Video began to deteriorate. Tinkerbelle's Parties proved difficult to adapt from the informal style of Perich's programs to a more structured commercial production. According to Peaslee, the program lost some of the spontaneity that had made her successful on Perich's show. She also became increasingly difficult for the production staff to accommodate, arriving late, canceling tapings, and requiring numerous takes to memorize her scripts. Production times increased substantially, and in 1978 Newsweek Video dismissed her.

She continued writing for Interview, where her work was valued by Warhol. In a December 11, 1978 diary entry, Warhol said, "Tinkerbelle is so great. I don't understand why she hasn't made it to the big time." She nevertheless had disagreements with editor Colacello over her professional name. As the magazine sought to develop a more upscale image, Colacello encouraged her to write under her given name, Veronica Visser, rather than Tinkerbelle, which he associated with Warhol's 1960s circle. She agreed to publish several articles under the name Visser but preferred Tinkerbelle.

Among her later contributions to Interview were a second interview Walken for the February 1979 issue, Musician Peter Allen in June 1979, country singer Tammy Wynette in August 1979, actor Nick Nolte in September 1979, and entertainer George Burns in November 1980. In a November 10, 1980 diary entry, Warhol noted that Colacello wanted to drop Tinkerbelle from the magazine but praised her Burns interview as "a good piece of writing" and argued that "she's one of our good writers."

In 1981, Warhol recommended Tinkerbelle for a position on Paramount's new television program Entertainment Tonight, but she was not hired. She continued contributing to Interview until 1982.

=== Later career ===
In the 1980s Tinkerbelle's professional opportunities became more sporadic. She continued writing for publications associated with New York's downtown scene, including Details and 212. For an article about actor Alexander Godunov, Vogue mistakenly overpaid her. Rather than return the excess payment, she kept it and felt unable to contact the magazine for another assignment. She later wrote shorter pieces about subjects including independent coat designers and discotheque bathrooms for downtown publications.

Tinkerbelle also became involved in a dispute with attorney Richard Golub after publishing an article about gossip columnist Taki in 212. Golub had announced a $15 million lawsuit against Taki over a characterization of him as "upwardly mobile", and Tinkerbelle's article questioned the implications of the lawsuit. She later reported that Golub confronted her at Area nightclub and said he had threatened to damage her reputation.

Tinkerbelle worked as a secretary while continuing to write about New York nightlife and her social encounters. She spent several years developing an unpublished manuscript based on her experiences in New York nightlife. Initially titled Fruitflies and Other Species and later Naked Brunch, the project was eventually titled Sometimes a Somebody.

== Personal life ==
At Max's Kansas City, Tinkerbelle met rock musician Joel Kronfeld, whom she began dating. Through a friend in the fashion industry, she helped Kronfeld obtain a job in New York's Garment District. About six months later, they moved into an apartment above a restaurant on Second Avenue near East 34th Street. Although their lifestyles differed—Tinkerbelle continued to frequent New York's discos while Kronfeld preferred a quieter routine—the couple remained together, and she began spending more time at home.

After Studio 54 opened in April 1977, Tinkerbelle became a regular at the nightclub and increasingly centered her social life around its nightlife. Kronfeld later described her involvement with Studio 54 as excessive and said that the nightclub's environment contributed to changes in her behavior and relationships. Following her dismissal from Newsweek Video in 1978, Tinkerbelle's relationship with Joel Kronfeld also ended.

=== Mental health decline ===
During a trip to Los Angeles, Tinkerbelle stayed at the Beverly Hills Hotel while reportedly working on an interview with the rock group Brooklyn Dreams. She did not have a confirmed magazine assignment and charged approximately $1,700 in room-service meals to the hotel. Casablanca Records, which had arranged her accommodation, threatened legal action to recover the expenses. After returning to New York, Tinkerbelle took an overdose of pills and was hospitalized after Kronfeld contacted emergency medical services. After she recovered, Kronfeld asked her to leave their apartment. She subsequently became involved with a model who was abusive toward her. She then began attending Al-Anon meetings.

Warhol's diary also notes aspects of Tinkerbelle's personal life during this period. In a December 23, 1978 entry, he recorded: "Talked to Tinkerbelle and she was saying how she makes out with everybody she interviews, that she was making out with Christopher Walken and that his wife was getting upset. Tinkerbelle told him she cut her arm falling on the glass from a skylight—she'd broken into a friend's apartment—she thought they had some drugs in there. I guess Tinkerbelle's really wild."

By the early 1980s, changes in New York's nightlife scene had altered the social environment in which Tinkerbelle had established her career. In June 1982, she moved into a two-bedroom apartment on East 23rd Street with Jane Fredericks, whom she had met through friends at Interview. She continued to frequent the city's newer downtown clubs and described herself as "a reptile in the undergrowth of the night."

During the final year of her life, Tinkerbelle encountered a series of personal and social incidents. The Internal Revenue Service audited a $900 business deduction she had claimed for a used piano. She was dismissed by the doorman at the Palladium and actor Jack Nicholson, who she had previously met, snubbed her in the nightclub's Mike Todd Room, and attorney Richard Golub confronted her at Area over an article she wrote.

In the summer of 1985, Jane Fredericks asked Tinkerbelle to leave their apartment by October 1. Fredericks later said that she had wanted Tinkerbelle to move out for two years and described her as a "combination mother and jealous friend, and she was rubbing me the wrong way." Tinkerbelle was unable to afford an apartment of her own and made little progress in finding a new apartment

Tinkerbelle became involved with a man she met at J. S. Vandam and, for a few weeks, stayed with him in his penthouse apartment on the West Side, where he supplied her with cocaine. Soon afterward friends observed changes in her behavior. She complained of persistent nausea and became convinced that she was pregnant or had a cancerous growth in her stomach, despite no confirmed diagnosis. On one occasion, she spat on the walls and pictures in Fredericks's apartment. Friends found it difficult to determine the extent of her distress because she often responded to serious subjects with jokingly manner. She claimed to have seen the Devil, an experience she described humorously by saying that the first thing she asked him was "You call that an outfit?"

== Illness and death ==
=== Hospitalization ===
In November 1985, friends took Tinkerbelle to Bellevue Hospital in Manhattan after finding her experiencing severe anxiety and stomach pains. At the hospital, she reportedly insisted that she was actress Frances Farmer and refused to surrender her sunglasses and marabou jacket to hospital staff. Playwright Dennis Watlington, who was a patient at Bellevue at the time, later recalled that Tinkerbelle arrived with notebooks, books, and a typewriter and quickly began socializing with other patients.

The resident psychiatrist assigned to her, Michele Press, recommended that she be transferred to the psychiatric ward at University Hospital. However, Tinkerbelle's health insurance, obtained through her temporary office work, carried a $1,000 deductible that she could not afford. Friends, led by designer Belle McIntyre, organized a collection to help cover the cost of her treatment, and she was subsequently transferred to University Hospital's psychiatric ward. Her health insurance coverage was exhausted after three weeks, and she still had no permanent place to live. While Dr. Press was on vacation, Tinkerbelle was treated by resident psychiatrist Ron Manzanero. Tinkerbelle became personally attached to him, and after her discharge they began a relationship. She expressed an interest in marrying him but did not move in with him.

=== Final days and death ===
After her hospitalization, Tinkerbelle stayed with friends. In December 1985, she visited her friend David Croland, who later recalled that she appeared physically and emotionally exhausted and angry. Her friend Toby Rabiner subsequently invited her to stay in the guest bedroom of her apartment on West 111th Street for a month. During January 1986, Tinkerbelle's friends observed that she had become increasingly frail and withdrawn.

In the final days of her life, Tinkerbelle spent much of her time on a sofa reading works by Jean Cocteau. She told friends that she loved them and spoke openly about suicide, including one occasion when she said, "That window and I are having a discussion about jumping out of it."

On the morning of January 22, 1986, Tinkerbelle died by suicide after jumping from the fifth-floor window of the apartment. She was 40 years old.

== In pop culture ==
Tinkerbelle was portrayed by Hari Nef in the biographical film Mapplethorpe about the life of photographer and artist Robert Mapplethorpe.
