= Susan Blond =

American publicist and businesswoman

- Blond with Andy Warhol
- Born: May 3, 1949 (age 77) (United States) New York City, New York, U.S.
- Occupations: Founder and President of Susan Blond, Inc.
- Spouse(s): Roger Erickson (m. 1985; div. 1998); Barry Bloom (m. 2009; died 2025)
- Children: Jack Erickson
- Website: susanblondgroupinc.com

Susan Blond is an American publicist and actress. She is the owner of the entertainment and lifestyle publicity agency Susan Blond, Inc.

== Early life and career ==
Blond grew up in New York City. She studied painting as a student at the High School of Music and Art (now known as Fiorello H. LaGuardia High School of Music & Art and Performing Arts). She had a solo show at Harvard University (1971) while she attended school in Boston. She was later chosen to participate in the Whitney Museum's Independent Study Program in New York.

== Career ==
=== Andy Warhol and acting career ===
Blond returned home after college and was immediately drawn into the New York art world and Andy Warhol's Factory. Soon after Warhol re-launched Interview magazine in 1972, he saw that he had tapped into a growing publishing niche under the editorial direction of writer Glenn O'Brien. Warhol appointed Blond to launch Interview magazine's advertising arm.

Blond and Warhol developed a strong friendship, and she went on to star in Warhol's short film Phoneys (1973), which he intended to turn into a TV show. She also appeared in the infamous scene in his film Bad (1977), directed by Warhol's boyfriend Jed Johnson, where she drops a baby out of a high-rise window. She later appeared in Madam Wangs (1981) and Mixed Blood (1984), directed by former Warhol acolyte Paul Morrissey.

=== Public relations ===
Blond's first job in public relations was with United Artists, where she represented artists such as Electric Light Orchestra, Tina Turner, and Shirley Bassey, soundtracks for Blaxploitation films such as Shaft, and film scores by Ennio Morricone for the spaghetti westerns directed by Sergio Leone.

Soon thereafter, Blond moved on to Epic Records, which was owned by CBS at the time. Blond became the first female Vice President of Press & Public Information, and worked on the press campaigns of popular artists including first albums from Ozzy Osbourne, Culture Club, Cyndi Lauper, Sade, Meat Loaf and Boston. Luther Vandross and The Clash (during their seminal London Calling album) also released albums on the label under her watch. She also worked with Michael Jackson during his Bad, Off the Wall and Thriller years.

After 13 years at Epic, Blond formed her own company, Susan Blond, Inc. in late 1986, where some of her first clients included the Tunnel nightclub in New York, music industry figures such as Charles Koppelman and musicians such as Julio Iglesias and George Jones.

Blond was also the publicist for singer Morrissey, former member of The Smiths.

== Philanthropy ==
Blond has been involved with a number of cause-related organizations, including DIFFA (where she serves as board secretary), and is a frequent speaker at many Jewish cultural events.

== Personal life ==
Blond was previously married to Roger Erickson, a real estate broker, for 13 years until their divorce in 1998. They share a son named Jack. In 2009, she married Barry Bloom, a drummer real estate investor.

== Films ==
- Andy Warhol's Bad (1977) as Baby-Kiler
- Madame Wang's (1981) as Long Beach Party Giver
- Forty Deuce (1982) as Escort
- Mixed Blood (1984) as Caterer

== Media ==
- P.R. maven Susan Blond rents out her Sagaponack beach home New York Post
- Susan Blond Wins This Charming Man, Other Big Clients PR Newser
- Susan Blond dishes about Michael Jackson, Prince and Andy Warhol Newsday
- TOP THREE PARTIES: GOOD RESOURCES, IF LOOKS COULD KILT, DEPARTMENT OF THE INTERIOR Vanity Fair
- PARTY LIKE A CANUCK Vanity Fair
- "New candidate for Amy's satire". New York Daily News. April 20, 2008.
- Wild Style New York Times
