= Mixed Blood (1984 film) =

1984 film directed by Paul Morrissey

- Promo sheet for Mixed Blood
- Directed by: Paul Morrissey
- Written by: Alan Bowne; Paul Morrissey
- Produced by: Alain Sarde; Mark Slater
- Starring: Marília Pêra; Geraldine Smith
- Cinematography: Stefan Zapasnik
- Edited by: Scott Vickrey
- Music by: Coati Mundi
- Production companies: Sara Films; Set Satellite
- Distributed by: Cinevista
- Release date: 11 September 1984 (TIFF)
- Running time: 98 minutes
- Country: United States
- Language: English

Mixed Blood is a 1984 black comedy film directed by Paul Morrissey and John Leguizamo's film debut.

== Plot ==
Rita La Punta (Marília Pêra) leads a gang of Brazilian juvenile delinquents in an attempt to seize control of New York's Lower East Side's illegal drug trade from a Puerto Rican gang.

== Principal cast ==
Actor	Role
Marília Pêra	Rita La Punta
Richard Ulacia	Thiago
Rodney Harvey	Jose
Linda Kerridge	Carol
Geraldine Smith	Toni
Angel David	Juan
Roberto Luis Santana	Assassin

== Critical reception ==
The film received generally positive reviews.

Vincent Canby of The New York Times wrote:

Paul Morrissey continues to be a cinema original and his ''Mixed Blood,'' a most unorthodox look at life in the drug trade on New York's Lower East Side, is successively comic, brutal, primitive and sophisticated—a comedy with the manners of a live-action cartoon for jaded adults.

Morrisey's former collaborator Andy Warhol stated in The Andy Warhol Diaries:

Paul's movie Mixed Blood is playing midnights at the Waverly ... And I just loved the movie. It was everything he's done before, but it was photographed well and he seemed to know so much about the Lower East Side and the Alphabet—avenues A, B, C, and D—for someone who hadn't been in New York for so long.

Sid Smith wrote for the Chicago Tribune:

Although still fairly crude, the movie has more style than Morrissey's earlier pictures, and the lovely salsa score provides a biting undertone and subtlety Morrissey once avoided. It's not a perfect picture, and sometimes it's a boring one, but ''Mixed Blood'' is a fairly successful neo-realist look at something most moviemakers wouldn't go near.
