= Paul Morrissey =

American film director (1938–2024)

- Morrissey in 1967
- Born: Paul Joseph Morrissey; February 23, 1938; New York City, New York, U.S.
- Died: October 28, 2024 (aged 86); New York City, New York, U.S.
- Education: Fordham University
- Occupations: Film director, screenwriter, filmproducer
- Years active: 1961–2010
- Known for: Andy Warhol collaborator

Paul Joseph Morrissey (February 23, 1938 – October 28, 2024) was an American film director, screenwriter, and producer. He was best known for his long association with Andy Warhol and the Factory scene during the 1960s and early 1970s.

A key figure in the development of underground and avant-garde cinema, Morrissey directed a series of influential films —including Flesh (1968), Trash (1970), and Heat (1972)— that blended improvisation, social realism, and dark humor, and helped launch the careers of Warhol superstars Joe Dallesandro and Holly Woodlawn. Although closely linked to Warhol, Morrissey emphasized his own authorship and more structured approach to storytelling, distinguishing his work from Warhol’s earlier, purely improvisational films. His international reputation grew with cult classics such as Flesh for Frankenstein (1973) and Blood for Dracula (1974).

Morrissey continued directing into the 1980s, expanding his oeuvre with the gritty stage adaptation Forty Deuce (1982), the Lower East Side–set crime drama Mixed Blood (1984), and the Brooklyn comedy Spike of Bensonhurst (1988), further solidifying his place in American independent film history. In 1998, Morrissey received the Jack Smith Lifetime Achievement Award at the Chicago Underground Film Festival.

== Early life and career ==
Born in Manhattan, New York, on February 23, 1938, to Irish Catholic parents Joseph and Eleanor Morrissey, Paul Joseph Morrissey grew up in Yonkers, New York. The fourth of five children, Morrissey attended Fordham Prep and Fordham University, both Catholic schools. Upon graduation, he enlisted in the U.S. Army, going through basic training at Fort Benning and Fort Dix, achieving the rank of First Lieutenant. While in the reserves following active duty, he moved to the East Village in late 1960 and opened the Exit Gallery, a small cinematheque at 36 E. 4th St., where he programmed a mix of underground films and documentaries, including Icarus (1960), Brian De Palma's first film. Simultaneously, Morrissey began making his own short, silent 16mm comedies, including Mary Martin Does It (1962), Taylor Mead Dances (1963), and Like Sleep (1964).

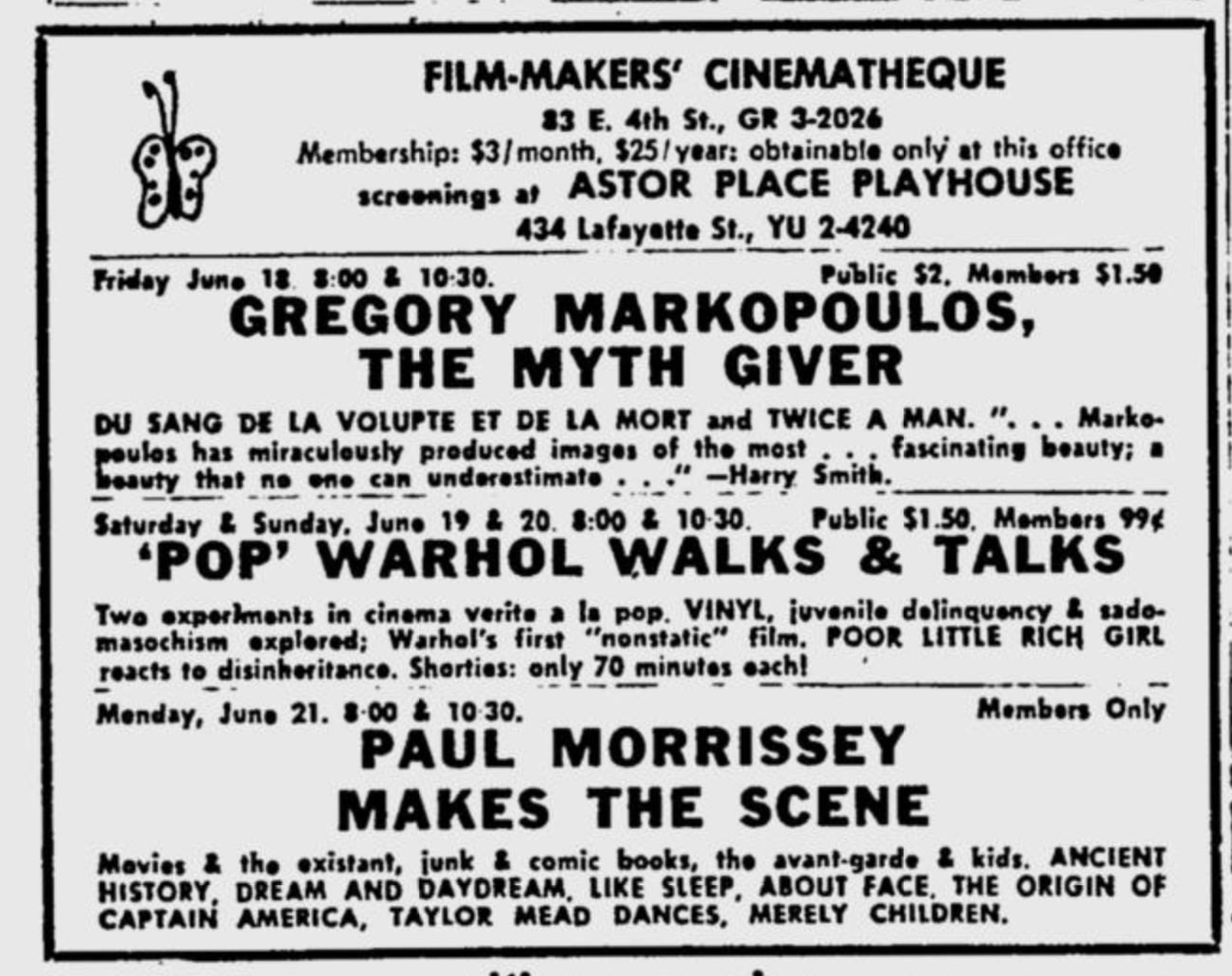
Village Voice ad for the Film-makers' Cinematheque on June 17, 1965

Introduced by poet and filmmaker Gerard Malanga, he first met Andy Warhol in June 1965 at the Astor Place Playhouse, where Morrissey was having a retrospective of his work. Taken by Morrissey's resourcefulness and filmmaking expertise, Warhol invited him to the Factory to assist him with his next project, Space, filmed at the E. 47th St. Factory in July 1965 and featuring Edie Sedgwick, Danny Fields, Donald Lyons (a friend of Morrissey's from his Fordham University days), and folk singer Eric Andersen. Several more Warhol-Morrissey collaborations followed, including My Hustler (1965), The Velvet Underground and Nico: A Symphony of Sound (1966), More Milk, Yvette (1966), Chelsea Girls (1966), Imitation of Christ (1967), Tub Girls (1967), Bike Boy (1967), I, a Man (1967), San Diego Surf (1968), and Lonesome Cowboys (1968).

Additionally, between 1966 and 1967, he managed the Velvet Underground and Nico and co-conceived and named Warhol's traveling multi-media Happening the Exploding Plastic Inevitable.

While filming a scene in John Wilcock's Manhattan apartment for Warhol's 25-hour movie Four Stars, Morrissey first met Joe Dallesandro, who had friends who lived in the same building. Morrissey immediately cast him in a scene in Loves of Ondine (1967), Dallesandro's first appearance in a Factory film.

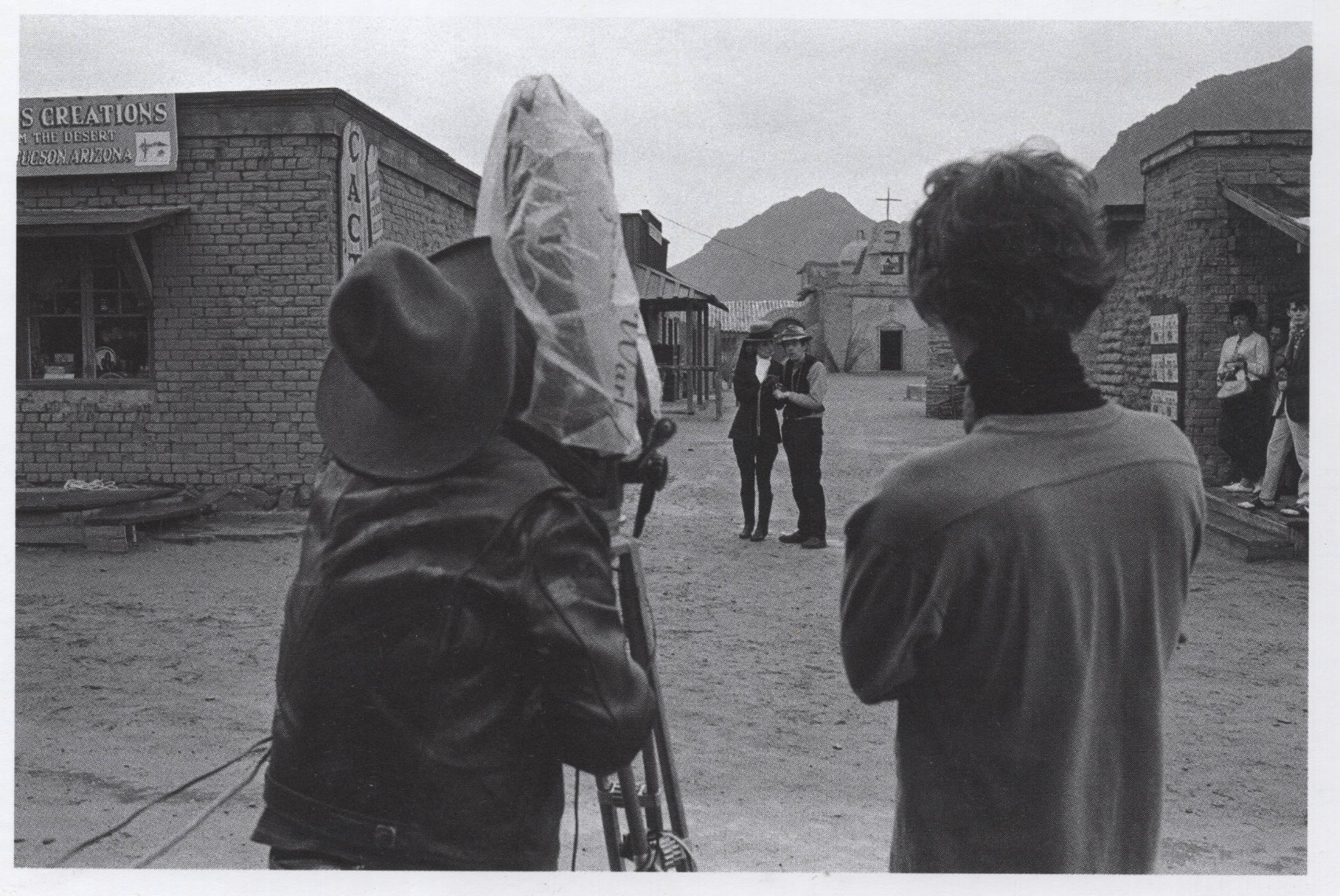
Warhol and Morrissey filming a scene of Lonesome Cowboys with Viva and Taylor Mead in Oracle, Arizona, January 1968

While Warhol was recovering from an attempted assassination in June 1968, Morrissey took over filming duties and managing the Factory. Morrissey, along with other Factory regulars, filmed a party scene for John Schlesinger's Midnight Cowboy (1969) during Warhol's hospitalization. Warhol initially endorsed the participation of his people but grew resentful at what he perceived as Schlesinger's poaching of New York's underground scene. In response, Warhol encouraged Morrissey to make a comparable film about a male hustler—although they had already made My Hustler in 1965—using Factory performers who had been largely relegated to extra roles. Morrissey subsequently directed Flesh (1968), which was shot over six weekends for under $4,000—less than one percent of Midnight Cowboy's budget.

Morrissey was determined to preserve the raw, unpolished quality of Warhol's work and explained in an interview: "My films derive from Andy's, but his were made without direction, without preparation, with total improvisation. I use a lot of that, but I add direction, story, and a bit more selectivity." He maintains, however, that the underlying approach remains the same: "We’re trying to make movies in a style that reflects the way people actually live today."

The film Flesh starred Joe Dallesandro, Geri Miller, Geraldine Smith, Jackie Curtis, and Candy Darling. It was a box-office hit in West Germany, with over 3 million tickets sold. The commercial and popular success of Flesh continued into the 1970s with two more films Morrissey directed, produced by Warhol and starring Dallesandro: Trash, featuring Jane Forth and Holly Woodlawn, the first transgender actress ever cast as the girlfriend of a lead character, and Heat, a satire about Hollywood based on Sunset Boulevard starring Dallesandro and Sylvia Miles.

Joe Dallesandro and Louis Waldon in Flesh (1968)

In 1971, Morrissey executive-produced and directed Women in Revolt, a send-up of the Women's liberation movement starring trans Warhol superstars Jackie Curtis, Holly Woodlawn, and Candy Darling. A film still of Darling from Women in Revolt appears on the cover of The Smiths' single "Sheila Take a Bow", the second time a Morrissey film appeared on the cover of a Smiths record.

Reflecting on this period in an interview with Lucy Hughes-Hallett in March 1978, Morrissey said: "To me, moviemaking is dealing with personalities, people who are always the way they are in every film, like John Wayne or Clint Eastwood, that kind of film-star personality, which is not very fashionable now. It doesn't really matter what the camera's doing as long as the people are worth watching."

== Post-Factory years ==
In March 1973, Morrissey went to Rome and directed two back-to-back features, Flesh for Frankenstein (1973) and Blood for Dracula (1974), starring Dallesandro and Udo Kier. Produced by Carlo Ponti and presented by Warhol, their international success propelled Morrissey out of the Factory and into his first and only attempt at directing a studio film, The Hound of the Baskervilles, co-written by Morrissey, Peter Cook, and Dudley Moore. It was a commercial and critical flop. Morrissey moved to Los Angeles in the late 1970s and returned to independently produced features, starting with Madame Wang's (1981), a satire of the LA punk-rock scene, starring Patrick Schoene and Morrissey's niece Christina Indri.

Madame Wang's (1981)

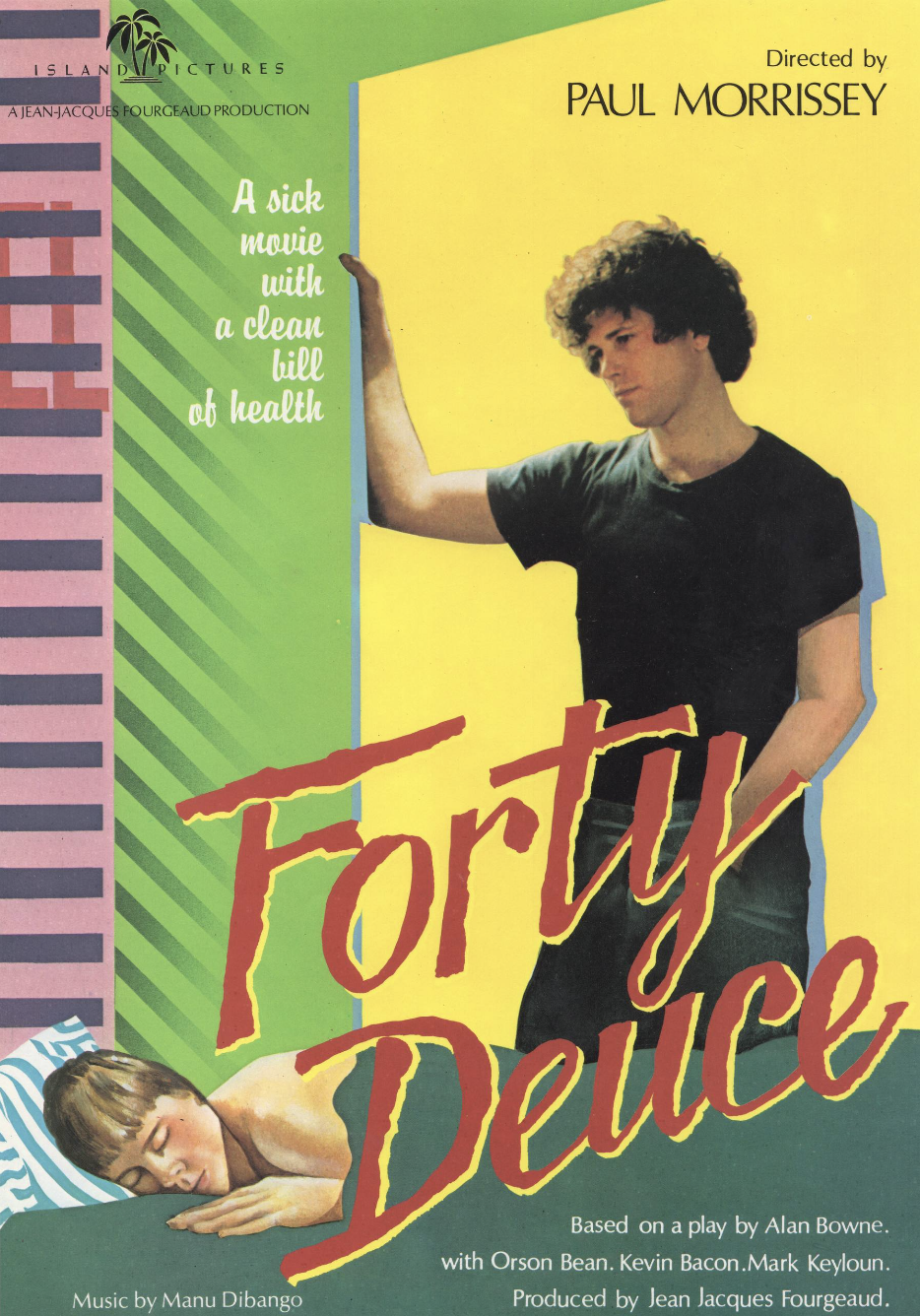
Forty Deuce (1982)

Mixed Blood (1984)

Returning to New York City in the early 1980s, Morrissey began a collaboration with playwright and screenwriter Alan Bowne, directing a film version of his 1981 play Forty Deuce (1982) starring Orson Bean and Kevin Bacon. Morrissey worked again with Bowne on the screenplays for Mixed Blood (1984) and Spike of Bensonhurst (1988), completing a trilogy of films taking a satirical, empathetic look at the political, social and moral decay of New York City and its outer boroughs during the Ed Koch years.

In later years, Morrissey was publicly critical of Warhol, saying that work attributed to Warhol was created by associates without his involvement, and expressing frustration when his films were associated with Warhol's name.

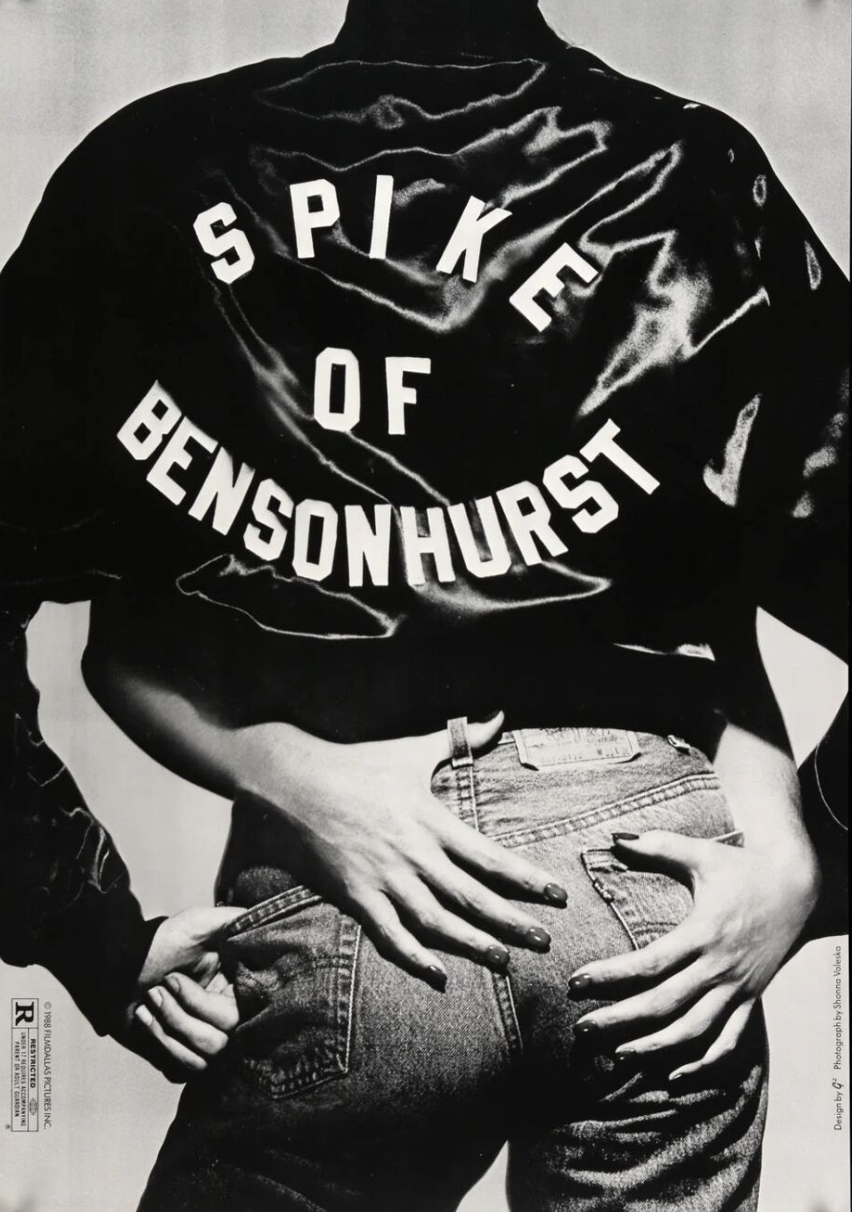
Spike of Bensonhurst (1988)

Morrissey's last feature, News From Nowhere (2010), made its U.S. debut at Film at Lincoln Center in 2011.

Speaking to screenwriter and biographer Gavin Lambert, filmmaker George Cukor said of Morrissey's work:

He makes a marvelous kind of world, and a marvelous kind of mischief, holding nothing back and just watching it happen. "Personal expression" is a much abused expression, but these films are real expression ... Nobody has done anything like it. The selection of people, the casting, is absolutely brilliant and impertinent. The life they see, the gutter they see, or the world they see is so funny and agonizing, and they see it so vividly, with such original humor.

== Personal life ==
In 1971, Warhol and Morrissey purchased Eothen in Montauk, New York, a 12-hectare oceanfront estate on the Long Island shore for $225,000. Morrissey would sell the estate in 2006 to J. Crew CEO Millard Drexler.

Bright Lights Film Journal once called Morrissey a "contradiction": a Warhol collaborator who was a "straight right-wing Catholic Republican". When film critic Jonathan Rosenbaum asked Morrissey in a 1975 interview why he portrayed drug addicts and street hustlers with such sympathy despite his conservatism, Morrissey responded: "A human being is a sympathetic entity. No matter how terrible a person might be, someone with an artist's point of view will try to render his individuality without condescension or contempt. That's the natural function of a dramatist. The movies I've made have no connection to my personal beliefs".

=== Death ===
Morrissey died from pneumonia at Lenox Hill Hospital in Manhattan, on October 28, 2024, at the age of 86.

== Filmography ==
- Ancient History (short) (1961)
- Dream and Day Dream (short) (1961)
- Mary Martin Does It (short) (1962)
- Civilization and Its Discontents (short) (1962)
- Taylor Mead Dances (short) (1963)
- Peaches and Cream (short) (1964)
- Merely Children (short) (1964)
- About Face (short) (1964)
- The Origin of Captain America (short) (1964)
- Like Sleep (short) (1964)
- All Aboard the Dreamland Choo-Choo (short) (1965)
- My Hustler (1965)
- Paul Swan (1965)
- More Milk, Yvette (1966)
- Hedy (1966)
- Chelsea Girls (1966)
- The Velvet Underground and Nico: A Symphony of Sound (1966)
- Imitation of Christ (1967)
- Tub Girls (1967)
- I, a Man (1967)
- Bike Boy (1967)
- Loves of Ondine (1967)
- The Nude Restaurant (1967)
- Four Stars (1967)
- San Diego Surf (1968)
- Flesh (1968)
- Lonesome Cowboys (1968)
- Trash (1970)
- I Miss Sonia Henie (short) (1971)
- Women in Revolt (1971)
- Heat (1972)
- L'Amour (1973)
- Flesh for Frankenstein (1973)
- Blood for Dracula (1974)
- The Hound of the Baskervilles (1978)
- Madame Wang's (1981)
- Forty Deuce (1982)
- Mixed Blood (1984)
- Beethoven's Nephew (1985)
- Spike of Bensonhurst (1988)
- Changing Fashions (short) (1993)
- Veruschka: A Life for the Camera (documentary) (2005)
- News from Nowhere (2010)
