= Make Believe Town =

American radio anthology series (1949–1951)

Make Believe Town also known as Make Believe Town, Hollywood is an American anthology radio program that presented light romantic drama. It was broadcast on CBS August 1, 1949 - December 31, 1950, and July 21, 1951 - September 8, 1951.

== Overview ==
Virginia Bruce was the hostess of the program, which featured stories about "the glamor, laughs and heartbreaks that make up the fabulous city of Hollywood". Other actors and actresses heard on the program included Howard Culver, Terry O'Sullivan, Mary Shipp, and Lurene Tuttle. Each episode was complete in itself. The announcer was John Jacobs, and Ivan Ditmars played the organ.

== Production ==
Ralph Rose was the producer; He and Frank Woodruff directed on alternate days. Writers included William Alland, True Boardman, Jean Holloway, Virginia Muller, and Charles Tazewell.

The program initially was heard weekdays at 3:30 p.m. Eastern Time, replacing Robert Q. Lewis's show. In October 1950 it was moved to Sundays at 3:30 p.m. E. T. When it returned in 1951 it was broadcast on Saturdays at 11:30 a.m. E. T. It was sustaining.

== Critical response ==
The New York Times described Make Believe Town as an attempt by CBS "to put glamor into its mid-afternoon schedule" but said the show's "main trouble ... is that some of the stories are incredible". It compared Bruce's role to that of a sideshow barker, to keep listeners from realizing that the show's title "is an understatement".

A review of the premiere episode in the trade publication Variety said that the program should please female listeners because of its combination of romance, glamor, and the Hollywood element. It cited the complete-in-one-episode nature as being appealing because listeners did not have to worry about missing something significant if they could not listen on a given day. The review said that the premiere's script, "while hokey, worked in some authentic details of the trade ..." It said that Bruce's role as hostess was an attraction but added that in the premiere "her part was scripty and weighted with cliches".
