= Metropolitan (1935 film) =

1935 American romantic drama film by Richard Boleslawski

- Directed by: Richard Boleslawski
- Written by: Bess Meredyth; George Marion, Jr.
- Produced by: Darryl F. Zanuck
- Starring: Lawrence Tibbett; Virginia Bruce
- Cinematography: Rudolph Maté; George Schneiderman
- Edited by: Barbara McLean
- Production company: Twentieth Century Pictures
- Distributed by: 20th Century Fox
- Release date: November 8, 1935
- Running time: 74 minutes
- Country: United States
- Language: English

Metropolitan is a 1935 back-stage drama film interlaced with songs and musical segments from opera.

Directed by Ryszard Bolesławski (credited as Richard Boleslawski), it featured the famous baritone Lawrence Tibbett (in his penultimate movie role), with Virginia Bruce as his leading lady. Tibbett was America's leading baritone and a major star of the New York Metropolitan Opera, where he sang more than 600 times.

Metropolitan was the first production for the 20th Century-Fox film studio, which had been newly formed from the merger of Twentieth Century Pictures and the Fox Film Corporation.

== Cast ==
- Lawrence Tibbett as Thomas Renwick
- Virginia Bruce as Anne Merrill
- Alice Brady as Ghita Galin
- Cesar Romero as Niki Baroni
- Thurston Hall as T. Simon Hunter
- Luis Alberni as Ugo Pizzi
- George F. Marion as Papa Perontelli
- Adrian Rosley as Tolentino
- Christian Rub as Weidel
- Franklyn Ardell as Marco
- Etienne Girardot as Nello
- Jessie Ralph as Charwoman
- Jane Darwell as Grandma
- Walter Brennan as Grandpa
- Gladys Earlcott as Wardrobe woman
- Adrian Morris as Electrician

== Production ==
=== Release ===
This was the first film production for the 20th Century-Fox Film Corporation, which was newly formed through the merger of the Fox Film Corporation and Twentieth Century Pictures.

== Critical reception ==
Andre Sennwald of the The New York Times stated that the film "is very likely the best musical film of the season", and commented that its "special triumph is its conclusive demonstration that it is possible for a musical picture to end too soon." Sennwald expressed appreciation that the director allowed Tibbett to "hold the screen for fairly lengthy intervals, thereby permitting us to savor the full emotional richness of the music." He also wrote approvingly of the other performers : "Alice Brady gives a gloriously demented performance as the temperamental diva. Virginia Bruce, whose timing in The Great Barnum [sic] was so perfect that spectators refused to believe some one was singing for her, is equally effective this time as an ambitious soprano. Cesar Romero plays a debonair tenor skillfully and Luis Alberni is again hilarious as a passionately Latin music-lover. There are additional performances of excellence by George Marion Sr., Etienne Girardot, Jessie Ralph and Thurston Hall."

Variety wrote that the "dubious" script may not please all audiences, although the cast does "its yeoman best to sustain it", but Tibbett "will not disappoint." Describing him as "an engaging and robust baritone", they wrote that he is "highly impressive" and "at his vocal best."

Motion Picture Herald stated that "Lawrence Tibbett's singing is the principal entertainment and chief commercial feature", but continued to comment that Tibbett's improvement as a comedic performer, along with the support of Brady, Alberni and Marion Sr., gave the film "wide general appeal."
