= Harold Stevenson =

American painter (1929–2018)

- Harold Stevenson in his studio,1963.
- Born: March 11, 1929; Idabel, Oklahoma, U.S.
- Died: October 21, 2018 (aged 89); Idabel, Oklahoma, U.S.
- Known for: Painting
- Movement: Pop art
- Patrons: Peggy Guggenheim, Iris Clert, Andy Warhol, Alexander Iolas

Harold Moncreau Stevenson Jr. (March 11, 1929 – October 21, 2018) was an American painter known for his paintings of the male nude. He was a friend, a mentor, and an associate of Andy Warhol, and appeared in the Warhol film Heat (credited as "Harold Childe").

== Biography ==
Stevenson was born in Idabel, Oklahoma, in 1929 and attended the University of Oklahoma before moving to New York City in 1949. He moved to Paris in 1952 and exhibited at European galleries for the next 20 years.

Stevenson painted his best-known works in the 1960s, including his most famous works, Eye of Lightning Billy and The New Adam. Eye of Lightning Billy was exhibited at the Sidney Janis Gallery in 1962 as part of the "New Realists" exhibit, which included works by Warhol (including his 200 Soup Cans), Claes Oldenburg, Roy Lichtenstein, Robert Moskowitz, Robert Indiana, George Segal, Jim Dine, Peter Agostini, James Rosenquist, Wayne Thiebaud and Tom Wesselmann. The Eye of Lightning Billy was acquired by the Museum of Modern Art in 2008.

The Eye of Lightning Billy, 1962 Oil on canvas, six joined panels 120 × 180 inches; 305 × 457 cm

In 1963, Stevenson's massive mural, The New Adam, was displayed at the Iris Clert Gallery in Paris. The mural is an 8-foot by 39-foot reclining nude man. The model was young actor Sal Mineo, and the painting was dedicated to Stevenson's lover at the time, Lord Timothy Willoughby de Eresby, the heir to the Earl of Ancaster. The work was considered for inclusion in the 1963 seminal Pop Art exhibition "Six Painters and the Object" at the Guggenheim, but was considered too large, and that it would distract from the rest of the works. In 2005, the painting was acquired by the Solomon R. Guggenheim Museum.

In 1963, Stevenson created a 40-foot tall painting of the Spanish bullfighter El Cordobes, which was hung from the Eiffel Tower with the permission of the French government. The resulting traffic jam caused the government to require that the painting be taken down.

In 1968, in Paris, Stevenson exhibited "The Great Society", a collection of portraits of individuals from his hometown. The collection is now owned by the Fred Jones Jr. Museum of Art at the University of Oklahoma.

Having lived in New York, Paris, Key West and the Hamptons, Stevenson returned to his hometown of Idabel. He frequently contributed to NIGHT magazine.

Stevenson died on October 21, 2018, in Idabel, Oklahoma, at the age of 89.

== Selected works ==
- The New Adam
- The Eye of Lightning Billy
- The Great Society
- The Arm of Don Juan
