= NIGHT (magazine) =

NIGHT is an art/fashion/music/literature/nightlife periodical co-edited by Anton Perich and Robert Henry Rubin. Established in Manhattan, New York, in 1978, the magazine was created during the punk-new wave-disco nightclub era of among others; Studio 54, Xenon, Club A, Regine's, The Continental, Hurrah, Danceteria, and the Mudd Club. Today the magazine continues to focus on the beautiful, the exclusive, the intelligent and the controversial. Some of the contributors have been Charles Plymell, Helmut Newton. Taylor Mead, Harold Stevenson, Victor Bockris, Lee Klein, Charles Henri Ford and countless others.
