= Geraldine Smith (actress) =

American actress

- Born: February 11, 1949 (age 77); Brooklyn, New York, U.S.
- Occupation: Actress

Geraldine Smith (born February 11, 1949) is an American actress. Smith was associated with Pop artist Andy Warhol's Factory scene in the late 1960s and 1970s. She made her film debut as a Warhol superstar in Paul Morrissey's Flesh (1968) and later appeared in Jed Johnson's Bad (1977). She also appeared in Martin Scorsese's Raging Bull (1980), Morrissey's Mixed Blood (1984), and Spike of Bensonhurst (1988).

== Life and career ==
Geraldine Smith grew up in Brooklyn, New York. She was expelled from three Catholic schools in Brooklyn before attending Washington Irving High School in Manhattan.

As a teenager, Smith and some of her friends were walking along Bleecker Street when a girl approached them and asked if they wanted to meet the Beatles, who were visiting New York in 1964. They were taken to the Warwick Hotel, where they attended a private party with the band that continued until the early morning. Smith later recalled that she declined an invitation to go alone with Paul McCartney because she was a virgin at the time.

In his memoir POPism: The Warhol '60s (1980), Pop artist Andy Warhol recalled meeting Smith at Max's Kansas City, where she was part of a group of young women who regularly frequented the club, alongside Andrea Feldman and Patti D'Arbanville. Warhol described the three as "tiny little girl beauties." At the time, Smith was romantically involved with actor Joe Dallesandro, who, according to Smith, had asked her to marry him.

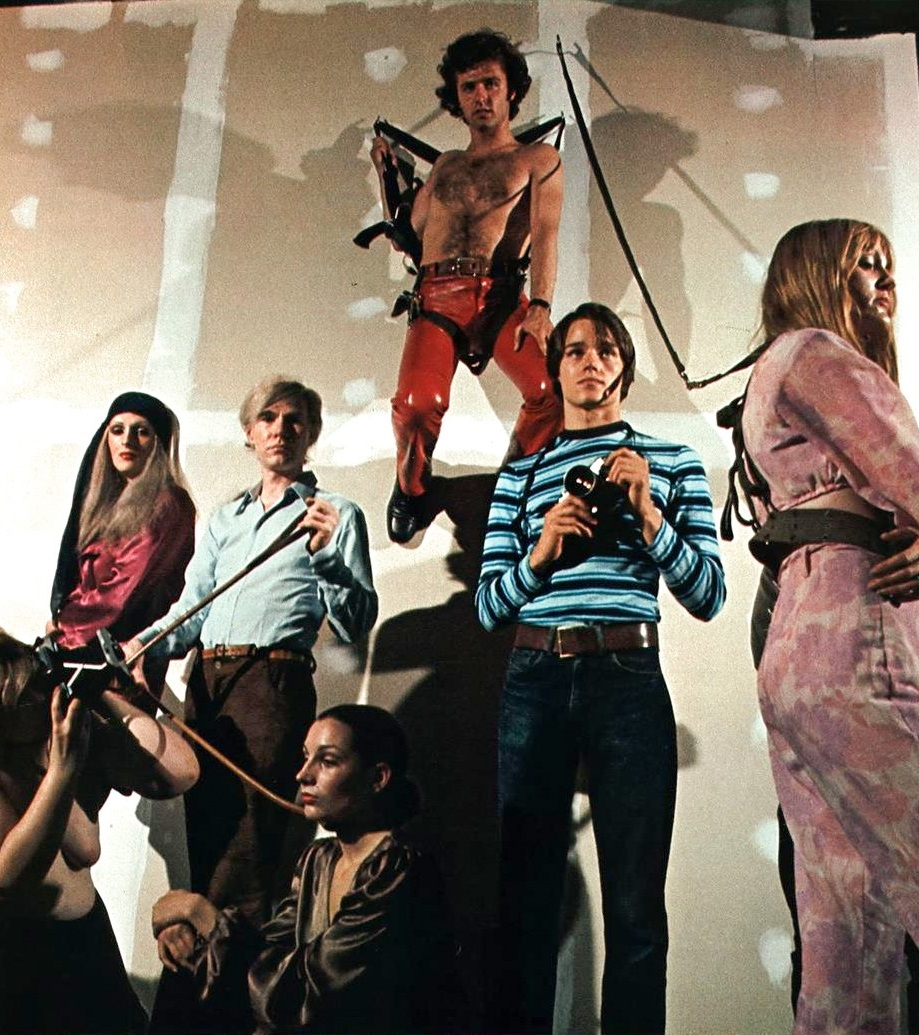
Andy Warhol and members of the Factory: Candy Darling against the wall, Brigid Berlin and Geraldine Smith on the leashes held by Warhol, Jed Johnson with a camera, Gerard Malanga hanging on the wall, and Ingrid Superstar leashed to the wall. Photo by Claude Picasso for Esquire, 1969

Smith and Feldman lived with Roberta, the wife of a wealthy man who allowed them to use her credit card for shopping. By 1968, Smith was living with Feldman in a penthouse at 94th Street and Park Avenue. Feldman's parents were frequently away, so she would stay with Feldman because "no one was ever there." Smith described Feldman as "a very generous really good person who was very disturbed."

Filmmaker Paul Morrissey approached Smith at Max's Kansas City and asked her to appear in the Warhol-produced film Flesh (1968). She made her film debut as the wife of Joe Dallesandro's character. At a screening of the film, she met transgender actress Candy Darling, who appeared in a separate scene, and the two became close friends. "She used to talk to me about woman stuff like no one else did in my life," said Smith.

In February 1969, Smith spent her 20th birthday in Los Angeles with Warhol, his boyfriend Jed Johnson, Morrissey, and others from the Warhol circle. The group had traveled to Hollywood to discuss a potential film deal with Columbia Pictures. At the Beverly Wilshire Hotel, Los Angeles Times West magazine columnist Burt Prelutsky described Smith as a "worthy" successor to Warhol superstars Viva and Ultra Violet.

In 1970, Smith was photographed with Dallesandro and fellow Warhol superstar Jane Forth by Clive Arrowsmith for the January 1971 issue of British Vogue. She was later photographed by Francesco Scavullo for his book Scavullo on Beauty (1976).

In 1977, Smith and Susan Pile interviewed Carrie Fisher, Mark Hamill, and Harrison Ford for the June 1977 issue of Warhol's Interview magazine.

Smith and her sister Maria Smith appeared in Andy Warhol's Bad (1977), directed by Johnson. Smith played the minor role in Martin Scorsese's Raging Bull (1980). She subsequently appeared in Morrissey's films Mixed Blood (1984) and Spike of Bensonhurst (1988).

== Filmography ==
Year	Title	Role
1968	Flesh	Geri
1974	The Lords of Flatbush	Student #2
1977	Andy Warhol's Bad	Glenda Montemorano
1978	The One Man Jury	Barmaid
1980	Night of the Juggler	Hooker #1
1980	Raging Bull	Janet
1984	Mixed Blood	Toni
1988	Spike of Bensonhurst	Helen Fumo
