= Mauro John Capece =

Italian filmmaker and author (born 1974)

Mauro John Capece is an Italian filmmaker and author.

== Early life ==
Mauro John Capece was born in 1974 in San Benedetto del Tronto.

== Career ==
Capece is a director, cinematographer, and screenwriter of Italian films. In 2008 Capece directed the film Alien, the Man of the Future, which debuted at the Festival des Films du Monde in Montreal. He also directed the film Evoque: Reality Show, which debuted at Rome Film Festival. In 2014 he released the film La Scultura, which features a relationship between a prostitute and a sculptor. Capece was both the director and screenwriter of the film. The film was awarded the Best Foreign Film award at the Philadelphia Independent Film Festival. The film was the first in a trilogy, followed by the films SFashion and La Danza Nera, for which he was named the best director at the Latin Independent Film Festival. He directed the 2021 streaming film Reverse, a legal thriller, which won the Silver Remi Award at the WorldFest-Houston International Film Festival 2022 for Best Low Budget Film. He is also a professor of Cinematography at Academy of Fine Arts of Bari and Academy of Fine Arts of Genova.

== Books ==
- Banana Gin (2001)
- Freaks (2002)
- Twin Towers Generation (2002)
- Lontano da Come (2005)
- Terrorism! (2008)
