= Maria Smith (actress) =

British stage actress

Maria Smith born Maria Harris a.k.a. Mrs Smith was a British stage actress of the late eighteenth century.

== Life ==
Born as Maria Harris, she married the composer Theodore Smith and may have been trained by him. She was billed as Mrs Smith throughout her career. She made her debut at the Theatre Royal, Drury Lane on 20 October 1772 and remained as a member of the company until she retired in 1796. For her first few years the company was under the management of David Garrick, with control later passing to Richard Brinsley Sheridan. In 1776 she had a son but soon eloped with a Mr Bishop who bought her husband's silence as he intended to marry her.

== Selected roles ==
- Ophelia in Hamlet (1772)
- Serina Violet in The Rose (1772)
- Clarissa in The School for Fathers (1773)

== Bibliography ==
- Highfill, Philip H, Burnim, Kalman A. & Langhans, Edward A. A Biographical Dictionary of Actors, Actresses, Musicians, Dancers, Managers, and Other Stage Personnel in London, 1660–1800: Volume VIII. SIU Press, 1973.
- The Plays of David Garrick: Volume II, 1767–1775. SIU Press, 1980.
