= More Milk, Yvette =

1966 film

- Directed by: Andy Warhol
- Written by: Ronald Tavel (scenario)
- Produced by: Andy Warhol
- Starring: Mario Montez; Paul Caruso; Richard Schmidt
- Distributed by: Andy Warhol Films
- Release date: February 8, 1966 (U.S.)
- Running time: 67 mins.
- Country: United States
- Language: English

More Milk, Yvette, also known as Mr. Stompanato, is a 1966 avant-garde film directed by Andy Warhol. Filmed at the Factory, this was Warhol's first musical venture, starring Mario Montez as actress Lana Turner.

The film is based on the story of Lana Turner, whose daughter, Cheryl Crane, came to her mother's defense and stabbed her abusive gangster boyfriend, Johnny Stompanato, to death in 1958.

== Synopsis ==
The film unfolds on a bare set with no pretense of realism. It opens with harmonica music and three figures, one resembling Bob Dylan. Lana Turner, known as the "Sweater Girl" from her role in the film They Won't Forget (1937), sings about modeling sweaters while her boyfriend Johnny Stompanato waiting at home with her "son" Cheryl—played by Richard Schmidt, who poses like a juvenile delinquent. Lana calls her maid, Yvette, who removes her sweater. When Lana asks about Johnny, Yvette replies, “Dead, maybe?” before saying that’s just “wishful thinking.” Lana then turns to Cheryl, asking why he shot Johnny, declaring her love for him.

== Release ==
More Milk, Yvette premiered at the Film-Maker's Cinemathèque at 125 West 41st Street in New York City on February 8, 1966.

The film has never been commercially released on DVD or VHS.

== Reception ==
Film critic Bosley Crowther of The New York Times described More Milk, Yvette as "a little bit of veiled allusion," in which Warhol presents two split-screen studies: one showing a "bewigged and roughed transvestite" doing a "weary and witless travesty on a movie star" beside a "tedious pantomime of a phony torture," and another of a "baby-doll blonde" being made up and dining, culminating in a shot of her “"with her head in a toilet." Crowther concludes that the ending is "an appropriate way to finish this film."

== See also ==
- Andy Warhol filmography
