= Madame Wang's =

1981 film

Madame Wang's is a 1981 film directed by Paul Morrissey.
