= Alan Bowne =

American playwright and author

Alan Bowne (1945–1989) was an American playwright and author. He was a member of the New Dramatists.

He wrote a number of plays including Beirut, Forty-Deuce, Sharon and Billy, A Snake in the Vein, and The Beany and Cecil Show, many of which are available from Broadway Play Publishing Inc. He also wrote one novel Wally Wonderstruck. He died of complications related to AIDS at the age of 44.

Perhaps his most famous and enduring work, "Beirut" is a one-act play that tells the allegorical story of a heterosexual couple dealing with a mysterious disease that ravages dystopian New York. This fictional disease presumably represented the real HIV/AIDS epidemic of the 1980s. Bowne's play Beirut was adapted to the 1993 TV movie Daybreak starring Cuba Gooding Jr and Moira Kelly.
