= Andy Warhol =

American artist and filmmaker (1928–1987)

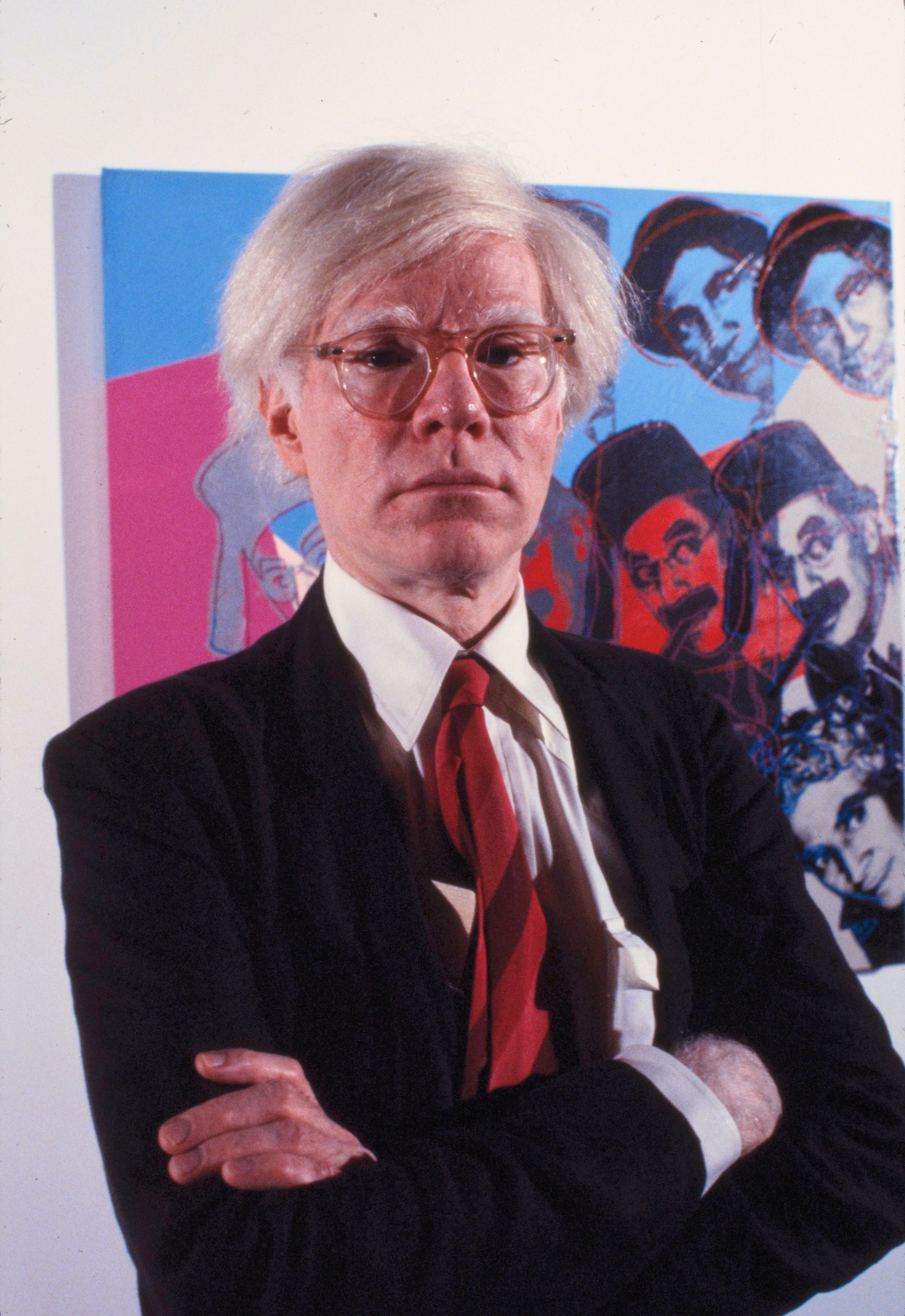
- Warhol in 1980
- Born: Andrew Warhola Jr. August 6, 1928; Pittsburgh, Pennsylvania, U.S.
- Died: February 22, 1987 (aged 58); New York City, U.S.
- Burial place: St. John the Baptist Byzantine Catholic Cemetery, Bethel Park, Pennsylvania
- Education: Carnegie Institute of Technology
- Years active: 1949–1987
- Known for: Printmaking; painting; illustration; film; photography
- Notable work: Campbell's Soup Can (1961–62); Marilyn Diptych (1962); Eight Elvises (1963); Brillo Box (1964); Empire (1964); Flowers (1964); Chelsea Girls (1966); Blue Movie (1969)
- Movement: Pop Art
- Partner: Jed Johnson (1968–1980)
- Awards: Art Directors Club Medal (1952); Art Directors Club Award for Distinctive Merit (1956); Independent Film Award (1964)

- Website: warholfoundation.org

Andy Warhol (/ˈwɔːrhɒl/; born Andrew Warhola Jr.; August 6, 1928 – February 22, 1987) was an American artist and filmmaker. Widely regarded as the most important artist of the second half of the 20th century, Warhol's practice spanned various media, including painting, filmmaking, photography, publishing, and performance art. A leading figure in the pop art movement, his work explores the relationship between advertising, consumerism, mass media, and celebrity culture. His embrace of mechanical reproduction challenged traditional boundaries between high and low culture. He is also credited with popularizing the expression "15 minutes of fame".

Born to working-class Rusyn immigrant parents in Pittsburgh, Warhol began his career as a commercial artist in New York before transitioning to fine art. Among his best-known early silkscreen paintings are Campbell's Soup Can (1961–62), Marilyn Diptych (1962), and Coca-Cola (3) (1962). In the mid-1960s, Warhol began devoting his attention to creating experimental films such as Blow Job (1964) and Empire (1965). He subsequently directed a number of underground films—including Chelsea Girls (1966), Four Stars (1967), and Blue Movie (1969)—featuring a shifting group of personalities known as Warhol superstars. His studio, the Factory, became a hub for avant-garde experimentation, bringing together drag queens, poets, bohemians, musicians, and wealthy patrons. Warhol also managed the influential rock band the Velvet Underground, who performed at his Exploding Plastic Inevitable (1966–67) multimedia events.

After Warhol survived an assassination attempt in 1968, the Factory evolved into a business enterprise. He founded Interview magazine, produced the play Pork (1971), and published various books such as The Philosophy of Andy Warhol (1975) and Popism (1980). He executed several series of paintings—notably Mao (1972–73), Athletes (1977), and Last Supper (1986)—and commissioned portraiture, while expanding into television with Andy Warhol's TV (1980–83) and Andy Warhol's Fifteen Minutes (1985–87). He meticulously documented his social life through photography and daily recordings, published posthumously as The Andy Warhol Diaries (1989). Warhol died of cardiac arrhythmia at the age of 58 following gallbladder surgery in 1987.

Warhol has been described as the "bellwether of the art market", with several of his works ranking among the most expensive paintings ever sold. In 2013, Silver Car Crash (Double Disaster) (1963) sold for $105 million. In 2022, Shot Sage Blue Marilyn (1964) sold for $195 million, the highest price ever paid at auction for a work by an American artist. Warhol has been the subject of numerous retrospective exhibitions, books, and documentary films. The Andy Warhol Museum in Pittsburgh, which holds an extensive permanent collection of his art and archives, is the largest in the United States dedicated to a single artist.

== Early life and education ==
=== Childhood (1928–1936) ===
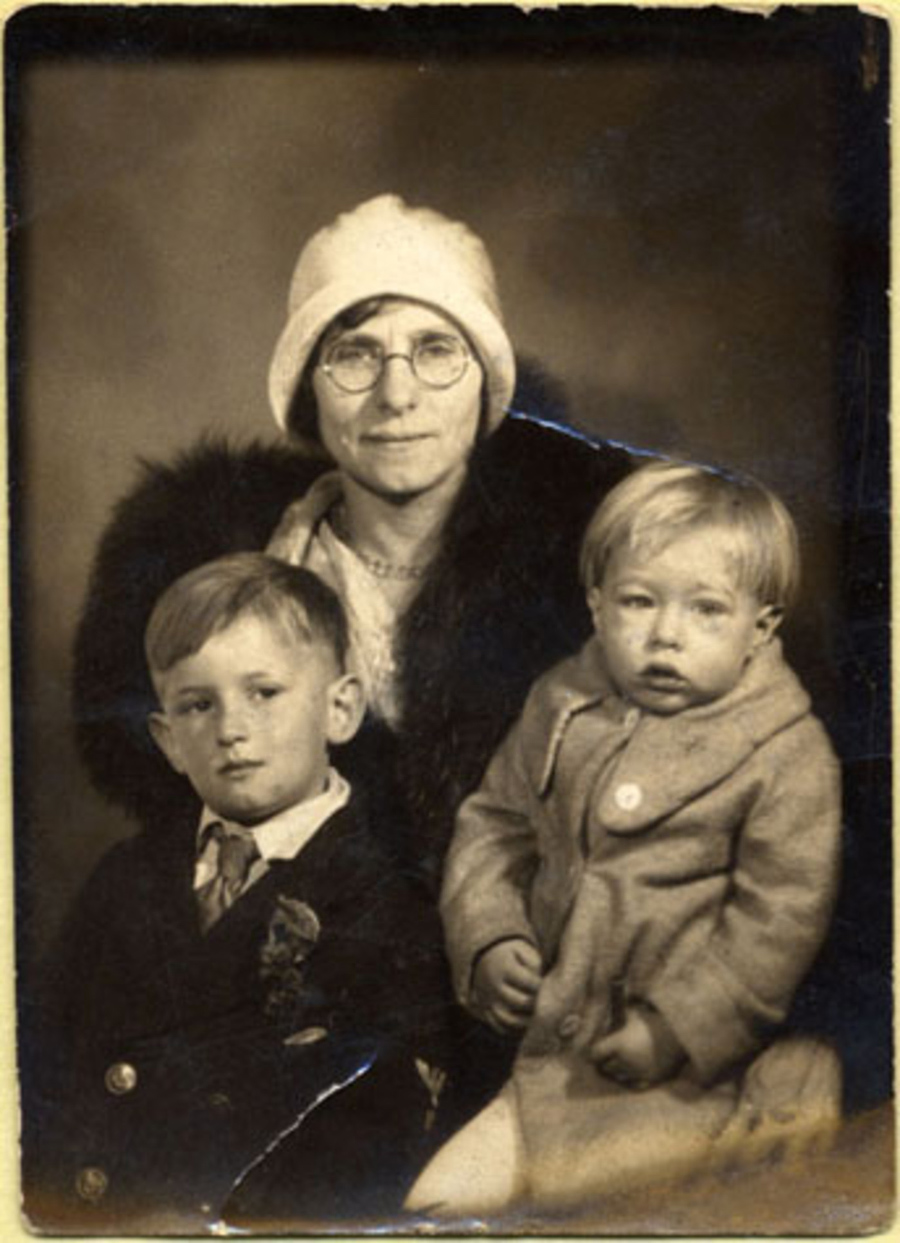
Warhol (right) as a toddler with his mother, Julia, and his brother, John, c. 1930

Andy Warhol was born Andrew Warhola Jr. on August 6, 1928, in Pittsburgh, Pennsylvania. He was the fourth child of Andrej Varchola (Americanized as Andrew Warhola; c. 1886–1942 (Note: Many European-born Rusyns lacked official birth certificates, so exact birth dates were commonly uncertain. Church metrical books record Andrew Warhola's birth as December 7, 1886, but various documents give differing information: his 1909 marriage record lists his age as 24 (not 22), the 1930 U.S. Census reports his age at marriage as 21, a 1913 insurance application gives 1887 as his birth year, and Julia Warhola told Esquire in 1966 he was 20 at marriage. By his 1924 naturalization he used 1886 but with a different month and day; his citizenship papers, draft card, death certificate, and tombstone show November 28, 1886.) and Julia Warhola (née Zavacky, 1891–1972). His parents were working-class Rusyn emigrants from Mikó, Austria-Hungary (now Miková in northeast Slovakia).

In 1912, Warhol's father emigrated to the United States and found work in a coal mine. His wife joined him nine years later in 1921. The family lived at 55 Beelen Street and later at 3252 Dawson Street in the Oakland neighborhood of Pittsburgh. They were Ruthenian Catholic and attended St. John Chrysostom Byzantine Catholic Church. Warhol had two older brothers, Paul (1922–2014) and John (1925–2010), as well as an older sister, Maria (1912; died in infancy). Warhol's nephew James Warhola, became a successful children's book illustrator.

At the age of eight, Warhol had a streptococcal infection that led to scarlet fever. Because there were no antibiotics to treat the illness, it progressed to rheumatic fever and ultimately the neurological condition Sydenham's chorea, sometimes referred to as St. Vitus’ Dance. At times he was confined to bed and made to remain home from school. He would spend these days drawing, creating scrapbooks from Hollywood magazines, and cutting out images from comic books that his mother bought him. He also enjoyed using the family's Kodak Baby Brownie Special camera, and after noticing his passion for photography, his father and brothers built a darkroom in the basement for him.

=== Education (1937–1949) ===
When Warhol started art classes at Holmes School in 1937, his teacher recognized his talent and arranged for him to attend Saturday drawing classes at the Carnegie Institute in Pittsburgh. In May 1942, as Warhol was preparing to graduate from Holmes School, his father died of tubercular peritonitis, after having years earlier drunk contaminated water from a coal mine in West Virginia.

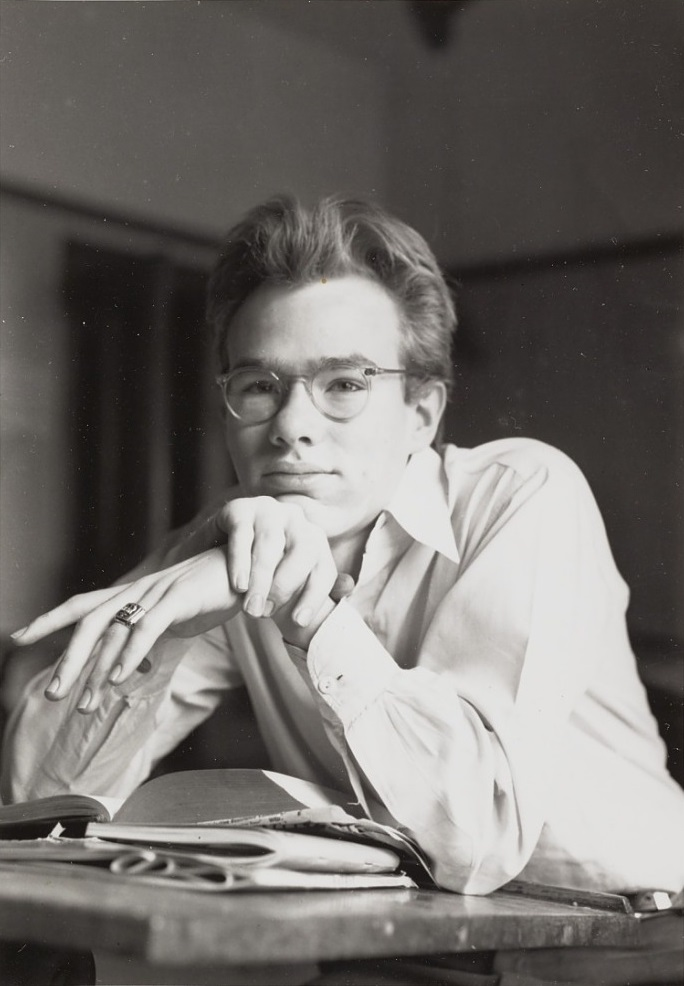
Warhol as a student at the Carnegie Institute of Technology in Pittsburgh, 1947

Warhol attended Schenley High School in Pittsburgh, where he excelled academically and artistically. His tenth-grade art teacher, Mary Adeline McKibbin encouraged him to enter a national Scholastic Corporation's art contest, which she also helped organize locally. The competition drew high school entries from across the United States, with tens of thousands of works submitted and regional selections exhibited at the Carnegie Museum of Art. McKibbin later claimed Warhol won a Scholastic award. However, biographer Blake Gopnik notes that contemporary coverage of the 1944 and 1945 contests suggests he did not receive a major prize, scholarship, or War Bond award. At most, Warhol appears to have earned an unpublicized "honorable mention," the gold pin for which he reportedly still wore in the 1980s.

After graduating from Schenley High School in 1945, Warhol won a scholarship to the Carnegie Institute of Technology in Pittsburgh. While working as a produce huckster in 1946, Warhol created a series of pen-and-ink drawings satirizing his customers and documenting social contrasts encountered during his route, from affluent to working-class families. His illustrations depicted everyday interactions and behaviors, including demands from "new rich" customers and chaotic scenes involving families and children. The series won one of the annual Leisser Art Fund awards, valued at $40, which were given annually to Carnegie Tech students for the best visual representations of their summer activities. Warhol described this job as a "wonderful experience" and said that "people are funny," offering an early indication of his interest in observing everyday behavior and social interaction.

As a student, Warhol worked part-time as a window dresser at Horne's department store and was reportedly threatened with expulsion on several occasions due to his attendance record. He also served as art director of the student art magazine, Cano, illustrating a cover in 1948 and a full-page interior illustration in 1949. These are believed to be his first two published artworks. Warhol earned a Bachelor of Fine Arts in pictorial design in 1949.

== Career ==
=== Commercial illustration and production design (1949–1955) ===
After graduating from the Carnegie Institute of Technology in June 1949, Warhol moved to New York City with his classmate Philip Pearlstein. They lived in a sixth-floor walk-up tenement building on St. Mark's Place near Tompkins Square Park in the East Village. On his second day in New York, Warhol visited Tina Fredericks, art director of Glamour magazine, whom he had met during a brief visit the previous year. He presented her with a portfolio of work from the Carnegie Institute of Technology, and Fredericks purchased a $10 drawing of an orchestra. She subsequently commissioned him to produce shoe illustrations for the September 1949 issue, marking the beginning of his career as a commercial artist. The issue featured a page of Warhol's shoe illustrations alongside pages illustrating the "ladder of success" for the magazine's feature "What Is Success?" Warhol continued contributing illustrations to Glamour and several other leading fashion magazines, including Mademoiselle, Vogue, and Harper's Bazaar, as well as doing covers for Dance Magazine and Interiors.

In the early 1950s, he befriended television designers including NBC peacock designer John J. Graham and CBS set designer Charles Lisanby, who became one of his closest companions. Lisanby said that Warhol was interested in his television work and wanted to follow artists such as Ben Shahn who occasionally worked in the medium. Around this time, Warhol met gallerist Alexander Iolas, who organized his first solo exhibition, Andy Warhol: Fifteen Drawings Based on the Writings of Truman Capote, at the Hugo Gallery in New York in 1952.

In May 1952, while working as a freelance artist, Warhol won an Art Directors Club Medal for his illustration promoting CBS Radio's Nation's Nightmare, a program about teenage drug addiction. He was subsequently featured in the organization's annual exhibition almost every year for the next decade. By 1953, CBS director of graphic design Georg Olden had named Warhol one of the twelve leading title card artists in television, citing his title design for the Studio One episode "Letter of Love." The following year, American Artist reproduced the design as an example of the program's use of established artists for television.

In 1954, Warhol exhibited his work on multiple occasions at Vito Giallo's Loft Gallery in New York. ARTnews observed that Warhol had "developed an original style of line drawing," noting that his technique produced "the effect of the reverse side of a negative, although his lines are broken and the spaces not clouded." His "blotted line" technique combined aspects of printmaking and graphite drawing on paper. Within a year, Warhol—then working out of his railroad apartment on East 34th Street—invited Giallo to become his first paid studio assistant.

In 1955, Warhol created illustrated backdrops for a television performance by jazz bandleader Duke Ellington on the CBS program Music '55. The following year he designed weather drawings for the CBS show Good Morning! with Will Rogers Jr.

=== Rise to prominence and artistic development (1955–1957) ===
In 1955, Warhol began designing advertisements for the shoe manufacturer Israel Miller. His drawings for I. Miller attracted considerable attention and earned him the Art Directors Club Award for Distinctive Merit in 1956. Photographer John Coplans recalled that "nobody drew shoes the way Andy did. He somehow gave each shoe a temperament of its own, a sort of sly, Toulouse-Lautrec kind of sophistication, but the shape and the style came through accurately and the buckle was always in the right place."

Warhol's distinctive style had made him widely recognized as a fashion illustrator. His hand-drawn images appeared regularly in high fashion magazines and the society pages of The New York Times. Art directors favored Warhol because he worked quickly, met deadlines, and readily accepted revisions. He became so busy that he had to turn down assignments.

In a 1956 interview with Mademoiselle, Warhol described his approach to combining commercial and fine art: "Every time I draw a shoe for a job, I do an illustration for myself." He acknowledged that "you almost have to specialize to get assignments," but noted that most New York art directors were eager to "give you a chance to do things." Warhol's personal illustrations were whimsical shoe designs embellished with gold leaf, and each represented a famous figure such as Truman Capote, Kate Smith, James Dean, Julie Andrews, Elvis Presley, and Zsa Zsa Gabor. They sold for $50 to $225 apiece when they were presented at the Bodley Gallery in New York in December 1956.

In 1956, the Museum of Modern Art (MoMA) politely declined Warhol's gift of his drawing Shoe, citing limited storage space and asking him to retrieve it. Nevertheless, that same year one of his shoe drawings was included in MoMA's Recent Drawings U.S.A. group exhibition, marking Warhol's first museum showing. That year, he traveled around the world with his friend, Charles Lisanby, studying art and culture in several countries. While in Kyoto, Japan, Warhol drew a stylized portrait of business tycoon Madame Helena Rubinstein.

Warhol habitually used the expedient of tracing photographs projected with an epidiascope. Using prints by Edward Wallowitch, the photographs would undergo a subtle transformation during Warhol's often cursory tracing of contours and hatching of shadows. Warhol used Wallowitch's photograph Young Man Smoking a Cigarette (c. 1956) to design for a book cover he submitted to Simon and Schuster for the Walter Ross pulp novel The Immortal, and later used others for his series of paintings.

=== Commercial expansion (1957–1961) ===
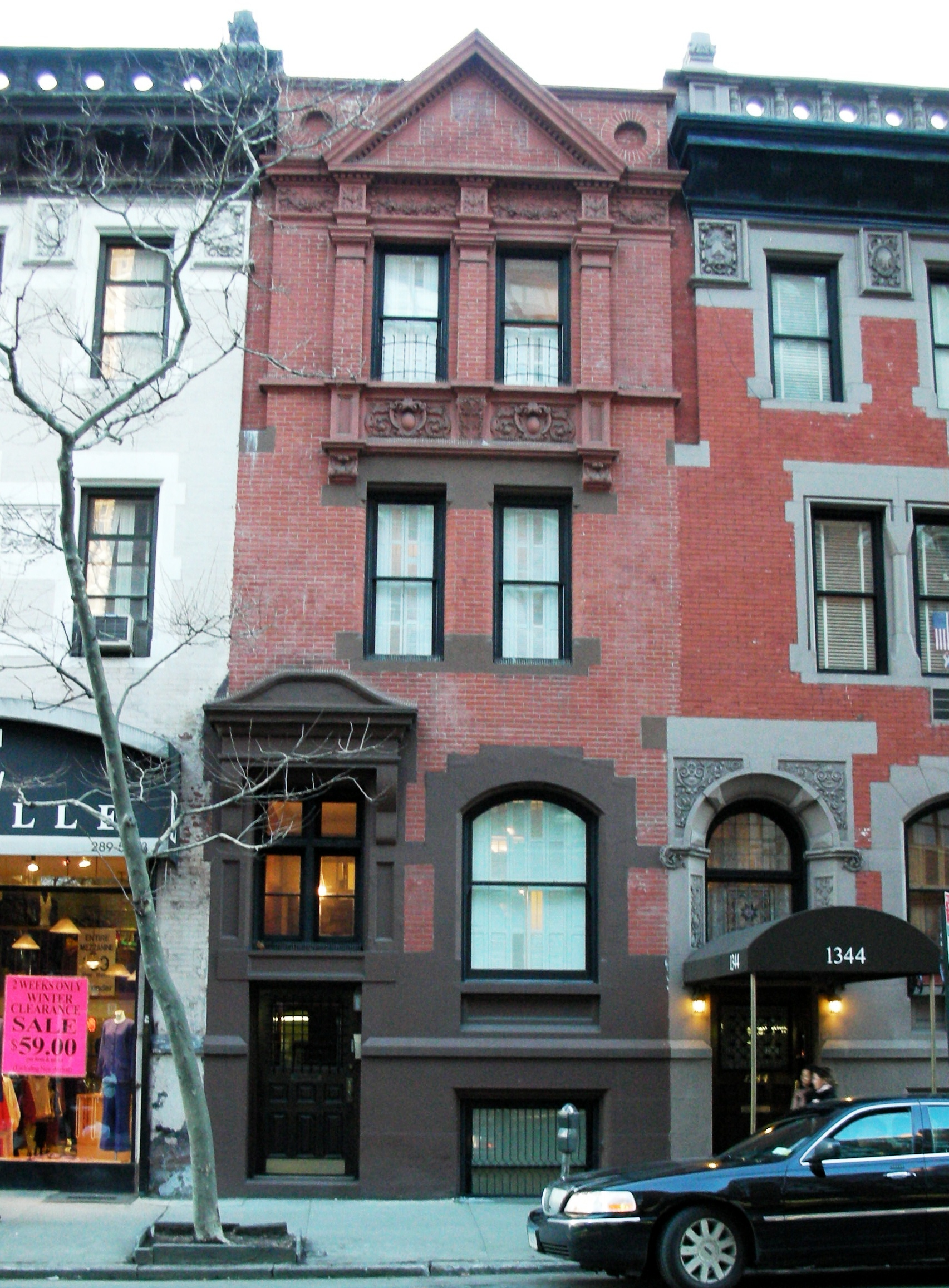
From 1960 to 1974, Warhol lived at 1342 Lexington Avenue in Carnegie Hill, Manhattan.

To promote himself as an artist, Warhol produced and distributed self-published books of his illustrations, including 25 Cats Name Sam and One Blue Pussy (1957) and A Gold Book (1957), which he gave to potential clients and contacts to generate work. He frequently incorporated calligraphy by his mother, Julia Warhola, to accompany his drawings. With the rapid expansion of the record industry, RCA Records hired Warhol to design album covers and promotional materials.

In March 1959, he participated in a fanciful exhibition of table settings at the Tiffany & Co. store in Manhattan. He created a children's party setting featuring a purple donkey with a crêpe-paper tail, gilded pop bottles, and silver porringers filled with vanilla ice cream with oversized sterling silver serving spoons beside them.

At a time when traditional artists rarely purchased the work of their peers, Warhol actively collected it. For additional income, gallery artists typically did commercial work, such as window displays, and avoided using their real names because it was frowned upon. In contrast, Warhol gained recognition as a commercial artist, which caused tension with other artists. In 1960, Warhol purchased a Victorian townhouse at 1342 Lexington Avenue, now part of the Hardenbergh/Rhinelander Historic District, in the Carnegie Hill neighborhood of Manhattan. He used the house as both a residence and a studio, and his mother lived in the basement apartment.

Warhol's work in Amy Vanderbilt's Complete Cook Book (1961) featured his illustrations at a time when photography was beginning to replace drawn imagery in commercial media. He would soon draw on his experience as a commercial artist as he transitioned to fine art.

=== Early Pop Art and silkscreen technique (1961–1962) ===
Warhol began producing paintings based on comic strips and newspaper advertisements. In April 1961, five of these works, including Saturday's Popeye, Little King, Superman, Before and After, and Advertisement, were displayed in the window of the Bonwit Teller department store on Fifth Avenue at 57th Street, serving as a backdrop for mannequins wearing spring dresses.

That year, Warhol sold paintings directly to collector Robert Scull and soon attracted major buyers such as Emily Hall Tremaine and Burton Tremaine, but dealer Ivan Karp's efforts failed to secure him gallery representation. When Karp introduced him to Leo Castelli, Castelli declined, feeling Warhol's work was too close to that of Roy Lichtenstein and concern over potential conflicts within his roster. Out of desperation, Warhol considered returning to the Bodley Gallery, but its director dismissed his new paintings as "ridiculous." Karp subsequently approached Sidney Janis, Richard Bellamy, Martha Jackson, and Robert Elkon, with only Jackson expressing interest in a future exhibition. After seeing Claes Oldenburg's storefront installation The Store in December 1961, Warhol returned home frustrated, telling friends Ted Carey and Muriel Flatow that his comic-strip paintings no longer felt original enough. Determined to create something more distinctive and impactful, he accepted Flatow's tongue-in-cheek suggestion—offered in exchange for $50—that he focus on what he liked most: money.

Drawn to the idea of mechanically reproducing currency like counterfeit cash, he began painting images of dollar bills. Seeking technical guidance, he turned to Floriano Vecchi of Tiber Press, who introduced him to the basics of silkscreen printing—transferring designs onto acetate, preparing screens, and pulling ink with a squeegee. These experiments marked a turning point in Warhol's practice and soon led to some of his earliest silkscreen works. Dealer Allan Stone took several works on consignment and offered Warhol a three-man exhibition alongside Robert Indiana and James Rosenquist, but all three artists declined, each holding out for a solo show. As Pop art gained momentum in New York in 1962, Warhol remained without major gallery representation, increasingly determined to secure his place within the emerging movement.

=== Campbell's Soup Cans and breakthrough success (1962–1964) ===
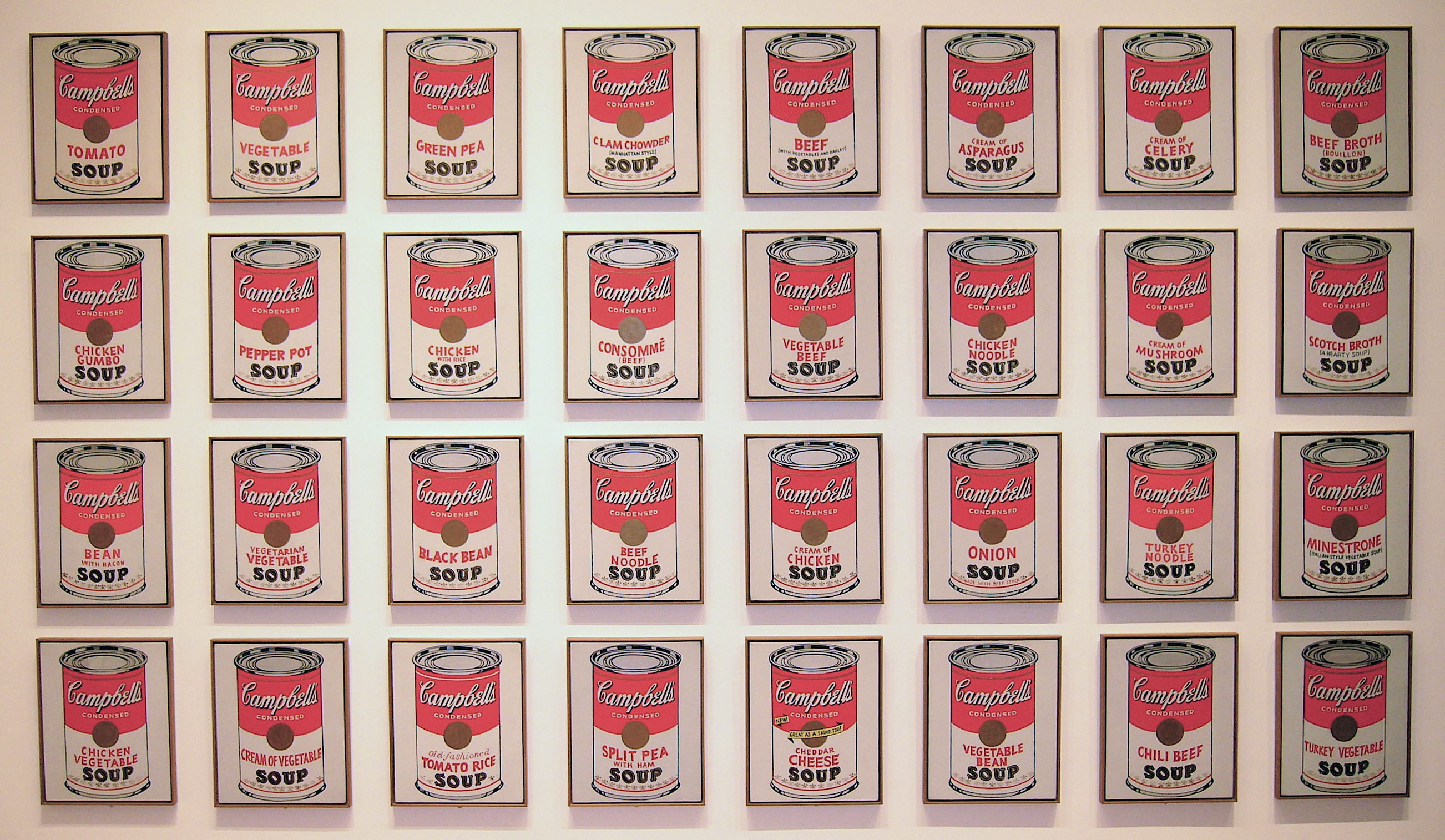
Campbell's Soup Cans (1961–62)

In May 1962, Warhol was featured in Time magazine's article "The Slice-of-Cake School," alongside Lichtenstein, Rosenquist, and Wayne Thiebaud. At the time, he was working on his Campbell's Soup Cans (1961–62) paintings and had completed sixteen of them. When Los Angeles dealer Irving Blum visited, he was surprised to learn that Warhol lacked gallery representation. With an opening available in July, Blum offered him a solo exhibition at the Ferus Gallery. Warhol sent 32 canvases to Los Angeles, each depicting a different variety of Campbell's Soup. The exhibition opened on July 9, 1962, marking his West Coast debut. During the run of the exhibition, a forthcoming December show at the Martha Jackson Gallery was canceled due to concerns about negative repercussions. Despite the cancellation, Jackson's assistant John Weber sold ten Warhol paintings that had been taken on consignment.

In July 1962, Warhol's Big Campbell's Soup Can with Can Opener (Vegetable) (1962) became the first of his soup-can paintings to enter a museum exhibition when it was shown at the Wadsworth Atheneum in Hartford, Connecticut. The following month, his painting S&H Green Stamps (1962) was included in the exhibition New Painting of Common Objects at the Pasadena Art Museum in Pasadena, California. The show featured works drawn from commercial labels, consumer goods, and advertising imagery, contributing to the movement's early critical recognition.

Warhol was invited by art dealer Sidney Janis to participate in the October 1962 exhibition, The New Realists: An Exhibition of Factual Painting & Sculpture at her New York gallery. Warhol exhibited his 1962 paintings 200 Soup Cans, Big Campbell's Soup Can 19c (Beef Noodle), and Do It Yourself (Flowers). The exhibition was widely seen as a turning point in the acceptance of Pop art; The New Yorker likened its impact on the New York art world to an "earthquake," while The Kansas City Star newspaper ran the headline, "Which Way Is Modern Art Going? Hold Your Breath and Watch the Soup Cans."

Filmmaker Emile de Antonio introduced Warhol to dealer Eleanor Ward of the Stable Gallery, who agreed to give him a solo exhibition in exchange for a painting of a two-dollar bill. Warhol's first solo New York Pop show opened there on November 6, 1962. The exhibition contained several new works, including Flavor Marilyns, Gold Marilyn Monroe, 129 Die in Jet!, Red Elvis, Troy Donahue, and 100 Coke Bottles. The show received a rave review from Michael Fried of Art International, who wrote, "Of all the painters working today in the service—or thrall—of a popular iconography Andy Warhol is probably the most single-minded and the most spectacular."

In January 1963, Warhol rented his first studio, an old firehouse at 159 East 87th Street, where he produced his Elvis series, which included the painting Eight Elvises, Triple Elvis, and Double Elvis. These works, along with a series of portraits of Elizabeth Taylor, were exhibited in the fall of 1963 at Warhol's second exhibition at the Ferus Gallery in Los Angeles. Also in 1963, Warhol was filmed in his studio for the CBS-TV special "Exhibitions: Contemporary American Painters," a survey of living American artists at work in their studios.

=== The Factory scene, expansion into sculpture and film (1964–1966) ===
By 1964, Warhol had relocated his studio to 231 East 47th Street, which became known as the Factory. During this period, poet Gerard Malanga assisted him with the production of silkscreens and films at the Factory, which was covered in aluminium foil and silver paint by Billy Name in 1964. Warhol was among the artists commissioned to create an artwork for the New York State Pavilion at the 1964 World's Fair in Queens, New York. He created the mural Thirteen Most Wanted Men (1964), which was painted over after government officials objected to the images before the fair opened in April 1964.

That spring, Warhol had his second exhibition at the Stable Gallery in the spring of 1964, which featured sculptures of commercial boxes stacked and scattered throughout the space to resemble a warehouse. For the exhibition, Warhol custom ordered wooden boxes and silkscreened graphics onto them. The sculptures of commercial cartons—Brillo Soap Pads, Del Monte Peach Halves, Heinz Tomato Ketchup, Kellogg's Corn Flakes, Campbell's Tomato Juice, and Mott's Apple Juice—sold for $200 to $400 depending on the size of the box.

A pivotal event in Warhol's career was The American Supermarket exhibition at Paul Bianchini's Upper East Side gallery in October 1964. The show was presented as a typical small supermarket environment, except that everything in it—from the produce, canned goods, meat, and paintings on the wall—was created by prominent Pop artists of the time. Warhol designed a paper shopping bag and contributed his box sculptures along with a Campbell's Soup Can painting, and genuine signed Campbell's soup cans. The exhibit was one of the first mass events that directly confronted the general public with both Pop art and the perennial question of what art is.

In November 1964, Warhol's first Flowers series was exhibited at the Leo Castelli Gallery in New York. In May 1965, his second Flowers series, which had more sizes and color variation that the previous, was shown at Galerie Ileana Sonnabend in Paris. During this trip Warhol announced that he was retiring from painting to focus on film. Warhol made a conscious decision to oppose conventional painting, stating that he no longer believed in painting. Later that year, Warhol's first solo museum exhibition was held at the Institute of Contemporary Art, Philadelphia in October 1965. In response to art dealer Ivan Karp's suggestion to paint cows, Warhol produced Cow, screenprints on wallpaper for his April 1966 exhibition at the Leo Castelli Gallery.

=== Exploding Plastic Inevitable, Chelsea Girls, and Lecture tours (1966–1968) ===
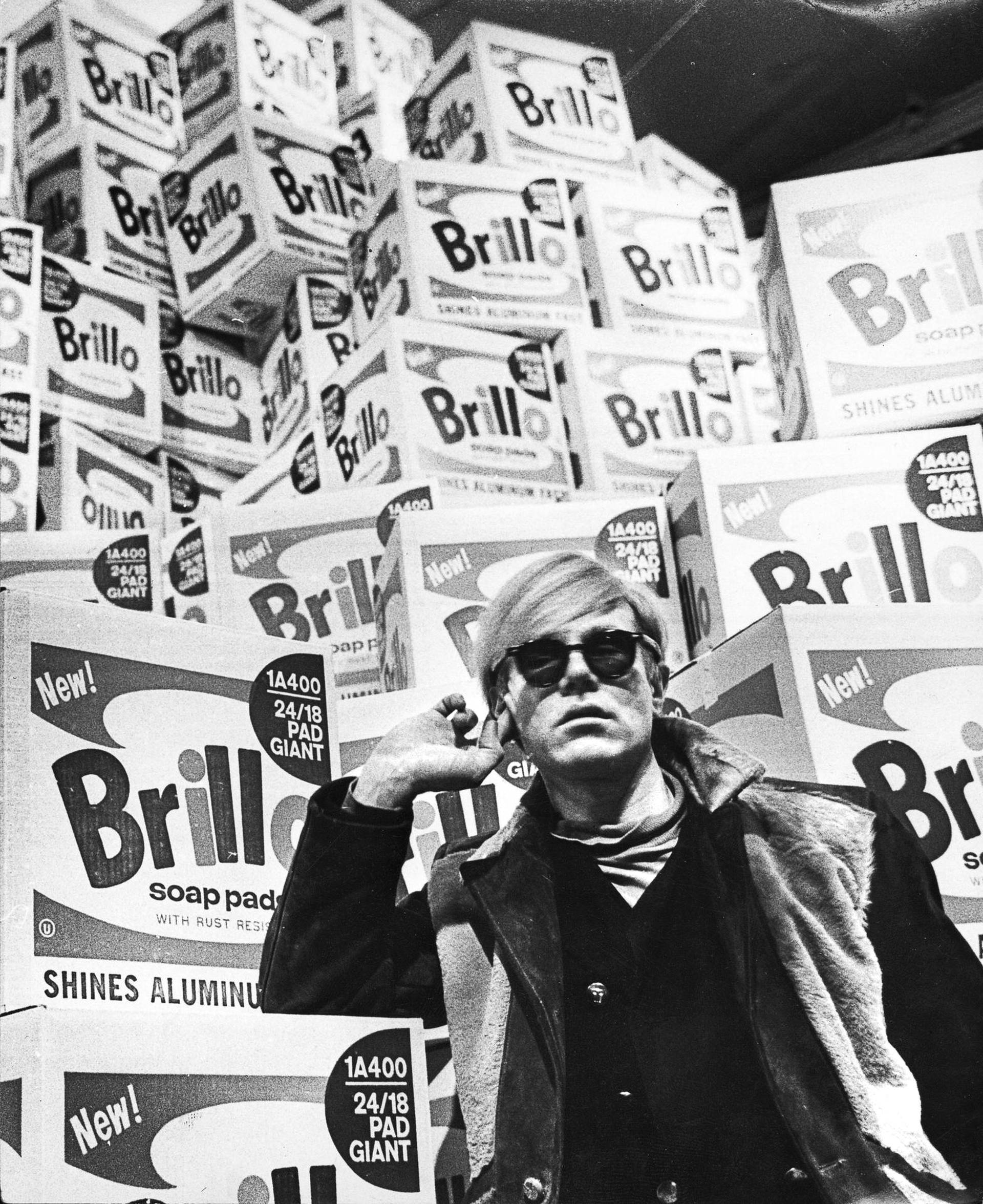
Warhol amid his Brillo Box sculptures at the Moderna Museet in Stockholm, 1968

In 1966, Warhol devoted himself to underground filmmaking and sponsoring the experimental rock band the Velvet Underground. By February, Warhol had filmed the band rehearsing at the Factory for Symphony of Sound (1966). The group also provided soundtracks for two of his films, Hedy (1966) and More Milk, Yvette (1966), and performed in a multimedia production called Andy Warhol, Up-Tight at the underground film center Cinémathèque.

Warhol also became involved with the East Village discotheque the Dom, later known as the Electric Circus. Warhol and filmmaker Paul Morrissey subleased the venue on St. Mark's Place for a month and transformed it into an immersive multimedia performance space. The venue became the home base for the Velvet Underground and the site of Warhol's Exploding Plastic Inevitable performances in April 1966. The performances were successful and Warhol took the show on the road, touring cities across the United States and Canada throughout 1966 into 1967. As the band's manager, Warhol also financed their debut album, The Velvet Underground & Nico (1967).

In October 1966, Warhol attended the opening of major survey of his work opened at the Institute of Contemporary Art in Boston. In November 1966, he was hired by the Abraham & Straus department store in Brooklyn to promote the Mars Manufacturing Company's "Paint-your-own-dress" collection, which featured white paper dresses sold with watercolors and a paintbrush. During a live demonstration at the store, Warhol painted two dresses using Nico as his model; the dresses were donated to the Brooklyn Museum.

Warhol intended to present the film Chelsea Girls (1966) at the 1967 Cannes Film Festival, but it wasn't shown because "the festival authorities explained that the film was too long, there were technical problems." Warhol's Factory became a hub for a group of "superstars," including Baby Jane Holzer, Edie Sedgwick, International Velvet, Ultra Violet, Viva, and Candy Darling, who appeared in his films and embodied his concept of fleeting celebrity. His remark that "everyone will be famous for 15 minutes" first appeared in a 1967 Time magazine article and became closely associated with the Factory scene. To finance his film productions, Warhol began going on college lecture tours, where he screened some of his underground films and answered audience questions. Warhol sent actor Allen Midgette to impersonate him during a West Coast college tour in October 1967. Warhol reimbursed the four institutions where he did not appear and returned to the campuses in 1968.

Around this time, Warhol met Fred Hughes, then working for the Menil Foundation, who soon became closely involved in his activities. At the time, Warhol had largely paused painting, but he resumed work shortly thereafter, producing the Big Electric Chair paintings for his exhibition at the Moderna Museet in Stockholm in 1968. Hughes quickly took on a central role in both Warhol's artistic and film projects, arranging a commission from the de Menils for Warhol to film a sunset as part of a project for the restoration of a bombed church in Texas. The remaining funds from that commission were used to finance Lonesome Cowboys (1968), which was filmed in Arizona.

=== Assassination attempt and recovery (1968) ===
On June 3, 1968, radical feminist writer Valerie Solanas shot Warhol and art critic Mario Amaya at the Factory. Solanas authored the SCUM Manifesto, a separatist feminist tract that advocated the elimination of men; and she appeared in the Warhol film I, a Man (1967). Amaya received minor injuries and was released from the hospital later the same day. Warhol was seriously wounded and remained in hospital for nearly two months. Solanas turned herself in to the police a few hours after the attack and said that Warhol "had too much control over my life." She was subsequently diagnosed with paranoid schizophrenia and eventually sentenced to three years in prison. Jed Johnson, an assistant who was present at the Factory during the shooting, visited Warhol daily at the hospital, and the two developed an intimate relationship. Shortly after Warhol was discharged, Johnson moved in with him to aid in his recovery and to help care for his ailing mother. Complications from a second operation the following year left Warhol's abdominal muscles improperly repaired, requiring him to wear a surgical corset for the rest of his life to prevent his stomach from distending when he ate.

During Warhol's hospitalization, Morrissey assumed primary filmmaking responsibilities and directed his first film, Flesh (1968). The Factory became more regulated, and Warhol focused on making it a structured business enterprise. He credited Morrissey with transforming the Factory into a "regular office." In August 1968, Warhol made an appearance in court after Phillip "Fufu" Van Scoy Smith, an investor in a canceled film adaptation of the Charlotte Brontë novel Jane Eyre, sued him for $80,000. A legal battle ensued for two years, ending after the backer failed to show up in court.

Warhol reemerged on the social scene in September 1968 at a party celebrating the completion of the Midnight Cowboy (1969). The film includes a party scene featuring members of the Factory that was filmed while Warhol was hospitalized. That same month, Warhol hosted a party at the Factory for the release of Nico's album The Marble Index. Warhol, alongside Viva and Ultra Violet, appeared on the cover of The New York Times Magazine for its November 10, 1968 cover story, "The Return of Andy Warhol."

=== New ventures in film, photography, publishing, theater, and commercial work (1969–1971) ===
In February 1969, Warhol and his entourage traveled to Los Angeles to discuss a prospective movie deal with Columbia Pictures. Warhol, who had always had an interest in photography, used a Polaroid camera to document his recuperation after the shooting. A few of his photographs were published in the May 1969 edition of Esquire magazine. He would become well known for always carrying his Polaroid camera to chronicle his encounters. Eventually, he used instant photography as the basis for his silkscreen portraits when he resumed painting in the 1970s.

After the release of the erotic film Blue Movie (1969), Warhol rented the Fortune Theater at 62 East 4th Street, where he screened male pornographic films from June 25 to August 5, 1969. The project was managed by Gerard Malanga under his business, Poetry on Film. The theater was called "Andy Warhol's Theater: Boys to Adore Galore." Morrissey came up with the idea to rent the theater and set the admission price at $5. Warhol and British journalist John Wilcock founded Interview magazine in the fall of 1969. The magazine was initially published as inter/VIEW: A Monthly Film Journal. It was revamped a few years later and came to represent Warhol's social life and fascination with celebrity.

In 1969, Warhol received an invitation to curate an exhibition using items from the permanent collection of the Rhode Island School of Design Museum (RISD Museum) in Providence. In October 1969, the exhibition Raid the Icebox opened at Rice University's Institute for the Arts in Houston. In 1970, the show traveled to the Isaac Delgado Museum in New Orleans before arriving at the RISD Museum. Compared to the success and scandal of Warhol's work in the 1960s, the early 1970s were much quieter years, as he became more entrepreneurial. He was generally regarded as quiet, shy and a meticulous observer. Art critic Robert Hughes called him "the white mole of Union Square". His fashion evolved from what Warhol called his "leather look" to his "Brooks Brothers look," which included a Brooks Brothers shirt and tie, DeNoyer blazer, and Levi jeans.

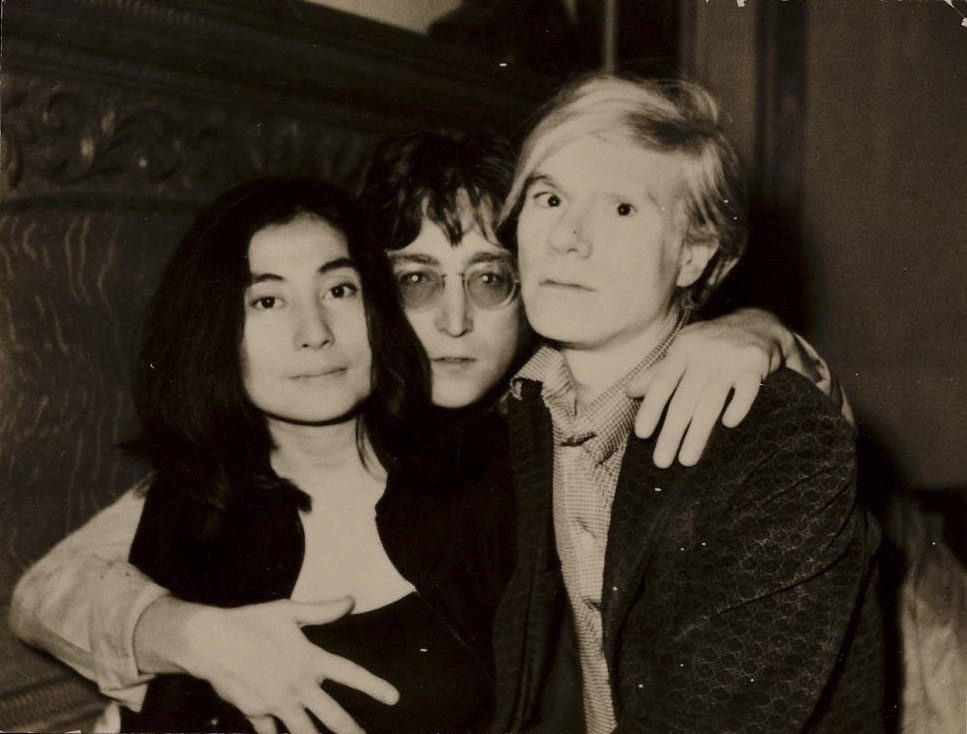
Warhol with Yoko Ono and John Lennon by David Bourdon, 1971

As Warhol continued to forge into filmmaking, he had established himself as "one of the most celebrated and well-known Pop art figures to emerge from the sixties." The Pasadena Art Museum organized a retrospective of his work in 1970. The show traveled to the Museum of Contemporary Art, Chicago; Stedelijk Van Abbemuseum, Eindhoven; Musée d'Art Moderne de la Ville de Paris; Tate Gallery, London; and Whitney Museum of American Art, New York. The Whitney exhibition in 1971 distinctly featured Warhol's Cow (1966) wallpaper as the backdrop for his paintings.

Meanwhile, Warhol produced the play Andy Warhol's Pork, which opened at New York's La MaMa Experimental Theatre in May 1971. A few months later, the controversial production was brought to the Roundhouse in London. Warhol also came up with the cover concept and did the photography for the Rolling Stones' album Sticky Fingers (1971), which features a close-up image of a man's crotch in jeans with a real zipper. He received a Grammy nomination for Best Album Cover at the 14th Annual Grammy Awards in 1972.

=== Montauk, social life, and domestic life (1971–1974) ===
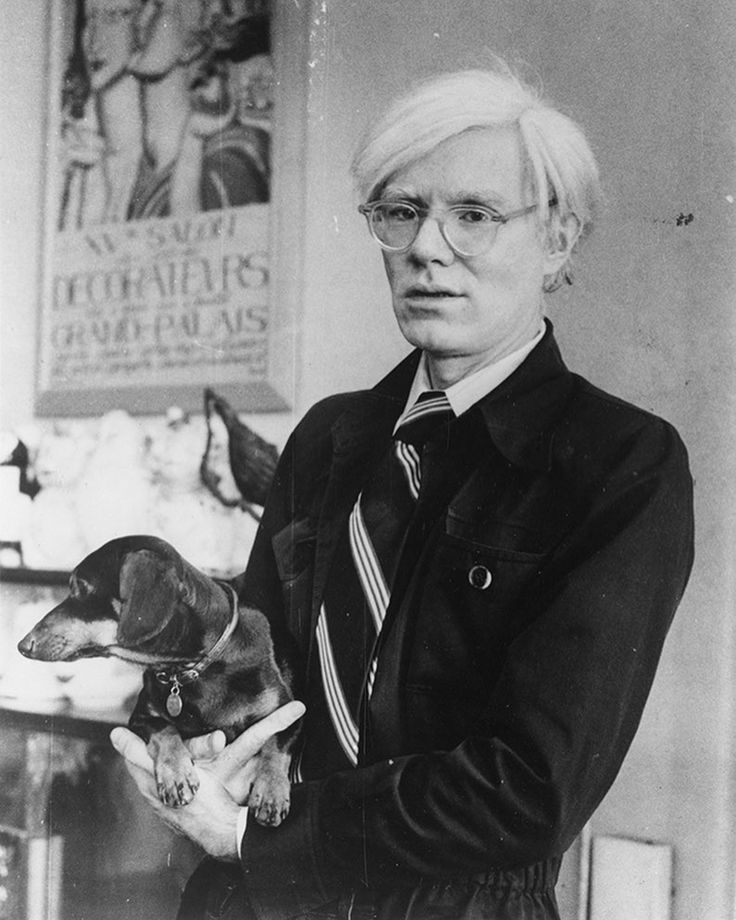
Warhol and his dachshund Archie at the Factory, 1974

In late 1971, Warhol and his business partner Paul Morrissey purchased Eothen, an oceanfront estate in Montauk, New York on Long Island. They began renting the main house on the property in 1972. Lee Radziwill, Jackie Kennedy, the Rolling Stones, Elizabeth Taylor, Truman Capote, and Halston were among the estate's guests. In 1972, Warhol planned the Halston runway presentation at the Coty Awards. Although Warhol was considered to be apolitical, he participated in an exhibition with the poster Vote McGovern (1972) in an effort to raise funds for George McGovern's 1972 presidential campaign. In October 1972, Warhol's work was included in the inaugural show at the Art Museum of South Texas in Corpus Christi, Texas. The following month, Warhol's Mao screenprints debuted at the Leo Castelli Gallery in New York.

In November 1972, Warhol and his live-in boyfriend Jed Johnson acquired a dachshund puppy they named Archie. Warhol doted on Archie and took him everywhere: to the studio, parties, restaurants, and on trips to Europe. He created portraits of Johnson, Archie, and Amos—a second dachshund that joined their family a few years later. In 1974, the couple moved into a Neo-Georgian townhouse at 57 East 66th Street in Manhattan's Lenox Hill neighborhood. By this time, Warhol's public presence had increased significantly due to his attendance at parties. In 1974, he said, "I try to go around so often so much and try to go to every party so that they'll be bored with me and stop writing about me."

Warhol began traveling more frequently to Europe during this period and developed a particular fondness for Paris after filming L'Amour (1972) around the city. He maintained an apartment on the Left Bank, on Rue du Cherche-Midi, which he shared with his business manager Fred Hughes. While in Paris, Warhol and his circle socialized with members of the city's jet set, including Karl Lagerfeld, Yves Saint Laurent, Loulou de la Falaise, and Paloma Picasso. This lifestyle shift has been attributed in part to Hughes, who sought to cultivate a more polished public image for Warhol and to position the Factory as an international social and artistic presence.

=== The Philosophy of Andy Warhol, Studio 54, and Exposures (1975–1979) ===
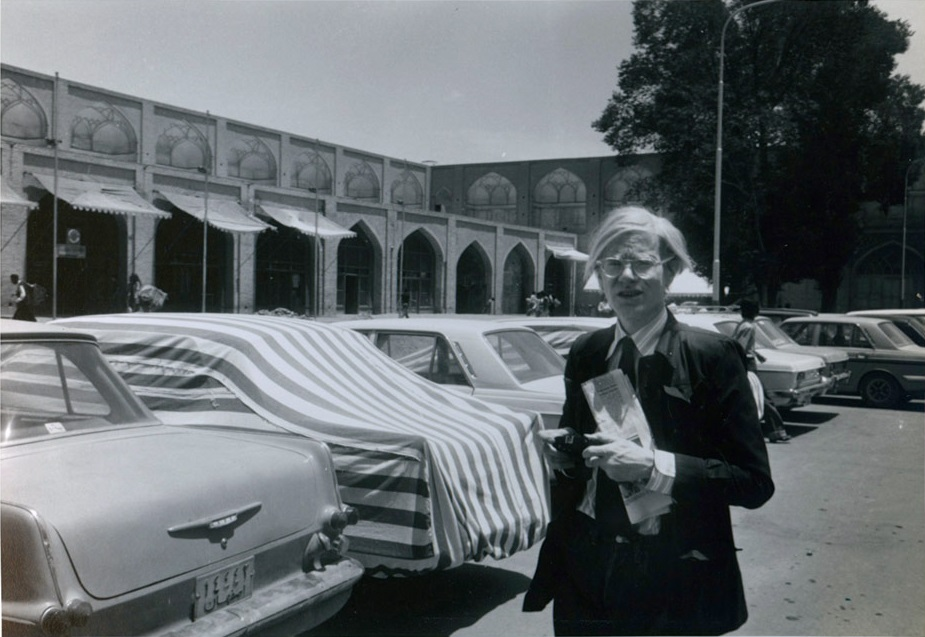
Warhol in Iran, 1976

Warhol designed the sets for the Broadway musical Man on the Moon by John Philips of the Mamas & the Papas, which opened in January 1975 at the Little Theatre in New York. In May 1975, Warhol attended President Gerald Ford's state dinner in honor of the Shah of Iran, Mohammad Reza Pahlavi, at the White House. In June 1975, the Baltimore Museum of Art mounted a major exhibition showcasing works from various periods of his career. In September 1975, he embarked on a U.S. book tour for The Philosophy of Andy Warhol (From A to B & Back Again), followed by stops in Italy, France, and England.

In 1976, Warhol and painter Jamie Wyeth were commissioned to paint each other's portraits by the Coe Kerr Gallery in Manhattan. That year, Warhol traveled to Iran to do a portrait of Empress Farah Pahlavi. He returned to the Middle East in January 1977, when he traveled to Kuwait for the opening of his exhibition at Salat Al Funoon in Dahiyat Abdullah Al-Salem.

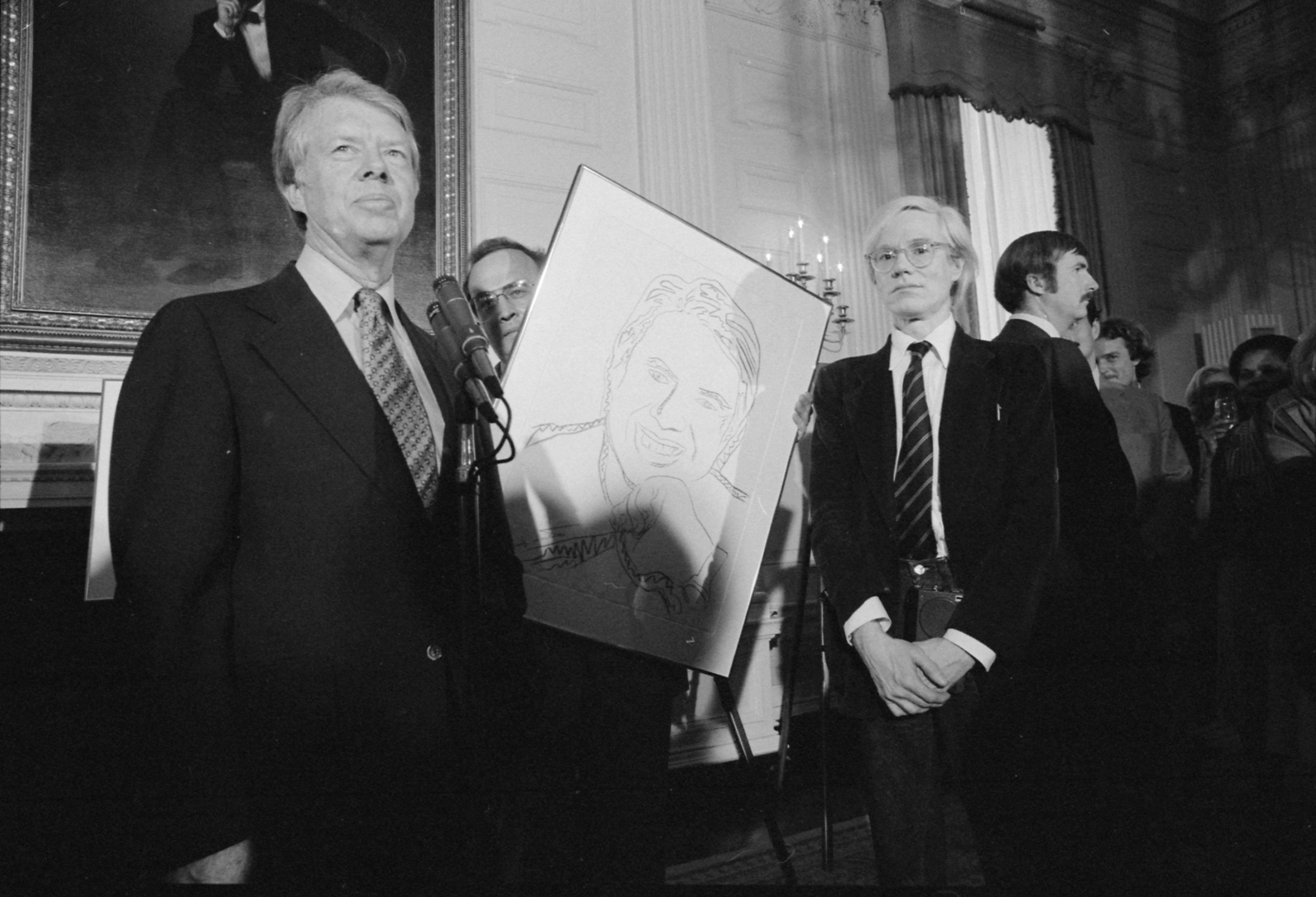
Warhol with President Jimmy Carter at the White House, 1977

The opening of Studio 54 on April 1977 ushered in a new era in New York City nightlife. Warhol was a regular and was often seen partying with his friends Halston, Bianca Jagger, and Liza Minnelli. Around this time, Warhol was taking explicit photographs of men—referred to as "landscapes"—for what became known as the Torsos and Sex Parts series. Most of the men were street hustlers and male prostitutes brought to the Factory by Halston's lover Victor Hugo. This caused tension in Warhol's relationship with Johnson, who did not approve of his friendship with Hugo. "When Studio 54 opened things changed with Andy. That was New York when it was at the height of its most decadent period, and I didn't take part. I never liked that scene, I was never comfortable. … Andy was just wasting his time, and it was really upsetting. … He just spent his time with the most ridiculous people," said Johnson.

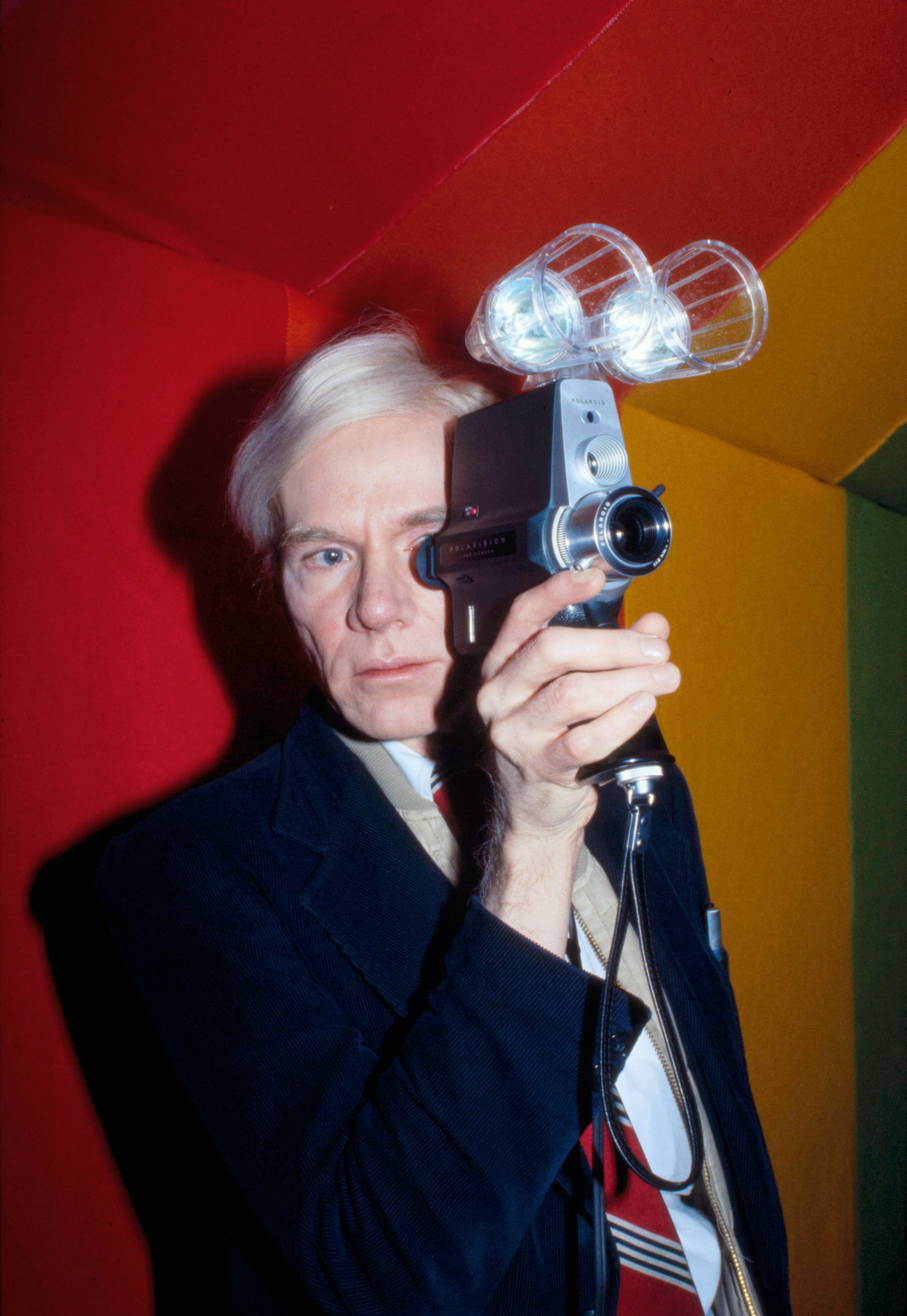
Warhol posing with a Polavision Land Camera at the Waldorf Astoria, 1978

In May 1977, Warhol and entrepreneur Geoffrey Leeds announced plans for the "Andy-Mat," a modern automat-style restaurant on Madison Avenue in New York City. Designed as a self-service dining space, the 115-seat restaurant was to feature pre-prepared frozen foods alongside luxury items such as champagne, served through pneumatic tubes, and a waitstaff would deliver orders. Warhol had total artistic control over the design, including the logo, flatware, and décor, with interiors incorporating whimsical, childlike motifs. Menu items, priced between $1 and $5.75, ranged from comfort foods like shepherd's pie to desserts and mini omelets. While the project aimed to blend everyday dining with artistic spectacle and potentially expand internationally, the restaurant was never realized.

In June 1977, Warhol was invited to a special reception honoring the "Inaugural Artists" who had contributed prints to the Jimmy Carter presidential campaign. That year, Warhol was commissioned by art collector Richard Weisman to create Athletes, ten portraits consisting of the leading athletes of the day, for an exhibition that opened at New York's Coe Kerr Gallery in December 1977.

In 1979, Warhol formed a publishing company, Andy Warhol Books, which was an imprint of Grosset & Dunlap. In October 1979, he released the photography book Exposures. The following month, he embarked on a three-week book tour before the Whitney Museum of American Art mounted the exhibition Andy Warhol: Portraits of the 70s. The exhibition showcased Warhol's portrait commissions of the decade—including Yves Saint Laurent, Gianni Agnelli, Marella Agnelli, David Hockney, Roy Lichtenstein, Brooke Hayward, Carolina Herrera, Mick Jagger, and Liza Minnelli. The show received some unfavorable reviews, with New York Times critic Hilton Kramer remarking that Warhol art "belongs less to the history of painting than to the history of publicity."

=== Popism, late-career series, and new direction (1980–1983) ===
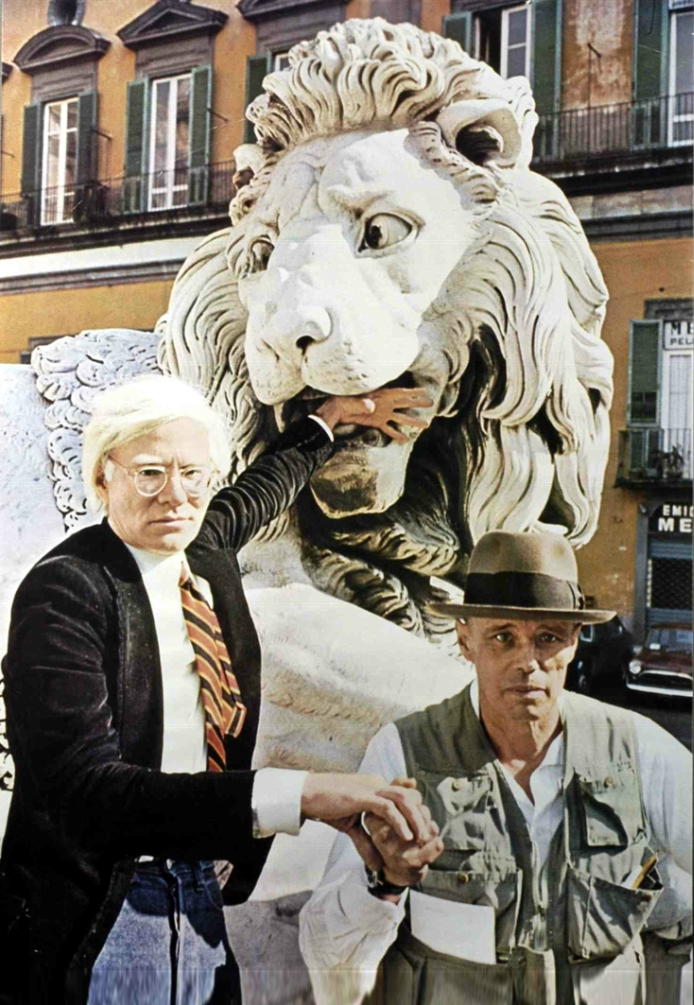
Warhol and Joseph Beuys at the Piazza dei Martiri in Naples, 1980

In March 1980, Warhol released his memoir POPism: The Warhol '60s, a retrospective account of his 1960s career and the cultural environment of the Factory. That year, his series Ten Portraits of Jews of the Twentieth Century drew a wide range of responses, some of them strongly critical. Warhol also co-founded the New York Academy of Art in 1980, an institution dedicated to restoring traditional approaches to artistic training. Fellow co-founder Stuart Pivar later observed that "Modernism got boring [for Warhol] … But his overall game plan, what he really believed, was that the modern age was going away and that we were entering a neoclassical period."

During this period, Warhol developed his Myths series (1981), reimagining cultural icons such as Mickey Mouse, Superman, and Uncle Sam. His longstanding fascination with celebrity and Hollywood glamour also persisted; he once remarked, "I love Los Angeles. I love Hollywood. They're so beautiful. Everything's plastic, but I love plastic. I want to be plastic." Following the end of his relationship with Jed Johnson, his only sustained romantic partnership, Warhol experienced a period of depression and significant weight loss. He shifted his attention to modeling, signing with the Zoli Agency in 1981, and was later represented by Ford Models.

In 1981, Warhol collaborated with Peter Sellars and Lewis Allen on a project titled A No Man Show, a traveling stage production featuring a life-sized animatronic robot modeled after Warhol. Known as the Andy Warhol Robot, the figure was designed to read from Warhol's diaries as part of the performance, reflecting his long-standing interest in mechanization and authorship.

In 1982, Warhol created a limited edition of 100 silkscreen portraits of actress Jane Fonda to support the California State Assembly campaign of her husband, Tom Hayden. Donated to the campaign, the signed prints were sold for $2,000 each.

In 1983, Warhol was commissioned to design a poster commemorating the centennial of the Brooklyn Bridge, which he contributed to the New York Art Expo that year. He also produced a series of Endangered Species (1983) screenprints for Warhol's Animals: Species at Risk, an exhibition held in April 1983 at the American Museum of Natural History in New York City. Ahead of the 1984 Sarajevo Winter Olympics, Warhol participated in the poster campaign by contributing the lithograph Speed Skater (1983).

=== Later collaborations and last exhibitions (1984–1987) ===
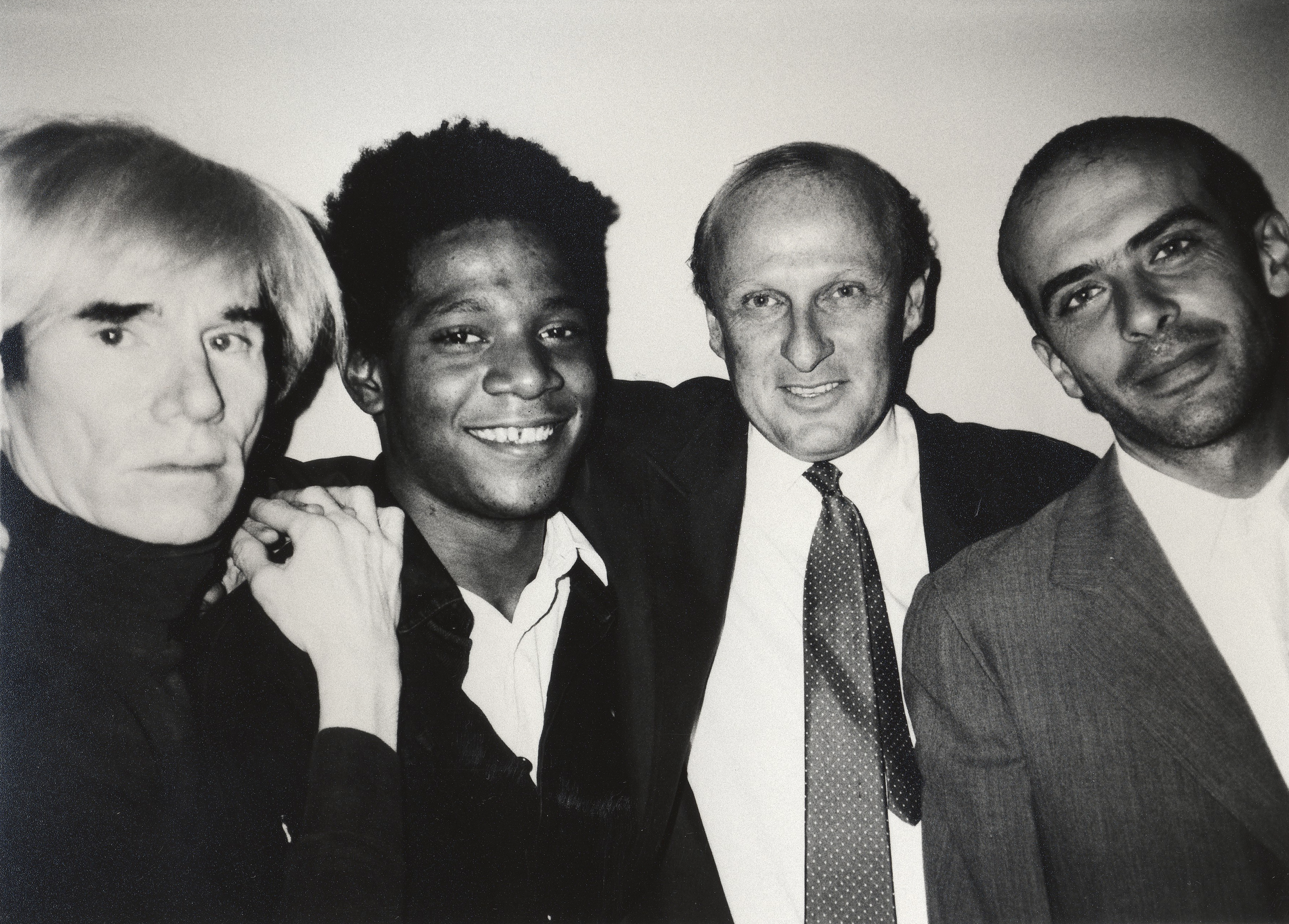
Warhol with Jean-Michel Basquiat, Bruno Bischofberger, and Francesco Clemente, 1984

By 1984, Warhol had affiliated himself with a number of prolific younger artists, who were dominating the "bull market" of 1980s New York art: Neo-Expressionists Julian Schnabel, David Salle, and Eric Fischl, as well as members of the Transavantgarde movement in Europe, including Francesco Clemente, Sandro Chia, and Enzo Cucchi. He also supported artists in the downtown art scene such as Jean-Michel Basquiat, Keith Haring, Kenny Scharf, and Stefano Castronovo. In September 1985, Warhol's joint exhibition with Basquiat, Paintings, opened at the Tony Shafrazi Gallery. That same month, Warhol's silkscreen series Reigning Queens (1985) was exhibited at the Leo Castelli Gallery. Later that year, he collaborated with Haring to design the poster for the 1986 Montreux Jazz Festival in Switzerland, which was also used for the 1986 Montreux-Detroit Jazz Festival in Detroit.

In April 1986, his series Statues of Liberty (1986) debuted at the Galerie Lavignes-Bastille in Paris in conjunction with the centennial of the Statue of Liberty. One of the paintings was featured on the May 12, 1986 cover New York magazine. That same year, he completed the series Self-Portraits (1986), which premiered at London's Anthony d'Offay Gallery in July 1986, and Cars (1986), a series of paintings for Mercedes-Benz.

In January 1987, Warhol traveled to Milan for the opening of his exhibition for his series Last Supper (1986) at the Palazzo delle Stelline. The next month, Warhol modeled with jazz musician Miles Davis for Koshin Satoh's fashion show at the Tunnel in New York City on February 17, 1987.

== Death ==
Warhol was initially diagnosed with a gallstone in 1973, but adamantly rejected surgery because he feared hospitals. When he was insistent about avoiding surgery, his physician Denton Cox attempted to obtain an experimental medication from Japan. The artist also sought guidance from a chiropractor and nutritionist, who suggested that he wear a small crystal. Dehydrated and unable to eat, Warhol was in excruciating pain by February 1987.

Warhol was admitted to New York Hospital in Manhattan on February 20, and he underwent gallbladder surgery on February 21. His surgeon Bjorn Thorbjarnarson found his gallbladder "on the verge of perforating" and in danger of "spilling the infection into (Warhol's) belly." Warhol was awake and able to walk about, make phone calls, and watch television when both of his doctors visited him after the four-hour operation. His private nurse, Min Cho, saw his growing pallor at 4:30 the following morning, but she did not call the hospital's cardiac-arrest team until 5:45 am, when he was "unresponsive" and turning blue. He was pronounced dead at 6:31 a.m. from sudden cardiac arrhythmia.

=== Funeral and memorial service ===
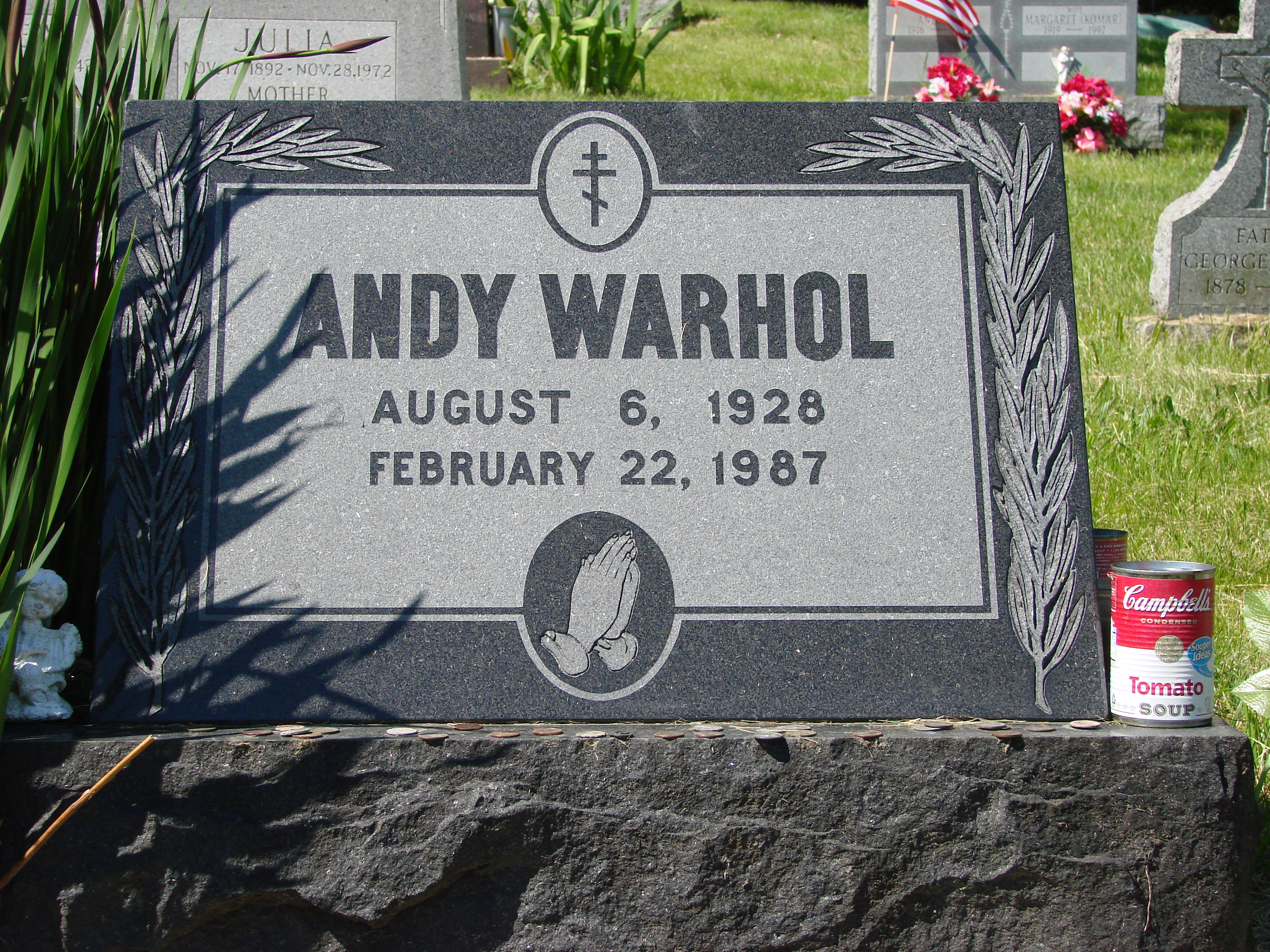
Warhol's grave at the St. John the Baptist Byzantine Catholic Cemetery in Bethel Park, Pennsylvania

Warhol's brothers took his body back to Pittsburgh, where an open-casket wake was held at the Thomas P. Kunsak Funeral Home. The solid bronze casket had gold-plated rails and white upholstery. Warhol was dressed in a black cashmere suit, a paisley tie, and a platinum wig. He was laid out holding a small prayer book and a red rose. A half-hour funeral liturgy in English and Church Slavonic was led by Monsignor Peter Tay at the Holy Ghost Byzantine Catholic Church on Pittsburgh's North Side on February 26, 1987. After the liturgy, the casket, covered with white roses and asparagus ferns, was driven to St. John the Baptist Byzantine Catholic Cemetery in Bethel Park, a south suburb of Pittsburgh, where Warhol was buried near his parents. The priest said a brief prayer at the graveside and sprinkled holy water on the casket. Before the casket was lowered, Warhol's close friend Paige Powell tossed copies of the February and March issues of Interview magazine along with a bottle of Estée Lauder's Beautiful Eau de Parfum into his grave.

A memorial service for Warhol was held at St. Patrick's Cathedral in Manhattan on April 1, 1987. It was attended by over 2,000 people, including Warhol collaborators and numerous celebrities such as Raquel Welch, Debbie Harry, Liza Minnelli, Claus von Bülow, and Calvin Klein, among others. Eulogies were given by his friends John Richardson and Yoko Ono. Afterwards, there was a luncheon at the Diamond Horseshoe nightclub beneath the Paramount Hotel.

=== Wrongful death lawsuit ===
In April 1987, the New York State Health Department released a report that Warhol was given inadequate care by New York Hospital from the time he was admitted until the hours before his death. These included not performing the appropriate work-up tests prior to surgery, giving Warhol antibiotics to which he may have experienced an allergic response, causing him to become overhydrated, and repeatedly failing to take accurate notes on his chart. There were no issues with the procedure itself, according to the report. In response, the hospital dismissed the private nurse who had been employed to care for Warhol and penalized the staff nurse who had been tasked with overseeing her. However, the hospital claimed that the nursing deficiencies were not significant enough to cause Warhol's death.

In December 1991, Warhol's family sued the hospital in the New York Supreme Court for inadequate care, before judge Ira Gammerman, saying that the arrhythmia was caused by improper care and water intoxication. The malpractice case was quickly settled out of court; Warhol's family received an undisclosed sum of money.

Prior to his surgery, doctors expected Warhol to survive, though a re-evaluation of the case about thirty years after his death showed many indications that Warhol's surgery was in fact riskier than originally thought. It was widely reported at the time that Warhol had died of a "routine" surgery, though when considering factors such as his age, a family history of gallbladder problems, his previous gunshot wound, and his medical state in the weeks leading up to the procedure, the potential risk of death following the surgery appeared to have been significant.

== Artworks ==
=== Drawings ===
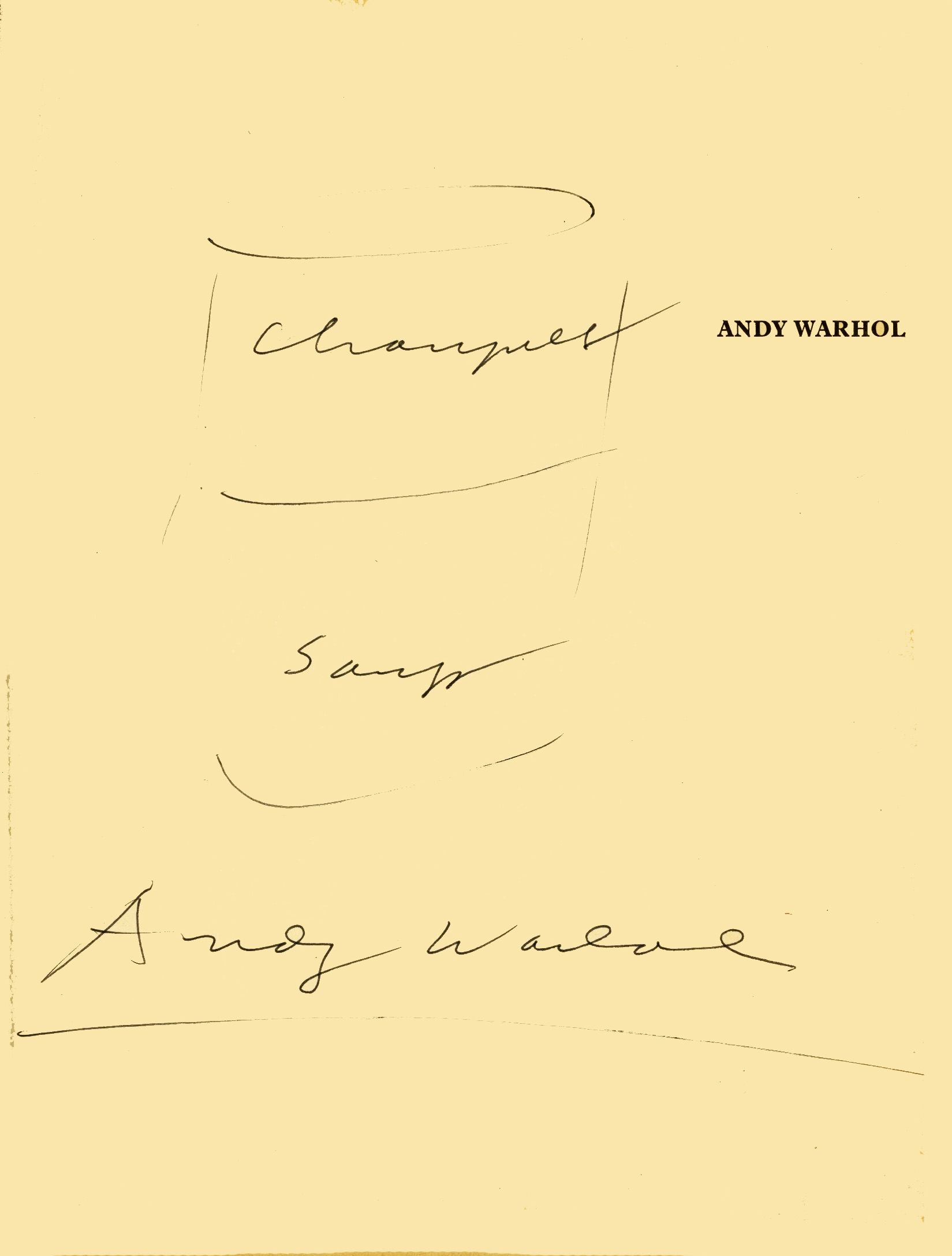
Warhol drawing and signature

Although Warhol is best known for his work in printmaking, particularly silkscreen, he was also a highly skilled illustrator and draughtsman. His early drawings on paper convey a sense of ease and immediacy, shaped by the "blotted line" technique he pioneered as a student at Carnegie Tech. Warhol achieved the blotted-line effect through a simple but deliberate process. He taped a penciled drawing to a sheet of smooth Strathmore board, traced sections of the image in ink, and while the ink was still wet, pressed the sheets together to transfer the design. Because the ink dried quickly, he worked in stages—lifting and re-inking the drawing until the entire image was transferred—producing irregular, variable lines in a process akin to rudimentary printmaking. He embraced the accidental blots and breaks created by this method, never making corrections, and often applied pastel washes of Dr. Ph. Martin's dyes slightly off register. He sometimes used photographs to trace for his drawings.

Warhol's illustration style was immediately recognizable for its casual sophistication, described as a "lighthearted naïve Ben Shahn." Among his best-known early illustrations were his shoe drawings for I. Miller. Some of his drawings were later published by Bulfinch Press in themed collections, including Cats, Cats, Cats, Yum, Yum, Yum, and Shoes, Shoes, Shoes. He also produced title-card illustrations for television programs and weather drawings for CBS.

Throughout his career, Warhol continued to draw subjects that he also explored in his paintings. His later drawings demonstrate the technical skill and draftsmanship he developed over the course of his career.

=== Paintings and prints ===
In the early 1960s, the Pop art movement was an experimental form that several artists were independently adopting. Warhol, who would be dubbed the "Pope of Pop Art" and "King of Pop," turned to this new style, where popular subjects could be part of the artist's palette. He experimented with his artistic style and painting techniques before he became synonymous with the movement. His early paintings feature images taken from cartoons and advertisements, hand-painted with paint drips. Those drips emulated the style of Abstract expressionists such as Willem de Kooning. His first Pop art paintings were displayed in April 1961, serving as the backdrop for the New York Department Store Bonwit Teller's window display.

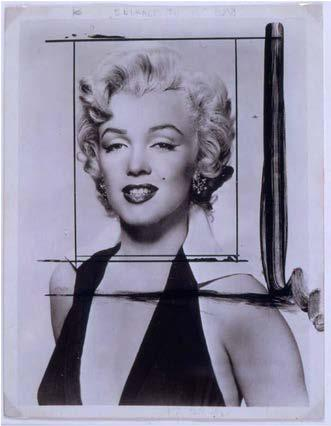
Publicity photo of Marilyn Monroe for Niagara (1953), with reframing lines by Warhol. This was used as the basis for Warhol's portraits of Monroe.

In 1962, Warhol adopted the silkscreen print process as a technique for making paintings to make a more "assembly-line effect." For this process, a photograph was enlarged and transferred in glue onto a silk mesh. Ink was then rolled across the screen with a squeegee, passing through the unsealed areas of the mesh, thereby transferring the image onto the canvas. Warhol had several assistants throughout his career, including Gerard Malanga, Ronnie Cutrone, Jay Shriver, and Benjamin Liu who helped him produced his silkscreen, following his directions to make different variations.

For his first major exhibition in 1962, Warhol painted his celebrated cans of Campbell's soup, which he claimed to have had for lunch for 20 years. Warhol began to make paintings of everyday objects such as Coca-Cola bottles, dollar bills, trading stamps, and more gruesome subjects such as images of suicide, electric chairs, and car crashes, as in the Death and Disaster (1962–67) series. He also painted portraits of icons such as Warren Beatty, Marilyn Monroe, Elizabeth Taylor, and Jackie Kennedy. His work became popular and controversial. Warhol articulated an egalitarian view of consumer goods, noting that products such as Coca-Cola were shared across social classes: "You can know that the President drinks Coke, Liz Taylor drinks Coke, and just think, you can drink Coke too."

Campbell's Soup I (1968)

Throughout the 1960s, Warhol repeatedly returned to Marilyn Monroe as a subject, creating works such as Gold Marilyn Monroe (1962), serial images including Marilyn Diptych (1962), the Flavor Marilyns (1962)—named for their color and Life Savers candy flavors. In 1964, four of his new larger Marilyn canvases were famously shot by performance artist Dorothy Podber, resulting in the Shot Marilyns.

In 1967, Warhol established Factory Additions as his printmaking and publishing enterprise, issuing portfolios of ten images in editions of 250. In 1970, some of the acetate films used to produce some of Warhol's screenprints were taken to Europe, where they were used to create a new series of editions published under the name "Sunday B. Morning." Produced in Belgium using the same color references as the original Factory prints, the editions included versions of Warhol's Marilyn Monroe, Flowers, Campbell's Soup I, Campbell's Soup II, and Dollar Bill images. Although Warhol initially signed and numbered one edition of 250, he later distanced himself from the project after disputes with collaborators, and some prints were stamped "Fill in Your Own Signature" or inscribed by Warhol with the phrase "This is not by me, Andy Warhol." Early versions bore black stamps on the verso, shifting to blue ink later on.

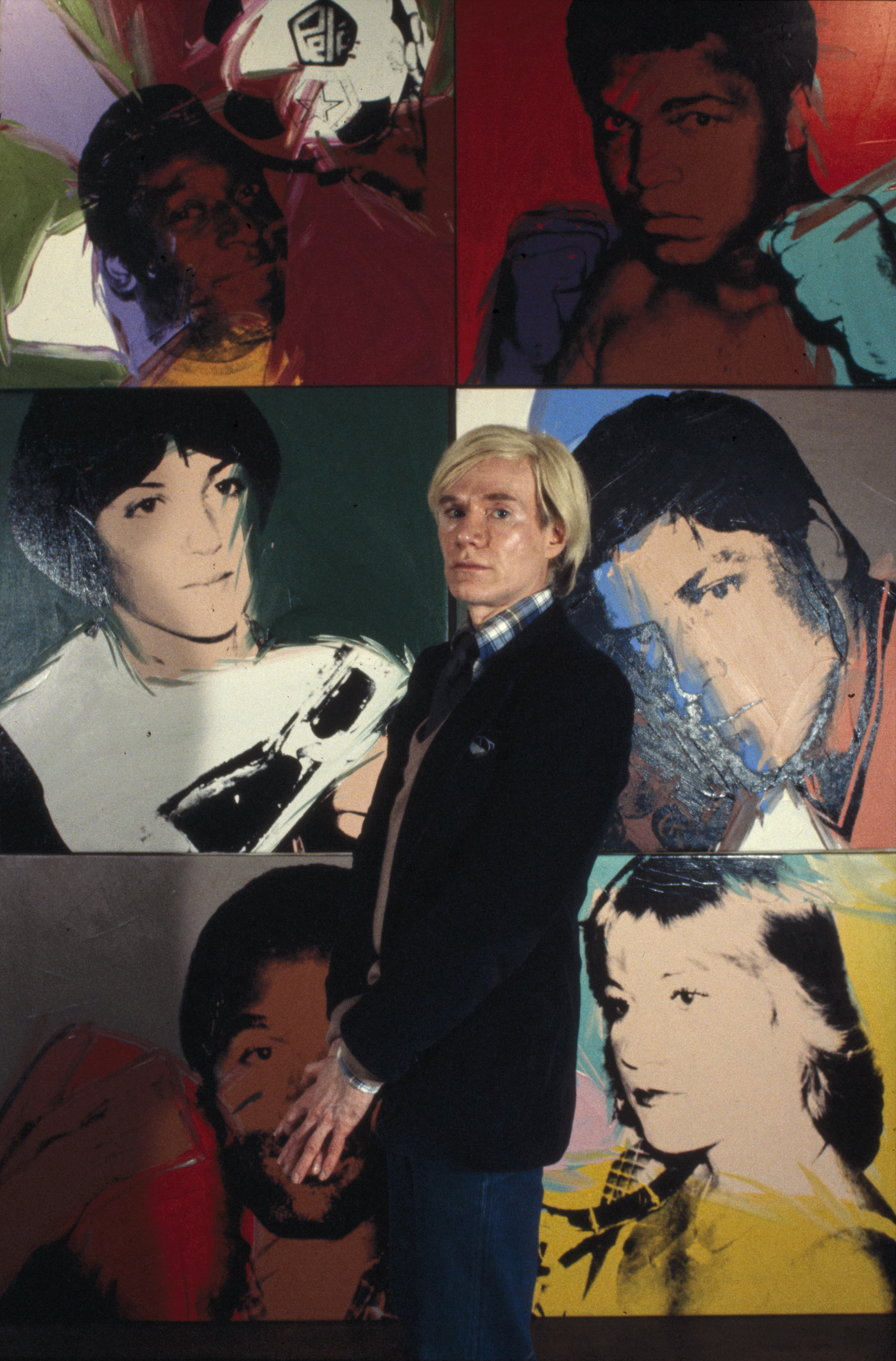
Warhol with portraits from his Athletes series, 1977

In the 1970s, Warhol evolved into a portraiture artist, painting commissioned portraits of celebrities and socialites. The last portrait he made at the old Factory at 33 Union Square West, in 1974, was of his mother, Julia Warhola, who had died two years earlier. In the new Factory at 860 Broadway, he left behind the finger-painting and gestural complexity of his 1972–74 works for a cleaner, more streamlined style—echoing the shift from the old studio's clutter to the new one's openness. Many of the portraits Warhol produced between 1975 and 1976, share a soft, pastel look, with distant eyes under washes of azure, mint, or lavender. This style defined his portrayals of Mick Jagger, Joe MacDonald, Roy Lichtenstein, Marilyn Karp, Marcia Weisman, and Tina Freeman.

Warhol wasn't only painting commissioned portraits—though some non-portrait works were still dealer-commissioned before he began them. His studio production returned to mid-sixties levels, with the same intensity and volume. After the Mao series (1972–73), he created Hand Colored Flowers (1974), a portfolio of 10 flower prints, silkscreened in black and hand watercolored. In 1975, Warhol completed the Ladies and Gentlemen series, followed by Cats and Dogs in 1976 and the Skulls series later that year. He subsequently began working on Hammer and Sickle (1976–77). In 1977, he debuted his Torsos and Athletes series, and then began Oxidation (1977–78) also known as "piss paintings," which were abstract works that Warhol created by exposing a layer of metallic paint to urine, and Shadows (1978–79).

In 1979, Warhol was commissioned to paint a BMW M1 Group 4 racing version for the fourth installment of the BMW Art Car project. He was initially asked to paint a BMW 320i in 1978, but the car model was changed, and it didn't qualify for the race that year. Warhol was the first artist to paint directly onto the automobile himself instead of letting technicians transfer a scale-model design to the car. Reportedly, it took him only 23 minutes to paint the entire car. Racecar drivers Hervé Poulain, Manfred Winkelhock and Marcel Mignot drove the car at the 1979 24 Hours of Le Mans.

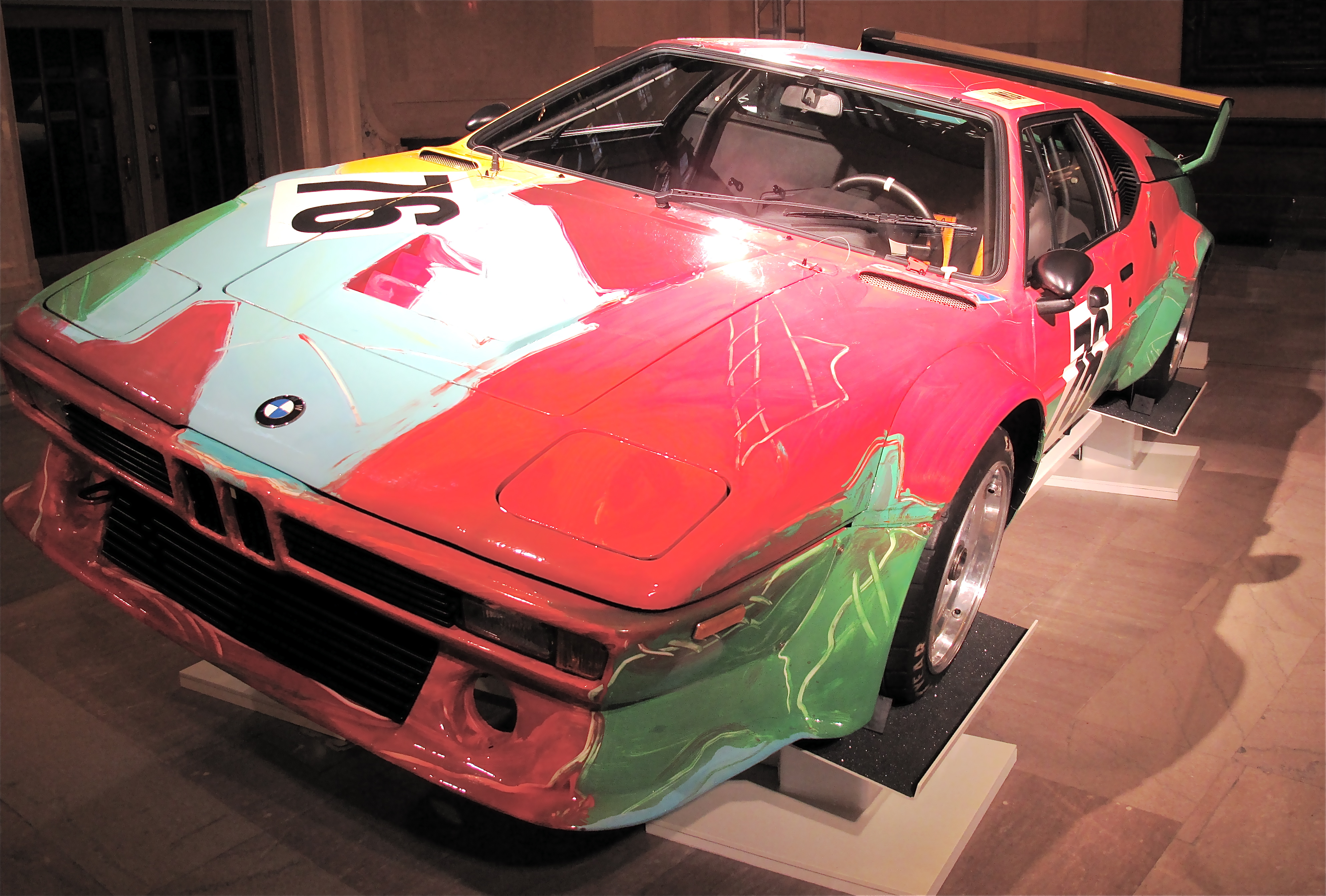
BMW Group - 4 M1 (1979), painted by Warhol

In 1979, Warhol began his Reversals and Retrospectives series, revisiting earlier subjects such as Marilyn Monroe, Mao Zedong, and his disaster imagery. During the 1980s, art dealer Ronald Feldman often handled the legal and licensing issues surrounding Warhol's print and painting projects, working closely with Warhol and his business manager Fred Hughes. Feldman commissioned several portfolios, including Ten Portraits of Jews of the Twentieth Century (1980), Myths (1981), and Endangered Species (1983).

In 1983, Warhol began collaborating with artists Jean-Michel Basquiat and Francesco Clemente. Warhol and Basquiat created a series of more than 50 large collaborative works between 1984 and 1985. In their collaborations, Warhol would silkscreen or paint words, symbols, newspaper headlines, or enlarged corporate logos—such as Paramount Pictures or General Electric—onto the canvas, which Basquiat would then rework with his own expressionistic figures, text, and imagery, adding to and subtracting from Warhol's compositions.

In a 1985 interview with art historian Benjamin H. D. Buchloh, Warhol named French painter Bernard Buffet as his "favorite artist" and "the last big artist in Paris." Art historians and critics have extensively compared the two artists' practices, noting that Buffet prefigured Warhol's Pop methods through his comic-strip ligne claire contours, mass-market merchandise, and seamless integration of high and low culture.

Late in his career, camouflage became a recurring motif in Warhol's work. The paradox of using a pattern designed to conceal its subject appears to have appealed to him as he incorporated it into several series in 1986, including Statues of Liberty, Self-Portraits, and Last Supper, based on Leonardo da Vinci's The Last Supper. At the time of his death, Warhol was working on several print portfolios, including Beethoven (1987), for a series on composers, and Moonwalk (1987), from a proposed history of television series.

=== Digital art ===
In 1985, Warhol experimented with digital art using a Commodore Amiga 1000 personal computer. On July 23, 1985, during the launch event at Lincoln Center in New York City, he used Amiga's graphics program ProPaint to create a digitally painted portrait of Blondie singer Debbie Harry. He subsequently used Amiga computers to create the short film You Are the One, which incorporated twenty digitized images of Marilyn Monroe from 1950s newsreel footage that he manipulated using an Amiga Set to music, the film was not shown during Warhol's lifetime and was discovered in 2001 among his computer disks, along with a separate disk containing the soundtrack. Following legal disputes over the work, You Are the One was publicly screened for the first time in 2006 at the Museum of New Art in Detroit.

Warhol also created other digital works using the Amiga, including a manipulation of his 1985 Dolly Parton portrait, and a self-portrait, which became the cover for "The Creative Issue" of Amiga World (January/February 1986). In June 2013, Christie's presented Viral: Andy Warhol and the Image before the Internet Age, a pop-up exhibition at the Computer History Museum organized in partnership with the Andy Warhol Foundation. In 2021, the foundation sold five of Warhol's computer drawings as NFTs.

=== Sculptures ===
Campbell's Tomato Juice Box (1964)

Warhol's most well-known sculptures are his Brillo Boxes—silkscreen ink on wood replicas of the large branded cardboard boxes used to hold 24 packages of Brillo soap pads. The original Brillo design was by commercial artist James Harvey. Warhol's Brillo Boxes were part of a series of "grocery carton" works that also included Heinz ketchup and Campbell's tomato juice boxes. Other famous works include the Silver Clouds—helium filled, silver mylar, pillow-shaped balloons. A Silver Cloud was included in the traveling exhibition Air Art (1968–1969) curated by Willoughby Sharp. Clouds was also adapted by Warhol for avant-garde choreographer Merce Cunningham's dance piece RainForest (1968).

Warhol's Invisible Sculpture made in 1980 consisted of burglar alarms placed around the perimeter of a room at the Factory and aimed toward an empty center. When a visitor stepped into the center point, all the alarms were triggered simultaneously. A version of Invisible Sculpture without the burglar alarms was installed at New York's Area nightclub in 1984 as part of its "Art" theme.

=== Art market ===
During Warhol's lifetime, his work was initially modestly priced. In 1965, large paintings from the Flowers series sold for approximately $6,000, while smaller versions were available for as little as $400. By the 1970s, Warhol had established a lucrative portrait practice, charging $25,000 for a commissioned portrait, with a discounted rate of $40,000 for two portraits.

Warhol's market began to gain momentum at auction during his lifetime. In 1970, Campbell's Soup Can with Peeling Label (1962) sold for $60,000 at Parke-Bernet Galleries, then the highest price ever paid at public auction for a work by a living American artist. In 1978, 19 Cents (1962) sold for $95,000—setting a new auction record for Warhol—after having originally been purchased for $1,300 in 1962.

Following Warhol's death in 1987, the value of his work continued to rise significantly, establishing him as one of the most consistently high-performing artists in the global art market. In 2014 alone, Warhol's works generated approximately $569 million at auction, accounting for more than one-sixth of the global art market that year. Despite occasional downturns, his market has demonstrated long-term resilience. Art dealer Dominique Lévy characterized Warhol's market as "a seesaw being pulled uphill," noting that while prices fluctuate, each successive peak and decline occurs at a higher level than the previous one. She attributed this pattern to the continual influx of new collectors, observing that different generations and demographics periodically enter the market, driving renewed demand before stabilizing and giving way to the next cycle of interest.

Warhol's celebrity imagery commands high prices, and Marilyn Monroe remains one of his most iconic subjects. In 1998, industrialist S.I. Newhouse Jr. purchased Orange Marilyn (1964) at Sotheby's for $17.3 million, setting a new record at the time for the highest price paid for a Warhol work. After Newhouse's death in 2017, hedge fund manager Kenneth C. Griffin reportedly purchased Orange Marilyn in a private sale for approximately $200 million.

Warhol's market continued to strengthen in the 2000s. In 2007, collectors Stefan Edlis and Gael Neeson sold Turquoise Marilyn (1964) to financier Steven A. Cohen in a private transaction reportedly valued at $80 million. In May 2007, Green Car Crash (Green Burning Car I) (1963) realized $71.1 million at Christie's, while Lemon Marilyn (1962) sold for $28 million in the same auction. In November 2009, 200 One Dollar Bills (1962) sold for $43.8 million at Sotheby's.

The Elvis series remains among Warhol's most important bodies of work; of the 22 versions produced, eleven are held in museum collections. Eight Elvises (1963), depicting Elvis Presley in a gunslinger pose, was sold privately in 2008 by Annibale Berlingieri for approximately $100 million. Related works have also achieved strong results at auction, including Double Elvis (Ferus Type), which sold for $37 million at Sotheby's in 2012, and Triple Elvis (Ferus Type), which sold for $81.9 million at Christie's in 2014.

Portraits of Elizabeth Taylor have also been highly sought after. In 2007, Liz (Colored Liz) (1963), formerly owned by actor Hugh Grant, sold for $23.7 million at Christie's. In November 2010, Men in Her Life (1962) sold for $63.4 million at Phillips de Pury, while Coca-Cola (4) (1962) sold for $35.3 million at Sotheby's. In May 2011, Liz No. 5 (Early Colored Liz) sold for $26.9 million at Phillips. In May 2015, Silver Liz (1963, diptych) sold for $28 million, while Colored Mona Lisa (1963) achieved $56.2 million at Christie's.

Warhol's self-portraits have likewise performed strongly at auction. In May 2010, a purple Self-Portrait 1986) sold for $32.6 million at Sotheby's. In May 2011, Warhol's earliest Self-Portrait (1963–64) sold for $38.4 million at Christie's, while a red Self-Portrait (1986) sold for $27.5 million at the same auction house.

Several major sales in the 2010s further cemented Warhol's status as one of the most valuable artists in the world. In 2010, his work sold for a total of $313 million, accounting for 17% of all contemporary auction sales. In November 2013, Warhol's rarely exhibited diptych Silver Car Crash (Double Disaster) (1963) sold for $105.4 million at Sotheby's, setting a new auction record for the artist at the time. That same month, Coca-Cola (3) (1962) sold for $57.3 million at Christie's. In May 2014, Race Riot (1963), sold for $62.9 million and White Marilyn (1962), sold for $41 million at Christie's. Warhol's portrait of Marlon Brando, Four Marlons (1966), realized $69.6 million at Christie's in November 2014. In July 2015, Warhol's hand-painted canvas One Dollar Bill (Silver Certificate) (1962) fetched $32.8 million at Sotheby's.

Warhol's market continued to expand globally into the 2020s. In March 2022, Silver Liz (Ferus Type) sold for ¥2.3 billion ($18.9 million) at Shinwa Auction, setting a new auction record in Japan. In May 2022, Shot Sage Blue Marilyn (1964) sold for $195 million at Christie's, becoming the most expensive American artwork ever sold at auction.

=== Collectors ===
Burton Tremaine and Emily Hall Tremaine were among Warhol's earliest collectors and most influential supporters. In 1962, they acquired 15 works from, including Do It Yourself (Violin), Marilyn Diptych (1962), now in the collection of Tate Modern in London, and A Boy for Meg (1962), now held by the National Gallery of Art in Washington, DC. In recognition of their support and encouragement, Warhol gave the Tremaines Head of Marilyn Monroe as a Christmas gift, leaving the work by their door.

Robert Scull and Ethel Scull were also early and significant patrons of Warhol's work. Ethel Scull became the subject of Warhol's first commissioned portrait, Ethel Scull 36 Times (1963), which is now part of the Metropolitan Museum of Art's collection.

== Business art ==
Warhol was an advocate of "Business Art", as he stated in his book The Philosophy of Andy Warhol: From A to B and Back Again: "I went into business art. I wanted to be an art business man or a business artist. Being good in business is the most fascinating kind of art," he said. His transformation into a mere business artist was a point of criticism. In hindsight, however, some critics have come to view Warhol's superficiality and commerciality as "the most brilliant mirror of our times", contending that "Warhol had captured something irresistible about the zeitgeist of American culture in the 1970s."

In addition to his paintings and drawings, Warhol directed and produced films, managed the Velvet Underground, and authored numerous books, as well as producing works in such diverse media as audio, photography, sculpture, theater, fashion, and performance art. His ability to blur the lines between art, commerce, and everyday life was central to his creative philosophy. "That's probably the greatest thing about Warhol: the way he penetrated and summarized our world, to the point that distinguishing between him and our everyday life is basically impossible, and in any case useless," said artist Maurizio Cattelan.

=== Films and Warhol superstars ===
Film still from Empire (1965)

Between 1963 and 1968, Warhol produced more than 600 underground films, including short black-and-white Screen Tests, which offered silent, close-up portraits of Factory visitors. Many of these works premiered at the New Andy Warhol Garrick Theatre in Greenwich Village and the 55th Street Playhouse in Midtown Manhattan.

Warhol's "superstars" were a retinue of bohemian and counterculture eccentrics who appeared in Warhol's films in the mid-1960s to early 1970s, including Baby Jane Holzer, Brigid Berlin, Ondine, Edie Sedgwick, Ingrid Superstar, Nico, International Velvet, Viva, Ultra Violet, Joe Dallesandro, Candy Darling, Holly Woodlawn, Jackie Curtis, and Jane Forth.

Warhol's early experimental films were minimalist studies of duration and everyday life. Sleep (1964) documents poet John Giorno sleeping for over five hours; Kiss (1964) presents a series of couples kissing; Eat (1964) shows Robert Indiana consuming a mushroom in real time; and Blow Job (1964) consists of a single, unbroken shot of DeVeren Bookwalter's face during an implied sexual act. For these efforts, Jonas Mekas awarded Warhol the Independent Film Award in 1964, calling attention to his growing influence in avant-garde cinema. Newsday's Mike McGrady hailed Warhol as "the Cecil B. DeMille of the Off-Hollywood movie makers." The Village Voice called him one of the "most exciting" filmmakers in New York.

Warhol superstars Joe Dallesandro and Louis Waldon in Flesh (1968)

In 1964, Warhol also created Batman Dracula, an unauthorized homage to the comic-book hero, screened only at his exhibitions. The film was never finished, but it is considered the first depiction of a blatantly campy Batman film. The following year, he released Empire (1965), an eight-hour static shot of the Empire State Building, and Vinyl (1965), a loose adaptation of the dystopian novel A Clockwork Orange by Anthony Burgess. Warhol's films didn't have a script; he encouraged the actors to improvise their dialogue. His most celebrated film of the period, Chelsea Girls (1966), innovatively used dual 16mm projections running simultaneously with alternating sound, becoming the first underground film of the decade to achieve widespread critical attention. Warhol's final film as director, Blue Movie (1969), starring Viva and Louis Waldon, was controversial for its explicit content and is regarded as a landmark film in the Golden Age of Porn.

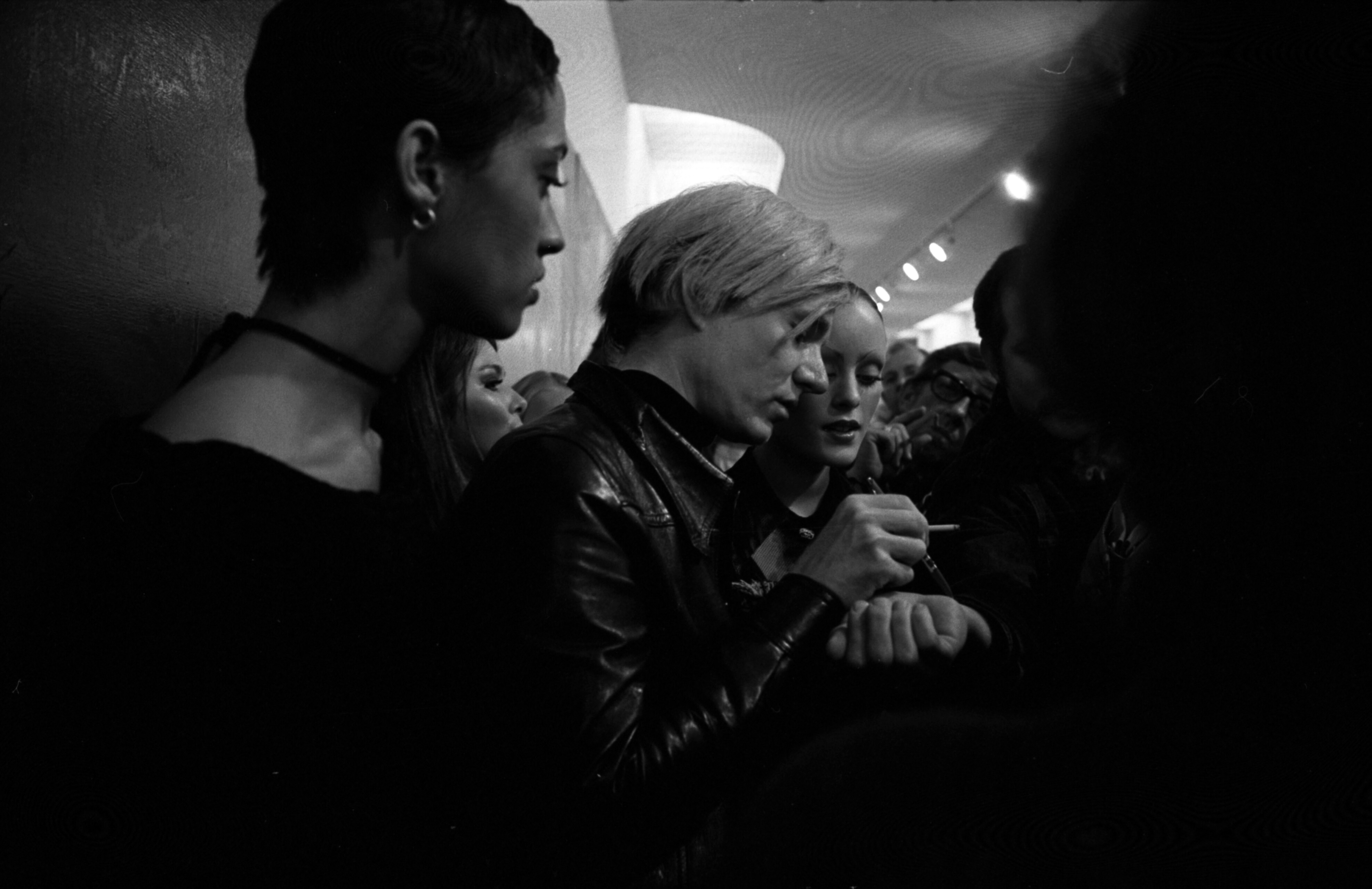
Warhol with his superstars Carol LaBrie and Jane Forth at the Pasadena Art Museum, 1970

After Warhol survived a near-fatal shooting in 1968, filmmaking responsibilities increasingly shifted to his collaborator Paul Morrissey. Morrissey steered the Warhol-branded cinema towards more mainstream, narrative-based, B-movie exploitation fare with Flesh (1968), Trash (1970) and Heat (1972), Andy Warhol's Dracula (1973), and Andy Warhol's Frankenstein (1974), starring Joe Dallesandro. The last Warhol-produced film, Bad, starring Carroll Baker was directed by Warhol's boyfriend Jed Johnson, who had assisted Morrissey on several films. After Warhol lost money on the film, he abandoned filmmaking until 1986 when he acquired the rights to Tama Janowitz's bestselling novel Slaves of New York, intending to produce the film adaptation.

Most of Warhol's films were withdrawn from circulation by Warhol and his associates who managed his business affairs. In 1984, with Warhol's cooperation, the Whitney Museum of American Art and the Museum of Modern Art began restoration efforts, and the films have since been screened periodically at museums and film festivals. In 2022, the Andy Warhol Museum launched The Warhol TV, a streaming platform offering free museum content as well as rentals of select films from its collection.

=== Television and theater ===
Academic Lynn Spigel wrote that Warhol "epitomizes the mergers of art and commerce during the three-network era." She argued that his television experiments, from the 1960s through his cable shows of the 1980s, "provided a space for queer visibility and an alternate view of everyday life from the one network TV typically offered."

In 1968, Warhol produced a television commercial for Schrafft's restaurants in New York City promoting an ice cream dessert called the "Underground Sundae." In 1969, Warhol said, "Television is so great. Everybody ought to have at least two sets, or three, like the President. There's always something interesting to see. Television is like the movies I make. It's just a lot of pictures of cigarets, cops, cowboys, kids, war, all cutting in and out of each other without stopping. If you watch it right straight through, it's just one whole big thing." Warhol envisioned a television special devoted to one of his favorite subjects, Nothing, which he planned to call Nothing Special. Later in his career, he produced three television programs: Fashion (1979–80), Andy Warhol's TV (1980–83), and the MTV talk show Andy Warhol's Fifteen Minutes (1985–87). In 1985, Warhol fictionalized version of himself in the television series The Love Boat.

Warhol also ventured into theater. His play Andy Warhol's Pork, premiered at New York's La MaMa Theater in May 1971 and ran for two weeks. It was brought to the Roundhouse in London for a longer run in August 1971. Pork was based on tape-recorded conversations between Brigid Berlin and Warhol. Berlin would play Warhol tapes she had made of phone conversations between herself and her mother, socialite Honey Berlin. In 1974, Warhol designed the sets for the musical Man on the Moon.

=== Advertisements ===
Warhol enthusiastically embraced advertising, viewing it as extensions of his artistic engagement with mass media and consumer culture. In 1969, he appeared in two commercials for Braniff International Airways' "When You Got It – Flaunt It" campaign, including one alongside heavyweight boxer Sonny Liston. Warhol's first regular endorsement contract followed in 1973, when he signed a deal with Pioneer Electronics. The first campaign featured Warhol alongside his dachshund Archie, posed among stereo speakers, turntables, and tape recorders under the headline "Andy Warhol's Unfinished Symphony."

In 1982, he appeared in a Sony Beta tapes commercial, posed beside a Marilyn portrait to emphasize the tape's ability to reproduce "brilliant color and delicate shading." He went on to appear in commercials for TDK videotape in 1983 and Diet Coke in 1985. In 1985, Warhol endorsed Vidal Sassoon hairspray. In 1986, he appeared in a print advertisement for the investment firm Drexel Burnham Lambert.

=== Music and cover art ===
In 1963, Warhol formed The Druds, a short-lived avant-garde noise band that featured members from the New York minimal art and proto-conceptual art scenes, including Larry Poons, La Monte Young, Walter De Maria, Jasper Johns, Claes Oldenburg, and Lucas Samaras.

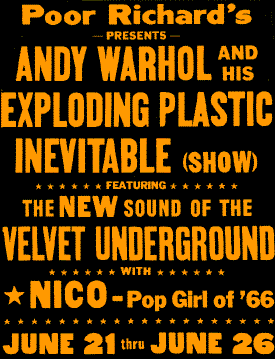
Poster for Warhol's Exploding Plastic Inevitable, 1966

In 1965, Warhol adopted the band the Velvet Underground, making them a crucial element of the Exploding Plastic Inevitable multimedia performance art show. His involvement with the musicians of The Velvet Underground was driven by an expressed desire to become a music producer. Warhol and Paul Morrissey acted as the band's managers, introducing them to Nico, who would perform with the band at Warhol's request.

In 1966, Warhol "produced" their first album The Velvet Underground & Nico, as well as providing its album art. His actual participation in the album's production amounted to simply paying for the studio time. After the band's first album, Warhol and band leader Lou Reed started to disagree more about the direction the band should take, and Warhol was fired in 1967. In 1989, Reed and John Cale reunited for the first time since 1972 to write, perform, record and release the concept album Songs for Drella, as a tribute to Warhol.

Warhol designed many album covers for various artists beginning during his days as an illustrator in the 1950s. The album covers he designed include for I'm Still Swinging (1955) by The Joe Newman Octet, Blue Lights, Vols. 1 & 2 (1958) by Kenny Burrell, This Is John Wallowitch!!! (1964) by John Wallowitch, Sticky Fingers (1971) and Love You Live (1977) by The Rolling Stones, The Academy in Peril (1972) by John Cale, Silk Electric (1982) by Diana Ross, and Aretha (1986) by Aretha Franklin.

In 1984, Warhol co-directed the music video "Hello Again" by the Cars, and he appeared in the video as a bartender. In 1986, Warhol co-directed the music video "Misfit" by Curiosity Killed the Cat and he made a cameo in video. He also had a cameo in Grace Jones music video "I'm Not Perfect (But I'm Perfect for You)" (1986).

=== Books ===
Beginning in the late 1950s, Warhol produced several unbound portfolios of his work. In 1957, his bound book 25 Cats Name Sam and One Blue Pussy was printed by Seymour Berlin. Berlin also printed some of Warhol's other self-published books, including A Gold Book (1957) and Wild Raspberries (1959). Warhol's book A La Recherche du Shoe Perdu marked his "transition from commercial to gallery artist". The title is a play on words by Warhol on the title of French author Marcel Proust's À la recherche du temps perdu. In an effort to generate work, the majority of these books were printed to be given out to people to draw attention to his illustrations.

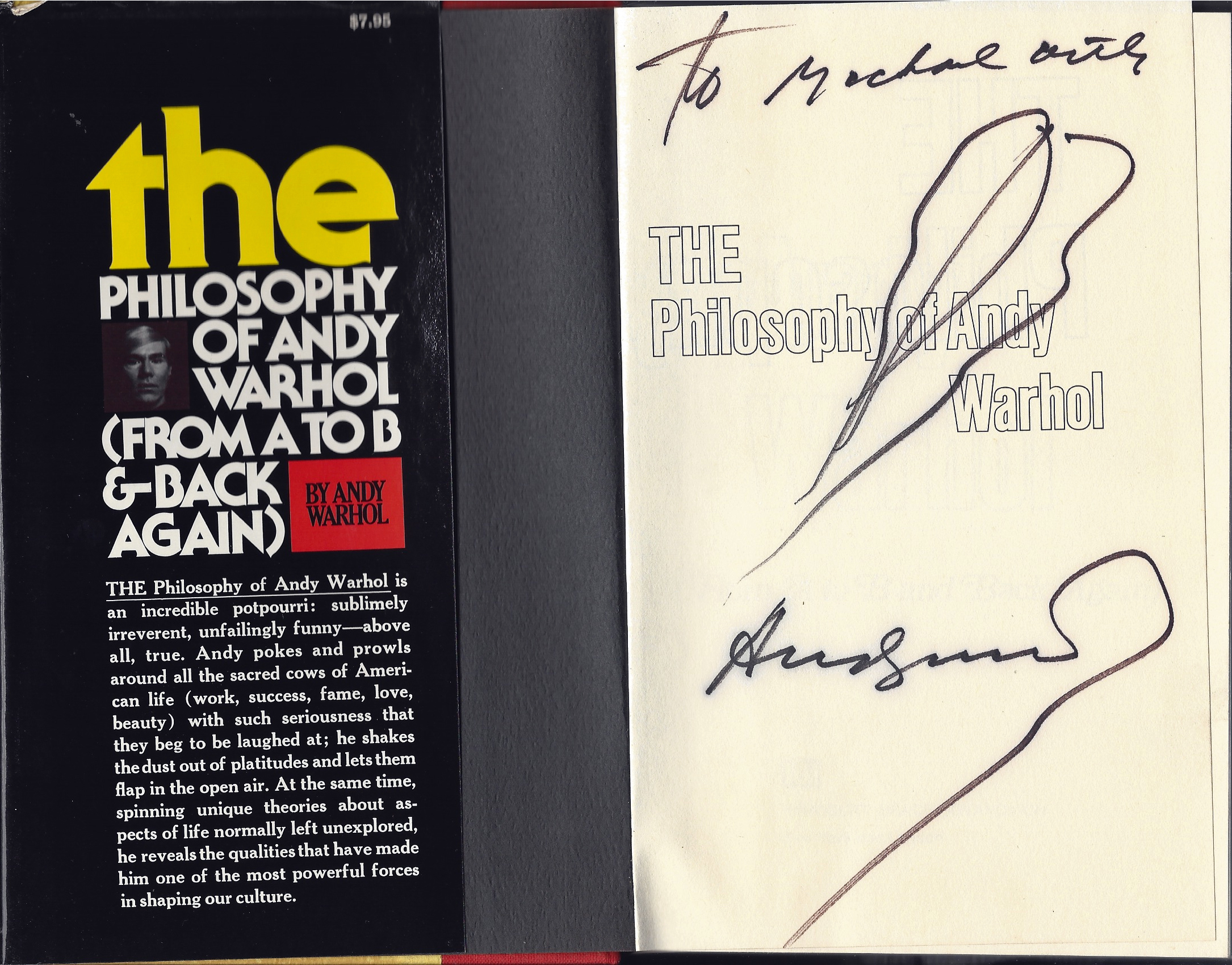
Drawing by Warhol dedicated to Michael Arth in The Philosophy of Andy Warhol (1975)

After gaining fame, Warhol commercially published several books:

- Andy Warhol's Index (Book) (1967) is a portrait of Warhol's Factory scene through photographs, interactive pop-up pages, and audio recordings.
- A, a Novel (1968) is a literal transcription of audio recordings of Ondine and several others in Warhol's circle.
- The Philosophy of Andy Warhol (From A to B & Back Again) (1975, ISBN 978-0-15-671720-5) consists of transcriptions and text by Pat Hackett based on daily phone conversations and audio cassettes.
- Exposures (1979, ISBN 9780448128504) is a book of photographs with anecdotes.
- POPism: The Warhol '60s (1980, ISBN 978-0-15-173095-7) is a retrospective view of the 1960s Factory scene and the rise of Pop art.
- Warhol's America (1985, ISBN 978-0060960049) features photographs gathered over a decade of travels across the United States, paired with anecdotes and reflections.
- Vanishing Animals (1986, ISBN 0-387-96410-X) features illustrations by Warhol and text by Kurt Benirschke about the plight of endangered animals.
- Andy Warhol's Party Book (1988, ISBN 0-517-56698-2) discusses Warhol's partygoing habits and tips for what makes a great party.
- The Andy Warhol Diaries (1989, ISBN 978-0-446-39138-2) is a diary dictated by Warhol to Hackett in daily phone conversations between November 1976 and February 1987, offering an intimate account of his career, social circle, and private life.

=== Magazines ===
In the 1950s, Warhol was frequently commissioned by prominent fashion magazines, including Glamour, Mademoiselle, Vogue, Harper's Bazaar, and Look, producing a prolific body of advertisements throughout the decade. Between 1953 and 1954, he also designed several covers for Interiors magazine.

In 1969, artist Al Hansen launched the underground magazine Kiss, which featured a column by Warhol. Later that year, Warhol co-founded Interview, which was initially focused on film criticism before evolving into a pop culture magazine by 1972.

Warhol also produced covers for major publications, including Time, Vogue, and Vanity Fair. For Time, he created artworks for cover stories such as "Today's Teen-Agers" (January 29, 1965), featuring a grid of seven photographic portraits; "The Flying Fondas and How They Grew" (February 16, 1970), depicting actors Jane, Henry, and Peter Fonda; "Why He's a Thriller" (March 19, 1984), portraying pop star Michael Jackson and resulting in the painting Michael Jackson (1984); "America Loves Listening to Lee" (September 1, 1985) depicting Lee Iacocca; and "Gotti on Trial" (September 19, 1986), featuring crime boss John Gotti. His magazine work also included a portrait of Princess Caroline of Monaco, for Vogue Paris (December 1983/January 1984), and Vanity Fair's commission of musician Prince for the November 1984 article "Purple Fame," resulting in Orange Prince (1984).

Photograph of Debbie Harry with Christopher Makos by Warhol, during her portrait session at the Factory, 1980

=== Photography and tape recordings ===
Warhol used photographs as the basis for his silkscreen paintings, later often relying on images he took himself with a Polaroid Big Shot camera. During portrait sessions, Warhol typically shot dozens of photographs of his subject, then selected one that would underlie the painting. Warhol was also an avid photographer and used the Polaroid SX-70 as a portable camera in the 1970s. He primarily used a Minox 35 EL from 1976 until his death in 1987 to produce a large, candid, diaristic body of photographs of Factory visitors, parties, friends, and celebrities. At one point, Warhol carried a portable tape recorder and camera wherever he went, recording nearly everything said and done. He referred to the recorder as his 'wife.' Some of these recordings became the basis for his literary work. He also taped interviews for Interview magazine and regularly published his Polaroid photos in its pages.

=== Fashion ===
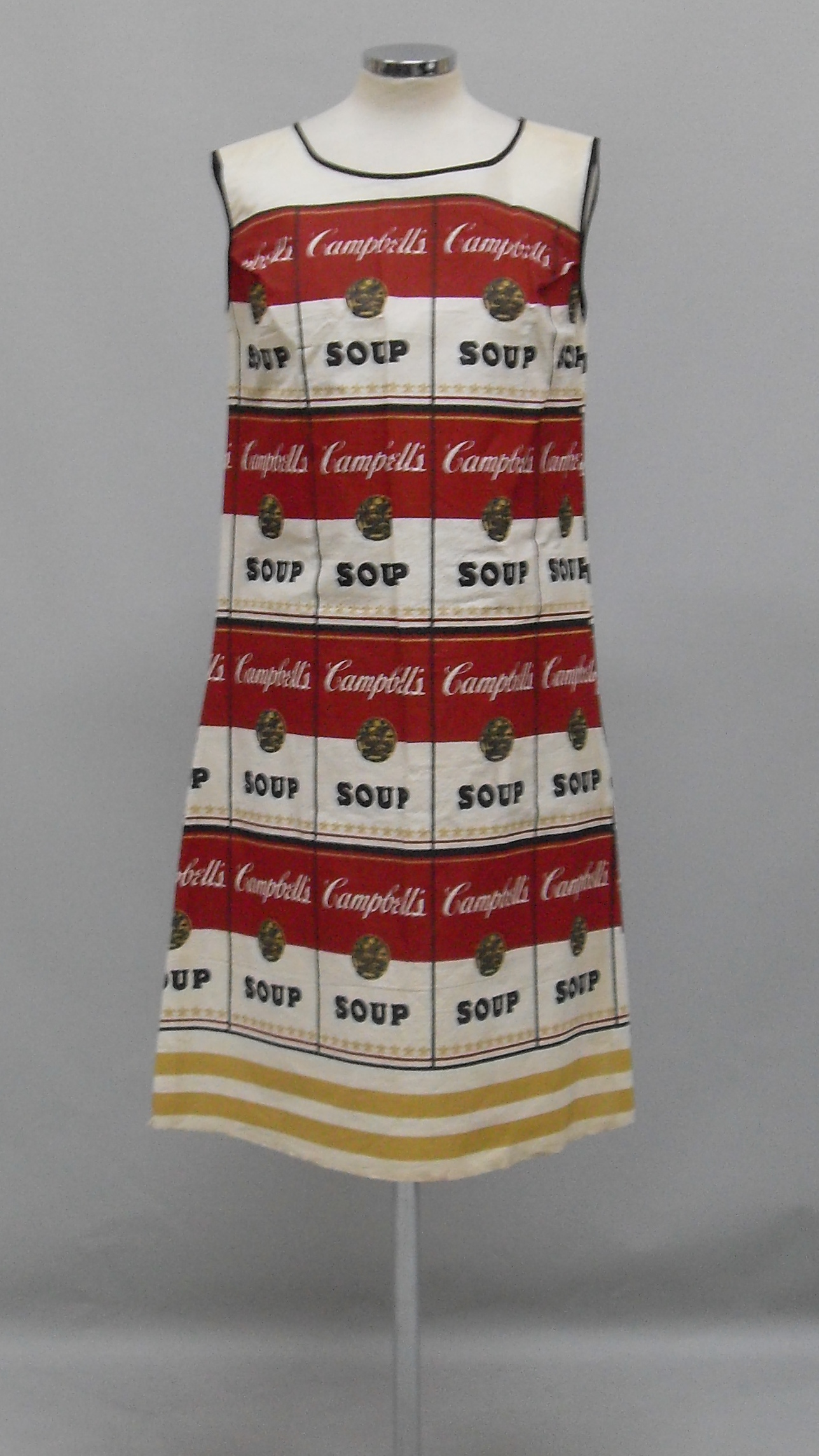
The Souper Dress (1967), based on Warhol's Campbell's Soup Cans

Drawing on his early career as a commercial illustrator and his engagement with celebrity and consumer culture, Warhol helped bridge the gap between fine art, fashion, and commerce. He once remarked, "Fashion is more art than art is … I'd rather buy a dress and put it, you know, up on the wall than put a painting." Often described as a modern dandy whose authority "rested more on presence than on words," Warhol moved fluidly between art and fashion, producing department store window displays, illustrations for Vogue and Harper's Bazaar, hosting a television program titled Fashion, and even working as a model.

In 1965, Warhol designed furs for Coopchik-Forrest, and in 1966, he participated in the paper dress craze when Brooklyn's Abraham & Straus invited him to decorate Mars Manufacturing paper dresses in-store. During the event, he silkscreened "FRAGILE" onto a dress worn by Nico—signing it "Dalí" in jest—and printed large bananas onto another; both were later donated to the Brooklyn Museum.

Several of Warhol's "superstars" also found success in the fashion world, including Baby Jane Holzer, Donyale Luna, International Velvet, Carol LaBrie, Jane Forth, and Donna Jordan, who worked as professional models in the 1960s and 1970s. Warhol also cultivated close relationships with leading fashion figures, including Diana Vreeland, Karl Lagerfeld, Yves Saint Laurent, Halston, Diane von Furstenberg, Calvin Klein, and Gianni Versace. In 1972, he collaborated with Halston, organizing his presentation for the Coty Awards.

== Public persona ==
The early 1960s were a pivotal period in the development of Warhol's public persona. Some scholars have suggested that his reluctance to speak about himself, and evasiveness in interviews can be traced to the years when the New York art world initially dismissed his work. In a 1963 Time magazine profile, Warhol was described as "perhaps the truest son of the age of automation." He explained his attraction to mechanical processes: "Paintings are too hard. The things I want to show are mechanical. Machines have less problems. I'd like to be a machine, wouldn't you?"

Early in his career, Warhol deliberately gave reporters conflicting accounts of his background, habits, and working methods, treating the press as the subject of a study. As he told People Weekly in 1976: "I used to like to give different information to different magazines because it was like putting a tracer on where people get their information." By planting small inconsistencies, he watched how stories circulated and evolved, turning interviews into part of his ongoing play with persona.

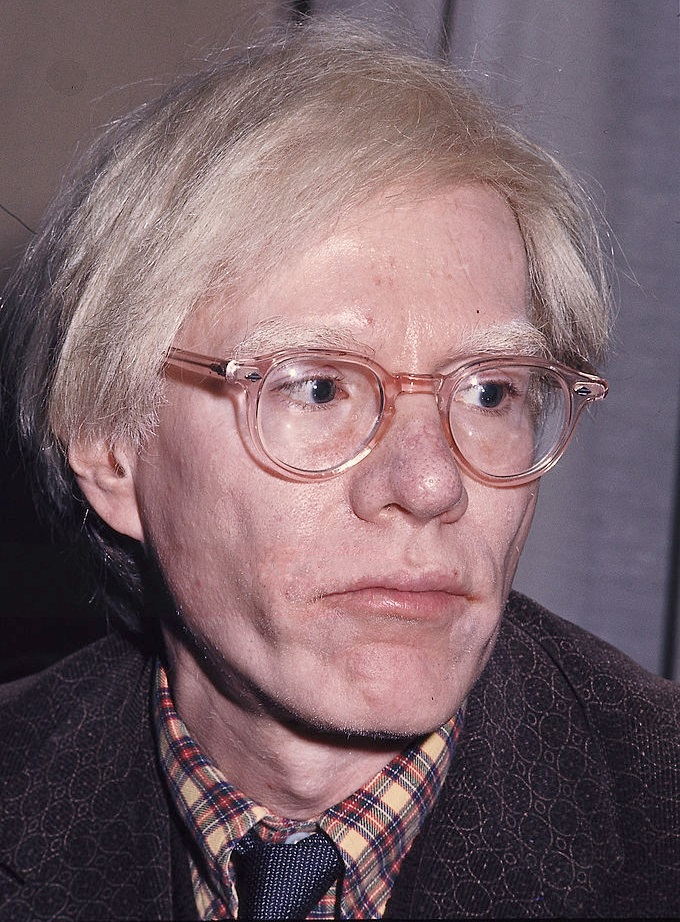
Warhol in Ferrara, 1975

Warhol usually encouraged others to speak for him in interviews. In public, he relied on an impersonal style of communication, mirroring his impulse to distance himself from the creation of his own artwork. He often hid behind a dazed expression and deadpan remarks—"gee," "uh," "really?"—and seemed to relish performing as a kind of "monosyllabic oddity" or "Keatonesque idiot savant" to the media. He once said, "If you want to know all about Andy Warhol just look at the surface of my paintings and films and me. There I am, there's nothing behind it."

His boyfriend Jed Johnson recalled, "He felt an artist should keep a neutral expression on his face when he showed his work to other people, that to betray pleasure or displeasure was... 'corny.' I'd watch him at many museum and gallery openings of his shows and he followed that policy consistently." Writer Gore Vidal described Warhol as "the only genius with an IQ of 85," adding that he did not mean the remark in a pejorative way and called Warhol "a cultural litmus paper" who satirized both modern art and cinema. Journalist Jerry Adler of the New York Daily News observed that what Warhol projected was "not merely nothing, but nothingness—a streak of nihilism… It is the charisma of the void; what draws people to Warhol is not his magnetism, but a vacuum."

In private, however, Warhol could reveal a markedly different side from his carefully constructed public persona. Former Interview editor Bob Colacello recalled that, in more intimate moments, Warhol expressed deep uncertainty about human relationships, noting that he often struggled to understand why others were happy. When Colacello suggested he show more emotion toward Johnson, Warhol replied, "If I let myself have emotions I would have a nervous breakdown." Photographer Billy Name similarly stated that Warhol's "personality was so vulnerable that it became a defense to put up the blank front."

== Personal life ==
=== Sexuality and relationships ===
Warhol lived as a gay man before the gay liberation movement, but often veiled his personal life from the press. In the 1950s, he submitted homoerotic drawings of nude males to a gallery, which were rejected for being too overt. In his book Popism, he recalled Emile de Antonio explaining that his flamboyance early in his career set him apart from closeted artists like Jasper Johns and Robert Rauschenberg: "you're too swish and that upsets them… major painters try to look straight; you play up the swish—it's like an armor with you." Warhol reflected, "I'd always had a lot of fun with that… I certainly wasn't a butch kind of guy by nature, but I must admit, I went out of my way to play up the other extreme."

Warhol expressed his queer identity through many of his artworks and films at a time when homosexuality in the United States was heavily stigmatized and legally constrained. In the 1960s, he produced films such as Blow Job (1964), My Hustler (1965), and Lonesome Cowboys (1968), which openly engaged with themes of sexuality and desire; several of his films were screened in gay pornographic theaters. He also created numerous paintings and photographs of male nudes. Critics interpret his series Torsos (1977), Sex Parts (1978), and Oxidation (1977–78) as his most direct explorations of homosexuality.

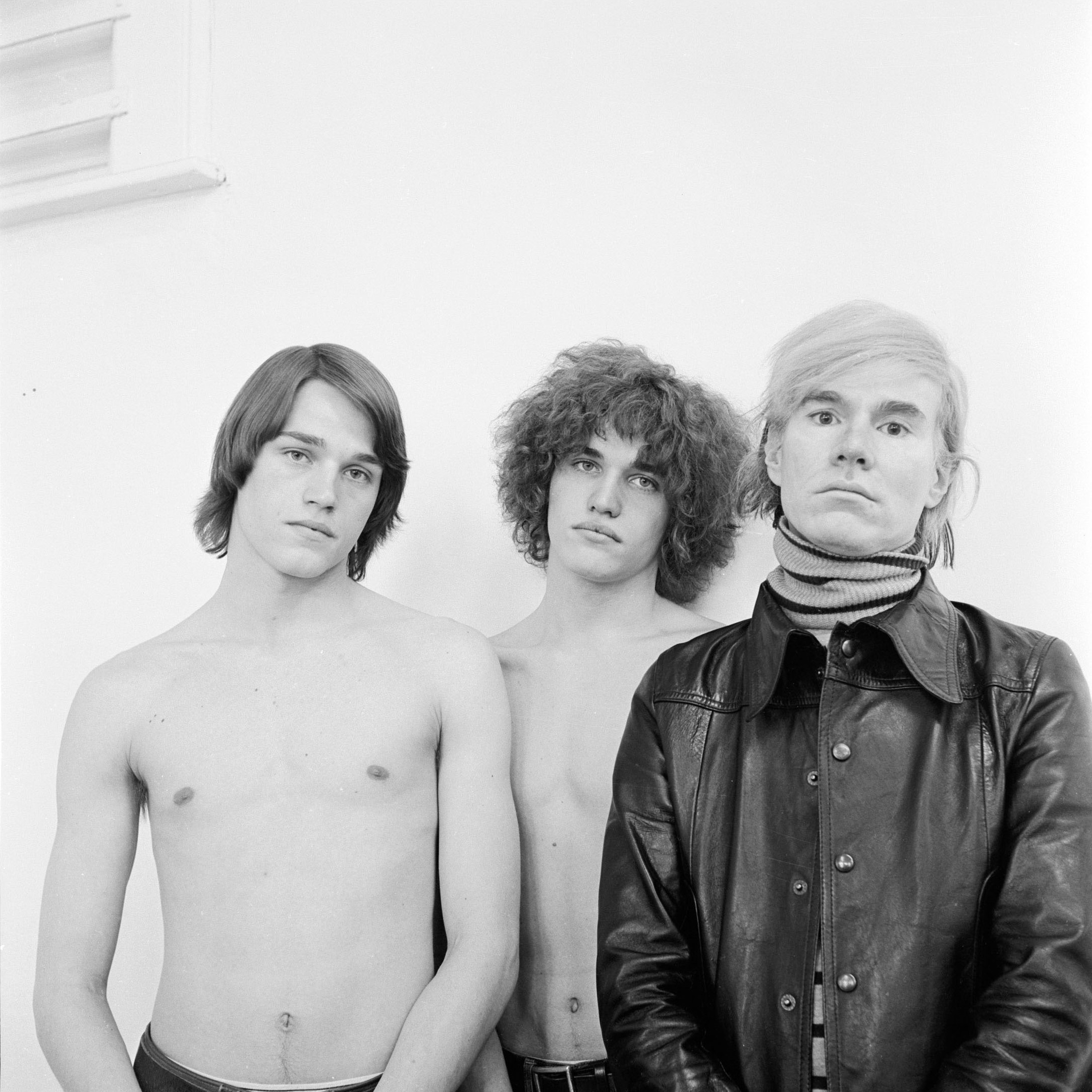
Warhol with his partner Jed Johnson and superstar Jay Johnson at the Factory by Cecil Beaton, 1969

Warhol said several times that he was a virgin. Former Interview editor Bob Colacello considered this plausible, suggesting that what little sex Warhol had was "a mixture of voyeurism and masturbation—to use [Warhol's] word abstract." However, this conflicts with Warhol's 1960 hospital treatment for condylomata, a sexually transmitted disease, and by friends who said they witnessed him having sex or heard him boast about it. Warhol had unrequited romantic feelings for production designer Charles Lisanby, who later recalled that Warhol said he had sex a few times but found it "messy and distasteful."

Warhol's own suggestion that he was asexual led many to view all his relationships as platonic. Jay Johnson, whose twin brother was Warhol's longtime partner, stated, "He enjoyed the idea that he was considered a voyeur and that he was considered asexual. That was his mystique." According to Billy Name, who was briefly Warhol's lover, "Andy's idea of sex was to have it once or twice and get it over with—with Andy it wasn't about love, it was about companionship."

Warhol referred to photographer Edward Wallowitch as his "first boyfriend." He later had relationships with artist John Giorno, Factory assistant Philip Fagan, art historian Robert Pincus-Witten, filmmaker Danny Williams, and Factory associates Richard Rheem and Rodney La Rod. His longest relationship was with Jed Johnson, who cared for him after he was shot, collaborated with him on films, and later achieved fame as an interior designer. They "functioned as husband and husband, sharing a bed and a domestic life" for 12 years. Warhol's close friend Stuart Pivar said he "had no sex life after Jed." After Johnson, Warhol dated Paramount Pictures executive Jon Gould, who described their relationship as "asexual" and called Warhol a "voyeur." Factory assistant Sam Bolton spent time with Warhol after Gould and contended that "he was not asexual. He would have had sex with me, if I had let him. He was too possessive. … I knew he considered me his boyfriend even though I wasn't."

=== Religion ===
Warhol was a practicing Ruthenian Catholic who regularly volunteered at homeless shelters and church soup kitchens in New York City. In 1980, he went to Vatican City to meet Pope John Paul II in St. Peter's Square. Those close to him regarded him as deeply religious. In 1966, his mother Julia Warhola described him as a "good religious boy" who attended Sunday Mass weekly at St. Paul's. In his eulogy for Warhol, art historian John Richardson likewise described his faith as devout and revealed that he financed his nephew's seminary education.

Father Sam Matarazzo, the prior of Saint Vincent Ferrer in Manhattan, later recalled that Warhol attended church two or three times a week, typically sitting or kneeling in the back pews to avoid recognition, though he was not observed receiving Communion or going to Confession. Warhol didn't visit unfamiliar churches because he felt self-conscious about crossing himself in the "Orthodox way," and feared drawing attention to himself. Warhol's partner, Jed Johnson, once asked him what he prayed for, to which he replied, "Cash." Journalist Maralyn Lois Polak asked Warhol if being Catholic helped him "be a better artist," and he responded, "Yeah." When asked how, he quipped, "I didn't have to go to a psychiatrist, I could go to a priest."

Images of Jesus in Last Supper (1986)

Warhol was referred to as the "Pope of Pop Art." Religious themes appeared frequently in his work, including the film Imitation of Christ (1967), Crosses (1982), Details of Renaissance Paintings (1984), and the Last Supper series (1986), which is the largest body of religious-themed works by an American artist. Additional religious works were found posthumously in his estate, reflecting the influence of Eastern Christian iconography. The Brooklyn Museum's 2021–2022 exhibition Andy Warhol: Revelation further explored the role of faith in his life and art.

=== Time Capsules and collection ===
Warhol was an avid collector and was described as a "pack rat" who would save everything. Beginning in 1974, he assembled his Time Capsules, a long-running conceptual project consisting of 610 containers filled with letters, photographs, memorabilia, and ephemera from his daily life. These materials, along with similar items stored at his home, were later transferred to the Andy Warhol Museum in Pittsburgh.

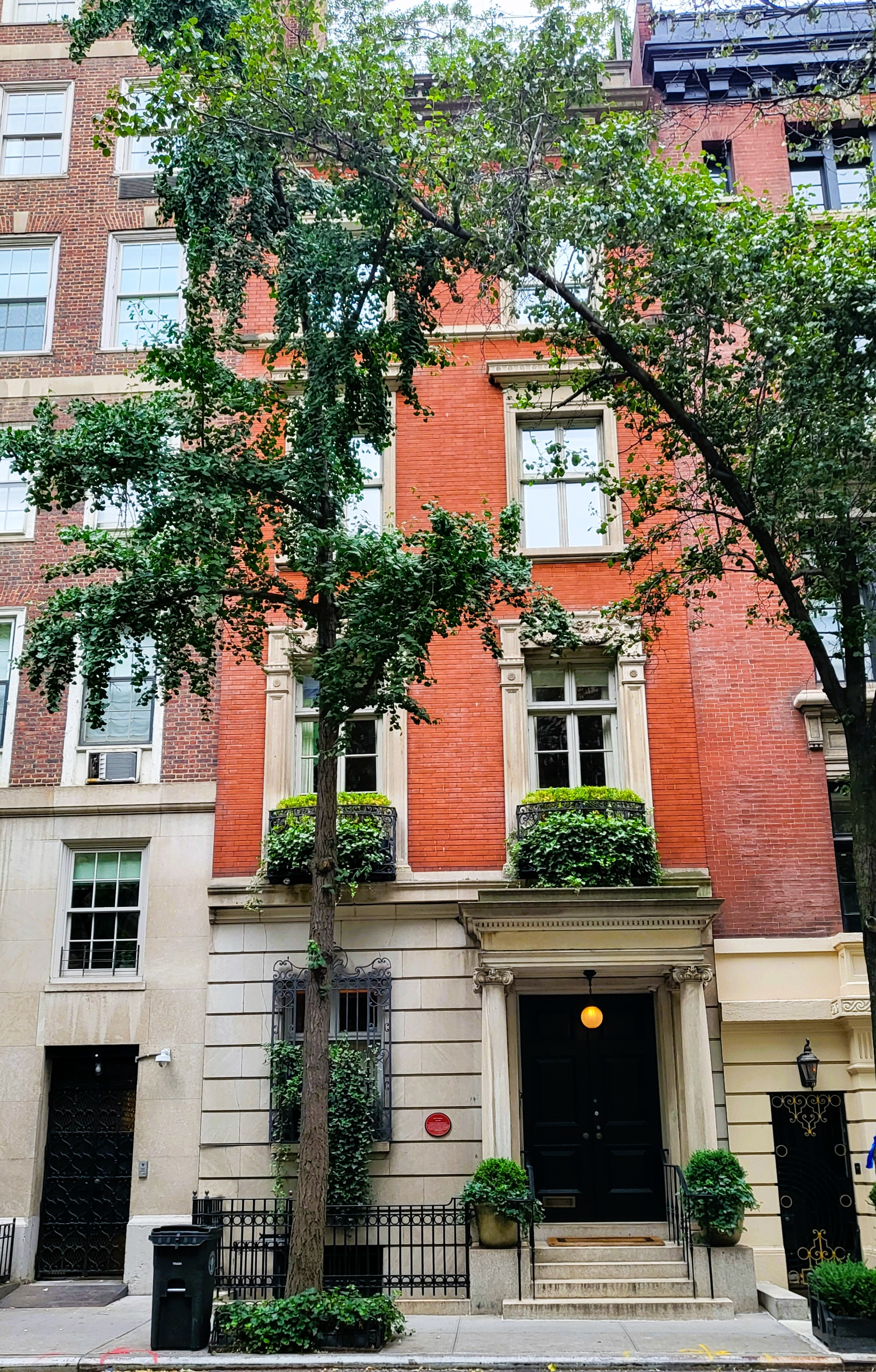
From 1974 to 1987, Warhol lived at 57 East 66th Street in Lenox Hill, Manhattan. In 1998, the townhouse was designated a cultural landmark.

Warhol's Factory at 860 Broadway featured Art Deco furnishings he had acquired secondhand for his film L'Amour (1972). He had an extensive folk art collection, which was the subject of the exhibition Andy Warhol's Folk and Funk at the Museum of American Folk Art in 1977, though the full extent of his holdings remained largely unknown during his lifetime.

Warhol kept his wealth and possessions largely concealed, storing valuables in unconventional places such as cookie tins atop the canopy of his bed and his mattress. He owned luxury cars, including a Rolls-Royce Silver Shadow, though he did not drive. In 1974, Warhol and his live-in boyfriend Jed Johnson moved into a townhouse at 57 East 66th Street, where Johnson decorated the interiors in a mix of Neoclassical, Art Deco, and Victorian styles and kept the household organized. After Johnson's departure in December 1980, the townhouse became filled with Warhol's accumulating purchases.

Warhol frequently browsed flea markets and auction houses with collector Stuart Pivar, envisioning a large-scale retail and exhibition space dubbed "Warhol Hall." His collection ranged widely, including American Indian artifacts, cookie jars, gemstones, antique furniture, and fine art. He owned works by 19th-century artists, his peers, and collaborators, though he avoided displaying his own work. He also amassed a personal library of more than 1,200 books. Following Warhol's death in 1987, his collection was auctioned at Sotheby's in 1988, dispersing nearly 10,000 objects and generating $25.3 million during the 10-day sale. A further cache of jewelry was later discovered and sold separately for $1.6 million.

== Legacy ==
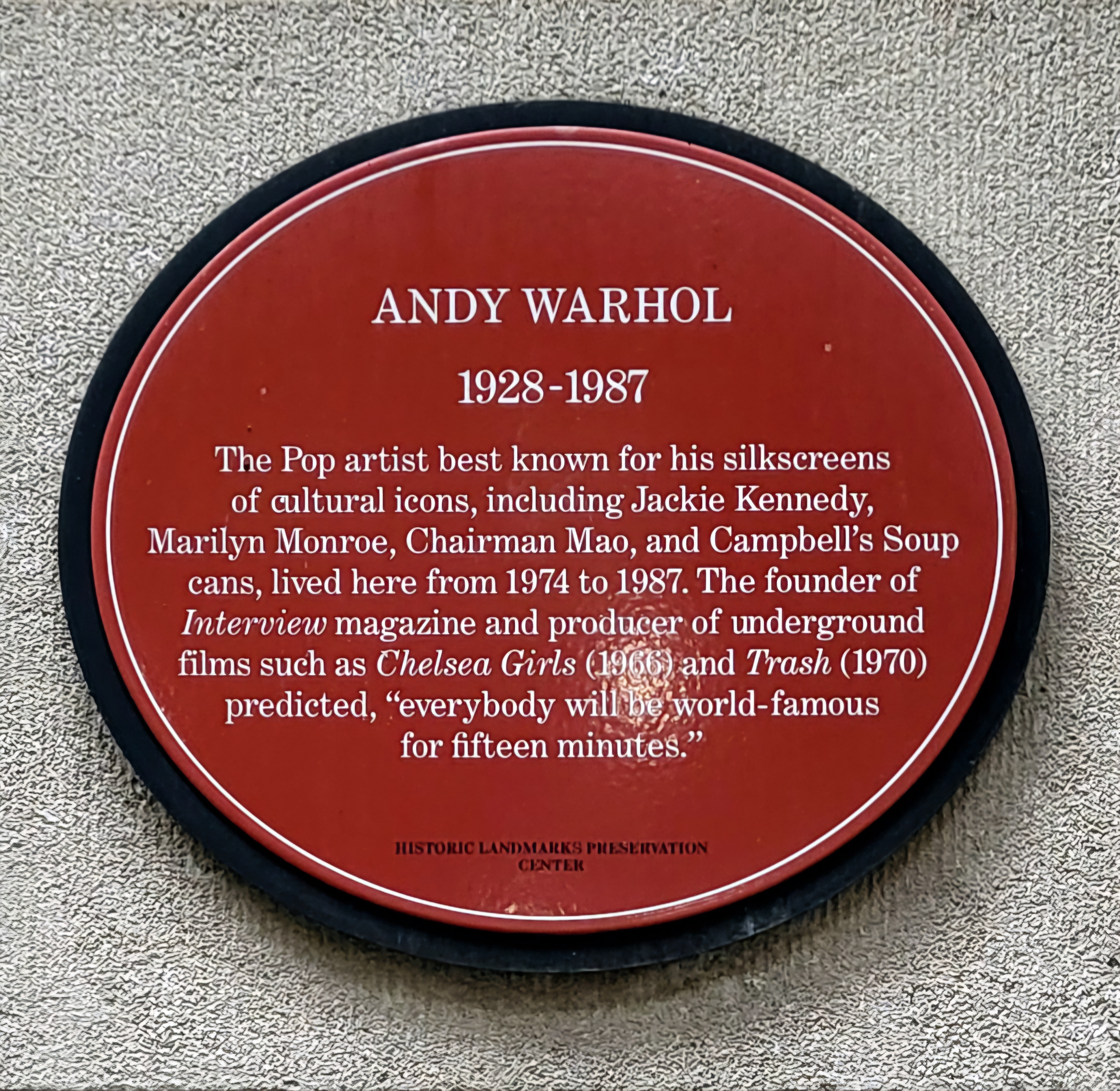
A plaque honoring his life, mounted outside his home at 57 East 66th Street in Manhattan's Lenox Hill neighborhood

In 1991, the Warhol Family Museum of Modern Art was established in Medzilaborce, Slovakia, by Warhol's family and the Slovak Ministry of Culture. In 1996, it was renamed the Andy Warhol Museum of Modern Art.

In 1992, Warhol's estate donated 15 acres of land on his former property Eothen to The Nature Conservancy. Now called The Andy Warhol Preserve, it is part of a 2,400-acre protected area in Montauk.

In 1994, the Andy Warhol Museum opened in Pittsburgh. It holds the largest collection of the artist's works in the world.

In 1998, Warhol's Upper East Side townhouse at 57 East 66th Street in Manhattan was designated a cultural landmark by the Historical Landmarks Preservation Center to commemorate the 70th anniversary of his birthday.

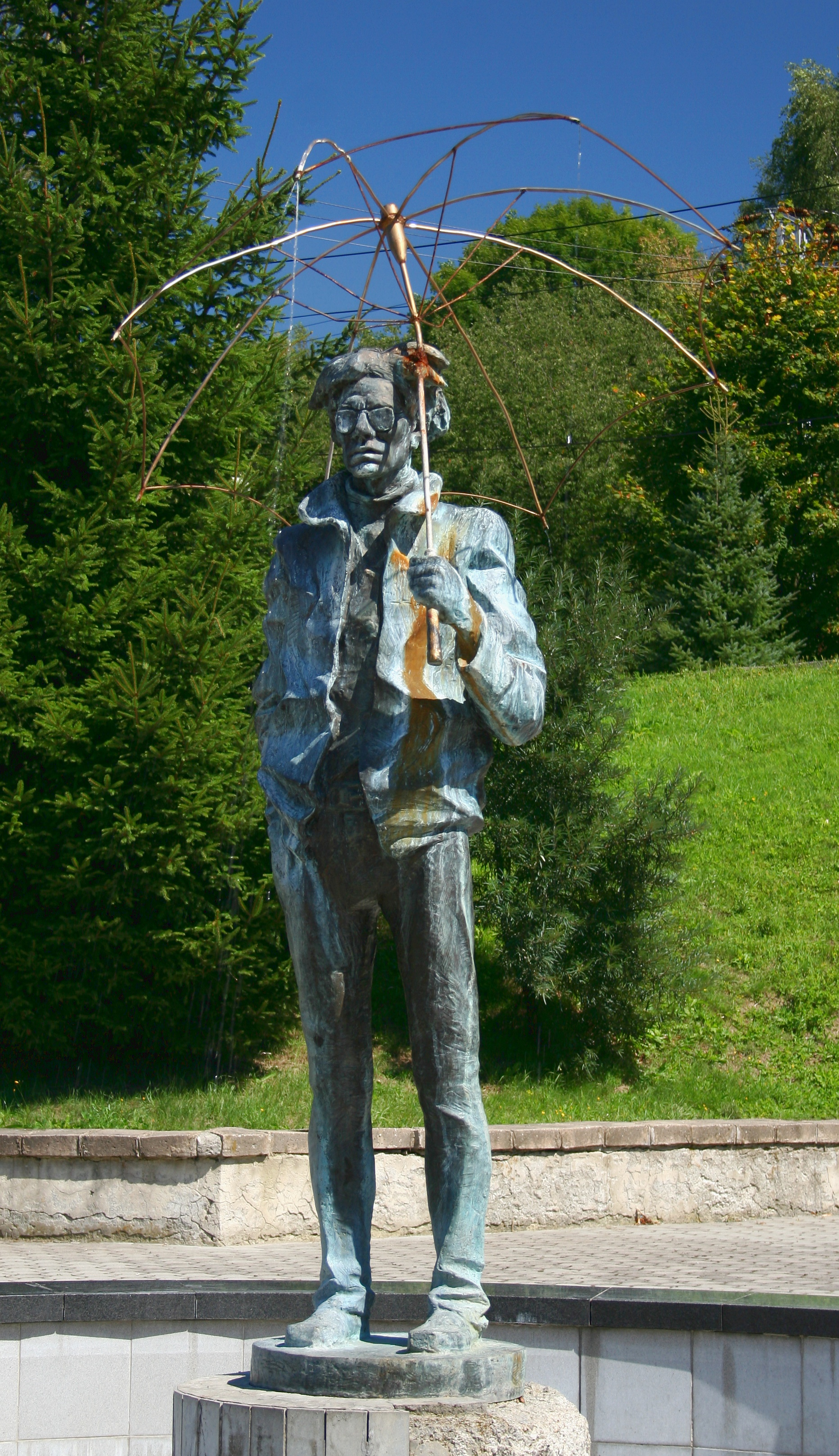
Statue at the Andy Warhol Museum of Modern Art in Medzilaborce, Slovakia

In 2002, the US Postal Service issued an 18-cent stamp commemorating Warhol. Designed by Richard Sheaff of Scottsdale, Arizona, the stamp was unveiled at a ceremony at the Andy Warhol Museum and features Warhol's 1964 painting Self-Portrait.

In 2005, the Seventh Street Bridge in Pittsburgh was renamed the Andy Warhol Bridge in his honor.

Commissioned by the Public Art Fund, artist Rob Pruitt created a chrome sculpture of Warhol that was installed outside 860 Broadway—the former site of the Factory—in Manhattan's Union Square from March to October 2011.

The International Astronomical Union named a crater on the planet Mercury after Warhol in 2012.

In 2013, to honor the 85th anniversary of Warhol's birthday, the Andy Warhol Museum and EarthCam launched a collaborative project titled Figment, a live feed of Warhol's gravesite.

In 2024, Warhol was posthumously awarded the Order of the White Double Cross of the Second Class by the Slovak Republic's ambassador to the U.S. on the 37th anniversary of his death, at the behest of Slovak President Zuzana Čaputová, "for promoting the Slovak Republic's good name abroad."

In 2025, Warhol was selected as one of the first 10 inductees into the Pittsburgh Walk of Fame.

In 2026, the Pittsburgh Penguins used Warhol’s pop art design for their “Hometown Remix” jersey, giving the classic skating penguin crest a 1960s screen-print look built from halftone dots made famous by Warhol's art and offset color on a navy base.

=== The Andy Warhol Foundation for the Visual Arts ===
Warhol's will stipulated that his entire estate—aside from modest bequests to his business manager and brothers—be used to establish a foundation. In 1987, the Andy Warhol Foundation for the Visual Arts was established to administer his estate and support contemporary visual art, particularly experimental work. The foundation later created the Andy Warhol Art Authentication Board in 1995 to evaluate works attributed to Warhol, though it was dissolved in 2012 following costly legal disputes.

The foundation is among the largest grant-giving organizations for the visual arts in the United States. It has donated more than 3,000 works to the Andy Warhol Museum in Pittsburgh and oversees publication of the Andy Warhol Catalogue Raisonné, a multi-volume scholarly catalogue of Warhol's paintings and sculptures.

== Filmography ==
- The Illiac Passion (1967)
- The Driver's Seat (1974)
- Cocaine Cowboys (1979)
- Tootsie (1982)

== See also ==
- Counterculture of the 1960s
- Andy Warhol Foundation v. Goldsmith
