= Orange Prince =

1984 painting by Andy Warhol

- Artist: Andy Warhol
- Year: 1984
- Catalogue: Catalogued in Andy Warhol Foundation records: PA.50.541 (verso); stamped with Estate of Andy Warhol and Andy Warhol Foundation Stamps
- Type: Painting, Printmaking
- Medium: Synthetic polymer paint and silkscreen on canvas
- Subject: Prince
- Dimensions: 50.8 cm × 40.64 cm (20 in × 16 in)
- Location: London
- Owner: Private British collector

Orange Prince is a 1984 painting by American artist Andy Warhol. Created using Warhol's silkscreen technique, the work is based on a 1981 photograph of musician Prince by Lynn Goldsmith. Warhol was commissioned by Vanity Fair to produce a portrait of Prince in 1984, which was published in the magazine to accompany an article on the musician's success following Purple Rain. He subsequently created additional silkscreen variations that together form the Prince Series, comprising twelve silkscreen paintings distinguished by color, along with two screenprints on paper and two drawings.

The Prince Series was not commissioned by Prince but was produced by Warhol for his personal collection. Following Warhol's death in 1987, Orange Prince passed to the Andy Warhol Foundation for the Visual Arts and is now held in a private collection.

The series later became the subject of a high-profile copyright dispute between Goldsmith and the Warhol Foundation, culminating in the 2023 Andy Warhol Foundation for the Visual Arts, Inc. v. Goldsmith decision, in which the Supreme Court of the United States ruled against the Foundation's fair use claim.

== Background ==
Orange Prince is based on a black-and-white studio portrait of musician Prince taken by photographer Lynn Goldsmith in December 1981. In 1984, Vanity Fair licensed the photograph for $400 and commissioned Warhol to create an illustration for the article "Purple Fame." The magazine credited Goldsmith as the source of the photograph. Warhol cropped the image and transformed it by applying "loud, unnatural" colors and simplifying features, creating a work that was immediately recognizable as a Warhol rather than a photographic portrait.

Warhol then created 15 other variants of the Prince portrait for his private collection, which became collectively known as the Prince Series; these variants were neither commissioned by Goldsmith, Vanity Fair, Condé Nast, nor Prince himself.

=== Prince and Warhol ===
Prince and Warhol were personally acquainted, as documented in The Andy Warhol Diaries (1989). In the early 1980s, Prince appeared in Warhol's Interview magazine on multiple occasions. The April 1980 issue featured a full-page photograph by Robert Mapplethorpe.

Warhol attended a few Prince concerts, including one of the musician's earliest New York performances. On December 9, 1980, Prince played The Ritz as part of his Dirty Mind Tour. British music critic Nik Cohn noted: "Andy Warhol and his claque showed up, and so did a number of music-biz faces. Before the show, they lounged in poses of practised cool. Then Prince appeared, and cool went up in flames."

In December 1981, Interview published a controversial image of Prince in the shower, with a crucifix on the wall behind him.

On August 2, 1986, Warhol and his friend Wilfredo Rosado attended Prince's concert at Madison Square Garden during the Parade Tour, writing in his diary: "…we sat down just as Prince jumps out naked, or almost, and it's the greatest concert I've ever seen there, just so much energy and excitement." Afterward, at an after-party at the Palladium nightclub, Warhol described Prince as a gracious host, noting how he remembered Rosado's name and made sure to dance with all guests. Warhol also observed the presence of Billy Idol and commented that the "Hollywood glamour girls" of the past had been replaced by "glamour boys" such as Prince and Idol—a phenomenon he found "…so weird." That night, Prince agreed to appear on the December 1986 cover of Interview magazine. Warhol recalled in his diary: "We asked Prince if he would be our December cover and he said we'd have to talk to his manager and we said that we'd asked the manager and the manager said to ask him, and so they said they'd work it out. We were just shaking, it was so exciting."

== Composition ==
The composition of Orange Prince directly references the portrait style Warhol developed in the 1960s. The subject's face is rendered in neon orange against a matching ground, with features and hair defined in black. Accents of green and blue interlace with the linework, producing a luminescent effect. The minimal shading contributes to the characteristically flat surface associated with Warhol's style. Following Prince's death, his sister, Tyka Nelson, noted that his favorite color was orange—not purple as has been widely assumed—and that he often wore all-orange stage outfits, performed on orange concert sets, and favored his custom-built orange Cloud guitar.

The use of bright colors in Warhol's work serves to draw renewed attention to the subject. In his Death and Disaster series, graphic images sourced from contemporary tabloid newspapers are juxtaposed with a candy-colored palette, creating a stark contrast. A notable example is Twelve Electric Chairs (1964), which presents twelve highly contrasting images of an electric chair, including Orange Little Electric Chair (1964).

Orange Marilyn (1962), is a silkscreen painting by Warhol from the Marilyn Flavors series. It's one of the first silkscreen portraits created by Warhol in this style, and Orange Prince is one of Warhol's last portraits in this style.

In his 2018 analysis, art historian Thomas E. Crow compares it to Warhol's Marilyn series, in which the subject's head "floats" amid a vibrant background color. He distinguishes the work from Warhol’s later commissioned portraits—such as his depiction of Michael Jackson—which generally followed a more standardized, commercial format. As Crow writes: "Warhol's 1984 portraits (of Prince) … harked back to the independently conceived celebrity likenesses of his earlier career (from the 1960s). As Prince had not commissioned any of the paintings, Warhol could experiment with far more variations in background patterns and colors."

=== Warhol's orange paintings ===
A number of important silkscreen works by Warhol use the color orange. Some of the first silkscreen works from the 1960s use orange as the dominant color, and Warhol continued to use orange in his paintings throughout his lifetime. Orange Prince shares a compositional style to Orange Marilyn (1962). Several orange paintings by Warhol are in museum collections around the world:

- Shot Orange Marilyn, 1964 (40 in x 40 in).
- Orange Car Crash Fourteen Times, 1963.
- Orange Disaster #5 1963.
- Orange Car Crash (5 Deaths 11 Times in Orange) (Orange Disaster), 1963.
- 5 Deaths on Orange (Orange Disaster), 1963.
- Orange Little Electric Chair, 1964.
- Marilyn Diptych, 1962
- Orange Marilyn (1962) (20 in x 16 in), reportedly sold in a private transaction to Citadel founder Ken Griffin for what two sources close to the transaction said was $240 million.

== Technique ==
Orange Prince was produced using silkscreen printing, combining layers of silkscreen ink with a hand-painted orange ground of acrylic polymer on canvas. The method, popularized by Warhol in the 1960s, became synonymous with his practice, particularly in early celebrity portraits of figures such as Marilyn Monroe, Elvis Presley, Elizabeth Taylor, and Marlon Brando.

A detailed account of Warhol's technique appears in the 1989 Museum of Modern Art catalogue, in an essay by Marco Livingstone titled "Do It Yourself: Notes on Warhol's Technique." Livingstone describes how a pencil tracing from a photographic acetate was transferred to establish color areas, which were then hand-painted—often with masking tape—before the black silkscreened image was applied. As he notes, "a rough guide was established for each color area, for example, the lips and the eyelids. The colors were then brushed on by hand, often with the use of masking tape to create a clean junction between them, with the eventual imposition of the black screened image also serving to obscure any unevenness in the line." Warhol reviewed the acetates prior to screening, marking adjustments to increase contrast and flatten tonal variation, and the final image was aligned and printed using taped guides to position the screen.

== Analysis ==
Geralyn Huxley, curator of film and video at the Andy Warhol Museum in Pittsburgh, believes Warhol's preoccupation with celebrity portraits and the style in which he depicts them, stems from the artist's religious upbringing. As a child, Warhol attended a local Catholic church, which featured an iconostasis, a screen situated in front of the altar featuring large-scale depictions of the faces of the Saints.

Art historian Jane Daggett Dillenberger, in her book The Religious Art of Andy Warhol, points out that Warhol's portraits of celebrities have a strong affinity with the sacred icons at the St. John Chrysostom Byzantine Catholic Church in Pittsburgh: "Andy's earliest experience of art was of religious art … for Andy, art and religion were linked."

In his New York Times review of the 1989 Warhol retrospective exhibition at MoMA, art critic Michael Brenson says that Warhol's portraits, at their best, bring together diametrically opposite values, such as sensual excess and the purity of an icon, as seen in the portrait of Prince:

"[Andy Warhol's] flat images, painted in a flat tone, existing in a non-space from which past and future have been banished … make the present seem absolute and eternal—in other words, transcendent. Part of Warhol's achievement was to legitimize his love of secular, profane subjects by attaching to them traditional religious values. … Warhol argues that self-effacement and sensual excess, purity and trash, the moment and eternity can exist together."

Art historian Thomas E. Crow interprets Orange Prince as depicting the musician as a "modern-day icon," drawing on the visual language of religious iconography. Crow suggests that Warhol was fascinated by Prince, a young star outside his usual circle, and was inspired by the musician's edgy image. As he writes: "[Warhol's portraits of Prince] returned Warhol to the origins of his art-critical credibility, that is, the flattened, emblematic, minimally descriptive manner that had characterized his first, definitive phase as an artist."

Crow also notes that the work demonstrates greater freedom of expression, reminiscent of Warhol’s early portraits, in contrast to the more standardized, commissioned "factory-line" portraits of the 1970s and later. He concludes that Orange Prince exemplifies Warhol's ability to merge celebrity portraiture with personal artistic experimentation, producing a work that is both iconic and innovative.

== Publications ==
Orange Prince has been reproduced in books, magazines, and other media, most notably on the cover of a commemorative magazine published by Condé Nast following Prince's death in 2016.

The painting appeared on the cover of The Genius of Prince, a collector's edition magazine published by Condé Nast in June 2016 and distributed internationally, commemorating the musician's sudden death.

Orange Prince was featured in full color in the November 1984 and April 2016 issues of Vanity Fair, accompanying the article "Purple Fame," which chronicles Prince's rise to international fame following his 1984 album and film Purple Rain. The article describes Warhol's portrait as capturing the recording artist "…at the height of his powers," presenting him as confident and celebrated on the global stage.

Orange Prince and other works from the Prince Series have been widely covered in newspapers, magazines, and online publications worldwide, including The New York Times, Artnet, The Washington Post, Smithsonian, and Artforum.

Books and Catalogues

- Andy Warhol: The Complete Commissioned Magazine Work (Prestel Verlag, 2014), edited by Paul Marechal
- Andy Warhol Treasures (Goodman/Carlton Books, 2009), edited by Matt Wrbican and Geralyn Huxley
- Warhol Live (Prestel Publishing, 2008), edited by Stephane Aquin
- Andy Warhol Portraits (Phaidon, 2007), edited by Tony Shafrazi
- Andy Warhol Prints: A Catalogue Raisonné 1962–1987, 4th edition (D.A.P., 2003), edited by Frayda Feldman and Jörg Schellmann
- Andy Warhol Portraits (Thames and Hudson Ltd., 1993), edited by Henry Geldzahler and Robert Rosenblum

== Exhibitions ==
Works from the Prince Series have been widely exhibited at major galleries and institutions worldwide, including:

- 2019: Andy Warhol: Portraits, McNay Art Museum, San Antonio, TX
- 2015: Andy Warhol: Portraits, Phoenix Art Museum, Phoenix, AZ.
- 2010: Andy Warhol: Portraits, The Andy Warhol Museum, Pittsburgh, PA.
- 2009–2011: Warhol Live toured North America and Europe, with exhibitions at the Montreal Museum of Fine Arts, Montreal, Canada; The Andy Warhol Museum, Pittsburgh, PA; The Frist Center for the Visual Arts, Nashville, TN; and the de Young Museum, San Francisco, CA. The exhibition explored Warhol’s work through the lens of music, drawing primarily from the museum's collection.
- 2008: Andy Warhol's Celebrities, Coskun Fine Art, London.
- 2005: Tony Shafrazi Gallery, New York, NY.
- 1993: Andy Warhol: Portraits of the Seventies and Eighties, Museum of Contemporary Art Australia, Sydney; Anthony d’Offay Gallery, London.

== Provenance ==
Orange Prince is held in a private British collection. The painting was previously part of Andy Warhol's personal collection, and passed from his estate to the Andy Warhol Foundation for the Visual Arts before being acquired by the current owner.

== Copyright infringement case ==
In 1984, Vanity Fair licensed a 1981 black-and-white portrait of Prince by Lynn Goldsmith for $400 and commissioned Warhol to create an illustration for the article "Purple Fame," published in the November issue, crediting Goldsmith as the source. After Prince's death in 2016, Condé Nast published its commemorative magazine with one of the Prince Series variants as the cover image. Despite originally licensing the photograph and the co-credit in Vanity Fair back in 1984, Goldsmith alleged that she had been unaware of the existence of the illustration and the Prince Series until 2016, over 30 years later when she saw the Vanity Fair cover. Furthermore, Condé Nast only credited the Andy Warhol Foundation in the 2016 magazine and did not mention her.

Goldsmith informed the Foundation that she believed these additional works were copyright violations of her photograph and stated her intent to seek legal action. The Foundation first filed for a preliminary ruling in the U.S. Southern District Court of New York, which then ruled in 2019 that Warhol had transformed Goldsmith's original photograph under fair use. Goldsmith then appealed to the Second Circuit Court of Appeals, which ruled in her favor in 2021. The Foundation then appealed to the U.S Supreme Court; in March 2022 the U.S. Supreme Court granted the Foundation's petition for writ of certiorari to determine the nature and definition of transformative use, to be heard in their 2022-23 term. In May 2023, the Supreme Court ruled 7–2 that the Foundation's reuse of the Orange Prince image to Condé Nast was not substantially different from Goldsmith's photo and its use was commercial, thus a fair use defense did not apply, a decision in favor of Goldsmith.
