= Jean-Michel Basquiat (Warhol) =

1982 painting by Andy Warhol

- Artist: Andy Warhol
- Year: 1982
- Medium: Metallic pigment, acrylic, silkscreen ink and urine on canvas
- Movement: Pop Art
- Subject: Jean-Michel Basquiat
- Dimensions: 100 cm × 100 cm (40 in × 40 in)
- Location: Private collection

Jean-Michel Basquiat is a painting created by American artist Andy Warhol in 1982. Warhol made multiple silkscreen "piss paintings" of artist Jean-Michel Basquiat using his Oxidation painting technique.

== Background ==
In 1979, street artist Jean-Michel Basquiat, then working under the moniker SAMO, approached Pop artist Andy Warhol, who was dining with curator Henry Geldzahler in a SoHo restaurant, and sold him a postcard. Basquiat subsequently attempted to enter Warhol's studio, the Factory, but was denied, according to Warhol's studio assistant Ronnie Cutrone. In 1982, Basquiat told Art in America: "I was also selling handmade postcards, and handpainted Abstract Expressionist sweatshirts, to make money. I even went to Interview magazine and bugged Andy Warhol, you know, to find out how to get closer to it." Warhol purchased a few of the painted sweatshirts. "I just wanted to meet him, he was an art hero of mine," Basquiat later said.

By 1982, Basquiat made the transition from graffiti artist to one of the leading figures in the Neo-expressionism movement. Gallerist Bruno Bischofberger became Basquiat's art dealer and gave him a one-man show at his Zurich gallery in September 1982. Bischofberger also represented Warhol and arranged a lunch meeting between the two artists on October 4, 1982. Warhol documented the meeting in a diary entry, which was posthumously published in The Andy Warhol Diaries (1989):

Down to meet Bruno Bischofberger (cab $7.50). He brought Jean-Michel Basquiat with him. He's the kid who used the name "Samo" when he used to sit on the sidewalk in Greenwich Village and paint T-shirts, and I'd give him $10 here and there…He's just one of those kids who drove me crazy. He's black but some people say he's Puerto Rican so I don't know. And then Bruno discovered him and now he’s on Easy Street. He's got a great loft on Christie Street. He was a middle-class Brooklyn kid—I mean, he went to college and things—and he was trying to be like that, painting in the Greenwich Village. And so had lunch for them and then I took a Polaroid and he went home and within two hours a painting was back, still wet, of him and me together. And I mean, just getting to Christie Street must have taken an hour. He told me his assistant painted it.

This meeting established a friendship between them: "Warhol the established master of Pop Art, and Basquiat, the brash wunderkind of the New York art scene." Basquiat created the painting Dos Cabezas (1982) based on one of the Polaroids Warhol took of them, and Warhol created multiple portraits of Basquiat from a Polaroid he took of him.

== Technique ==
Jean-Michel Basquiat was created using a complex tracing and silkscreening process, using layers of colors of silkscreen ink on top of a background of acrylic polymer paint, applied to a 40-by-40-inch canvas. It is also one of Warhol's "piss paintings," meaning the colors were oxidized by evaporating urine.

Warhol began experimenting with urine in the early 1960s, and in 1977 he "developed the piss-painting technique as a way of introducing a random element—an ironic paraphrase of the hero of Abstract Expressionism, Jackson Pollock, with his drip technique." Warhol coated the canvas with copper paint and either he or an assistant urinated directly onto the canvas. Warhol noted in his diary that he preferred the "contributions" of his assistant Ronnie Cutrone "because he takes a lot of vitamin B so the canvas turns a really pretty color when it’s his piss."

== Collections ==
One portrait is part of the permanent collection of The Andy Warhol Museum in Pittsburgh.American businessman Peter Brant, a major collector of both Warhol and Basquiat, owned one of the portraits.

== Art market ==
In November 2021, Brant sold his Jean-Michel Basquiat portrait at Christie's in New York for $40 million.
