= Benjamin Liu =

Taiwanese-born designer and drag queen (born 1952)

Benjamin Liu (born 1952), also known as Ming Vauze, is a Taiwanese-born designer, creative producer, and drag queen. He is best known for serving as Pop artist Andy Warhol's personal assistant from 1982 to 1986. Before joining Warhol's Factory, Liu worked for Venezuelan artist and window dresser Victor Hugo. After relocating from San Francisco to New York City in the late 1970s, Liu became involved in the city's downtown nightclub scene as a drag performer. During the 1980s, he worked as a jewelry designer before expanding into nightclub design. In 1996, Liu co-authored the book Unseen Warhol with John O'Connor.

== Life and career ==
=== Early life ===
Benjamin Liu was born in Taipei, Taiwan. Because his father was a diplomat for the Taiwanese government, he spent his childhood in several countries, including Turkey, the Philippines, Taiwan, Cyprus, and the United States. At the age of 13, his family moved to the San Francisco Bay Area during the height of hippie culture in the 1960s. He attended Sunnyvale High School in Sunnyvale, California.

=== Career ===
In the late 1970s, while living in San Francisco, Liu became interested in the work of Venezuelan artist Victor Hugo after reading an article about him in the Italian fashion magazine L'Uomo Vogue. Hoping to introduce Hugo's work to his then-boyfriend, Liu contacted the Halston boutique where Hugo was a window dresser. Unknowingly, he was connected to fashion designer Halston's residence because Hugo was living him. Hugo accepted an invitation to visit Liu in San Francisco, where the two became friends.

Hugo then invited Liu to New York City, where Liu stayed with Hugo's assistant, Lorenzo Velasquez, in Times Square. During the visit, Hugo took Liu to the premiere of Bad (1977), the film directed by Andy Warhol's partner Jed Johnson, at the RKO Cinerama Theatre in Times Square. Inspired by the city's cultural scene, Liu later relocated to New York. By then, Hugo had moved into a loft at 109 Fifth Avenue, where he offered Liu a place to stay. Liu subsequently worked as Hugo's assistant for approximately three years, assisting with creative projects while becoming involved in New York's downtown art and nightclub scene.

During this period, Liu began performing in drag under the stage name Ming Vauze. He lip-synched to records at New York nightclubs such as Xenon and the Pyramid Club.

In September 1982, Warhol hired Liu as his bodyguard. He was soon promoted to personal and studio assistant. Liu became a close friend and accompanied Warhol to social engagements. In 1984, Warhol photographed Liu dressed up as Ming Vauze for Vogue Paris. Working closely with Warhol during the artist's final years, Liu assisted in the production of several portrait commissions and series at the Factory. In 1986, Liu photographed Warhol wearing a black turtleneck and his "fright wig." These Polaroid photographs became the source material for Warhol's final Self-Portrait paintings, produced for Anthony d'Offay Gallery in London.

In January 1986, Liu informed Warhol that he was leaving to devote himself full-time to his growing costume jewelry business. In The Andy Warhol Diaries, Warhol described the news as "tragic" and said that Liu "was special," adding that "an era has ended." Liu continued to occasionally visit Warhol's studio on Fridays until his death in 1987. Liu later recalled that Warhol encouraged the arrangement by joking that he would give him a box of chocolates each time he came by, a promise that he kept.

In February 1987, Liu organized Koshin Satoh's fashion show at the Tunnel nightclub in New York City. The runway presentation featured Warhol and jazz musician Miles Davis as models and was Warhol's final public appearance before his death later that month. In 1990, Liu coordinated fashion by designer Anni Kuan and performance by Hong Kong singer Maria Cordero.

Liu was commissioned by the New York nightclub Mars to design a four-story nightclub in Bangkok, Thailand, which opened in 1990.

In 1996, Liu co-authored Unseen Warhol with John O'Connor, the former advertising art director of Interview magazine. Published by Rizzoli, the book combines reproductions of Warhol's lesser-known works with interviews of former Factory members and previously unpublished photographs, offering a behind-the-scenes portrait of the artist. To mark its publication, Barneys New York transformed its third and fourth floors into a recreation of the Factory for the book launch. The event featured music from Studio 54 and previously unseen footage of Grace Jones, Jerry Hall, William S. Burroughs, and others.

=== Later life ===
In 2014, Liu participated in a public program at the Andy Warhol Museum in Pittsburgh, where he discussed Warhol's Time Capsules and provided firsthand commentary on objects from the artist's estate.

In 2022, Liu appeared in the Netflix docuseries The Andy Warhol Diaries.

== Sources ==
- Hackett, Pat, ed. (1989). The Andy Warhol Diaries. New York: Warner. ISBN 9781455561452.
