= Oxidations (Warhol) =

Series of abstract works

Oxidation
- Oxidation Painting, 1978
- Artist: Andy Warhol
- Year: 1977–78
- Medium: Copper metallic pigment and urine on canvas
- Movement: Abstract expressionism

Oxidations is a series of paintings created by American artist Andy Warhol between 1977 and 1978. The works, also known as "Piss" paintings, were produced by applying urine to canvases prepared with metallic paint, causing a chemical reaction that generated oxidized stains and iridescent textures. The Oxidation paintings are considered among Warhol's most radical late works and are frequently grouped with his other abstract series, including Shadows (1978–79) and the Rorschach (1984).

== Background ==
In 1977, Pop artist Andy Warhol revisited abstraction after years of producing Pop imagery and silkscreen portraits. The Oxidation paintings emerged during a period in which Warhol was seeking to expand his artistic practice and reach new sectors of the contemporary art market. During these years, he developed two abstract series, the Oxidations (1977–78) and the Shadows (1978–79), which marked a significant departure from his celebrity portraits. Art critic David Bourdon described the two bodies of work as complementary: "One series revealed his Rumpelstiltskin desire to recycle waste into precious metal, the other displayed his devotion to elusive and even ineffable images."

== Production ==
The paintings were created at Warhol's New York studio, the Factory, with assistance from collaborators, including Ronnie Cutrone and Victor Hugo. From 1977 to 1978, Warhol and Cutrone—occasionally joined by guests at Factory lunches—acted as "living paint brushes." Large canvases were spread across the studio floor and coated with copper-based paint; while the surfaces remained wet, Warhol and his collaborators urinated onto them. The uric acid reacted chemically with the copper sulfate in the paint, producing oxidized green patinas and abstract stains across the canvases.

According to later accounts, the oxidation process continued to evolve during the first several years after the works were completed. By November 1986, when many of the paintings were exhibited at the Gagosian Gallery in New York, the surfaces were generally believed to have stabilized. However, art conservators and scientists have noted that the works continue to undergo chemical evolution decades after their creation.

== Technique ==
The paintings were typically executed on unstretched linen or canvas laid flat on the studio floor. Warhol and his assistants mixed metallic powders with water and an acrylic binder to create copper surfaces. A second type of ''Piss painting'' had a gessoed white surface rather than the copper-painted backgrounds. Warhol also experimented with paper in addition to canvas. Urine was then applied onto the wet paint, producing oxidation through chemical reaction.

The resulting surfaces were drips and blotches of oxidized pigment in green, brown, charcoal, and gold tones. Because the oxidation process depended on humidity, temperature, and the chemical composition of the urine, each work developed differently. Warhol frequently cut up larger canvases to isolate sections he found visually appealing.

Cutrone took vitamin B supplements to alter the chemical composition and coloration of the oxidized surfaces. In a June 28, 1977 diary entry, Warhol said: "I haven't peed on any canvases this week. This is for the Piss paintings. I told Ronnie not to pee when he gets up in the morning to try to hold it until he gets to the office, because he takes lots of vitamin B so the canvas turns a really pretty color when it's his piss." Cutrone later recalled that he and Warhol "invited men in to stand on one end of the canvas and pee against the wall. It was like a urinal in a toilet. … There would be four or five guys peeing against the wall in the studio."

Warhol's business manager Fred Hughes suggested combining pairs of the paintings to make them appear "more interesting," leading Warhol to create several multi-panel or diptych compositions within the Oxidation series.

Warhol also used his oxidation technique for his 1982 portrait of Jean Michel-Basquiat.

== Influences ==
In a diary entry dated March 19, 1978, Warhol recalled a conversation with Surrealist artist Salvador Dalí: "He said my idea of piss-painting was old-fashioned because it'd been in the movie Teorema which (laughs) is true, it was. I knew that." Dalí's was referring to a scene in the film in which an artist urinates on a painting. Although Warhol had already produced an earlier group of "Piss paintings" in the 1960s, Pier Paolo Pasolini's film may have contributed to his decision to revive and expand the concept.

According to Bob Colacello, former editor of Warhol's Interview magazine, the Oxidations were partly influenced by New York gay clubs such as Plato's Retreat, the Anvil, and Toilet, venues associated with the city's 1970s sexual subculture. Colacello described these spaces as containing "tubs and troughs where naked men lay for other naked men to urinate on them," linking the paintings to the erotic and performative atmosphere of downtown Manhattan nightlife.

Ronnie Cutrone recalled that Warhol's use of gold-toned backgrounds in the paintings "came from the Russian icons," reflecting the influence of the painted devotional panels that lined St. John Chrysostom Byzantine Catholic Church in Pittsburgh, which Warhol attended throughout his youth.

== Interpretations ==
Art historian Joseph D. Ketner II argues that the "Piss" paintings, though abstract in appearance, are "very far from being non-objective" because Warhol used "forms or substances from the real world," including urine itself. Ketner interprets the works as a "veritable celebration" of Warhol's homosexuality and situates them within the gay liberation movement of the 1970s. He also contends that the paintings reflected Warhol's attempt to regain critical credibility through their embrace of chance, process, and experimentation, which aligned with contemporary developments in the New York art world. Ketner also notes the irony that Warhol chose to exhibit the series in Europe rather than New York, suggesting that the artist believed he was more likely to receive "unbiased—and favorable—reviews" there, a judgment Ketner concludes was "probably correct."

Art critic and Warhol biographer Blake Gopnik wrote that the paintings enabled Warhol to find "a middle way between the grand old figurative tradition, with its evocations of our human bodies, and the avant-garde traditions of abstraction and even of Dada."

== Exhibitions ==
In October 1978, the Oxidation painting debuted during the Foire Internationale d'Art Contemporain (FIAC) art fair at the Grand Palais in Paris.

In November 1986, the Oxidations were exhibited at the Larry Gagosian Gallery in New York.

In 2023, the Andy Warhol Museum in Pittsburgh organized Altered States, an exhibition focused on the ongoing conservation and scientific analysis of the series.

From May to June 2025, the exhibition Andy Warhol: Oxidation Paintings was presented at Skarstedt in Chelsea, Manhattan.

== Critical reception ==
Critics and scholars have frequently compared Warhol's Oxidations to the drip paintings of Jackson Pollock. The similarities are evident in their abstract compositions, vivid colors, and gestural linear forms. However, rather than directly emulating Pollock, Warhol appears to have approached the series as both a pastiche and a satire of Abstract expressionism.

Sebastian Smee of the Boston Globe observed that the paintings "are a fascinating and, if you ask me, an unexpectedly beautiful expression of what Harold Bloom called the anxiety of influence: a brilliantly laconic instance of what the English call 'taking the piss,' and at the same time a glowing, even gushing tribute."

Reviewing the exhibition Degrees of Abstraction at Boston's Museum of Fine Arts in 1995, Robert Taylor wrote for the Boston Globe: "Because its method has received so much publicity, Andy Warhol's notorious 'Oxidation' painting—made by urine on metallic pigment, creating an overall effect that resembles sumptuous Japanese brocades—may possibly be known for its intentionally subversive stance. Yet it recalls one of Kenneth Clark's essays, 'The Blot and the Diagram,' in which Clark speculates about the possible influence on the art of Leonardo of damp streaks and shadows upon Florentine walls."

== Collections ==
Works from the series are held in the collections of various institutions, including the Andy Warhol Museum in Pittsburg, the Museum of Fine Arts in Boston, and Museum Brandhorst in Munich.

== Conservation ==
The chemically reactive materials used in the series have posed significant conservation challenges. The Andy Warhol Museum launched a scientific conservation study in 2020 after changes appeared in one of the paintings following a temporary HVAC failure that altered humidity and temperature conditions in the gallery. Conservators observed dripping residue and renewed oxidation activity on the painting's surface.

Research conducted by conservator Rikke Foulke in collaboration with mineralogists from Carnegie Museum of Natural History in Pittsburgh and scientists from RJ Lee Group has involved recreating Warhol's original oxidation process using archival materials and documented Factory techniques. Scientists analyzed the paintings with electron microscopy and identified compounds including copper, sodium, potassium, chlorine, carbon, and oxygen. Researchers believe hygroscopic salts present in the urine may contribute to the paintings' continued instability by absorbing moisture from the air.

== Art market ==
In May 1999, Untitled (oxidation painting), measuring 10 × 8 in, a gift from Warhol to Tommy Passion, sold for $25,300 at Christie's in New York.

In May 2008, Oxidation Painting (1978), measuring 76 × 52 in, sold for $1.9 million at Christie's in New York.

In May 2018, the Baltimore Museum of Art sold Oxidation Paintings (1978), measuring 76 × 52 in, for $2.8 million at Sotheby's in New York.

In October 2018, Oxidation Painting (1977–78), measuring 40 × 30 in, sold for £446,750 at Christie's in London.

In November 2023, Oxidation (1977–78), six canvases each measuring 9 × 12 in, sold for $327,600 at Christie's in New York.

In May 2024, Oxidation (1977–78), measuring 15 ½ × 11 ½ in, sold for $113,400 at Christie's in New York.

In November 2025, Oxidation Painting (Diptych) (1978), each measuring 40 × 30 in, from the Edlis Neeson Collection sold for $1.7 million at Christie's in New York.

== See also ==
- Shadows
