= Torsos (Warhol) =

Silkscreen paintings by Andy Warhol

Torsos is a series of silkscreen paintings created by American artist Andy Warhol in 1977. The works depict cropped and fragmented views of predominantly male torsos, emphasizing the human anatomy while obscuring individual identities. Produced alongside Warhol's more explicit Sex Parts series, the paintings emerged from several photo sessions organized with the assistance of Victor Hugo.

Created during a period of increasing visibility for New York City's gay community and the broader sexual liberation movement of the 1970s, Torsos has been interpreted as one of Warhol's most direct explorations of homosexuality and male desire. Art historians have described the series as a celebration of gay sexuality and a significant departure from the commissioned portraiture that dominated much of his output during the decade. The project also marked an important transition in Warhol's practice, influencing the development of his later abstract Shadows series.

== Background ==
In the 1970s, Pop artist Andy Warhol had become increasingly occupied with commissioned society portraits, a lucrative enterprise that dominated much of his artistic output. According to his assistant Ronnie Cutrone, Warhol viewed these commissions as "work" and often distinguished them from the more experimental projects he pursued for himself. Warhol complained that portrait clients typically wanted to look "more like themselves" rather than allow him the creative freedom to produce something "more imaginative." As a result, many of his personal projects became an outlet for subjects and ideas that lay outside the expectations of patrons and the art market.

Warhol had previously explored homoerotic subject matter in the 1950s through a series of drawings depicting nude male figures. He returned to sexually explicit themes during the 1960s with films such as Blow Job (1964) and Blue Movie (1969), before revisiting them more directly in the Torsos (1977) and Sex Parts (1978) series of the late 1970s. Warhol's principal collaborator on Torsos was Victor Hugo, a lover of fashion designer Halston. Warhol admired Hugo's provocative artistic sensibility and willingness to challenge convention, describing him as someone who was "always making art everywhere."

The photographs used as source material for Torsos and the related Sex Parts series also influenced Warhol's subsequent Shadows paintings. The Torsos series was also produced simultaneously with Warhol's Oxidation paintings, reflecting his renewed engagement with sexual subject matter and the increasingly visible gay culture of 1970s New York. By photographing male nudes and transforming the images into paintings, Warhol pushed the boundaries of what was considered acceptable within contemporary art while illustrating the broader sexual revolution of the era. Warhol referred to the nude models as "landscapes," a euphemism for imagery rooted in the male body and erotic desire. Within this context, Torsos represented one of Warhol's most direct engagements with homosexuality as a subject of artistic expression.

== Production ==
On March 15, 1977, Andy Warhol recorded in his diary that he had begun photographing nude models for a new series of paintings: "Victor came down with a nude pose-er. I'm having boys come and model nude for photos for the new paintings I'm doing. But I shouldn't call them nudes. It should be something more artistic. Like 'Landscapes.' Landscapes." The series ultimately expanded to include 94 silkscreened canvases, more than 40 drawings, and two editions of prints, all derived from 1,664 Polaroid photographs and 47 rolls of film depicting nearly 50 models. The resulting works ranged from relatively conventional studies of the male and female body to more explicit depictions of genitalia and sexual acts.

Victor Hugo played a central role in assembling models for the project, relying heavily on his connections within New York's gay bathhouse scene. Ronnie Cutrone recalled that Hugo "would recruit people from the baths in those days. I was there for all the shootings but not for the recruiting." Photographer Christopher Makos recruited actor Bobby Houston for the series. In a diary entry dated June 7, 1977, Warhol noted: "Chris Makos brought down a 'landscape' but then Victor brought down two and he made me do his first. Chris's was from the Harvard Drama School."

The photo sessions took place primarily at Warhol's studio, the Factory, where models were encouraged to undress and pose freely before the camera. Cutrone described the atmosphere as largely improvised: "Andy was a very shy, coy voyeur. He was like, 'Oh, oh, oh, that's so great. Oh, what can it do? Oh, what a big one. Boy, I wonder how it would look stuck in there?'... And there would be guys sucking and fucking, and Andy would be taking pictures. Later they euphemized the series and called it the Torsos."

The photo sessions began to disrupt the daily operations of the Factory, which also served as the headquarters of Warhol's Interview magazine. Cutrone admitted that "there were times when, even in my opinion, things would go a little overboard" and that the shoots sometimes interfered with other projects, but Warhol insisted that the shoots were "work, not play, let alone sex." In June 1977, concerns about the increasingly explicit nature of the sessions led Warhol's manager Fred Hughes to prohibit such activities at the Factory, prompting many subsequent shoots to be relocated to Hugo's loft on Fifth Avenue where they became even more raunchier.

On July 2, 1977, Warhol recorded cruising the Village with Hugo: "We went into porno magazine stores for research materials for the 'landscapes' ... Victor had a 'big black number' coming over to his house that he wanted me to photograph as a 'landscape." Warhol photographed Hugo in a wide range of erotic activities with models that included "wrists bound in duct tape and all kinds of penetration." Hugo later claimed that Warhol was "jerkin' off in the bathroom in between taking the pictures," but did not touch the models and remained an observer rather than an active participant in the sessions. A small number of these photographs served as the basis for works later known as Sex Parts and Fellatio, including one image that was adapted into a silkscreen painting and several editioned prints.

== Description ==
Warhol photographed hundreds of images of nude models, often focusing on fragmented views of the body between the waist and upper thighs. Some of the models were female, but most were male. Although many of the photographs depicted explicit gay sexual activity, only a limited selection of relatively restrained images were adapted into the Torsos paintings and prints. The resulting works emphasize musculature, pubic hair, shadows, genitalia, and buttocks while obscuring the identity of the models through cropping and repetition. Ronnie Cutrone later explained that Warhol was drawn to the abstract visual qualities of the photographs, describing the series as "a way of cutting-up the body, and getting nice shapes and shadows again."

Unlike the bright, saturated colors associated with much of Warhol's earlier Pop art, the Torsos series is dominated by muted greys, greens, and earth tones. The works also mark a return to a more painterly approach, combining silkscreened imagery with thick applications of acrylic paint. Broad palette-knife strokes are layered across the canvases, creating textured surfaces that interact with the printed image and, according to critic J. L. Tidwell, produce the appearance of "stitches outlining the edge of each figure."

== Interpetations ==
Art historian Joseph D. Ketner II described the Torso and Sex Parts paintings as a "veritable celebration of [Warhol's] homosexuality." Although none of the Sex Parts paintings or prints were exhibited or sold during Warhol's lifetime, his assistant Ronnie Cutrone characterized the series as a deeply personal project, stating: "It was something that Andy needed to do.... I think Sex Parts was a final announcement or affirmation of his homosexuality."

Art critic and biographer Blake Gopnik, similarly interpreted Torsos as part of a broader shift in Warhol's work during the late 1970s, when he increasingly engaged with openly gay subject matter. According to Gopnik, Warhol was more deeply invested in the project than in almost any body of work he had undertaken since surviving the 1968 assassination attempt. Created amid growing visibility and cultural confidence within New York's gay community, the series reflected both Warhol's personal interests and the changing social climate of the era. Its production also coincided with the emergence of photographers such as Robert Mapplethorpe, whose exhibitions of explicit homoerotic imagery were challenging conventional distinctions between fine art and pornography.

Art historian Linda Nochlin argued that women occupy a marginal role within the series because "Andy's heart wasn't really in the female nude." She described the few works as "boyish or even androgynous torsos" and contended that the space between the models' thighs is emphasized in a manner that suggests "the absent penis: the missing piece that would make these females into boys, into true objects of desire." Although she considered the images "quite lovely," Nochlin concluded that "these figures hardly have any sexuality at all." By contrast, she viewed the more curvaceous female nudes more favorably, noting their resemblance to "some classical model rather than the modern anorexic ideal."

== Exhibitions ==
The first Torsos exhibition was organized by Ace Gallery owner Doug Chrismas and Italian art collector Attilio Codognato at the Palazzo delle Prigioni in Venice, where it was exhibited from September to October 1977. As preparations were underway for the opening on September 16, 1977, Warhol noted in his diary: "The flesh color was a little off on the walls but it looked all right anyway. They all started to work. The Italian workers had already started hanging the paintings. Doug's assistant, Hilary, told me the workers were surprised when they saw that my paintings were closeups of naked bodies and I guess they didn't think that was good art because they started to make jokes and compare the cocks with their own and they didn't do much work."

The Torsos series was exhibited by the Ace Gallery for a week at the Grand Palais in Paris in October 1977.

The Torsos series was included in the inaugural exhibition at the Ace Gallery in Vancouver, which opened in May 1978.

The series was next displayed at the Ace Gallery in Los Angeles. Warhol attended the preview opening on September 23, 1978, and recorded in his diary that "the show looked good—cocks, cunts, and assholes." Originally scheduled to run from September 24 to October 21, 1978, the exhibition was extended through November 11, 1978.

== Critical reception ==
Art Perry wrote for The Province: "The five-panel Male Torso, 1977, contains a vital brutality particular to Warhol. Years ago he produced a tabloid-like series of traffic accidents in bold tones of pink and orange; his present Torso series has equal strength. Slashes of thick acrylics bubble and squirm under the heavily diffused body image. The wide-legged stance and the seemingly truncated composition of the repeated torso have a frightening severity that both thrills and chills the viewer."

J. L. Tidwell of the Santa Barbara Independent described the series as a continuation of Warhol's "commercial art background with only a few noticeable variations. Warhol is using a literal subject, enlarging it, dehumanizing it, and repeating it." He nevertheless regarded the focus on the human torso as "a genuinely fine step in the direction of a more pleasing esthetic" and praised the paintings' return to a "more painterly technique, but more developed." Tidwell noted that Warhol's "signature luminous primary colors are totally omitted," with greys and greens dominating the series.

== In pop culture ==
Three posters for the Torsos exhibition at the Grand Palais, which feature male buttocks, appear on the wall of Leon James' apartment in the 1980 film American Gigolo.
