= Shadows (paintings) =

Series of paintings by Andy Warhol

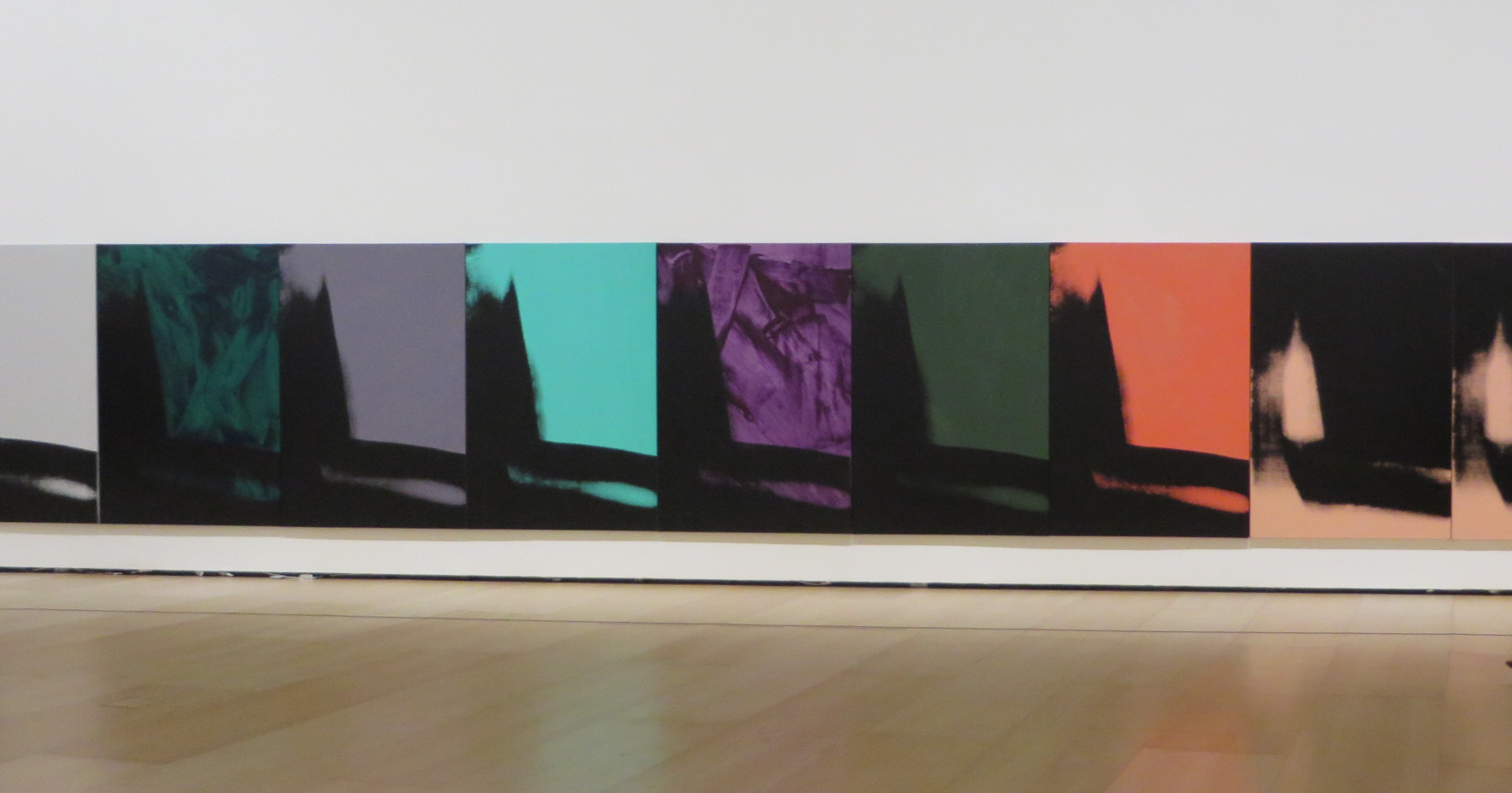
- Shadows at Guggenheim Museum Bilbao in 2016
- Artist: Andy Warhol
- Year: 1978–79
- Movement: Abstract Expressionism
- Dimensions: 193 cm × 132 cm (76 in × 52 in)

Shadows is a series of paintings by the American artist Andy Warhol executed between 1978 and 1979. It consists of 102 silkscreen paintings that represent distorted photographs of shadows. The works were first exhibited at art dealer Heiner Friedrich's gallery in New York City in 1979. They have since become a cornerstone of the Dia Art Foundation's collection.

== Background ==
Originally commissioned by Heiner Friedrich, co-founder of the Dia Art Foundation, Andy Warhol's Shadows emerged in the late 1970s as an extension of his exploration of abstraction following his Oxidations (1977–78) series.

The Shadows series was conceived in 1977, when Warhol turned his attention to photographing nude male models, which he called "landscapes," as source material for his Torsos (1977) and Sex Parts (1978) series. In a diary entry dated November 7, 1977, Warhol recorded having "family problems" after his partner Jed Johnson discovered the photographs at the Factory: "Jed came by the office and was in the back in my working area when he saw the stacks of Polaroids of all the 'landscapes' I photographed for the Shadow paintings—all the close-ups of cocks and things—he began screaming that I had degenerated so low to be spending my time that way and he left, really upset, and it ruined my afternoon."

Although rumors circulated that the Shadow paintings were derived from explicit imagery, Warhol's studio assistant Ronnie Cutrone later clarified that the final compositions were based on constructed forms and manipulated shadows, not bodily sources. Cutrone further explained the conceptual appeal of the series, "A Shadow is something, and it isn't," capturing Warhol's interest in ambiguity. Warhol had previously explored shadow imagery in series such as Skulls (1976) and Hammer and Sickle (1976–77).

== Production ==
The series comprises 102 silkscreened and hand-painted canvases derived from distorted photographs of shadows produced in the artist's studio. The images are based on two Polaroids taken by Warhol and his assistant after folding pieces of cardboard and lighting them to capture the cast shadows. The resulting paintings deliberately obscure their source, making "ambiguity and mystery…central to their very power."

In a December 1978 interview, Cutrone explained that Warhol was interested in "the abstract shapes of the shadows" and described the process in detail:

In the case of the Shadows I just got matte boards and pieces of cardboard…arranged them and tone them up and photograph them. And then, we get the photographs back, pick the photographs that we like the best, usually more than we're actually going to do so we have a choice. Then, they're matted…onto acetates or positives. Depending on what size we see the image as…if it's a print, the photograph will be blown up on acetate approximately…30 × 40…if it's a painting, larger. And then we just lay it down on white paper and see how it looks blown up…Then, in the case of a painting, it would be mopped out onto the canvas…Just the loose outline of the image, and, then, contrary to popular belief, it's painted first, not after the screen is put on…the photograph is always intact and it lays on top of the painting.

Each canvas features a dominant black form set against a variety of colors and hues, such as acra violet, cadmium yellow, cobalt blue, phthalo green, and silver. All canvases are identical in size (193 × 132 cm) and are installed side by side, extending approximately 450 feet (137 m).

== Exhibition ==
Shadows was presented at Heiner Friedrich, Inc. at 393 West Broadway in SoHo, Manhattan from January 27 to March 10, 1979. The opening reception was held on January 25, 1979, and Warhol recorded the occasion in his diary:

It turned out that out of the 400 people Bob invited, only 6 came. Six out of 400: Truman Capote, the Eberstadts, Fereydoun Hoveyda, who just resigned as ambassador, and the Gilmans. So 394 of our best friends were no-shows. No Halston—he was in Mustique. No Steve—he was, too. No Catherine. It turned out to be more of a punk opening, all the wonderful usual fantasy kids that go to openings like that. And René Ricard was there. Mrs. de Menil came, and she was sweet, and François, he was sweet. But Addie and Christophe de Menil didn't com. David Bourdon and Gregory Battcock, it was fun to see them, but we didn't get a chance to talk.

The exhibition consisted of 67 identically sized but differently colored Shadows paintings, installed edge to edge to form what amounted to a continuous mural encircling the gallery. During the run of the exhibition, Warhol distributed free copies of his Interview magazine outside the gallery on Saturdays.

For a year, the Shadows series was displayed at the Dia Center for the Arts' former Chelsea headquarters in 1998–99. Following the opening of the Dia Art Foundation's flagship museum, Dia Beacon in Beacon, New York, the Shadows series was presented as the museum's inaugural installation in 2003. All 102 paintings were exhibited at the Smithsonian's Hirshhorn Museum and Sculpture Garden in Washington, D.C. from September 2011 to January 2012, creating an immersive, wall-to-wall environment in the circular gallery.

The first complete European presentation of Shadows took place as part of the exhibition Warhol Unlimited at the Musée d'Art Moderne de la Ville de Paris from October 2015 to February 2016. In 2016, the works were presented at the Guggenheim Museum Bilbao in Bilbao, Spain. From October 2016 to January 2017, the series was on display at the Yuz Museum Shanghai in Shanghai, China. In 2017, the Cardi Gallery in London hosted the exhibition Andy Warhol: Shadows and Knives.

From October to December 2018, 48 of the 102 canvases were exhibited at Calvin Klein's headquarters as a prelude to the Whitney Museum of American Art's retrospective Andy Warhol—From A to B and Back Again. In December 2023, the series returned for a long-term view at Dia Beacon.

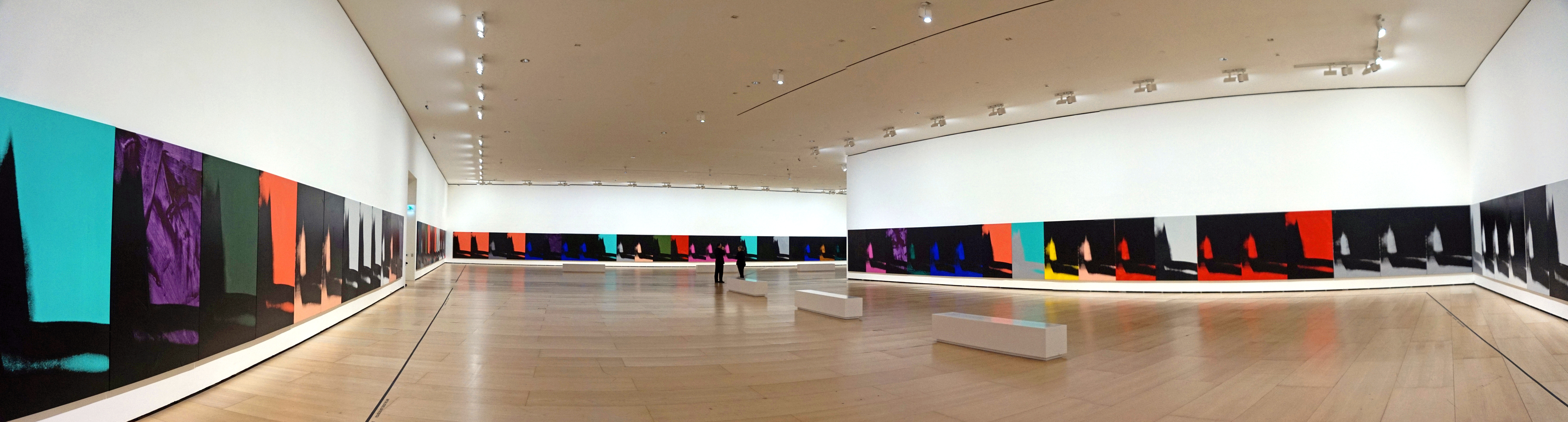
Shadows Guggenheim Museum Bilbao in Bilbao, Spain, 2016

== Critical reception ==
In a review, Thomas McGonigle wrote for Arts Magazine:

The eye does travel rapidly along the walls as if the paintings were a film strip or just wallpaper; Warhol still avoids being just a painter and we are rewarded on those Saturdays when he is there with a free magazine. However, if each painting is viewed separately, Warhol, the painter, appears. Some of the canvases have been done with a roller, for the surface is as smooth as a freshly painted wall. On others, the paint has been slopped on with a mop. (One would like to say "with emotion" but that is a no-no word these days.) We are struck by the almost infinite variety within even the tightest of schemas; yet Warhol has it both ways: he is a painter and he is not just another painter.
