= Dos Cabezas =

1982 painting by Jean-Michel Basquiat

- Artist: Jean-Michel Basquiat
- Year: 1982
- Medium: Acrylic and oilstick on canvas with wood supports
- Movement: Neo-expressionism
- Dimensions: 151.8 cm × 154 cm (59.75 in × 60.5 in)
- Location: Private collection

Dos Cabezas (Spanish: [ˈdos kaˈβesas]; transl. "Two Heads") is a 1982 painting by American artist Jean-Michel Basquiat. The double portrait resulted from Basquiat's first formal meeting with his idol, Pop artist Andy Warhol.

== Background ==
In 1979, Jean-Michel Basquiat, then a street artist working under the moniker SAMO, approached Pop artist Andy Warhol, who was dining with curator Henry Geldzahler at a SoHo restaurant, and sold him a postcard. According to Warhol's studio assistant Ronnie Cutrone, Basquiat attempted to visit Warhol's studio, the Factory, but was denied entry. In 1982, Basquiat told Art in America: "I was also selling handmade postcards, and handpainted Abstract Expressionist sweatshirts, to make money. I even went to Interview magazine and bugged Andy Warhol, you know, to find out how to get closer to it." Warhol purchased a few of the sweatshirts. "I just wanted to meet him, he was an art hero of mine," Basquiat later recalled.

Gallerist Bruno Bischofberger became Basquiat's art dealer and organized a one-man show in his Zurich gallery in September 1982. Bischofberger, who also represented Warhol, arranged a lunch meeting between the two artists on October 4, 1982. Warhol documented the meeting in a diary entry, which was posthumously published in The Andy Warhol Diaries (1989):

Down to meet Bruno Bischofberger (cab $7.50). He brought Jean-Michel Basquiat with him. He's the kid who used the name "Samo" when he used to sit on the sidewalk in Greenwich Village and paint T-shirts, and I'd give him $10 here and there…He was just one of those kids who drove me crazy. He's black but some people say he's Puerto Rican so I don't know. And then Bruno discovered him and now he’s on Easy Street. He's got a great loft on Christie Street. He was a middle-class Brooklyn kid—I mean, he went to college and things—and he was trying to be like that, painting in the Greenwich Village. And so had lunch for them and then I took a Polaroid and he went home and within two hours a painting was back, still wet, of him and me together. And I mean, just getting to Christie Street must have taken an hour. He told me his assistant painted it.

Warhol subsequently used a Polaroid he took of Basquiat the day of their lunch meeting to create the silkscreen portrait Jean-Michel Basquiat (1982) using his ''piss painting'' technique.

== Description ==
The painting Dos Cabezas, meaning "two heads" in Spanish, is based on the self-portrait Warhol took with Basquiat. The artwork ignited a friendship between them which led to a collaboration on numerous paintings between 1983 and 1985.

== Exhibitions ==
Dos Cabezas has been exhibited at the following art institutions:

- Jean-Michel Basquiat at Whitney Museum of American Art in New York, October 1992–February 1993; The Menil Collection in Houston, March–May 1993; Des Moines Art Center in Iowa, May–August 1993; Montgomery Museum of Fine Arts in Alabama, November 1993–January 1994.
- Basquiat at the Brooklyn Museum in New York, March–June 2005; Museum of Contemporary Art, Los Angeles, July–October 2005; Museum of Fine Arts, Houston, November 2005–February 2006.
- Basquiat: Boom for Real at the Barbican in London, September 2017–January 2018.
- Jean-Michel Basquiat at the Brant Foundation Study Center in the East Village, March–May 2019.

== Art market ==
In November 2010, Dos Cabezas sold for $7 million at Christie's in New York.

== See also ==
- List of paintings by Jean-Michel Basquiat
- 1982 in art
