= Self-Portraits (1986 Warhol series) =

1986 series by Andy Warhol

Self-Portrait
- Artist: Andy Warhol
- Year: 1986
- Type: Acrylic and silkscreen on canvas
- Dimensions: 203.2 cm × 203.2 cm (80.0 in × 80.0 in)
- Location: Metropolitan Museum of Art, New York

Self-Portraits is a series of silkscreen paintings created by American artist Andy Warhol in 1986. The series is known for Warhol's distinctive "fright wig" and incorporates his contemporary camouflage motif, but it also exists in monochrome versions against a black background. The paintings were first exhibited at the Anthony d'Offay Gallery in London in 1986.

== Background ==
Pop artist Andy Warhol produced self-portraits throughout his career, notably his series Self-Portraits (1963–64) and Self-Portraits (1966–67). The 1986 series was the last rendition before his death in February 1987. For the photographs on which the paintings were based, Warhol experimented with several wigs purchased from the Italian fashion retailer Fiorucci, although he felt they "looked like too much of a big-hat wig."

Warhol initially had Factory assistant Sam Bolton photograph him on February 22, 1986, but the results were unsatisfactory. He then asked Benjamin Liu to photograph him in the stairwell outside the Factory, where a series of Polaroid snapshots produced the images used for the paintings.

On May 5, 1986, Warhol recorded in his diary that London art dealer Anthony d'Offay had decided he "loves the Self-Portraits" after initially seeming reluctant to exhibit them. He said, "They acted so unsure before that I didn't think they were going to take them, so when Keith saw them and wanted to use them on T-shirts for his Pop Shop I said sure, and I think they've made up 200 of them, so now I guess we have to buy them all back." A few weeks later, on May 21, 1986, Warhol said that d'Offay had changed his mind, noting that the dealer disliked the new self-portraits and preferred earlier versions, particularly objecting to the hairstyle where his hair is "up like Jean Michel's."

== Description ==
Warhol based the series on two Polaroid photographs of himself wearing a black turtleneck against a dark backdrop, creating the illusion of his head emerging from a black void. The photograph Warhol chose was "more macabre" than the "slightly milder" one that d'Offay selected. He then transferred the images to canvas using his silkscreen process.

The compositions vary in size, the biggest being 9-foot square, and present a solemn Warhol staring directly at the viewer with a mask-like appearance, wearing his distinctive "fright wig." In the camouflage versions, Warhol first covered the canvas with a camouflage pattern in muted shades of yellow, blue, green, dark gray, red, and pink before printing the photographic image in glossy black ink, producing extensive areas of shadow across the face and wig. Other versions depict rich monochrome colors contrasted against a black background.

== Exhibitions ==
The series debuted at the Anthony d'Offay Gallery in London from July to August 1986. The exhibition also included portraits of Warhol's friend, German artist Joseph Beuys, who died earlier that year. Warhol attended the exhibition's opening in London on July 13, 1986, and recalled in The Andy Warhol Diaries:

The show. I mean, walking into a room full of the worst pictures you've ever seen of yourself, what can you say, what can you do? But they're not the ones I picked. D'Offay "art-directed" the whole show he'd tell me he wanted a certain picture, and then I'd think he'd never remember. so I'd do the one I liked instead, and when he'd come back to New York he'd say that that wasn't the one he'd picked. And he didn't want the big camouflage, he wanted the little ones.

Despite their earlier disagreements over the selection, d'Offay later described the exhibition as a "great commercial and critical success." The paintings were offered at $40,000 each, and works from the series were immediately acquired by the Metropolitan Museum of Art and several other museums worldwide.

Paintings from the series have been included in retrospectives on Warhol's career.

== Interpretation ==
Camouflage pattern became a recurring motif in Warhol's final year, also appearing in his The Last Supper, Statues of Liberty, and Camouflage series. The motif has been interpreted as a metaphor for both his deceptive painting practices and the screen separating his private life from his public persona. It also creates a tension between the impersonal camouflage pattern, which suggests concealment and danger, and the portrait tradition, which typically establishes direct engagement with the viewer, here obscured by an illusory protective covering.

Museum curator Kynaston McShine of the Museum of Modern Art interpreted the camouflage Self-Portraits as extending Warhol's exploration of identity and concealment. He wrote that the camouflage pattern further obscures the artist and his personality, using brightly colored camouflage to mask rather than reveal the sitter. McShine argued that, unlike Warhol's earlier self-portraits, the 1986 paintings reflect "ravaged maturity," with the camouflage failing to conceal their underlying "sadness and poignancy."

Art historian Trevor Fairbrother observed, "Staring, and not smiling, he resembled an ancient oracle, for example the Roman tourist attraction called the Mouth of Truth (Bocca della Verità): that sculpture is a massive circular slab of marble adorned with a commanding face and pierced mouth."

== Critical reception ==
Waldemar Januszczak of the Guardian wrote: "White hair exploding around his head, cheeks sunken Slavicly Andy Warhol, famous Pop Artist of Czech descent, stares out at his audience through unblinking eyes. The face comes in different colours and in different sizes. But the underlying likeness remains frozen, its mouth a tight line, its stare unshakeable. Andy, you feel, knows something about you that you yourself don't know.

In a review for Arts Reviews, Marjorie Allthorpe-Guyton described Warhol as an "alchemist" who transformed celebrity culture into enduring icons while portraying himself in his Self-Portrait as "blackened head, a Caput Mortuum." She argued that the painting "sustains the myth by turning inside out the arch manipulator's whole oeuvre." Comparing Warhol to Orpheus, she concluded that the work represented "either a brilliant end or an auspicious new beginning."

== Collections ==
Paintings from the 1986 Self-Portrait series are held in the collections of several major museums. The Metropolitan Museum of Art owns a camouflage version that incorporates green and beige military colors. The Philadelphia Museum of Art in Philadelphia holds a version with pink and magenta camouflage against a black background. The National Gallery of Victoria in Melbourne has an example rendered in pink, yellow, orange, and blue camouflage. The Solomon R. Guggenheim Museum in New York owns a monochromatic green version, while the Tate in London has a monochromatic red portrait. A purple monochrome portrait is in the collection of the Louis Vuitton Foundation in Paris.

== Art market ==
The small 12-inch-square portraits have fetched up to $2.7 million at auction.

In May 2010, a 9-foot-square purple Self-Portrait owned by Tom Ford sold for $32.6 million at Sotheby's in New York.

In May 2011, a red Self-Portrait fetched $27.5 million at Christie's in New York.

In May 2014, a set of six small Self-Portraits sold at auction for $30 million at Sotheby's in New York.

In June 2014, a 80 x 80-inch pink Self-Portrait was purchased at Art Basel at the booth of the Skarstedt Gallery for around $34 million.

In November 2016, a 80 x 76 white Self-Portrait sold for $24.4 million at Sotheby's in New York.

In May 2022, a 80 x 80-inch green, blue, and yellow camouflage Self-Portrait sold for $18.7 million at Sotheby's in New York.

In November 2023, a 80 x 80-inch red, white, and blue camouflage Self-Portrait sold for $18.1 million at Sotheby's in New York.

== In pop culture ==
In the 1995 video for "Scream" by Michael Jackson and Janet Jackson, one of Warhol's self-portraits morphs into a splatter painting by Jackson Pollock.

The purchase and subsequent resale of Warhol's Self-Portrait (Fright Wig) is the subject of two books about the art market, I Bought Andy Warhol (2003) and I Sold Andy Warhol (Too Soon) (2009) by private art dealer Richard Polsky.

A monochrome red Self-Portrait was used for the cover of the 2004 book Warhol by Claudia Bauer.

Warhol's Self-Portrait was used for the promotional poster for the Netflix docuseries, The Andy Warhol Diaries, in 2022.
