= Jill Eisenstadt =

American writer

Jill Eisenstadt (born June 15, 1963) is an American novelist, screenwriter, teacher and freelance journalist.

== Biography ==
Eisenstadt was born in Queens, New York and attended Bennington College, graduating in 1985. She was considered part of the "Literary Brat Pack", whose members included Bret Easton Ellis, Jay McInerney, Donna Tartt, and Tama Janowitz. Like her contemporaries at Bennington, she sometimes wrote in a sparse minimalist style influenced by such writers as Raymond Carver and Joan Didion.

Her first novel, From Rockaway, published by Knopf in 1987, was submitted as her MFA thesis while at Columbia University. The book is a coming-of-age tale about four teenagers from Rockaway Beach in Queens. The protagonist, Alex, escapes the working-class milieux with a scholarship to the fictional Camden College (a stand-in for Bennington) while her three friends work menial jobs and live in the now, spending summers lifeguarding and winters doing odd jobs. Eventually the foursome reunites at a beachside party and comes to terms with their diverging lives. Publishers Weekly called it a "finely tuned first novel." From Rockaway was translated into six languages and optioned by film director Sydney Pollack. It was re-issued by Little, Brown & Co in 2017.

Eisenstadt followed with a second Knopf novel, Kiss Out, in 1991 and a third novel, Swell in 2017. While not a sequel, Swell is also set in Rockaway Beach and features several characters from her first novel. In addition to her longer works, Eisenstadt has contributed short stories, essays, articles, interviews, and book reviews to such publications as The New York Times, Vogue, Mademoiselle, Elle, The Boston Review, New York Magazine, BKYLN (where she was an editor), BOMB and Glamour and to the anthologies ALTARED: Essays About Modern Weddings (Anchor Books 2007), Queens Noir (Akashic Books, 2007) and The Best Sex Writing 2008.

She has collaborated with her writer/director sister Debra as a co-writer on the screenplay for the independent filmThe Limbo Room (2006) and as a producer on the film, Before the Sun Explodes. She has also written extensively about the frightening experience of losing her apartment in 1989 to a steam-pipe explosion that contaminated her possessions, including her manuscripts, with asbestos.

She is married to fellow novelist, Michael Drinkard. The couple have three daughters Jane, Lena, and Colette Drinkard.

== Selected works ==
- From Rockaway (1987) ISBN 0-394-55970-3, reissued 2017
- Kiss Out (1991) ISBN 0-394-58230-6
- Swell (2017) ISBN 978-0316316903
