= Jon Gould =

Film executive (1953–1986)

- Gould in 1982
- Born: Jon Jewell Gould; May 7, 1953; Amesbury, Massachusetts
- Died: September 17, 1986 (aged 33); Los Angeles, California
- Education: New England College
- Occupations: Studio executive; film producer
- Relatives: Nathaniel Currier (great-great uncle)

Jon Jewell Gould (born May 7, 1953 – September 17, 1986) was an American studio executive and producer. He held senior roles at Paramount Pictures, including director of marketing administration and vice president of corporate communications, before transitioning into film production.

Gould was also the companion of Pop artist Andy Warhol from 1981 to 1985. Following his death from AIDS in 1986, his collection of Warhol's works was exhibited at the Brattleboro Museum and Art Center in 2004.

== Early life and education ==
Jon Jewell Gould was born in Amesbury, Massachusetts, on May 7, 1953. He was born into a prominent Yankee family that has owned a 900-acre dairy farm and estate since the 1700s. Through his mother, Harriet H. Gould (née Woodsom), he was related to Nathaniel Currier of Currier and Ives fame.

He had a twin brother, Jay Gould, who worked with their father, Robert P. "Bud" Gould, in the Gould Insurance Company family business. He is now a restaurateur and investor.

Gould graduated from Amesbury High School in 1971. After graduating from New England College in 1975, he enrolled in the publishing program at Harvard University's Harvard Radcliffe Institute.

== Career ==
In 1977, Gould was hired by Straight Arrow Press as the East Coast sales manager for Rolling Stone and Outside magazine.

In 1978, Gould joined Paramount Pictures' Motion Picture Division as the director of marketing administration for the Marketing Group. In 1979, Gould became the executive assistant to Frank Mancuso, the executive vice president of distribution and marketing. When Mancuso was promoted to president of distribution, Gould remained his executive assistant. In 1980, Gould was appointed vice president of corporate communications for Paramount Pictures Corp. He specialized in marketing films such as The Warriors (1979), Urban Cowboy (1980), Raiders of the Lost Ark (1981), and Flashdance (1983). In 1983, he worked to get the Showtime network, owned by Paramount, the film rights to the Diana Ross concert in New York's Central Park.

In 1986, Paramount Pictures Corporation signed Gould to produce four films under his company, Jon Jay Gould Productions.

Gould assisted his friend, socialite Cornelia Guest, with writing her memoir The Debutante's Guide to Life (1986).

== Sexuality and relationship with Andy Warhol ==
In November 1980, Gould met artist Andy Warhol through a mutual friend, photographer Christopher Makos. Warhol was initially interested in Gould for professional reasons—hoping to secure advertising from Paramount Pictures in Interview—but soon began pursuing a romantic relationship in 1981, despite Gould insisting he was not gay. The two grew close, and Warhol created a silkscreen portrait of Gould that same year.

Gould's background—old-money roots, a Harvard education, and a Hollywood career—strongly appealed to Warhol, who documented his fascination by extensively photographing him. As former Interview editor Bob Colacello observed, it was "a résumé that Andy couldn't resist," adding that Gould, like Warhol's former boyfriend Jed Johnson, had a twin brother named Jay, which further intrigued him. Colacello later wrote that to "those of us who were working with Andy at the time, it was obvious that he was suppressing the hurt of losing Jed—'Oh, Bob, it's just one less problem,' he told me unconvincingly the night Jed left, Christmas Eve of 1980—by going completely gaga over Jon Gould."

Although Gould became Warhol's "romantic obsession," accounts indicate their relationship was not sexual. Gould told his close friend Katy Dobbs that his relationship with Warhol was "asexual." Designer Halston similarly downplayed their intimacy, remarking that "the most that ever happened in Montauk was while Jon was taking a shower, Andy probably looked at him and got, you know, some satisfaction." Christopher Makos, who spent weekends with them, was even more direct: "I just don't think that they ever did anything. That was what Andy was moaning and groaning about." Warhol even offered Makos a Jaeger-LeCoultre watch if he could get Gould to sleep with him. "He said, if you get me a boyfriend, I will get you the watch. So I got him the boyfriend, and I said, time to pay up. He said, well, nothing's happened yet," said Makos.

Another complicating factor in their relationship was that Gould remained closeted and didn't disclose his sexuality to his family. By 1983, he moved into Warhol's townhouse at 57 East 66th Street on the Upper East Side of Manhattan, where he had his own bedroom. Valuing his independence and privacy, particularly not wanting to receive mail at Warhol's home, Gould purchased an apartment with Warhol's assistance at the Hotel des Artistes on the Upper West Side. While visiting his brother at Warhol's townhouse, Jay Gould asked him about the nature of their relationship. "He said there was no sexual contact, that they were just good friends," Gould recalled. "Jon described Andy as a 'voyeur,' which I guess he was. Yet Jon clearly liked Andy a lot," he added.

Although Warhol was initially resistant to Gould seeing other people, he eventually accepted it after Gould expressed his needs. Despite this, Warhol was despondent for weeks after learning from his friend Victor Hugo that Gould had been seen at the gay baths in 1983, during a time of growing concern around AIDS.

In February 1984, Warhol took Gould to New York Hospital, where he was treated for pneumonia and remained for eighteen days, followed by a brief readmission. He was treated by Dr. Denton Cox, Warhol's longtime physician and confidant. Warhol visited him nightly and was introduced simply as a friend. During this period, Gould expressed interest in seeking treatment in California, though it remains unclear whether his illness had yet been identified as AIDS-related or how much Warhol knew at the time. However, following Gould's discharge from the hospital in March 1984, Warhol instructed his housekeepers to wash Gould's clothes separately from his own.

The illness initially brought them closer—Gould invited Warhol to spend Easter with his family in New Hampshire—but their relationship soon grew strained as Gould took frequent long trips to Los Angeles. Despite Warhol's efforts to mirror Gould's lifestyle changes, the increasing distance between them became apparent by late 1984. That December, Bob Colacello ran into Gould at E.A.T., a gourmet shop on Madison Avenue, where he appeared healthy and was buying dried fruits. Gould said he was considering moving to the West Coast following his friend Frank Mancuso's appointment as president at Paramount. Allegedly, Gould was dating Mancuso's daughter and telling friends he wanted to start a family.

In an effort to keep Gould close, Warhol gave him the cover story on Shirley MacLaine in the March 1985 issue of Interview. That year, Gould was also the subject of a portrait by Warhol's collaborator Jean-Michel Basquiat. By March 1985, however, Gould had purchased a home in Beverly Hills formerly owned by Joan Hackett and did not give Warhol a key. He soon sold his Manhattan apartment and relocated to California, gradually distancing himself. During a visit to New York over Labor Day weekend in September 1985, Gould remarked to a friend that it was the first time he was not staying with Warhol—effectively signaling the end of their relationship. Warhol later noted in his diary in December 1985 that they were no longer on speaking terms.

== Death ==
Gould died of AIDS-related pneumonia at the age of 33 at Cedar Sinai Medical Center in Los Angeles on September 17, 1986. At the time of his death, Gould was reportedly "down to seventy pounds and he was blind," while continuing to deny even to close friends that he had AIDS. He was survived by his parents, twin brother Jay Gould, and sister Dale Gould.

A memorial service was held for Gould at the Main Street Congregational Church in Amesbury, Massachusetts on September 21, 1986. He is buried at Bartlett Cemetery in Amesbury.

== Legacy ==
In September 2004, the exhibition "Andy Warhol: The Jon Gould Collection" was mounted at the Brattleboro Museum and Art Center in Brattleboro, Vermont. The show consisted of 45 paintings and drawings, 20 prints, and 50 photographs taken by Warhol. It also included works by artists Jean-Michel Basquiat, Robert Rauschenberg, Marc Chagall, and Keith Haring.

In January 2018, Gould's alma mater New England College announced the "Jon Gould '75 Legacy Challenge." Alumni Jay Gould and Lex Scourby pledged a combined $1 million toward the construction of the Rosamond Page Putnam Center for the Performing Arts. Jay Gould contributed $500,000 in memory of his brother, and the building's lobby was named in Jon Gould's honor.

Gould's relationship with Warhol was explored in the Netflix documentary series The Andy Warhol Diaries (2022).
