= Brat Pack (literary) =

1980s group of young American authors

The Literary Brat Pack were a group of young American authors, including Bret Easton Ellis, Tama Janowitz, Jay McInerney and Jill Eisenstadt, who emerged on the East Coast of the United States in the 1980s. It is a twist on the same label that had previously been applied to a group of young American actors who frequently appeared together in teen-oriented coming-of-age films earlier that decade.

The earliest published use of this term to refer to writers from that generation was in an article by Bruce Bawer that was entitled "The Literary Brat Pack", that appeared in the Spring 1987 issue of the short-lived West Coast magazine Arrival and was included in his 1988 book Diminishing Fictions. Bawer devoted special attention to the writers Meg Wolitzer, David Leavitt, Peter Cameron, Susan Minot, and Elizabeth Tallent, and contrasted the often great critical acclaim they had garnered with their "decidedly modest accomplishments". Shortly thereafter, an article in the New York newspaper Village Voice presented the authors as the new faces of literature. Intended pejoratively, the nickname was illustrated by an image that collaged the authors' faces onto the bodies of infants. Yet their impact on literature and their vast popularity rendered this nickname an affectionate branding of the new wave of young minimalist authors. Each employs a stylistic or thematic gimmick: McInerney's debut novel, Bright Lights, Big City, was told entirely in second-person singular. Janowitz's Slaves of New York explored themes of sexual politics against a backdrop of New York's peculiarities rendered honestly, and Ellis's Less than Zero chronicled a post-adolescent disconnect with society that seemed shocking and pathological.

In the September/October 2005 issue of Pages magazine, the literary Brat Pack was identified as Bret Easton Ellis, Tama Janowitz, Jay McInerney, and Mark Lindquist. McInerney and Janowitz were based in New York City. Others affiliated with this group include Susan Minot, Donna Tartt, Peter Farrelly, and David Leavitt. Lindquist lived in Venice, California, and Ellis moved from Sherman Oaks (in Los Angeles) to Manhattan after the success of Less than Zero.

Spy magazine produced a booklet in the style of CliffsNotes parodying the scene; in addition to the other authors, the book briefly mentions Michael Chabon and David Foster Wallace as young novelists who made their debut around the same time.

David Lipsky is not usually mentioned in connection with the Brat Pack, although he attended Bennington College at the same time as Bret Easton Ellis (later transferring to Brown University) and published his first book while still in his early twenties.

In an article titled "Where are They Now?", Pages magazine reported that the original four Brat Pack authors socialized, but did not have a lot in common other than that they were young, heavily promoted, and that their books were aggressively marketed to a youth audience.
