= Codognato =

Codognato is a surname. Notable people with the surname include:

- Attilio Codognato (1938–2023), Italian jeweler
- Sergio Codognato (1944–2024), Italian footballer and coach
