= Skulls (Warhol) =

Paintings by Andy Warhol

- Artist: Andy Warhol
- Year: 1976
- Medium: Acrylic and silkscreen ink on canvas
- Movement: Pop Art

Skulls is a series of paintings produced by American artist Andy Warhol in 1976. The works depict a human skull rendered through Warhol's signature silkscreen technique combined with vividly painted backgrounds. The series is widely interpreted as a meditation on mortality, continuing Warhol's recurring engagement with themes of death and impermanence.

== Background ==
The Skull paintings originated from a group of Polaroid photographs taken in the mid-1970s. Warhol acquired the skull used in the series at a Paris flea market. He later discussed the subject with his business manager Fred Hughes and studio assistant Ronnie Cutrone. Cutrone suggested that using a skull would be "like doing the portrait of everybody in the world," reflecting Warhol's simultaneous production of numerous commissioned portraits during the decade. In 1977, Warhol notably took self-portraits in which he posed with the skull resting on his shoulder. In these images, the hollow eye sockets of the skull contrast sharply with Warhol's own expression, creating an unsettling dialogue between life and death.

== Production ==
The Skull series combines photography, painting, and silkscreen printing. After the skull was photographed by Cutrone, Warhol selected images from contact sheets and enlarged them for use in the paintings. He applied expressive, freely painted backgrounds in bold, often contrasting colors before printing the skull image in black outline over the surface. Although the same silkscreen was used throughout the series, each composition differs in the placement of the skull and the shape and direction of its cast shadow.

The paintings retain visible brushwork, particularly in the colored backgrounds, creating a contrast between the mechanical appearance of the silkscreened image and the spontaneity of the painted surface. Warhol further emphasized this contrast by incorporating a dark shadow within or alongside a second, more brightly colored shadow, giving the repeated image a different visual character in each composition.

Despite common assumptions about Warhol's Factory studio practice, Cutrone emphasized that Warhol himself executed the paintings, while his assistants primarily contributed to preparatory stages. Warhol also created a portfolio of four screenprints in an edition of 50.

== Description ==
The Skull paintings depict an enlarged human skull, complete with jawbone and teeth, positioned against broad fields of vividly colored paint. The skulls are rendered primarily in black outline, while the surrounding grounds and shadows vary substantially from one composition to another. The color combinations include a pink skull against green, turquoise, and apricot; a beige skull casting black and scarlet shadows against an olive-green and peacock-blue ground; and a gentian-blue skull paired with a jonquil-yellow shadow against a black and gunmetal background.

The skull is generally centered or positioned prominently within the pictorial field, while its cast shadow introduces an additional, sometimes ambiguous form. In several works, the shadow resembles a fetus, creating a visual counterpoint to the skull itself. The combination of stark anatomical imagery, highly saturated colors, visible brushwork, and repeated photographic imagery gives the series a tension between the macabre and the decorative.

== Interpretation ==
The Skull series has frequently been interpreted within the tradition of memento mori, in which images of death serve as reminders of human mortality. Comparable motifs appear in the painting Young Man Holding a Skull (1626–1628) by Dutch artist Frans Hals. Curator Arthur K. Wheelock Jr. drew a parallel between Warhol's use of the skull and its appearance in 17th-century Dutch art, where skulls were commonly incorporated into still lifes as symbols of the transience of life and worldly pleasures. Wheelock observed that "the empty gaze of a skull assaults us all. This stark reminder of mortality has always haunted mankind, for death is omnipresent, appearing when one least expects it." In contrast to the Dutch still-life tradition, however, Warhol removes the skull from the "midst of luxurious displays of expensive silver and luscious fruit" and presents it as an isolated, monumental image. As Wheelock noted, Warhol's brightly colored skulls offer no accompanying "sensual world" to enjoy, leaving the viewer instead with a direct confrontation with mortality.

The subject also relates to Warhol's longstanding interest in death. Although the Skull paintings were produced after his near-fatal shooting by Valerie Solanas in 1968, death had been a recurring theme in his work since 129 Die in Jet! (1962), followed by works depicting Marilyn Monroe after her death, and his Death and Disaster series. Some scholars have nevertheless suggested that the shooting intensified Warhol's introspection and that Skull can be understood as reflecting a tension between his carefully constructed public persona and a more private awareness of mortality.

The bright colors of the Skull paintings contrast with their somber subject matter. Unlike some of Warhol's works, which present death within a moral or religious framework, the Skull series treats mortality more ambiguously. The skull functions both as a universal portrait and as a detached emblem of mortality, reflecting Warhol's persistent engagement with the subject of death. This ambiguity is reinforced by the skull's cast shadow, which in some works resembles a fetus, creating a visual association between death and the beginnings of life.

The renewed prominence of skull imagery in the 1970s has also been considered in relation to broader cultural anxieties of the period, including fears surrounding disease, nuclear conflict, and environmental catastrophe, as well as the emergence of punk culture. Within this context, Warhol's Skull paintings can be viewed both as part of the historical tradition of mortality imagery and as products of a period increasingly preoccupied with death, violence, and uncertainty

== Collections ==
A set of six Skulls, each measuring 15 × 19 in, is jointly owned by the National Galleries of Scotland and Tate.

Eight large Skull paintings are displayed in two rows covering an entire wall at the Andy Warhol Museum, while two monumental paintings, each measuring 11 by 12 feet, hang on the adjoining side walls.

== Art market ==
In February 2003, Six Skulls (1976), each measuring 15 × 19 in, sold for £1.2 million at Christie's in London.

In October 2008, Skulls, ten individual canvases, sold for $7.2 million at Sotheby's in London.

In June 2016, a turquoise Skull dated 1977, measuring 15 × 19 1/8 inches, sold for £842,500 at Christie's in London.

In May 2022, Skull (1976), a 72 × 80 inch painting depicting a blue skull, sold for $25.6 million at Christie's in New York.

== In pop culture ==
In 2020, The Skateroom collaborated with the Andy Warhol Foundation for the Visual Arts to produce a series of skateboard decks in five distinct colors featuring imagery from Warhol's Skulls.
