= Slaves of New York =

1989 film by James Ivory

- Poster for Slaves of New York
- Directed by: James Ivory
- Screenplay by: Tama Janowitz
- Based on: Slaves of New York by Tama Janowitz
- Produced by: Ismail Merchant; Gary Hendler
- Starring: Bernadette Peters; Chris Sarandon; Mary Beth Hurt; Madeleine Potter; Adam Coleman Howard; Nick Corri; Charles McCaughan; John Harkins; Mercedes Ruehl; Joe Leeway; Anna Katarina
- Cinematography: Tony Pierce-Roberts
- Edited by: Katherine Wenning
- Music by: Richard Robbins (score); Boy George (theme song: Girlfriend); Michael Butler & Johann Carlo; Neneh Cherry; Les Rita Mitsouko; Joe Leeway; Ambitious Lovers; Inner City; Iggy Pop; Maxi Priest
- Production company: Merchant Ivory Productions
- Distributed by: Tri-Star Pictures
- Release date: March 17, 1989 (USA)
- Running time: 124 minutes
- Country: United States
- Language: English
- Budget: $5.5 million
- Box office: $463,972

Slaves of New York is a 1989 American comedy-drama Merchant Ivory Productions film. Directed by James Ivory and produced by Ismail Merchant, it stars Bernadette Peters, Adam Coleman Howard, Chris Sarandon, Mary Beth Hurt, Mercedes Ruehl, Madeleine Potter, and Steve Buscemi.

Based on the short stories within Tama Janowitz's short story collection Slaves of New York, the film follows the lives of struggling artists in New York City during the mid-1980s.

== Plot ==
Eleanor is an aspiring hat designer who, along with a group of artists and models live in the "downtown" New York City art world. Eleanor lives with her younger boyfriend Stash, an unknown artist, who is unfaithful and treats Eleanor with careless indifference. Eleanor expresses her feelings for Stash when she tells him that she was once attracted to him because he was dangerous. She stays with him despite the crumbling relationship because she has nowhere else to live—she is, in effect, a "slave".

When a clothing designer, Wilfredo, discovers her hat designs and offers to use them in a fashion show, Eleanor gains the self-respect—and money—to leave Stash. There is an elaborate fashion show sequence.

While buying food for a celebratory party, she meets Jan and invites him to the party. After the party, Eleanor and her new friend talk, and then ride off into the morning sunrise.

== Cast ==
- Bernadette Peters as Eleanor
- Chris Sarandon as Victor Okrent
- Mary Beth Hurt as Ginger Booth
- Madeleine Potter as Daria
- Adam Coleman Howard as "Stash"
- Nick Corri as Marley
- Charles McCaughan as Sherman
- John Harkins as Chuck Dade Dolger
- Mercedes Ruehl as Samantha
- Joe Leeway as Jonny Jalouse
- Anna Katarina as Mooshka
- Bruce Peter Young as Mikell
- Mark Boone Junior as Mitch
- Michael Schoeffling as Jan
- Steve Buscemi as Wilfredo
- Stanley Tucci as Darryl

== Production ==
Tama Janowitz had written a script for Andy Warhol, based on the Eleanor and Stash stories in her 1986 collection of short stories, Slaves of New York. When Warhol died, Merchant Ivory bought that script. The real graffiti artist from New York City named Stash, who is a friend of Janowitz, was the influence for the name of her lead character and can be seen as an extra in many of the party scenes.

The fashion show in the film had costumes by designer Stephen Sprouse.

In discussing casting the role of Eleanor, James Ivory commented: "...but out of 100 girls, there was not a single one with Miss Peters's originality. We wanted someone unusual and different but also ingenuous and not too knowing".

Slaves of New York was shot on location in New York City, on the Lower East Side, a downtown gallery and a club. Shooting started on April 4, 1988, with a 10-week shooting schedule. There was a "modest" budget—$5 million—that meant there were no lengthy rehearsals. There was one read-through before shooting began.

There are several cameos in this film: for example, Producer Ismail Merchant, lyricist Betty Comden and Adam Green, son of her writing partner, Adolph Green, and Tony Award-winning actress Tammy Grimes appear in party scenes.

== Reception ==
Slaves of New York received mostly unfavorable reviews at the time of its release. Janet Maslin wrote that the film "...simply drifts from situation to situation" and is "never terribly involving". Roger Ebert, who gave the film a half-star rating, opened his review with the statement "I detest Slaves of New York so much that I distrust my own opinion".

According to Box Office Mojo, the film's domestic gross was $463,972. On Rotten Tomatoes, it holds a rating of 30% from 10 reviews.

Slaves of New York became a cult classic amongst the gay communities in the United States. It is notorious for a scene that features a drag act performing "Love Is Like an Itching in My Heart" by The Supremes while making their way down a street in full evening gowns.

== Music list ==
=== Performed on screen ===
- "Mother Dearest"
  Written and performed on screen by Joe Leeway
- "Say Hi to Your Guy"
  Written and performed on screen by Johann Carlo and Michael Butler

=== Soundtrack album selections ===
- "Some Guys Have All the Luck"
  Written by Jeff Fortgang
  Performed by Maxi Priest
- "Tumblin' Down"
  Written by Ziggy Marley and Tyrone Downie
  Performed by Ziggy Marley and the Melody Makers
- "Admit It"
  "Love Overlap"
  Written by Arto Lindsay and Peter Scherer
  Performed by Ambitious Lovers
- "Buffalo Stance"
  Written by Neneh Cherry, Cameron McVey, Phillip Ramacon and Jamie Morgan
  Performed by Neneh Cherry
- "Girlfriend"
  Written by Boy George, Vlad Naslas
  Performed by Boy George
- "Change Your Mind"
  Written by Camper Van Beethoven
  Performed by Camper Van Beethoven
- "Good Life"
  Written by Kevin Saunderson, Paris Grey and Ray Holman
  Performed by Inner City
- "Fall in Love with Me"
  Written by Iggy Pop, David Bowie, Hunt B. Sales and Tony Sales
  Performed by Iggy Pop
- "Tongue Dance"
  Written by Catherine Ringer and Frederic Chichin
  Performed by Les Rita Mitsouko

=== Additional music ===
- "Warrior"
  (from 9 1989)
  Written by Allan Dias, Lu Edmonds, John Lydon, John McGeoch and Bruce Smith
  Performed by Public Image Ltd
- "Am I Blue?"
  Written by Grant Clarke and Harry Akst
  Performed by Billie Holiday
- "Dad, I’m In Jail"
  (from What Up, Dog? 1988)
  Written by David Was and Don Was
  Performed by Was (Not Was)
- "The Grand Tour"
  (from The Grand Tour 1974)
  Written by Carmol Taylor, George Richey and Norris Wilson
  Performed by George Jones
- "Glück, das mir Verblieb"
  From Die tote Stadt by Erich Wolfgang Korngold
  Performed by Carol Neblett
- "Love Is Like an Itching in My Heart"
  (from The Supremes A' Go-Go 1966)
  Written by Brian Holland, Lamont Dozier and Eddie Holland
  Performed by The Supremes
- "I Need a Man"
  (from Savage 1987)
  Written by Annie Lennox and Dave Stewart
  Performed by the Eurythmics
- "O ruddier than the cherry"
  From Acis and Galatea by George Frideric Handel
  Performed by John Ostendorf

=== Uncredited ===
- "Opening title" by Richard Robbins (loosely based on "I'll Be Your Baby Tonight" by Bob Dylan), sung by Bernadette Peters with chorus
- "Prélude" from Carmen by Georges Bizet
- "Hallelujah Chorus" from Messiah by George Frideric Handel
- "Kuroda-bushi" 黒田節
