= By the Shores of Gitchee Gumee =

1996 satirical novel by Tama Janowitz

- Author: Tama Janowitz
- Publisher: Crown
- Publication date: August 27, 1996
- ISBN: 978-0-517-70298-7

By the Shores of Gitchee Gumee (1996) is a satirical novel by Tama Janowitz about the Slivenowiczes, a trailer park trash family who are forced to leave their home in a polluted swamp area in upstate New York (as Maud claims on p. 194 of the hardcover version) and who beg, steal and borrow their way across the United States until they end up in Hollywood.

The first person narrator of the novel is 19-year-old Maud Slivenowicz, whose major source of knowledge is Reader's Digest. Her mother, Evangeline, has five children by five different deadbeat fathers. Without a regular income, the Slivenowicz family dream of becoming movie stars, and at the end of the book it seems one of Maud's brothers might actually be given a role in a television commercial.

The title of the book relates to a famous line in Henry Wadsworth Longfellow's epic poem The Song of Hiawatha.

By the Shores of Gitchee Gumee received reviews from Entertainment Weekly, Kirkus Reviews, and Publishers Weekly.

== Bibliography ==
- By the shores of Gitchee Gumee, Crown Publishers, 1996, ISBN 978-0-517-70298-7; Picador, 1998, ISBN 978-0-330-35406-6
