= Pat Hackett (writer) =

American author, screenwriter, and journalist

Pat Hackett is an American author, screenwriter, and journalist. Hackett was a close friend and collaborator of pop artist Andy Warhol. They co-authored the books POPism: The Warhol Sixties (1980) and Andy Warhol's Party Book (1988). She also edited The Andy Warhol Diaries (1989). Hackett was an editor for Interview magazine and she co-wrote the screenplay for the film Bad (1977).

== Career ==
Hackett received a Bachelor of Arts in English literature from Barnard College in Manhattan. While Hackett was an undergraduate student in September 1968, she went to artist Andy Warhol's Factory at 33 Union Square West to see if he needed a typist. Warhol was impressed that she could type and brought her on as a part-time volunteer to transcribe his tapes. Art critic Blake Gopnik noted in the biography Warhol (2020) that "over the next two decades she moved up to being his trusted confidante, collaborator and, especially, ghostwriter. Many famous Warholisms may in fact be Hackettian."

Hackett became close friends with Warhol's longtime partner Jed Johnson during her time at The Factory. Between studying and spending time at The Factory, she didn't have time for a job. By the spring of 1969, Hackett's finances were running low so she intended to quit volunteering at The Factory to find a part-time job, but Johnson notified Warhol and helped get her on the payroll which allowed her to continue working with Warhol.

After the Internal Revenue Service started auditing Warhol in 1972, he started dictating a daily diary to Hackett, who was his secretary, to keep a better account of his deductible expenses. At first, he would do this when he came into work every day, and later over the phone. This eventually grew into The Andy Warhol Diaries (1989), which spanned from 1976 to 1987.

In 1973, Hackett assisted director Paul Morrissey with the scripts for Flesh for Frankenstein (1973) and Blood for Dracula (1974), but she was not credited. Hackett co-wrote the screenplay for the last Warhol-produced film Bad (1977), which was directed by Jed Johnson. This was the first Warhol film to use a script.

Hackett's interviews with Warhol are the basis for the book The Philosophy of Andy Warhol (From A to B & Back Again) (1975). After Warhol died in 1987, Hackett co-authored Andy Warhol's Party Book. In 1989, The Andy Warhol Diaries was published, a transcribed, edited, and condensed version of a diary dictated by Warhol to Hackett in daily phone conversations.

Hackett appeared as a commentator in the documentary film Beautiful Darling: The Life and Times of Candy Darling, Andy Warhol Superstar (2010). In 2022, she appeared in the Netflix docuseries The Andy Warhol Diaries.
