= RJ Lee Group =

American company

RJ Lee Group, Inc.
- Type: Private
- Industry: Materials characterization, industrial forensics, software
- Founded: Monroeville, Pennsylvania, United States (1980)
- Founder: Richard J. Lee
- Headquarters: Monroeville, Pennsylvania
- Key people: Richard J. Lee (CEO) Casey Bunker (COO)
- Products: IntelliSEM; ParticleID; SEAMS
- Number of employees: 300
- Website: www.rjleegroup.com

RJ Lee Group, Inc. is a materials characterization laboratory and industrial forensics consulting firm employing more than 300 scientists, engineers, technicians, and support staff at locations in Pittsburgh, Pennsylvania, Monroeville, Pennsylvania, and Pasco, Washington. The company specializes in scientific support of four areas of interest: analytical laboratory testing, industrial forensics consultation and failure analysis, litigation support, and laboratory informatics. RJ Lee Group also offers software for criminal forensics and law enforcement agencies.

== History ==
In the early 1980s, several employees of the U.S. Steel Technical Center in Monroeville, Pennsylvania formed a company that developed techniques to assess air quality. The company, Energy Technology Consultants (ETC), rented time on the electron microscopes at the U.S. Steel facility and eventually developed a technique to identify specific air quality patterns. In 1985, Dr. Lee bought out one of the ETC founders and rented space for the company at the Bituminous Coal Research facility in Monroeville, Pennsylvania. In 1986, Dr. Lee formed RJ Lee Group, Inc., and within six months, the company accepted its first litigation project, which used transmission electron microscopy for the analysis of asbestos in the air.

In the late 1980s, the company developed a new technique for identifying, quantifying, and characterizing air particulate called computer-controlled scanning electron microscopy (CCSEM). Today, RJ Lee Group is a full-service industrial forensic laboratory and consulting firm with broad industry expertise. The company is also expanding into software development and is working on current environmental issues, such as those associated with nanotechnology.

== Scientific firsts ==
RJ Lee Group created the CCSEM (computer-controlled scanning electron microscopy) by combining a scanning electron microscope (SEM), x-ray analyzer (EDS) and intelligent software. In collaboration with Iowa State University, RJ Lee Group also developed the WebSEM that provides teachers and students in K-12 classrooms with the ability to conduct on-line investigations. RJ Lee Group invented a low energy method of pyrolysis of hydrocarbon material to be heated under vacuum conditions, using a clay and metal catalyst. RJ Lee Group in conjunction with Carnegie Mellon University and US Steel, with a grant from the US Department of Energy, developed an Automated Steel Cleanliness Analysis Tool (ASCAT). The tool was designed around a computer-controlled scanning electron microscope (CCSEM) which is capable of taking metal samples and analyzing up to several hundred inclusions in less than one hour.

== Notable work ==
RJ Lee Group actively consulted with and supported EPA Region 2 in evaluating air quality in Lower Manhattan buildings impacted by the events of 9/11. RJ Lee Group designed, implemented, and conducted sampling and laboratory analyses for building remediation while also conducting health, safety, and community air quality monitoring programs in and around the impacted areas.

The firm assessed damage and environmental controls after the 1989 Loma Prieta earthquake in San Francisco, California.

RJ Lee Group supported the EPA's investigation of potential emissions of tremolite asbestos from the Southdown Quarry in northwestern New Jersey. The firm provided air quality monitoring for the EPA related to the East Palestine, OH train derailment.
