= Stash (graffiti artist) =

American graffiti artist

- Born: Josh Franklin; 1967 (age 58–59); Long Island, New York
- Known for: Graffiti, Spray paint art
- Movement: Street art
- Website: mrstash.co

Josh Franklin (born 1967), known as Stash, is an American graffiti artist and graphic designer based in Brooklyn, New York.

== Biography ==
Franklin was born in Long Island, New York in 1967. He grew up in New York City, finding inspiration from a young age looking at illegal Graffiti art on the sides of the city's subway trains while on his way to school. Later in the early 1980s, Stash started painting trains alongside other artists such as Futura and ZEPHYR. He exhibited at age 17 with pop artists Keith Haring and Jean-Michel Basquiat, and later continued on as a successful gallery artist. He got the name Stash from the colloquial term "stashing", which equates to hiding things. Growing up in a very small home, Franklin felt the need to hide, or "stash" his most valued belongings from his brother.

In 1989, he appeared as a graffiti artist in the feature film Slaves of New York.

By the 1990s, Franklin began collaborating on product designs with high-profile brands such as Nike, Reebok, Casio, and more recently A Bathing Ape, Leica and Uniqlo. He still remains an active graphic designer to this day. Franklin also created two clothing brands and opened a sneaker shop: Subware, Recon, and Nort/Recon Sneaker shop.

== Exhibitions ==
- 2009: Celeritas, SURU Gallery, Hollywood, group
- 2011: Blue Brooklyn, Galerie Issue, Paris, solo
- 2012: Brooklyn – Berlin, Galleri Jonas Kleerup, Stockholm, group
- 2013: NW20 Exhibition, Bape Gallery, Kyoto, group
- 2014: SPRAYED IN FULL, The Seventh Letter Flagship and Gallery, Los Angeles, solo
