= Industrial forensics =

Industrial forensics is a holistic-based analytical and consultative response to problems encountered at any stage in the industrial manufacturing process. It differs from a traditional analytical approach that routinely identifies a problem and then reports the data in that its goal is to understand the problem, interpret the data and use those elements to prevent the problem from recurring. It is both prognostic and diagnostic. In its broadest sense, it is a holistic approach that examines each step in the product life cycle from initial R&D through final product and beyond to predict, identify, prevent and resolve manufacturing issues.

== Independent industrial forensics laboratory ==
A professional services laboratory that practices industrial forensics is an extension of the client's scientific organization. It identifies with the client's process and collaborates in the three areas that encompass all of the steps in the product life cycle: research and development (R&D), environmental health and safety (EH&S) and quality control (QA/QC). By examining each step in the manufacturing process in light of one or more of these areas, the laboratory obtains the data it needs to support the manufacturer's materials, processes and product before development, during the process and in the final product. The industrial forensic laboratory uses all available resources including bridging non-traditional expertise and technology and using standard approved methods as well as defining new procedures.

=== Research and development (R&D) ===
An industrial forensics laboratory works either as an R&D partner or an independent contractor selected for specific expertise. When working as an industrial partner, the laboratory becomes involved at the earliest stage of product development offering advice on raw materials selection and specifications. In the role of an outside expert, laboratory personnel and resources are made available to supplement the client's in-house capabilities. As an integral part of the R&D service provided, an industrial forensics laboratory is capable of determining root cause of failure at any step of the process in industries that range from nanotechnology to steel manufacturing.

=== Environmental health and safety (EH&S) ===
An industrial forensics laboratory assists industry in interpreting and applying government guidelines and regulations throughout the manufacturing process. The laboratory recommends measures needed to handle environmental concerns to both workers and product. The laboratory can also determine sources of pollutants during the manufacturing process that may affect the working environment and can design sampling and collection plans to monitor that process.

=== Quality assessment and quality control (QA/QC) ===
The industrial forensics laboratory works with the manufacturer to proactively address quality issues during the manufacturing process as well as post-production issues related to product recall, warranty claims or product liability. The laboratory has the resources to provide litigation support.
