= Matt Wrbican =

American archivist (1959–2019)

- Born: 1959
- Died: 2019 (aged 59–60)
- Education: Carnegie Mellon University
- Occupation: archivist
- Known for: authority on Andy Warhol

Matt Wrbican (1959–2019) was an American archivist and authority on the life of the artist Andy Warhol. He earned his BFA in Painting and MFA in Intermedia/Electronic Art from Carnegie Mellon University (CMU), where he studied with Bruce Breland. He began working with the Warhol Archive in 1991 in New York City and became Chief Archivist of The Andy Warhol Museum in Pittsburgh, Pennsylvania, United States. He managed the Archive and Warhol's Time Capsules for more than two decades at the Warhol Museum, where he unpacked, processed, preserved, and documented an estimated 500,000 objects. His last book is A is for Archive: Warhol's World from A to Z (Yale University Press, 2019). He also exhibited his artwork at the Pittsburgh Center for the Arts and Galleries. He died on Saturday, June 1, 2019, after a four-year battle with brain cancer.

== Blog ==
The Warhol: Blog. Author: Matt Wrbican

== Books ==
- Wrbican, Matt, Blake Gopnik, and Abigail Franzen-Sheehan. A Is for Archive. Warhol's World from a to Z. New Haven: Yale University Press, 2019.
- Alligood, Chad, Michael Jay McClure, and Matt Wrbican. Warhol's Nature, New York : Scala Arts Publishers, Inc., 2015.
- Wrbican, Matt, Andy Warhol, and Geralyn Huxley. Andy Warhol Treasures: [the Illustrated Story of Andy Warhol's Life and Work with Over 20 Facsimile Documents from His Personal Archive]. London: Goodman, 2011.
- Warhol, Andy, and Eva Meyer-Hermann. Andy Warhol: A Guide to 706 Items in 2 Hours 56 Minutes. Rotterdam: Nai Publishers, 2007.
- Wrbican, Matt. Andy Warhol's Time Capsules: A Guide to the Exhibition. Pittsburgh: Andy Warhol Museum, 2004.
