= The Andy Warhol Diaries (TV series) =

2022 American documentary television limited series

- Promotional poster
- Genre: Documentary
- Based on: The Andy Warhol Diaries by: Andy Warhol; Pat Hackett
- Written by: Andrew Rossi
- Directed by: Andrew Rossi
- Narrated by: Bill Irwin, using Resemble AI to simulate Andy Warhol's voice
- Opening theme: "Nature Boy" by Nat King Cole
- Composers: Brad Oberhofer; Oberhofer
- Country of origin: United States
- Original language: English
- No. of episodes: 6

Production
- Executive producers: Alexis Martin Woodall; Scott Robertson; Andrew Rossi; Stanley Buchthal; Stacey Reiss; Dan Braun; Josh Braun; Ryan Murphy
- Producer: Maya E. Rudolph
- Cinematography: Wolfgang Held; Maryse Alberti
- Editor: Steven Ross
- Running time: 53–78 minutes
- Production companies: Abstract; Dakota Group, Ltd; Submarine Deluxe

Original release
- Network: Netflix
- Release: March 9, 2022

The Andy Warhol Diaries is an American documentary television limited series from writer and director Andrew Rossi, and executive producer Ryan Murphy, based on the 1989 book of the same name by Andy Warhol, as edited by Pat Hackett. The series simulates the famed pop artist narrating his own diary entries through the use of artificial intelligence technology. Netflix debuted the series of six episodes on March 9, 2022.

The Andy Warhol Robot helped inspire the concept for the AI voice in the series, along with Warhol's cultivated image as an "asexual robot" at The Factory in the 1960s, and his claim that "Machines have less problems." Actor Bill Irwin provided the narration that was morphed by the AI software.

== Synopsis ==
Warhol began dictating diary entries via phone in 1976, taking stock of his life in great detail. Longtime friend and collaborator Pat Hackett maintained the diary for eleven years and reflects on the life of the artist. The series traces Warhol's relationships with interior designer Jed Johnson, Paramount Pictures executive Jon Gould, and artist Jean-Michel Basquiat.

Others interviewed for the series include Bob Colacello, Christopher Makos, Rob Lowe, Jerry Hall, Mariel Hemingway, Tony Shafrazi, Mary Boone, Vincent Fremont, Shelly Dunn Fremont, Jamie Wyeth, Glenn Ligon, Larry Gagosian, José Carlos Diaz, David LaChapelle, Wilfredo Rosado, Peter Wise, Donna De Salvo, Jay Johnson, Kenny Scharf, Alan Wanzenberg, Michael Chow, Patrick Moore, John Waters, Greg Tate, Julian Schnabel, Marc Balet, Lee Quiñones, Donald Warhola, Futura 2000, Daniela Morera, Debbie Harry, Paige Powell, John Reinhold, Gigi Williams, Jay Gould, Jeffrey Deitch, Jessica Beck, Cornelia Guest, Madelyn Kaye, Lisa Birnbach, Fab 5 Freddy, R. Couri Hay, Benjamin Liu, Lucy Sante, Tama Janowitz, Katy Dobbs, Whit Stillman, and Jane Holzer.

== Episodes ==
No.	Title	Directed by	Original release date
1	"Smoke Signals"	Andrew Rossi	March 9, 2022
Traces Warhol's path from Pittsburgh into the New York City art scene.
2	"Shadows: Andy & Jed"	Andrew Rossi	March 9, 2022
Warhol takes on the role of portrait painter for the illustrious. Meanwhile, his Studio 54 haunting and partaking disrupts his domestic life with his longtime boyfriend Jed Johnson.
3	"A Double Life: Andy & Jon"	Andrew Rossi	March 9, 2022
Warhol takes on modeling and early reality TV while he has a love affair with the closeted young Paramount Pictures executive Jon Gould.
4	"Collab: Andy & Basquiat"	Andrew Rossi	March 9, 2022
Focuses on Warhol's artistic collaborations and personal relationship with Jean-Michel Basquiat amidst New York City's booming 1980s graffiti art scene.
5	"15 Minutes"	Andrew Rossi	March 9, 2022
Warhol enters prime time via Saturday Night Live and The Love Boat as his friendship with Basquiat sours.
6	"Loving the Alien"	Andrew Rossi	March 9, 2022
As AIDS hits New York City, Warhol begins the Last Supper series and unexpectedly dies after its completion

== Critical reception ==
On Rotten Tomatoes, the series holds an approval rating of 96% based on 23 reviews, with an average rating of 8.2/10. The website's critics consensus reads, "Employing some risky stylistic flourishes that Andy Warhol himself might have approved of, these Diaries are a revelatory glimpse into the inner life of a purposefully unknowable artist." On Metacritic, the series has a weighted average score of 78 out of 100, based on 7 critics, indicating "generally favorable reviews".

Jack Seale of The Guardian described the series as "a startling biopic told with the artist's own words". Daniel D'Addario of Variety wrote that "the series both summons Warhol's affectless voice and insists on finding the intellect and emotion behind the coolly evaluating gaze".

=== Awards and nominations ===
Year	Award	Category	Nominee(s)	Result	Ref.
2022	Primetime Emmy Awards	Outstanding Documentary or Nonfiction Series	Ryan Murphy, Andrew Rossi, Josh Braun, Alexis Martin Woodall, Stanley Buchthal, Dan Braun, Stacey Reiss, and Maya E. Rudolph	Nominated	
2022	Primetime Emmy Awards	Outstanding Directing for a Documentary/Nonfiction Program	Andrew Rossi (for "Shadows: Andy & Jed")	Nominated	
2022	Primetime Emmy Awards	Outstanding Writing for a Nonfiction Programming	Andrew Rossi (for "Shadows: Andy & Jed")	Nominated	
2022	Primetime Emmy Awards	Outstanding Cinematography for a Nonfiction Program	Wolfgang Held (for "Collab: Andy & Basquiat")	Nominated	
2022	Gotham Independent Film Awards	Breakthrough Nonfiction Series	The Andy Warhol Diaries	Nominated	
2022	Hollywood Music in Media Awards	Original Song — Documentary Series - TV	Daniel Braun (for "So Afraid to Lose You")	Won	
