= Attilio Codognato =

Italian jeweler (1937–2023)

Attilio Codognato (January 5, 1938 – November 13, 2023) was an Italian Jeweler and art collector. His family has operated the jewelry shop Casa Codognato in Venice for more than a century. Codognato ran the business from 1958 until his death in 2023. For several years he operated an art gallery, the Galleria del Leone, in Venice.

== Biography ==
Attilio Codognato was born in Milan on January 5, 1938, son of Mario Codognato.

His great-grandfather Simeone Codognato established the jewelry shop Casa Codognato in 1866, near Piazza San Marco in Venice. In 1897, his grandfather Attilio Codognato took over the business. He quickly established a reputation for making unique memento mori pieces out of unusual combinations of precious metals and stones, including skulls and snakes. In 1928, he was succeeded by his son Mario Codognato.

Codognato's father died when he was 11 years old. He moved to Venice as a young adult. When he was 21, he met the jeweler Enzo Salvati, who became his mentor.

Codognato began operating the family business, Casa Codognato, in 1958. His clients included the Italian and Russian royal families and celebrities such as Maria Callas, Coco Chanel, and Elizabeth Taylor, which established Codognato as a symbol of ultra-exclusivity.

Codognato was an avid art collector. His collection included works by Andy Warhol, Lucio Fontana, Cy Twombly, Robert Rauschenberg, and Bruce Nauman. Codognato founded Galleria del Leone in Venice in 1962. In 1963, he organized an exhibition of Christo and Jeanne-Claude's work, featuring various objects. The gallery closed in 1972, and he began publishing prints in 1973. In 1977, Codognato and art dealer Doug Chrismas put together Warhol's Torsos exhibition at Palazzo delle Prigioni in Venice.

Attilio Codognato died following a period of ill health on November 13, 2023.

Since Attilio’s death in 2023, his son and daughter Mario and Cristina Codognato remain committed to continuing the family’s legacy as the fifth generation and maintaining the extraordinary quality of masterpieces made by Attilio and his family before him. The historic shop in Venice remains the single only authorised point of sale worldwide.
