= Tama Janowitz =

American novelist (born 1956)

- Born: United States
- Education: Barnard College (BA); Hollins College (MA); Columbia University School of the Arts (MFA)
- Occupation: Writer
- Writing career
- Genre: Fiction

Tama Janowitz is an American novelist and a short story writer. She is especially known for her novel-in-stories Slaves of New York (1986), which was adapted into the movie of the same name by Merchant Ivory in 1989. She is often referenced as one of the main "brat pack" authors, along with Bret Easton Ellis and Jay McInerney.

== Early life and education ==
Tama Janowitz' father was a literature professor at Cornell University, and her parents divorced when she was ten. She and her brother David grew up with her mother in Massachusetts, and, for two years in the late 1960s, in Israel.

Janowitz graduated from Barnard College with a B.A. in 1977 and from Hollins College with an M.A. in 1979.

In 1985 she received an M.F.A. from the Columbia University School of the Arts.

== Career ==
Upon settling in New York City, Janowitz started writing about life there, becoming well known in Manhattan literary and social circles. She began socializing with pop artist Andy Warhol through her relationship with artist Ronnie Cutrone.

Janowitz's collection of short stories, Slaves of New York, brought her wider fame in 1986. Publishers Weekly described the book as seven stories featuring a woman named Eleanor, "a diffident young woman who gains entree to the arty milieu of lower Manhattan, which seems to combine elements of Oz and Never-Never-Land with Dante's Inferno." Warhol mentioned in his diary that the characters Eleanor and Stash in the stories are based on Janowitz and Cutrone. The book was adapted into the 1989 film Slaves of New York, which was directed by James Ivory and starring Bernadette Peters. Janowitz wrote the screenplay and also appeared, playing Peters' friend.

Janowitz is often referenced as one of the main "brat pack" authors, along with Bret Easton Ellis and Jay McInerney.

Her memoir, Scream: A Memoir of Glamour and Dysfunction, was published in August 2016 to mixed reviews. In The New York Times Book Review, Ada Calhoun noted Janowitz's deadpan, almost careless way of looking at her own life and the glamour of hanging out with Andy Warhol and dancing at Studio 54. The review also addressed the concern with material goods and financial security that drives many of Janowitz's novels and led her to appear in ads for Amaretto and other products, writing that it "shows that she comes by her obsession with money honestly."

== Personal life ==
Janowitz left Manhattan to live in Brooklyn with her British husband and art-gallery owner, Tim Hunt (younger brother of 1976 Formula One World Champion James Hunt) and their daughter. In 2013 she was living near Ithaca, New York. The couple separated but did not divorce. Tim Hunt passed away Nov 26, 2017

== Awards ==
- 1975: Bread Loaf Writers fellowship
- 1976; 1977: Janoway Fiction prize
- 1982: National Endowment Award

== Publications ==
=== Fiction ===
- American Dad, Crown, 1981, ISBN 978-0-517-56573-5; Picador, 1988, ISBN 9780330302678
- Slaves of New York, Crown Publishers, 1986, ISBN 978-0-517-56107-2
- Five, (with Constance DeJong, Richard Prince, Joe Gibbons, and Leslie Thornton), New York: Top Stories, 1986, ISBN 978-0917061233
- A Cannibal in Manhattan, Washington Square Press, July 1988, ISBN 978-0-671-66598-2
- The Male Cross-Dresser Support Group, Crown Publishers, 1992, ISBN 978-0-517-58698-3; Simon and Schuster, 1994, ISBN 978-0-671-87150-5
- By the Shores of Gitchee Gumee Crown Publishers, 1996, ISBN 978-0-517-70298-7
- A Certain Age, Doubleday, 1999; Anchor Books, 2000, ISBN 978-0-385-49611-7
- Hear that?, Illustrator Tracy Dockray, SeaStar Books, 2001, ISBN 978-1-58717-074-4
- Peyton Amberg, Bloomsbury, 2003, ISBN 978-0-7475-6138-5; Macmillan, 2004, ISBN 978-0-312-31845-1
- They Is Us, The Friday Project Limited, 2008, ISBN 9781906321123
- I baffi di Anne, Cantoni Editore, 2025, ISBN 9791281927155

=== Nonfiction ===
- Janowitz, Tama (November 12, 2007). "The Real Thing". The New York Times.
- Area Code 212, Bloomsbury, 2002, ISBN 978-0-7475-5828-6; Macmillan, 2005, ISBN 978-0-312-32063-8
- Scream: A Memoir of Glamour and Dysfunction; Dey Street Books, August 9, 2016 (ISBN 978-0062391322)
