= Slaves of New York (short story collection) =

Collection of short stories by Tama Janowitz

Slaves of New York is a collection of short stories by Tama Janowitz. Its premise is that finding an apartment in Manhattan is so expensive and hard to do that people in the fringes of the art scene, both male and female, end up with undesirable partners simply to have a place to live. Several stories feature Eleanor, who lives with a psychologically abusive visual artist whose work is obviously derivative of cartoons. The title story was published in The New Yorker.

== Reception ==
The book was a hit and quickly became a best-seller. Janowitz became an overnight media sensation, appearing on the cover of New York Magazine, making guest appearances on MTV and Late Night with David Letterman, and being featured in an advertising campaign for Amaretto. However, according to Janowitz in her 2016 memoir, Scream, the book on its own did not earn her a significant amount of money.

== Film adaptation ==
In 1989, the book was adapted into a film version by Janowitz and the producer-director team of Merchant Ivory. The film starred Bernadette Peters as Eleanor and featured a small role for Janowitz herself.

== Bibliography ==
- Slaves of New York, Crown Publishers, 1986, ISBN 978-0-517-56107-2; Washington Square Press, 1987, ISBN 978-0-671-63678-4; Simon and Schuster, 1991, ISBN 978-0-671-74524-0
- Slaves of New York at IMDb
