= Victor Hugo (artist and window dresser) =

Venezuelan born American artist (1942–1993)

- Hugo by Andy Warhol in 1977
- Born: Victor Rojas; 1948; Caracas, Venezuela
- Died: 1994 (aged 45–46); Manhattan, New York City, New York, U.S.

Victor Hugo, born Victor Rojas, (1948–1994) was a Venezuelan-born American artist and window dresser. He was best known as the romantic partner of fashion designer Halston. Hugo created theatrical window displays for Halston's Madison Avenue boutique, where his serialized installations garnered attention for their dark humor and provocative themes. Hugo also worked as an assistant to Pop artist Andy Warhol, contributing to Warhol's series Torsos (1977) and Oxidations (1977–78).

In New York's fashion and art circles, Hugo had a reputation for his flamboyant personality and unconventional artistic sensibility. After his relationship with Halston ended, he became destitute and died of AIDS-related complications in 1994.

== Biography ==
=== Early life ===
Hugo was born at the time of a military coup d'état in Caracas, in 1948. He emigrated with his mother to New York City in the early 1970s.

=== Meeting Halston and window displays ===
Hugo met fashion designer Halston in 1972 after the two were introduced through a call service. The pair soon began a romantic relationship, and Hugo became the first of Halston's boyfriends to live with him. Although Halston initially employed Hugo in the company's packing department, it soon became apparent that he was better suited to creative work. By late 1973, Halston had Hugo redesign the display windows of the Halston boutique, replacing a Christmas window created by boutique manager Ed Austin after the designer expressed dissatisfaction with it. The incident marked the beginning of Hugo's role as Halston's principal window dresser.

Hugo was described by journalist Steven Gaines as "brilliant, zany, exciting, and dangerous." Reflecting his flamboyant public persona, Hugo told Interview magazine in April 1975: "Perhaps you would describe me as jaded, darling, but I prefer to say that in living there is absolutely nothing that is bad. I can only say that I live fully 24 hours a day—and I regret nothing."

In 1976, New York magazine profiled Hugo for his unconventional window displays at the Madison Avenue Halston boutique. Hugo was influenced by the Pop art of his friend Andy Warhol and said his windows reflect "the vulgar soap opera of our every day lives." One display depicted a pregnant mannequin in a hospital bed whose abdomen grew larger each day over the course of a week, culminating in the birth of a baby. Halston recalled that "some people thought it was bad taste and vulgar." Other windows featured scenes such as a woman tripping in high heels, King Kong attacking a luncheon party, and an explosion-inspired display based on the 1975 LaGuardia Airport bombing. The magazine described Hugo's work as resembling Grand Guignol, contrasting its macabre spectacle with the more conventional displays of other New York department stores.

Hugo was also Halston's "art adviser." Hugo was selling Warhol's artwork to Halston, which benefited Halston as well because it allowed Victor to earn money through commissions without "stretching the payroll of Halston Enterprises."

=== Friendship with Andy Warhol and Studio 54 years ===
Hugo later became one of Andy Warhol's studio assistants at the Factory, where Warhol photographed him nude and performing sexual acts with men for his Torsos (1977) and Sex Parts (1978) series. Hugo also worked on Warhol's Oxidations (1977–78), paintings made with urine.

When Studio 54 opened in 1977, Halston and Hugo immersed themselves in a hedonistic and partying lifestyle. Cocaine-infused orgies were held at Halston's Upper East Side townhome. Warhol noted in a July 1977 diary entry that Hugo had a girlfriend named Nancy whom he'd sleep with for cocaine.

In his memoir Holy Terror: Andy Warhol Close Up (1990), Bob Colacello, former executive editor at Interview, described how Warhol often used Hugo to antagonize Halston: "Andy loved it when Victor showed up at [Studio] 54 in a jockstrap or at a Halston party in a Halston dress, in both cases much to Halston's embarrassment...Victor later told me that Andy actually paid him to do these things". He further stated that "Andy saw Victor as the perfect source for ideas: someone with a fertile imagination who didn't know what to do with it...The Venezuelan's own art was going nowhere: He signed rat traps and handed them out at parties; he dipped chickens' feet in red paint and called their footprints drawings." In 1978, the artist and videographer Anton Perich made a short film of Hugo destroying a Warhol painting as "a sacrifice."

Hugo's friendship with Warhol caused a rift in Warhol's relationship with his longtime boyfriend Jed Johnson. "When Studio 54 opened, New York was at the height of its decadence, and things changed with Andy," Johnson told Warhol's biographer Victor Bockris. "I never liked that scene, and I felt that Andy was just wasting his time. It was really upsetting. He spent his time with the most ridiculous people."

=== End of relationship with Halston ===
By the late 1970s, Hugo had moved out of Halston's house and into a loft at 109 Fifth Avenue, where he lived with his assistant Benjamin Liu. His on-and-off relationship with Halston dissipated after more than a decade in the 1980s. Hugo's ever-increasing drug addiction and tempestuous nature were a contributing factor to the couple's breakup. By 1988, Halston had been diagnosed with HIV and relocated soon after to San Francisco to be closer to his family. Despite their relationship having ended, Halston still continued to pay for Hugo's housing and other expenses. Hugo reportedly stole Warhol's works and Elsa Peretti's belongings to feed his drug habit.

In 1989, Hugo had expressed dissatisfaction with how he was portrayed in The Andy Warhol Diaries and threatened to auction off any Warhol piece in his possession. He said, "I feel like the Central Park jogger…I've been gang-raped and beaten by a dead person and bunch of thugs that work for him. It is the most vile, disgusting piece of pulp literature I have ever read..."

Shortly before Halston's death in 1990, Halston's brother Bob Halston locked Hugo out of Halston's New York property after learning that Hugo had moved back in and was stealing Halston's personal property. A contract was drawn up requiring that Hugo would not contest Halston's will nor cause any embarrassment to the estate. Hugo had previously signed a non-disclosure agreement in 1985 to not speak publicly about his relationship with Halston in exchange for a large monetary sum, but he broke it.

=== Later life and death ===
In 1993, it was reported that Hugo was working on an autobiography, though the project never came to fruition. In his book The Last Party: Studio 54, Disco and the Culture of the Night (1997), Anthony Haden-Guest wrote how the artist Scott Covert encountered a homeless Hugo in December 1993, sleeping in a park after running out of money to stay at the Hotel Chelsea. Covert and fellow Hotel Chelsea resident Colleen Weinstein helped a cancer-stricken Hugo, such as taking him to his hospital visits. When Hugo died in 1994 from AIDS-related complications Covert and Weinstein did not have the funds to bury him, and it took them two weeks to save up enough money. They buried him on Halston's birthday at an East Hampton cemetery.

== Legacy ==
In September 2007, an exhibition of mannequins dressed by Hugo (from Warhol's collection) was held at the Milk Gallery in New York City.

In 2010, fashion historian Juliana Cairone cited Hugo as an inspiration when creating a display to showcase her Halston clothing for sale.

Hugo was featured in archive footage about his relationship with the designer in the 2019 documentary film Halston. Among the interviewees was Sassy Johnson, and she gave the following assessment about Halston's relationship with Hugo: "My theory has always been that Halston came from an alcoholic family, that his father had a problem...[and] that Halston recreated his family life with Victor as the dysfunctional person who is constantly going to keep everything off balance".

Actor Gian Franco Rodríguez portrayed Hugo in the 2021 Ryan Murphy produced Netflix television miniseries Halston. To prepare for the role, Rodriguez conducted extensive research that included consulting with one of Hugo's friends.
