= Wilfredo Rosado =

American jewelry designer

Wilfredo Rosado is an American jewelry designer and stylist. Early in his career, Rosado worked as a stylist at Andy Warhol's Interview magazine while also holding positions at Armani, later becoming Head of Public Relations for Emporio Armani before joining the design team. He subsequently established himself as a high jeweler, founding his eponymous high jewelry collection in 2011 and launching the fine jewelry line W. Rosado in 2020. Rosado has also notably worked as a stylist for singer Mariah Carey.

== Life and career ==
Rosado was born in New Jersey to Puerto Rican parents. He took an interest in fashion at a young age and would read international fashion magazines.

Rosado studied biology for two years at New York University. He wanted to become a doctor, but he had a passion for fashion. On weekends, he worked at a shop called Parachute in SoHo, Manhattan. While still in school, he was recruited in 1984 to work at the first Giorgio Armani boutique in New York City. After a summer of working at Armani, he intended to resume school in the fall, but he was drawn to the business of fashion and never returned. He went from doing sales to visual merchandising.

In 1984, Rosado met Pop artist Andy Warhol and was offered a job in Interview magazine's fashion department. He became part of Warhol's inner circle and was immersed in New York City's downtown art and club scene, where he also befriended artists Jean-Michel Basquiat and Keith Haring. In a diary entry dated December 19, 1985, Warhol said: "Wilfredo's really the best babysitter. He's sweet but he's street-smart. And he takes numbers and follows up on business contacts. But he's so busy with his styling work at Interview and he still works Saturdays at Armani." After Warhol died in 1987, Rosado remained at Interview for a short while before doing a stint at Fame magazine. Afterward, he returned to Armani as the head of PR for Emporio Armani, then he joined the design team and relocated to Milan for two years.

A shopping trip with Warhol in New York's Diamond District, where they browsed antique gems and estate jewelry, first sparked Rosado's interest in jewelry design in the 1980s. In 2011, Rosado launched his namesake high jewelry brand. Shortly after, actress Gwyneth Paltrow wore pink earrings by Wilfredo Rosado during her performance with singer CeeLo Green at the 53rd Annual Grammy Awards in 2011.

Rosado is also the longtime stylist of singer Mariah Carey. He styled Carey for her holiday specials Mariah Carey's Merriest Christmas (2015) and Mariah Carey: Merry Christmas to All! (2022), as well as for her Las Vegas residency, The Celebration of Mimi (2024–2025). In addition, he designed the 35-carat engagement ring Carey received from Australian businessman James Packer when they were engaged in 2016.

In 2020, he launched the fine jewelry line W. Rosado. He designed the pearl necklace worn by Vice President Kamala Harris at the Inauguration of Joe Biden in 2021.

Rosado appeared in the Netflix docuseries The Andy Warhol Diaries (2022).
