= The Andy Warhol Diaries =

Memoir published 1989

- Cover of the first edition
- Author: Andy Warhol
- Language: English
- Published: 1989
- Publisher: Warner Books
- Publication place: United States
- Pages: 807
- ISBN: 978-1455561452

The Andy Warhol Diaries is a posthumously published book that compiles the personal diary entries of American artist Andy Warhol, recorded between 1976 and shortly before his death in 1987. Dictated to his confidante and collaborator Pat Hackett, it was condensed into an 807-page book from the complete 20,000-page diary Hackett maintained. The book offers an intimate account of Warhol's daily life, social world, business dealings, and artistic concerns, providing a detailed portrait of his later years and his central role in the international art, fashion, and celebrity scenes of the late 20th century. Upon its release, The Andy Warhol Diaries was an immediate commercial success and became a New York Times Best Seller.

== Background ==
After Pop artist Andy Warhol was audited by the Internal Revenue Service in 1972, he started dictating a daily diary to his secretary Pat Hackett at The Factory to keep a better account of his deductible expenses. This eventually grew into The Andy Warhol Diaries.

Beginning in November 1976, Monday through Friday, Warhol and Hackett talked by phone each morning, and he narrated the events of the previous day. Weekend entries were done the following Monday in a longer session. If he were traveling, he would call her from wherever he was or tell her what occurred on the missed days when he returned. Hackett transcribed his monologue onto a legal pad. Later in the morning, she would type it on her typewriter, which turned into 20,000 double-spaced pages of unedited entries. After Warhol's death in February 1987, Hackett reduced the diary to 1,600 pages, remarking that much of the remaining 18,400 pages consisted of "drivel".

== Content ==
The diary opens on November 24, 1976, with Warhol in Vancouver at the conclusion of a trip to Seattle for the opening of the Seattle Art Museum. While on the West Coast, he noted that he attended the wedding of model Marisa Berenson and business tycoon Jim Randall in Los Angeles. Warhol then flew from Vancouver to LaGuardia Airport in East Elmhurst, Queens, with socialite Catherine Guinness and his business manager Fred Hughes, returning to his Manhattan home, where he shared an early Thanksgiving dinner with his live-in boyfriend Jed Johnson.

For the next eleven years, Warhol documented his personal and social life, along with his career and daily expenses. The book is filled with candid observations about his famous friends and associates. Michael Gross wrote in New York magazine:

The cast of characters ranges from employees to celebrities like Elizabeth Taylor ("like a fat little Kewpie doll"), Martin Scorsese ("coke problems"), Yves Saint Laurent ("he has to take a million pills"), Sophia Loren ("Didn't she f--- her way to the top?"), Elaine Kaufman ("stuffing herself with rolls"), Steve Rubell ("Gave me a Quaalude"), Liza Minnelli ("Give me every drug you've got"), Halston ("he gave her a bottle of coke, a few sticks of marijuana, a Valium, four Quaaludes"), Mick and Bianca Jagger ("She can't go to bed with him because she just doesn't think he's attractive"), Lady Isabella Lambton ("picks her nose and eats it"), Margaret Trudeau ("sitting on the toilet with her pants down and a coke spook up her nose"), Patti Smith ("all I could think about was her b.o."), Jerry Hall ("she had underarm b.o."), Allan Carr ("What a butterball"), Truman Capote ("How does anyone make it with Truman?"), Sue Mengers ("so vulgar"), Barbra Streisand ("West Side taste"), Rudolf Nureyev ("mean, he's really mean"), Raquel Welch ("sweet now that she's come down a little in the world"), Julian Schnabel ("very pushy"), Marina Cicogna ("like a truck driver"), Richard Nixon ("like a Dickens character"), Calvin and Kelly Klein ("a hot media affair"), Mercedes Kellogg ("a fat thing"), and lots more.

The final diary entry dates from February 17, 1987. That evening, Warhol walked the runway with jazz musician Miles Davis during a fashion show at the Tunnel nightclub in Chelsea, Manhattan. He noted that Davis gave him his address and proposed an exchange: Warhol would paint his portrait in return for ten minutes of Davis playing music for him. After returning home, Warhol called Hughes to say he was too exhausted to attend a Fendi dinner that night. He later received calls from Hughes' assistant Sam Bolton and Interview fashion editor Wilfredo Rosado before going to sleep.

== Publication ==
In June 1987, Warner Books acquired The Andy Warhol Diaries at an auction for $1.2 million. The book was published in May 1989. The absence of an index drew criticism from Fame magazine publisher Steven Greenberg and nightclub impresario Steve Rubell, who were frequent subjects of the book. Unauthorized indexes were subsequently published by Spy and Fame magazines. Newer editions of the book contain an authorized index. In 2014, The Andy Warhol Diaries was reissued by Twelve for the 25th anniversary.

== Reception ==
The Andy Warhol Diaries was a commercial success and remained on the New York Times Best Seller list for a few months. The book caused a sensation for its "sometimes malicious and often outrageous gossip about entertainers, artists and jet setters."

Many of Warhol's friends praised the book. Steve Rubell, co-founder of Studio 54 and the Palladium, said: "Everybody knew he was doing this. It's the truth, so nobody can say anything. It's making people crazy." "It's his style; it's his words … A few things are absolutely accurate. Some are sort of invented, but I'd say over his observations are keen," said Paige Powell, who was the advertising director for Warhol's Interview magazine. Former Interview editor Bob Colacello also stated that "some of it's true and some of it's not. Warhol's former assistant Ronnie Cutrone said: "He thought [the people he wrote about] were glamorous, but he pitied them. An artist is curious. It's not meanness. It's wanting to take something apart and see how it works. For once, there's a certain integrity to Andy."

However, some of Warhol's friends expressed their dissatisfaction with how they were portrayed in the book. Fashion designer Halston was reportedly "quite upset about the publication of these intimate revelations and was threatening to sue" before his death from AIDS in 1989. Halston's lover Victor Hugo called the book the "Satanic Diaries" and threatened to auction off every Warhol artwork he owned: "I feel like the Central Park jogger… I've been gang-raped and beaten by a dead person and bunch of thugs that work for him. It is the most vile, disgusting piece of pulp literature I have ever read." Model Barbara Allen felt betrayed and said Warhol exaggerated things. Human rights activist and former actress Bianca Jagger filed a libel lawsuit for how she was portrayed in the book, but she did not blame Warhol. "I don't believe Andy even wrote it," she said. "It is as if it had been fabricated by someone who had only a vague idea of what really happened. Andy was a mischievous man, but I didn't consider him to be vicious."

In 2008, Hackett told Glenn O'Brien in an interview for Interview: "People always ask 'What was Andy really like?' Well, read the Diaries. That's what he was like. When they came out, people focused on the gossip aspect of them, but as time goes on, I believe Andy's Diaries will be recognized as the incredible personal and historical document that they are."

== Adaptation ==
The book was adapted into a six-part Netflix docuseries The Andy Warhol Diaries. Written and directed by Andrew Rossi, the series premiered on March 9, 2022.
