= The Andy Warhol Museum =

Museum in Pittsburgh, Pennsylvania

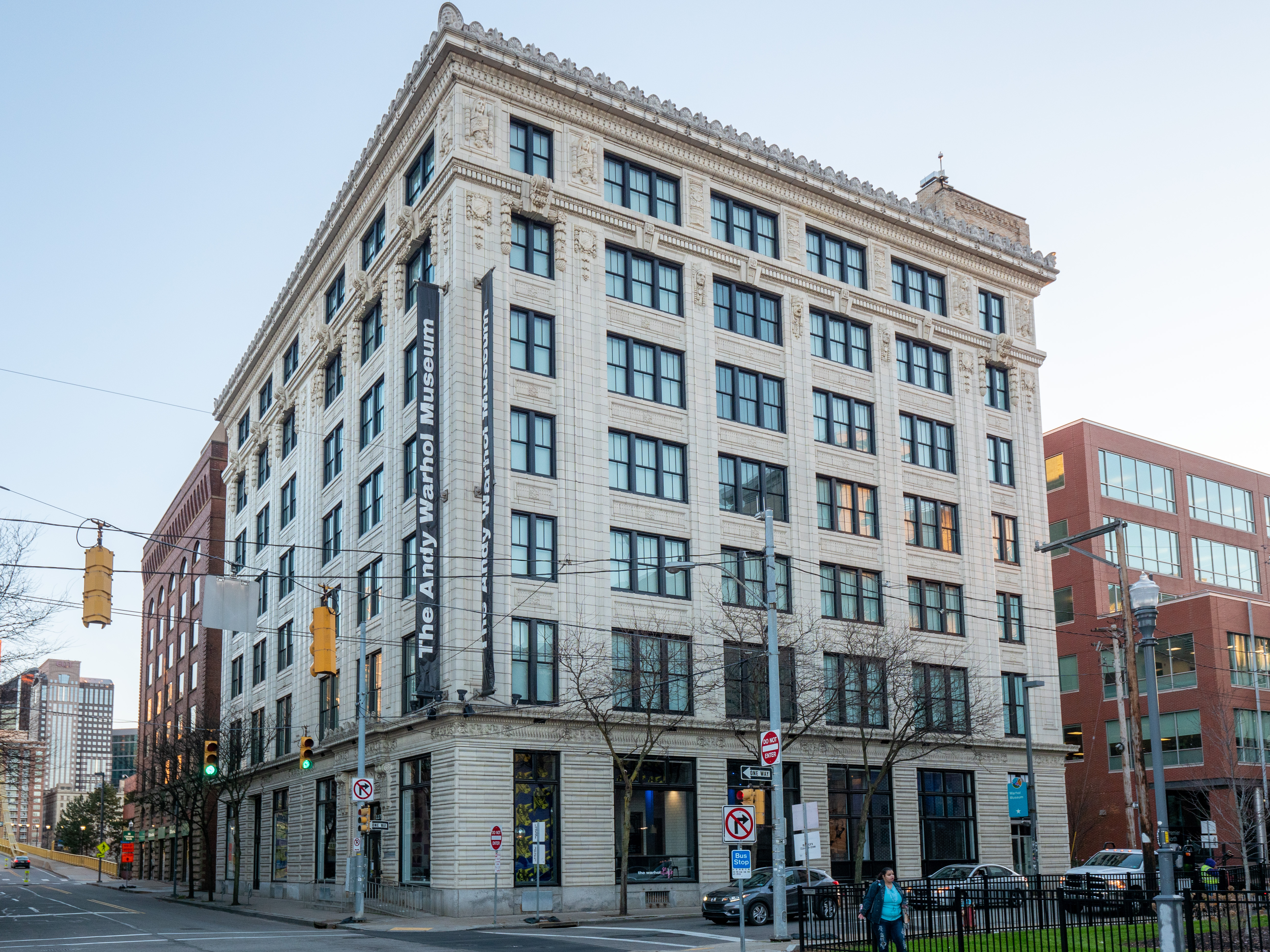
- The Andy Warhol Museum in 2020

- Location within Pittsburgh
- Established: May 13, 1994
- Location: 117 Sandusky Street; Pittsburgh, Pennsylvania, US
- Coordinates: 40.4484°N 80.0024°W
- Type: Art museum
- Visitors: 106,396 (2010)
- Director: Mario R. Rossero
- Public transit access: North Side
- Website: warhol.org

Pittsburgh Landmark – PHLF
- Official name: Andy Warhol Museum (Volkwein's, Frick & Lindsay Building)
- Designated: 2000

The Andy Warhol Museum is located on the North Shore of Pittsburgh, Pennsylvania, United States. It is the largest museum in North America dedicated to a single artist. The museum holds an extensive permanent collection of art and archives from the Pittsburgh-born pop art icon Andy Warhol.

The Andy Warhol Museum is one of the four Carnegie Museums of Pittsburgh and is a collaborative project of the Carnegie Institute, the Dia Art Foundation and The Andy Warhol Foundation for the Visual Arts (AWFVA).

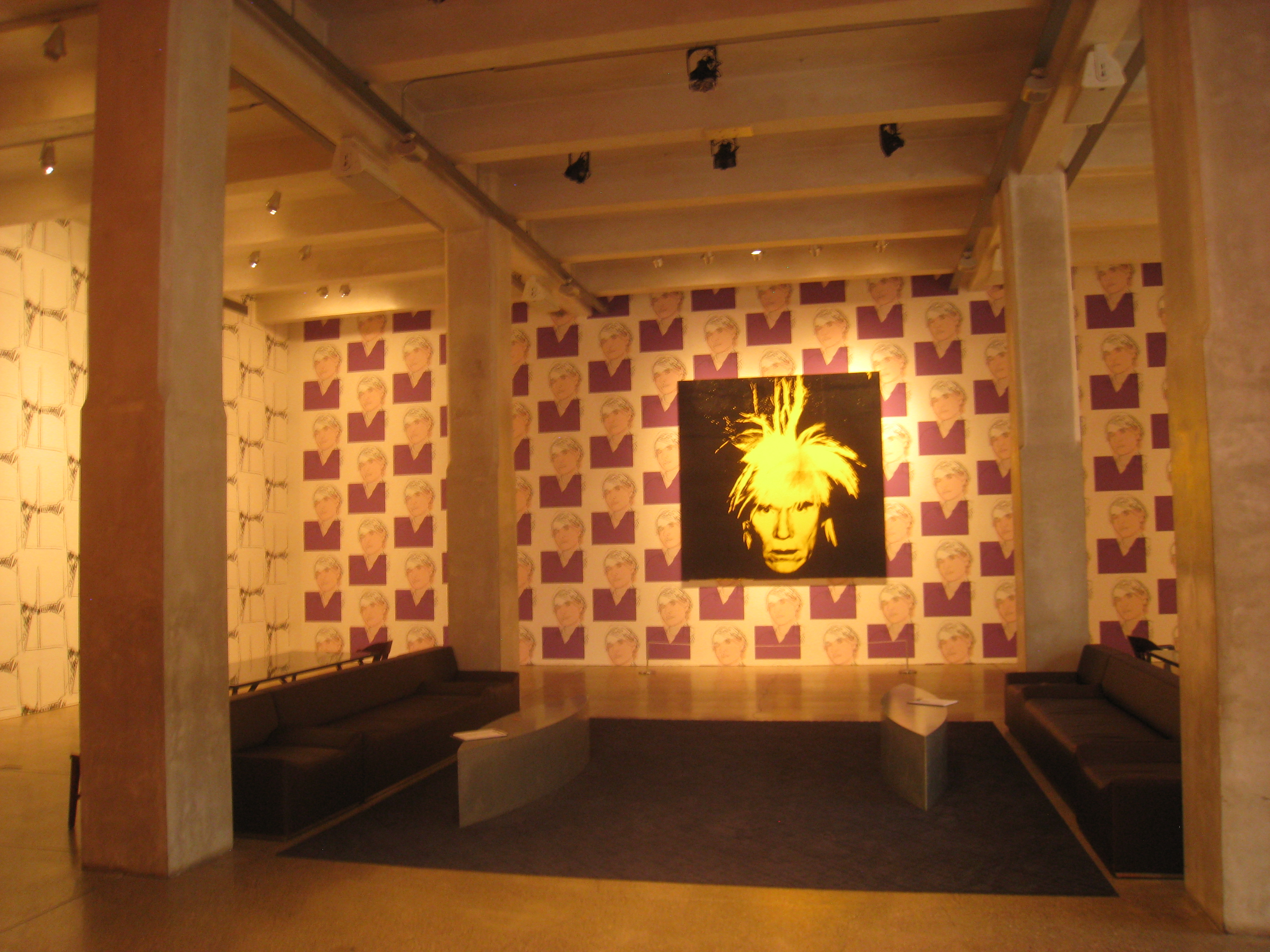
Warhol Self Portrait Exhibit in 2010

The museum is located in an 88,000-square-foot (8,200 m^{2}) facility on seven floors. Containing 17 galleries, the museum features 900 paintings, close to 2,000 works on paper, over 1,000 published unique prints, 77 sculptures, 4,000 photographs, and over 4,350 Warhol films and videotaped works. Its most recent operating budget (2010) was $6.1 million. In addition to its Pittsburgh location the museum has sponsored 56 traveling exhibits that have attracted close to nine million visitors in 153 venues worldwide since 1996.

== History ==
Plans for the museum were announced in October 1989, about 2½ years after Warhol's death. At the time of the announcement, works worth an estimated $80 million were donated to the newly announced museum by the AWFVA and the Dia Art Foundation. Thomas N. Armstrong III, who had been the director of the Whitney Museum of American Art from 1974 to 1990, was named the museum's first director in 1993. Matt Wrbican joined the staff of the museum before it opened, inventorying Warhol's belongings in New York, and has become the archivist and an expert on Warhol's work.

By 1993, the 88,000-square-foot (8,200 m^{2}) industrial warehouse and its extensive renovations had cost about $12 million, and the AWFVA had donated more than 1,000 of Warhol's works worth over $55 million, a donation that grew to about 3,000 works.

On May 13–14, 1994, the museum attracted about 25,000 visitors to its opening weekend. Armstrong, its founding director, resigned nine months after its opening; at the time of his resignation, the museum had had "tense relations" with the AWFVA and the Carnegie Institute, its financial backer, though The New York Times could find no one involved who would say whether that friction played a role in Armstrong's resignation.

On November 1, 1997, the AWFVA donated all Warhol film and video copyrights to the museum.

In 2013, it was announced that in Manhattan, New York City, in the Essex Crossing development on the Lower East Side, an annex to the main Pittsburgh museum was scheduled to open by 2017. However, the museum announced in March 2015 that it had dropped its plans to open the New York annex.

In October 2019, an audio tape of publicly unknown music by Lou Reed, based on Warhol's 1975 book, “The Philosophy of Andy Warhol: From A to B and Back Again”, was reported to have been discovered in an archive at the museum in Pittsburgh.

In 2022, the museum announced a $60 million expansion deemed The 'Pop District' covering six blocks in Pittsburgh, PA. The expansion looks to build a music venue, a social media studio called Warhol Creative, and expand places for public art exhibits. The proposed site would be around 58,000 square feet (17,500 square meters), including a first-floor concert venue with standing room for up to 1,000 people, a second-floor mezzanine, and an events space that could hold up to 360 people on the fourth floor. The third floor would be used for offices and support spaces. The project is expected to take ten years and is funded primarily through local foundations.

== In popular culture ==
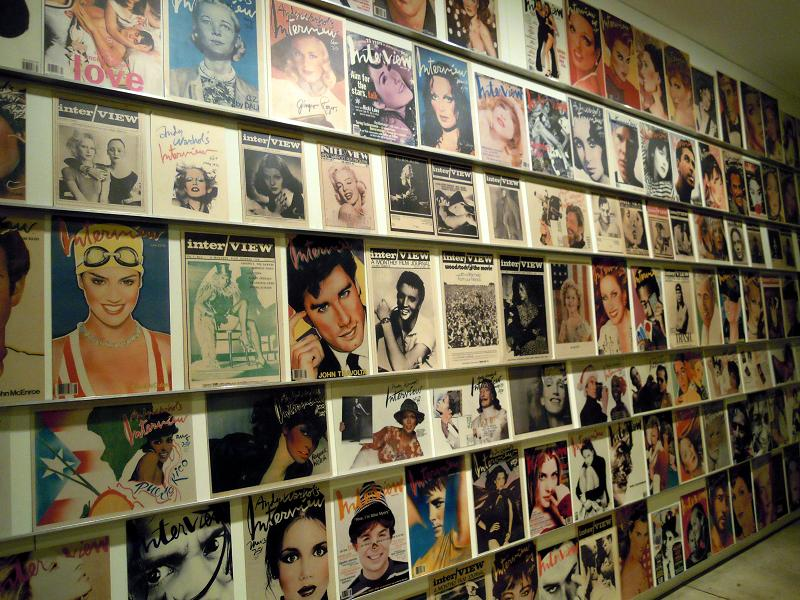
Display of Interview magazine covers

- The 2010 film She's Out of My League filmed a key scene at the museum during an evening event. The film's subject was hosting the event.
- The Andy Warhol Diaries in 2022 prominently featured museum staff as narrators of Warhol's life.

== See also ==
- List of single-artist museums
- Andy Warhol Museum of Modern Art, Medzilaborce, Slovakia
