= Ronnie Cutrone =

American painter

Ronnie Cutrone

Ronnie Cutrone (July 10, 1948 – July 20, 2013) was an American Neo-pop painter and nightclub impresario. He began his career as Pop Artist Andy Warhol's assistant before becoming known for his own paintings of cartoon characters. He was a performer with Warhol's Exploding Plastic Inevitable that also featured The Velvet Underground. Cutrone also helped run the New York City nightclub Mudd Club and later operated his own short term bar/dance club/cabaret space/tapas lounge nightclub called The Rubber Monkey at 279 Church Street in TriBeCa. His memories play a part in the history of punk rock book Please Kill Me: The Uncensored Oral History of Punk by Legs McNeil and Gillian McCain.

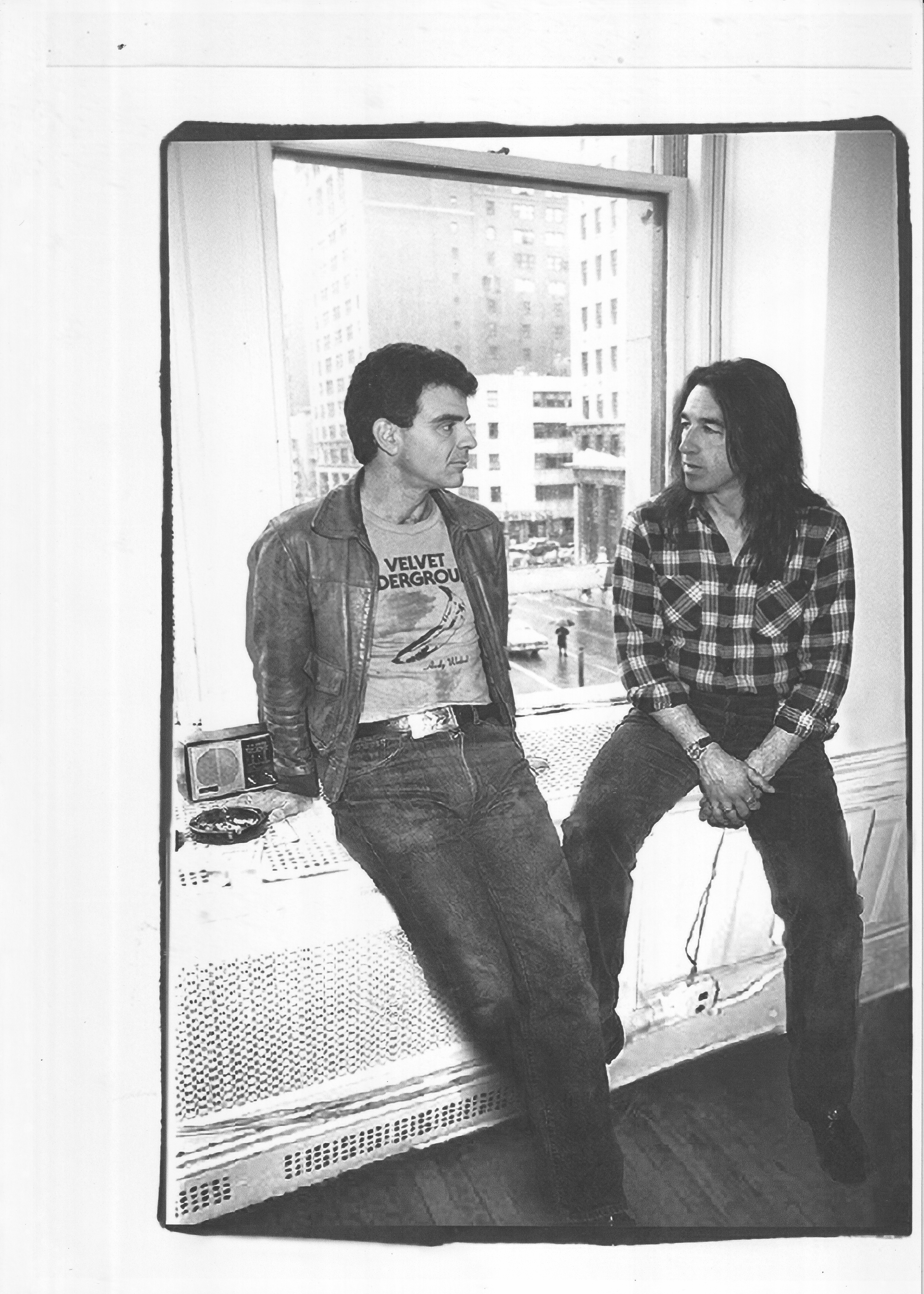
Ronnie Cutrone with Belgian friend NYC 1982

== Life and career ==
Ronald "Ronnie" Cutrone was born in New York City on July 10, 1948. He attended the School of Visual Arts in Manhattan.

As a teenager, Cutrone hung around pop artist Andy Warhol's Factory. He became a go-go dancer and among his first gigs was at the Dom Club on St. Marks Place in Manhattan's East Village. He also performed with the Velvet Underground. Cutrone was Warhol's studio assistant at the Factory from 1972 until 1982. He said Warhol was "a second father to me." He worked with Warhol on paintings, prints, films, and other concepts, co-opting Warhol's earliest work (pre-1960) as well as works by Roy Lichtenstein and others, until finally distilling those myriad influences into the style a few critics eventually labeled "Post-Pop." Cutrone's paintings are colorful and lively depictions of American cartoon characters such as Felix the Cat, Tweety Bird and Sylvester, Woody Woodpecker, the Pink Panther, and the Smurfs.

He exhibited at the Niveau Gallery in 1979 with a Scottish artist called Mike Gall who showed paintings of Snoopy, Mickey and Minnie Mouse, the Pink Panther and also a small series of Peter Rabbit paintings. Victor Hugo was the other artist who was featured in this group show which was called "Three New New York Artists."

Cutrone's works have been exhibited at: Whitney Museum (New York), Museum of Modern Art (New York), Museum Boijmans Van Beuningen (Rotterdam), the Museum of Contemporary Art, Los Angeles and fine art galleries internationally.

1979, he built a human-sized steel cage that was positioned in the middle of the Mudd Club in TriBeCa. He also helped the club's co-founder Steve Maas book talent at the club. He later built Club 82, where the New York Dolls and Blondie performed. In 2000, Cutrone opened the Rubber Monkey, a nightclub in TriBeCa.

== Personal life ==
Cutrone was married four times. His first two marriages to makeup artist Gigi Williams ended in divorce. In 1986, he married Kelly Cutrone, but they later divorced. His third wife was an Israeli woman, Einat Katav, and that marriage also ended in divorce.

Cutrone dated writer Tama Janowitz in the 1980s. Their relationship ended when Cutrone reconciled with his first wife Gigi Williams in 1985. The characters Eleanor and Stash in Janowitz's novel-in-stories Slaves of New York (1986) are based on Janowitz and Cutrone.

== Death ==
Cutrone died at his home in Lake Peekskill, New York on July 20, 2013. In December 2013, Hiram Noel Mendez of Cortlandt was charged with second-degree burglary and other offenses for stealing artwork from Cutrone's home. Reportedly, during a visit to Cutrone's home, Mendez found him unresponsive and took some of his artwork before notifying authorities hours later. Cutrone's associates noticed some artworks missing and notified the police.
