= Cultural depictions of Andy Warhol =

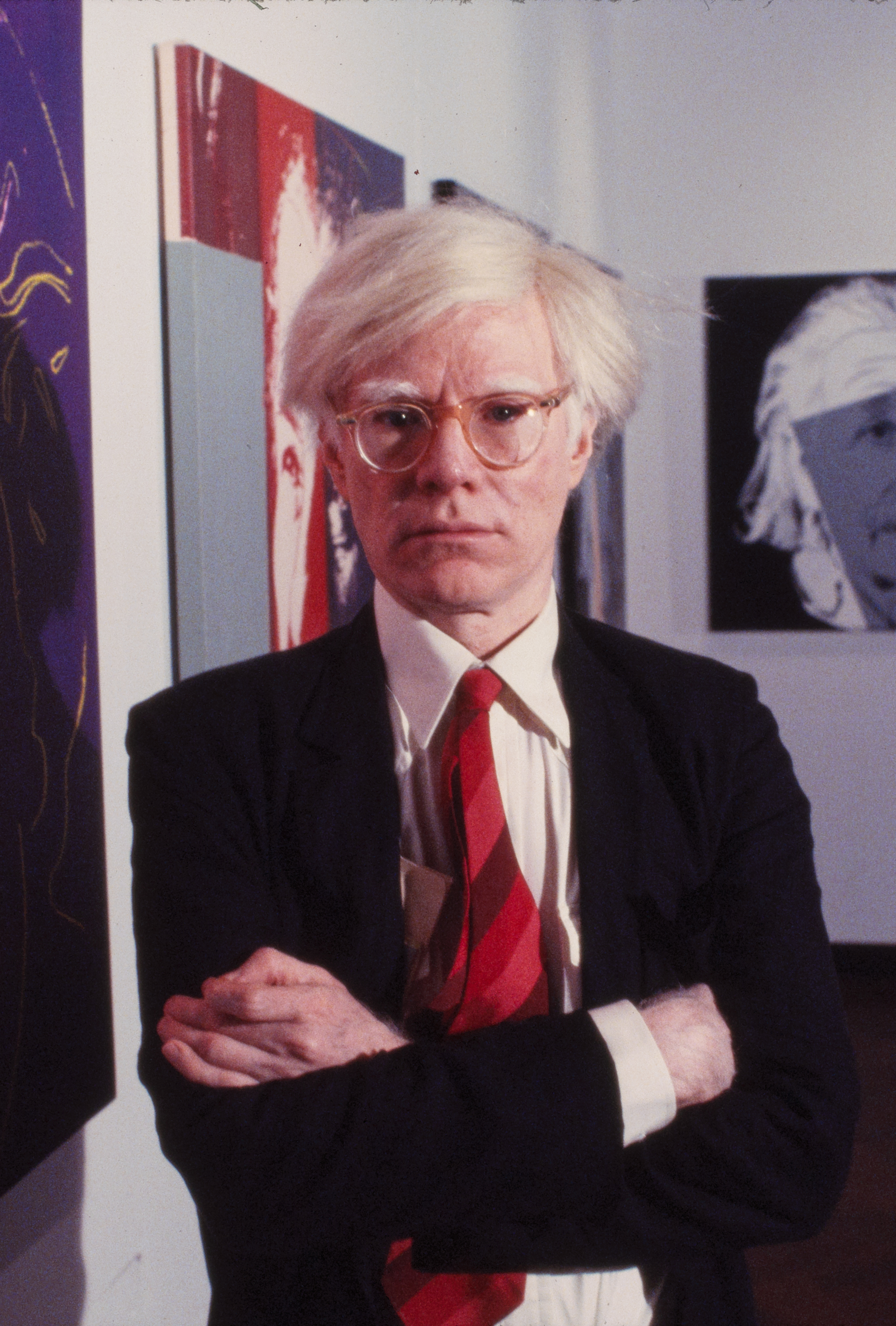
Warhol at the Jewish Museum, 1980

American artist and filmmaker Andy Warhol (1928–1987) deliberately cultivated a public persona that blurred the boundaries between artist, celebrity, and media personality, becoming a recognizable cultural figure during his lifetime. His distinctive appearance, soft-spoken manner, white-blond hair, and his studio, the Factory, have made him particularly recognizable in pop culture. Since his death, Warhol has been portrayed in film, television, theater, literature, and music, while his image and artistic legacy have been commemorated through fashion, public art, museums, and historic landmarks.

== Art ==
=== Paintings and drawings ===
Warhol has been depicted by numerous artists, including several with whom he had personal or professional relationships. In 1976, artist Jamie Wyeth exhibited paintings and drawings of Warhol and his dachshund Archie in Andy Warhol and Jamie Wyeth: Portraits of Each Other at New York's Coe Kerr Gallery.

In 1982, Jean-Michel Basquiat painted Dos Cabezas, a double portrait of himself and Warhol based on a Polaroid photograph Warhol took following their first formal meeting in October of that year. In 1984, Basquiat painted Brown Spots (Portrait of Andy Warhol as a Banana). Between 1985 and 1986, Keith Haring created the Andy Mouse series, which combined Warhol's likeness with Mickey Mouse to create the fictional character Andy Mouse.

=== Murals ===
In 1979, street artists Fab Five Freddy and Lee Quiñones paid homage to Warhol by spray-painting an entire New York City Subway train with images of Campbell's Soup Cans, bringing his Pop art imagery into the emerging graffiti and hip-hop culture of New York.

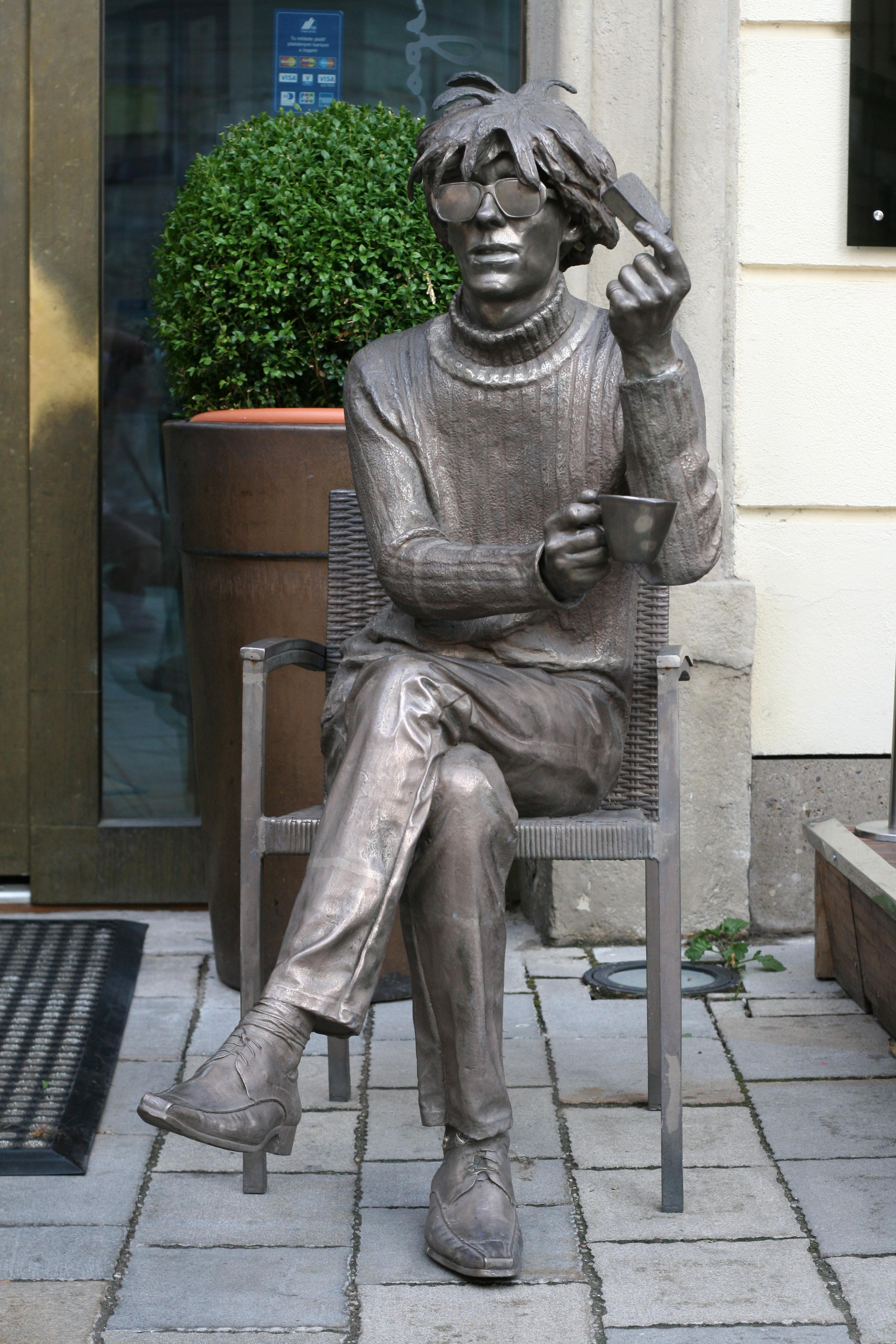
Statue of Warhol at the Camouflage Restaurant in Bratislava, Slovakia

In 2014, Brazilian street artist Eduardo Kobra painted Fight for Street Art! in Brooklyn, New York. The large-scale mural depicts Warhol alongside Jean-Michel Basquiat. In 2018, Kobra created another mural, Mount Rushmore of Art, in Chelsea, Manhattan, above the Empire Diner, depicting Warhol alongside Frida Kahlo, Keith Haring, and Basquiat.

In 2023, Mt. Lebanon artist Ashley Hodder painted a large-scale image of Warhol on a building on East Ohio Street in Pittsburg's North Side.

=== Sculptures ===
In 2002, Slovak sculptor Juraj Bartusz created Monument to Andy Warhol, depicting Warhol holding an umbrella outside the Andy Warhol Museum of Modern Art in Medzilaborce, Slovakia. A separate statue of Warhol was formerly installed outside the Camouflage Restaurant in Bratislava.

In 2005, Polish visual artist Sławomir Micek created a bust of Warhol for the "Alley of Fame" in Kielce, Poland.

In 2007, to mark the 20th anniversary of his death, the Royal Scottish Academy in Edinburgh hosted the largest exhibition of his work ever presented in Scotland. As part of the commemoration, images of Warhol's Campbell's Soup I prints were wrapped around the academy's columns, transforming its façade into a monumental Pop art installation.

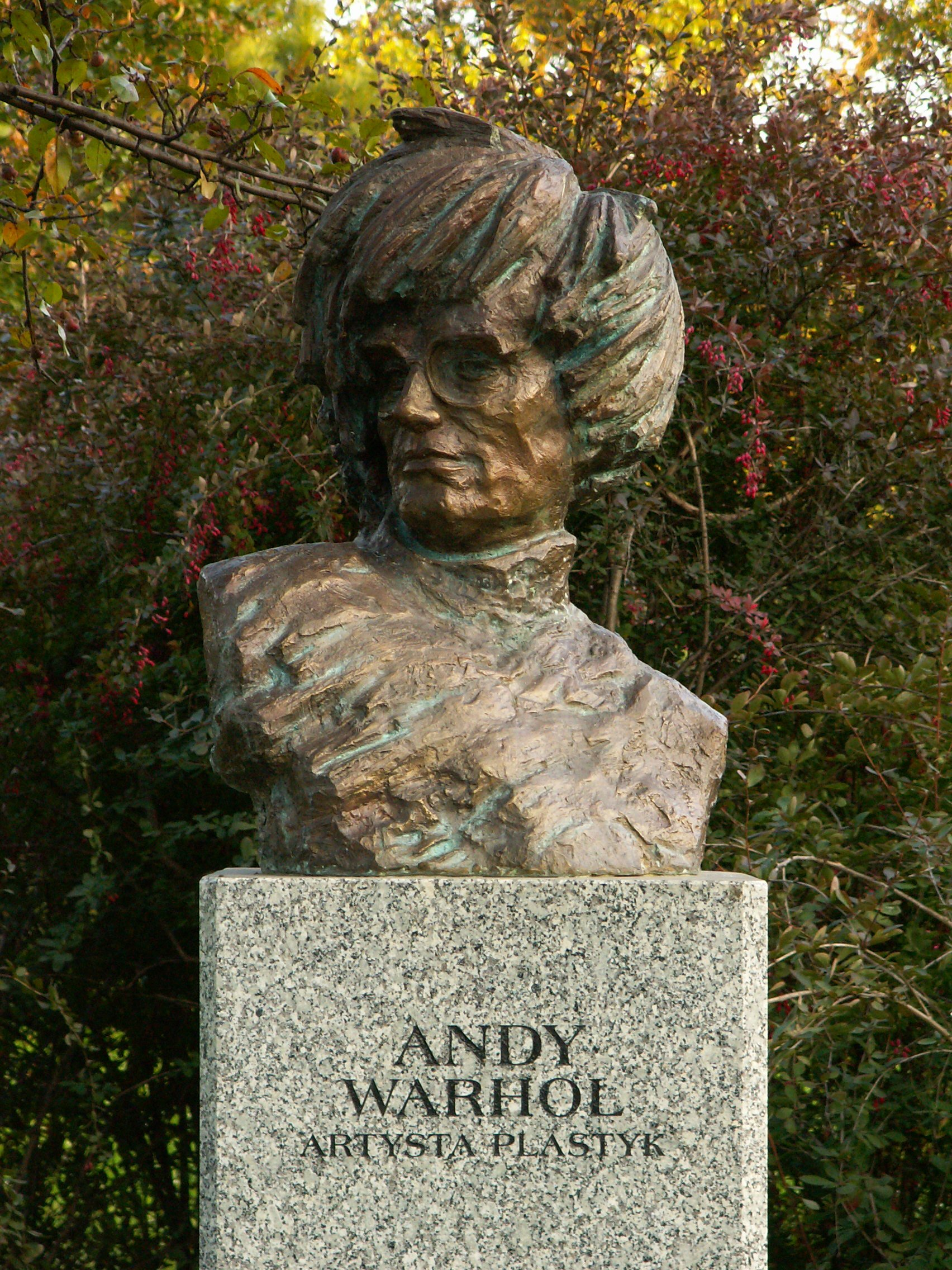
Bust of Warhol in Kielce, Poland

In 2011, artist Rob Pruitt, commissioned by the Public Art Fund, created a chrome sculpture of Warhol that was installed outside 860 Broadway in Manhattan's Union Square, the former site of the Factory. The sculpture was on view from March through October 2011.

In 2012, the Hornby Island Community Arts Council commissioned artist Roberta Pyx Sutherland to transform a dented, rusted tank on Hornby Island into Warhol Tribute, a public artwork inspired by Warhol's Campbell's Soup Cans series and created to mark its 50th anniversary.

In collaboration with EXMURO, Canadian art duo Cooke-Sasseville created The Odyssey (2014), a large-scale installation consisting of a giant Campbell's soup can flanked by three oversized pigeons. The work was first presented as part of the Passages Insolites exhibition in Quebec City in 2014 and 2015 and was subsequently installed at various locations in Ottawa. In 2025, it was exhibited in Springfield, Massachusetts, marking the work's first installation in the United States.

In 2016, an outdoor light projection featuring the multi-colored Marilyn Monroe prints served as the public promotional display for the exhibition Andy Warhol. Pop Society at Palazzo Ducale in Genoa.

== Fashion ==
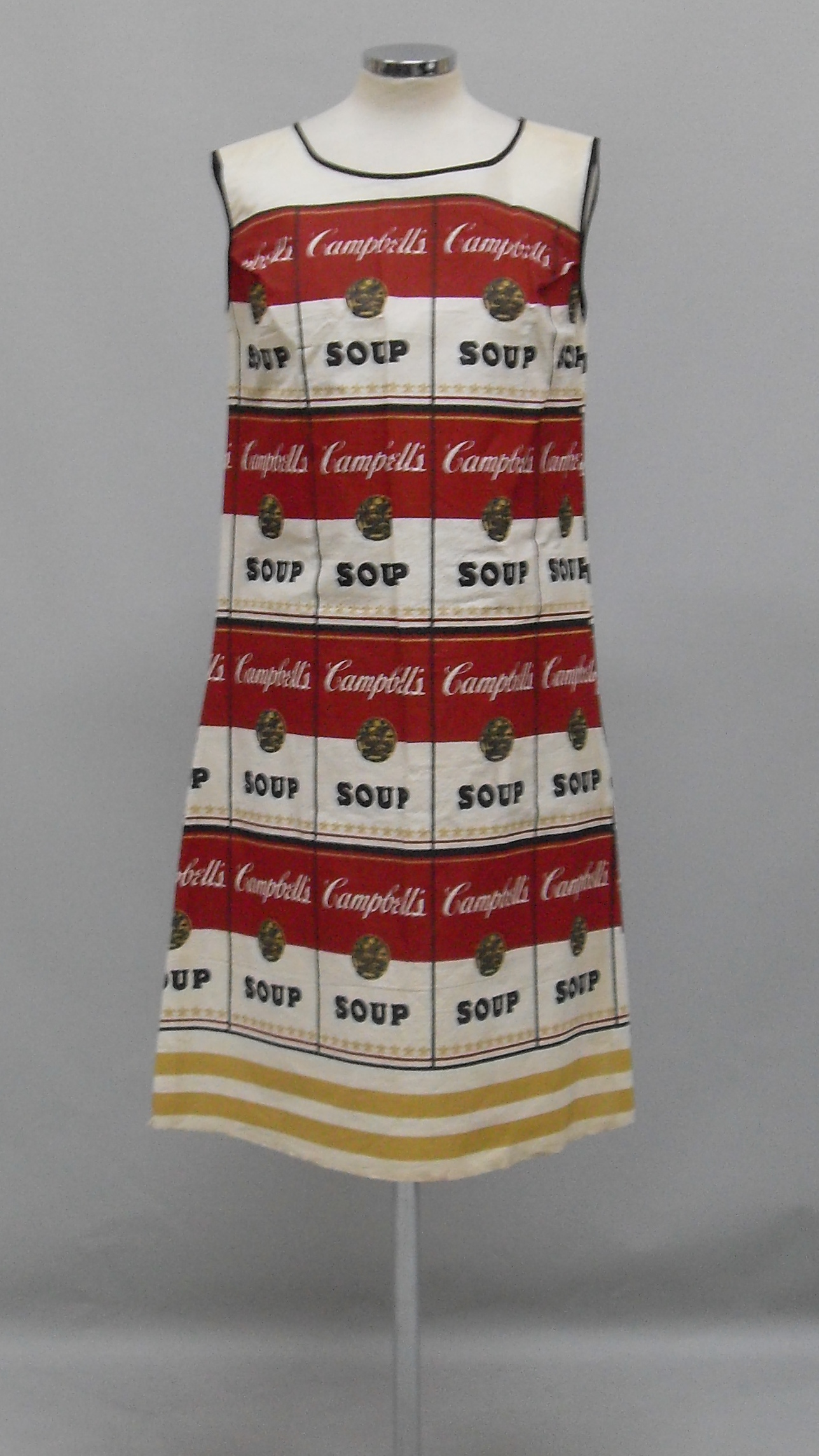
1967 Souper Dress

During the paper dress craze of the 1960s, the Campbell Company produced the Souper Dress, a promotional garment whose printed design directly referenced Warhol's Campbell's Soup Cans series.

Warhol was a close friend of fashion designer Halston and he created a "happening" for Halton's presentation at the Coty American Fashion Critics' Awards. For the Fall 1974 collection, Halston incorporated patterns based on Warhol's Flowers lithographs.

For the 1975 exhibition Fashion as Fantasy at the Rizzoli Gallery in New York, he deconstructed and reassembled garments by different designers, combining pieces bearing labels such as Stephen Burrows and Valentino.

In the 1980s, Warhol became friends with artist Keith Haring, who cited Warhol as an influence on the Pop Shop, which opened in New York in 1986. Warhol allowed Haring to use his 1986 Self-Portrait for T-shirt designs. Several shirts were produced before Warhol's business manager, Fred Hughes, objected and the designs were discontinued.

Fashion designer Stephen Sprouse regarded Warhol as a mentor, and Warhol encouraged him to pursue both painting and fashion. As a tribute following Warhol's death, Sprouse incorporated Warhol's Camouflage screenprint into his Fall 1987 and Spring 1988 collections, reproducing it in brightly colored variations and crediting Warhol on the garment labels.

Gianni Versace was reportedly an admirer of Warhol's work, and for the Versace Spring/Summer 1991 collection, he incorporated Warhol's screenprints of Marilyn Monroe and James Dean into various garments.

The 1994 Calvin Klein CK One advertising campaign, photographed by Steven Meisel, drew inspiration from Avedon's 1969 portrait Andy Warhol and Members of the Factory, New York.

In 1997, the Whitney Museum of American Art mounted the exhibition The Warhol Look: Glamour, Style, Fashion, organized by the Andy Warhol Museum, underscoring the lasting impact of fashion on his artistic legacy.

In 1967, Warhol spray-painted Coca-Cola bottles silver and filled them with a citrus fragrance, that he reportedly claimed was toilet water. The project was abandoned after the Coca-Cola Company issued a cease-and-desist letter. In 2017, Japanese fashion label Comme des Garçons revived the concept with Andy Warhol's You're In, a unisex fragrance introduced during New York Fashion Week. The fragrance features notes of bitter orange, jasmine, and makrut lime zest packaged in six silver bottles, each bearing a quotation by Warhol.

In 2024, Piaget introduced the 15102, or "Black Tie" collection, as the "Andy Warhol Watch," referencing the artist's longstanding affinity for the brand. The following year, Piaget introduced the limited-edition Andy Warhol "Collage" watch, inspired by Warhol's 1986 self-portrait collage.

In 2026, Carolina Herrera's Spring/Summer 2027 collection, designed by Wes Gordon, featured a dress incorporating Warhol's 1979 portrait of Herrera to mark the fashion house's 45th anniversary.

== Film and television ==
Warhol appeared in several films during his lifetime, including The Driver's Seat (1974), Cocaine Cowboys (1979) and Tootsie (1982). He has been portrayed in numerous narrative films since his death in 1987, ranging from biographical dramas to comic and highly fictionalized appearances. The Guardian described Warhol as one of the more frequently portrayed figures in film and television, noting the relative ease with which his public persona could be reproduced onscreen.

In 2020, Jared Leto confirmed that he had been cast to portray Warhol in the biographical film Warhol, produced by Michael De Luca and written by Terence Winter, based on the 1989 book Warhol: The Biography by Victor Bockris.

=== Portrayals in film ===
Year	Film	Actor	Notes
1991	The Doors	Crispin Glover	Jim Morrison encounters Warhol at a downtown Manhattan party
1991	Caldo soffocante	Allen Midgette	Italian film directed by Giovanna Gagliardo
1992	Death Becomes Her	Bob Swain	Warhol is an immortal guest at Lisle von Rhuman's ballroom party
1996	I Shot Andy Warhol	Jared Harris	Dramatizes events leading up to Valerie Solanas' attempt to assassinate Warhol
1996	Basquiat	David Bowie	Warhol befriends Jean-Michel Basquiat and they collaborate on paintings
1997	Austin Powers: International Man of Mystery	Mark Bringleson	Warhol appears at the Electric Psychedelic Pussycat Swingers Club
1998	54	Sean Sullivan	Warhol appears as a party-goer at Studio 54
2003	Any Way the Wind Blows	Sergio De Beukelaer	Warhol appears in a hallucination of gallery owner Firmin
2003	Ghostlight	Clark Render	A camp biopic on Martha Graham
2006	Factory Girl	Guy Pearce	Dramatizes Edie Sedgwick's relationship with Warhol
2009	Watchmen	Greg Travis	Warhol appears alongside Truman Capote displaying his art
2012	Men in Black 3	Bill Hader	Warhol is as an undercover Men in Black agent at the Factory
2017	The Billionaire Boys Club	Cary Elwes	Ron Levin dines with Warhol at Spago
2022	Weird: The Al Yankovic Story	Conan O'Brien	Warhol is a guest at a pool party

=== Television ===
Warhol had a longstanding fascination with television, which became an important part of both his artistic practice and public persona. He began watching television regularly after acquiring an RCA television set in the 1950s and later incorporated the medium into his work through experimental productions and television programs. He also appeared in several commercials. In the final year of his life, he began a series of paintings depicting images from the history of American television, although only one, Moonwalk, based on the 1969 televised Moon landing, was completed.

Warhol also produced three television programs: Fashion (1979–1980), Andy Warhol's TV (1980–1983), and the MTV talk show Andy Warhol's Fifteen Minutes (1985–1987). Through these programs, he extended his interest in celebrity, popular culture, and mass media into television itself. His television work ranged from fashion and interviews to experimental programming and candid footage of figures associated with his social circle.

In October 1985, Warhol appeared as a fictionalized version of himself in the television series The Love Boat for the 200th episode. his presence is connected to the past of a woman who had once been one of his "superstars." Art historian Branden W. Joseph later examined Warhol's appearance on The Love Boat as an example of the artist's penetration into mass-market commercial culture.

After Warhol's death, he became a recurring subject of fictional television portrayals. Jeffrey Weissman played Warhol in the NBC miniseries The 1970s (2000). In Noel Fielding's Luxury Comedy (2012), Tom Meeten parodies Warhol, working first as a housekeeper and later as a barista. John Cameron Mitchell portrayed Warhol in the HBO television series Vinyl (2016). Evan Peters portrayed Warhol in the American Horror Story episode "Valerie Solanas Died for Your Sins, Scumbag" (2017), which dramatizes the relationship between Warhol and Solanas and her attempt to kill him.

Warhol has also been represented in animated television. In The Simpsons 1991 episode "Brush with Greatness," in which Warhol's Campbell's Soup Can is seen in an art gallery. In the 1999 episode "Mom and Pop Art," voiced by Hank Azaria, Warhol appears in a dream sequence in which he throws Campbell's soup cans at Homer Simpson.

In 2019, Burger King eatured Warhol in a Super Bowl commercial in which he is shown silently eating a Whopper hamburger. The footage was taken from 66 Scenes from America, a 1982 film by Danish director Jørgen Leth that documented scenes of American life.

=== Documentaries ===
Andy Warhol and his Clan (1970), a 46-minute documentary directed by German filmmaker Bert Koetter, examines Warhol's personality and work through interviews and observations of his "superstars."

Warhol (1973), an ITV documentary produced by photographer David Bailey. It features Bailey interviewing Warhol and members of his Factory, including Candy Darling and Paul Morrissey. The documentary attracted controversy for its "references to homosexuality and transvestism," and a scene of Brigid Berlin painting with her breast, resulting in a temporary ban by British courts on grounds of indecency before the decision was overturned. The program was eventually broadcast on March 27, 1973.

Superstar: The Life and Times of Andy Warhol (1990), directed by Chuck Workman, is an 87-minute feature-length documentary chronicles Warhol's life, career, and cultural impact. It includes interviews with artists, dealers, and cultural figures including Dennis Hopper, Viva, Ultra Violet, Tom Wolfe, Bob Colacello, Irving Blum, Fran Lebowitz, and Warhol's brother Paul Warhola. The film premiered at the 40th Berlin International Film Festival.

Andy Warhol: E! True Hollywood Story (1998), a profile on the life and career of Warhol with interviews by singer Grace Jones and musician Rick Ocasek. It premiered on E! television network on March 15, 1998.

Andy Warhol: A Life at the Edge, a documentary produced for the A&E Biography series. The program charts Warhol's journey from his humble upbringing in Pittsburgh to the pinnacle of the New York art scene. Among those interviewed are singer Debbie Harry, biographer Victor Bockris, gallerist Ivan Karp, and Warhol's brothers Paul and John Warhola. It premiered on June 8, 1998.

Absolut Warhola (2001), directed by Polish filmmaker Stanisław Mucha, explores Warhol's Rusyn heritage by traveling to the eastern Slovak villages associated with his parents and their families.

Andy Warhol: A Documentary Film (2006), directed by Ric Burns, is a two-part documentary produced for the PBS series American Masters. It examines Warhol's childhood, career, artistic practice, Factory circle, and influence on American culture. The film received a Peabody Award in 2006.

Andy Warhol's People Factory (2008), directed by Catherine Shorr, is a three-part television documentary featuring interviews with people who knew and worked with Warhol. The series focuses on members of his Factory circle and their recollections of Warhol and the social world surrounding his studio.

The Andy Warhol Diaries (2022), a six-part documentary series directed by Andrew Rossi, based on Warhol's diaries edited by Pat Hackett. The series uses archival footage, interviews, and recreations to explore Warhol's private life and relationships, contrasting them with his carefully constructed public persona. Bill Irwin provides the narration, with his voice combined with artificial intelligence technology to impersonate Warhol. The series premiered on Netflix on March 9, 2022.

== Literature and theater ==
=== Non-fiction books ===
Warhol has been the subject of numerous books, including the authorized biography Warhol (1989) by art critic David Bourdon, which began before his death, Warhol: The Biography (1989) by writer Victor Bockris, former Interview editor Bob Colacello's Holy Terror: Andy Warhol Close Up (1990), and Unseen Warhol (1996), by former Warhol associates John O'Connor and Benjamin Liu. Later biographies include cultural critic Wayne Koestenbaum's Andy Warhol (2001), and art critic Blake Gopnik's Warhol (2020).

=== Comics ===
Warhol has also appeared in comic books, including the Miracleman series, Nick Bertozzi's Becoming Andy Warhol (2016), and Typex's graphic novel Andy: The Life and Times of Andy Warhol (2018).

=== Portrayals in theater ===
Warhol appeared as a character in the 1997 chamber opera Jackie O, composed by Michael Daugherty with a libretto by Wayne Koestenbaum. The opera, which is set partly in Warhol's studio during 1968, features Warhol among a group of historical and celebrity figures including Jacqueline Kennedy Onassis, Maria Callas, Grace Kelly, Aristotle Onassis, and Elizabeth Taylor. The role was originated by baritone Daniel Belcher in the Houston Grand Opera production.

In 2017, Warhol was portrayed by Stephen Spinella in WARHOLCAPOTE, a play by Rob Roth that premiered at the American Repertory Theater in Cambridge, Massachusetts. Directed by Michael Mayer, the play was assembled from taped conversations between Warhol and writer Truman Capote recorded in the 1970s. In 2022, Roth published the play as ''WARHOLCAPOTE: A Non-Fiction Invention."

In 2022, Warhol and Jean-Michel Basquiat were portrayed in the play The Collaboration, written by Anthony McCarten and directed by Kwame Kwei-Armah. Paul Bettany played Warhol and Jeremy Pope played Basquiat in the original production at London's Young Vic, which dramatized their collaboration and friendship in 1980s New York. The production subsequently transferred to Broadway, where Bettany and Pope reprised their roles.

In 2022, Andy Warhol in Iran, a play by Brent Askari and directed by Skip Greer, premiered at Barrington Stage Company in Pittsfield, Massachusetts. The play imagines Warhol in a Tehran hotel room during his 1976 visit to Iran to photograph members of the Pahlavi dynasty, where he encounters an Iranian waiter and revolutionary who has come to kidnap him for political purposes. Henry Stram portrayed Warhol in the premiere production. In 2023, Rob Lindley portrayed him in a production at Northlight Theatre in Evanston, Illinois. In 2025, Alex Mills played Warhol in a production by the Mosaic Theater Company in Washington, D.C.

== Museums and landmarks ==
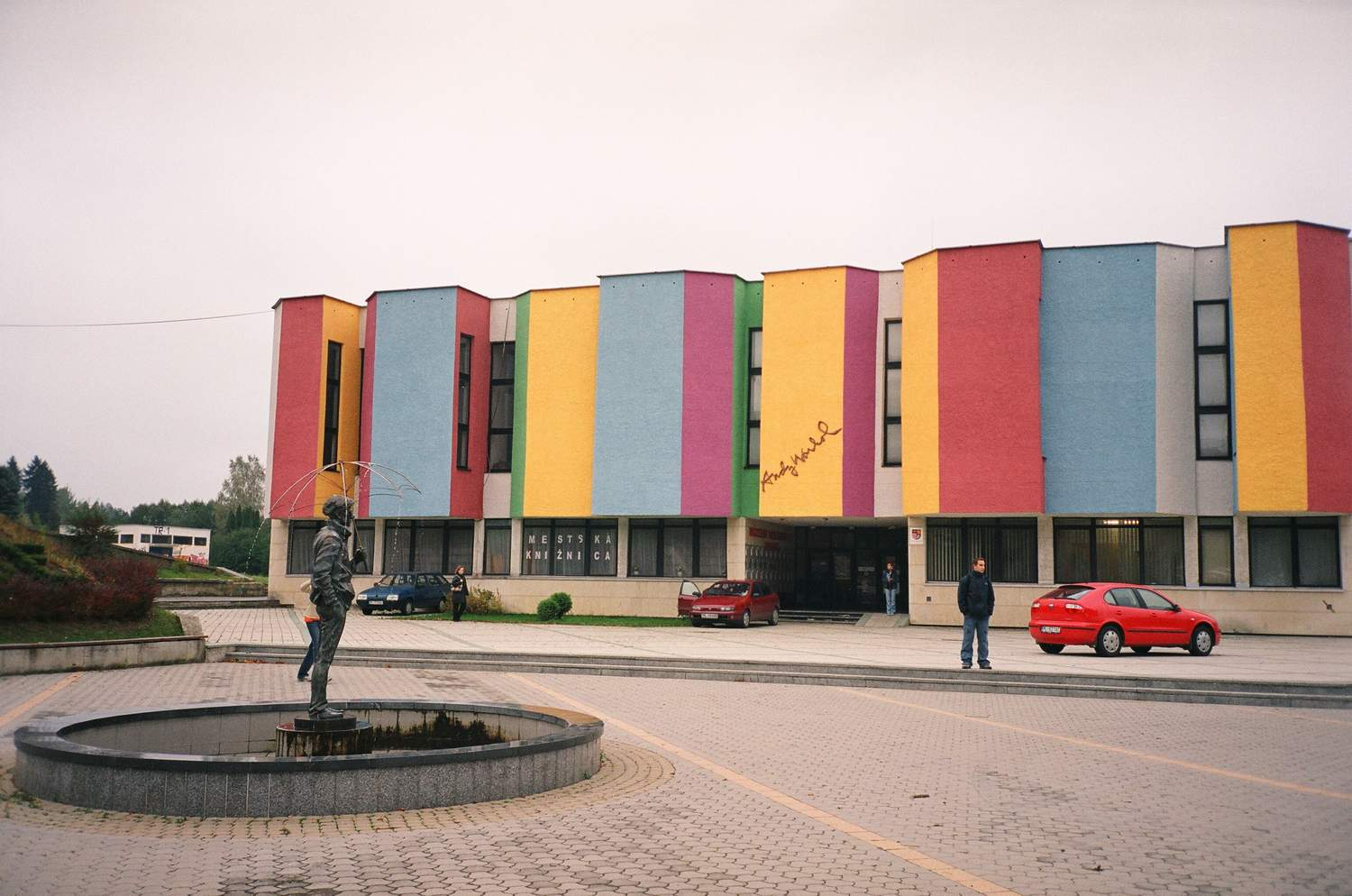
Andy Warhol Museum of Modern Art, Medzilaborce

Warhol's legacy has been commemorated through museums, historic landmarks, and other institutions in the United States and Slovakia. In 1991, the Warhol Family Museum of Modern Art was established in Medzilaborce, Slovakia, by members of Warhol's family and the Slovak Ministry of Culture. It was renamed the Andy Warhol Museum of Modern Art in 1996.

In 1994, The Andy Warhol Museum opened in Pittsburgh, housing the largest collection of Warhol's works in the world.

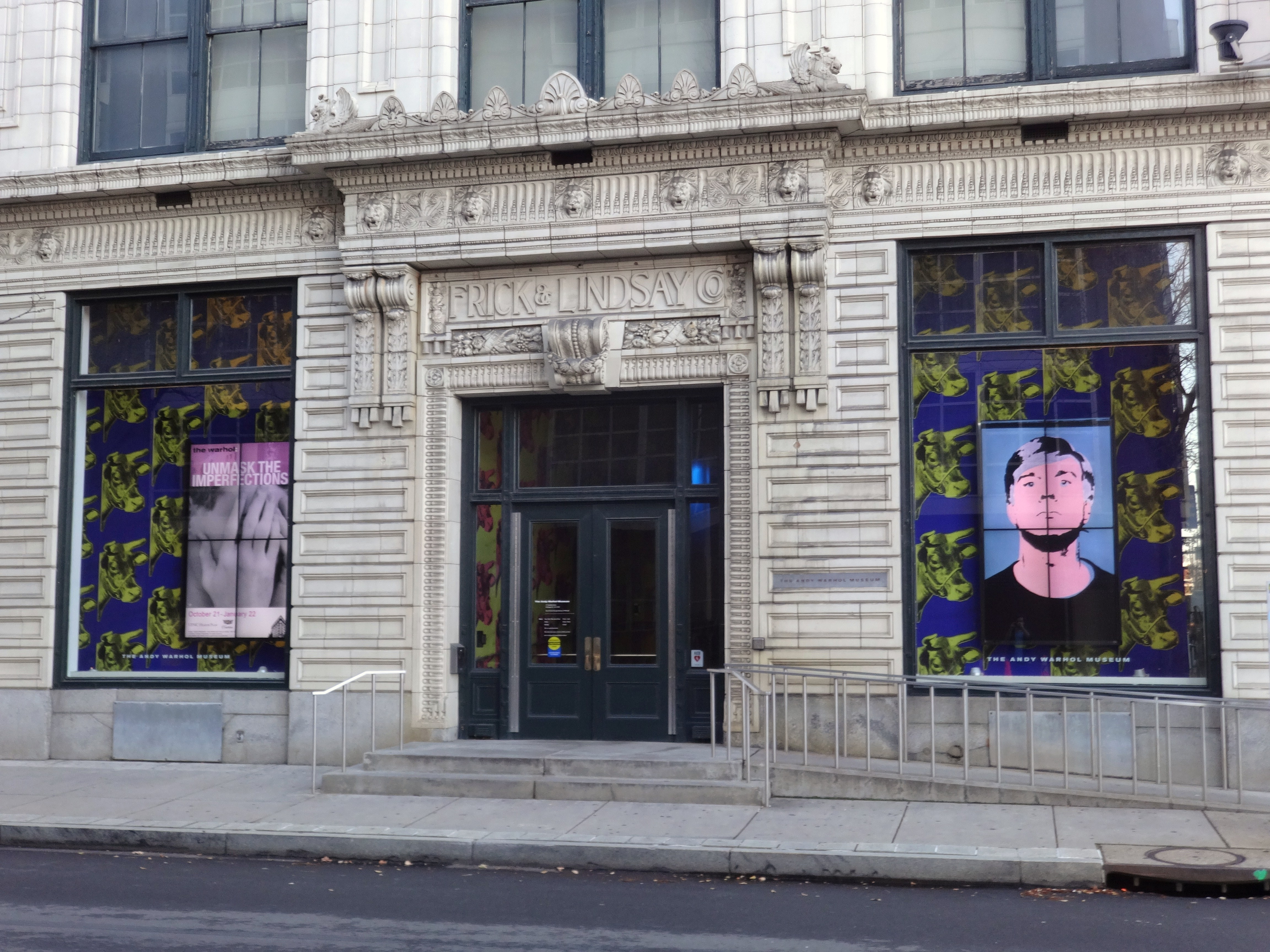
Andy Warhol Museum, Pittsburgh

In 1998, Warhol's former townhouse at 57 East 66th Street on Manhattan's Upper East Side was designated a cultural landmark by the Historical Landmarks Preservation Center to commemorate the 70th anniversary of his birth. In 2005, Pittsburgh's Seventh Street Bridge was renamed the Andy Warhol Bridge in his honor. In 2012, the International Astronomical Union named a crater on the planet Mercury after him.

In 2013, to mark the 85th anniversary of Warhol's birth, The Andy Warhol Museum and EarthCam launched Figment, a live-streaming project that provided a continuous view of Warhol's gravesite at St. John the Baptist Byzantine Catholic Cemetery in Bethel Park, Pennsylvania.

== Music ==
Warhol was closely involved with the New York music scene. In 1963, he founded The Druds, a short-lived avant-garde noise music group featuring members of the city's proto-conceptual and minimal art communities. In 1965, he adopted The Velvet Underground and made the band a central component of the Exploding Plastic Inevitable, his multimedia performance art show, and produced their debut album The Velvet Underground & Nico.

Warhol has had a lasting influence on popular music and musicians across genres. He was a key inspiration for the new wave and punk band Devo, as well as English musician David Bowie, who recorded the song "Andy Warhol" for his 1971 album Hunky Dory.

Warhol's life and experiences also directly inspired specific works. Lou Reed wrote "Andy's Chest" in response to Warhol's near fatal shooting; although first recorded by the Velvet Underground in 1969, it was later released in a new version on Reed's solo album Transformer (1972). The Canadian rock band Triumph referenced Warhol in "Stranger in a Strange Land," from their 1984 album Thunder Seven.

In 1990, Lou Reed and John Cale, former members of the Velvet Underground, released Songs for Drella, an album about Warhol following his death in 1987.

=== Music videos ===
During his lifetime, Warhol also appeared in several music videos, including "Hello Again" (1984) by The Cars, "Misfit" (1986) by Curiosity Killed the Cat, and "I'm Not Perfect (But I'm Perfect for You)" (1986) by Grace Jones. His cultural presence has continued beyond his lifetime. In the 1995 video for "Scream" by Michael Jackson and Janet Jackson, a self-portrait of Warhol morphs into a splatter painting by Jackson Pollock.

== Photography ==
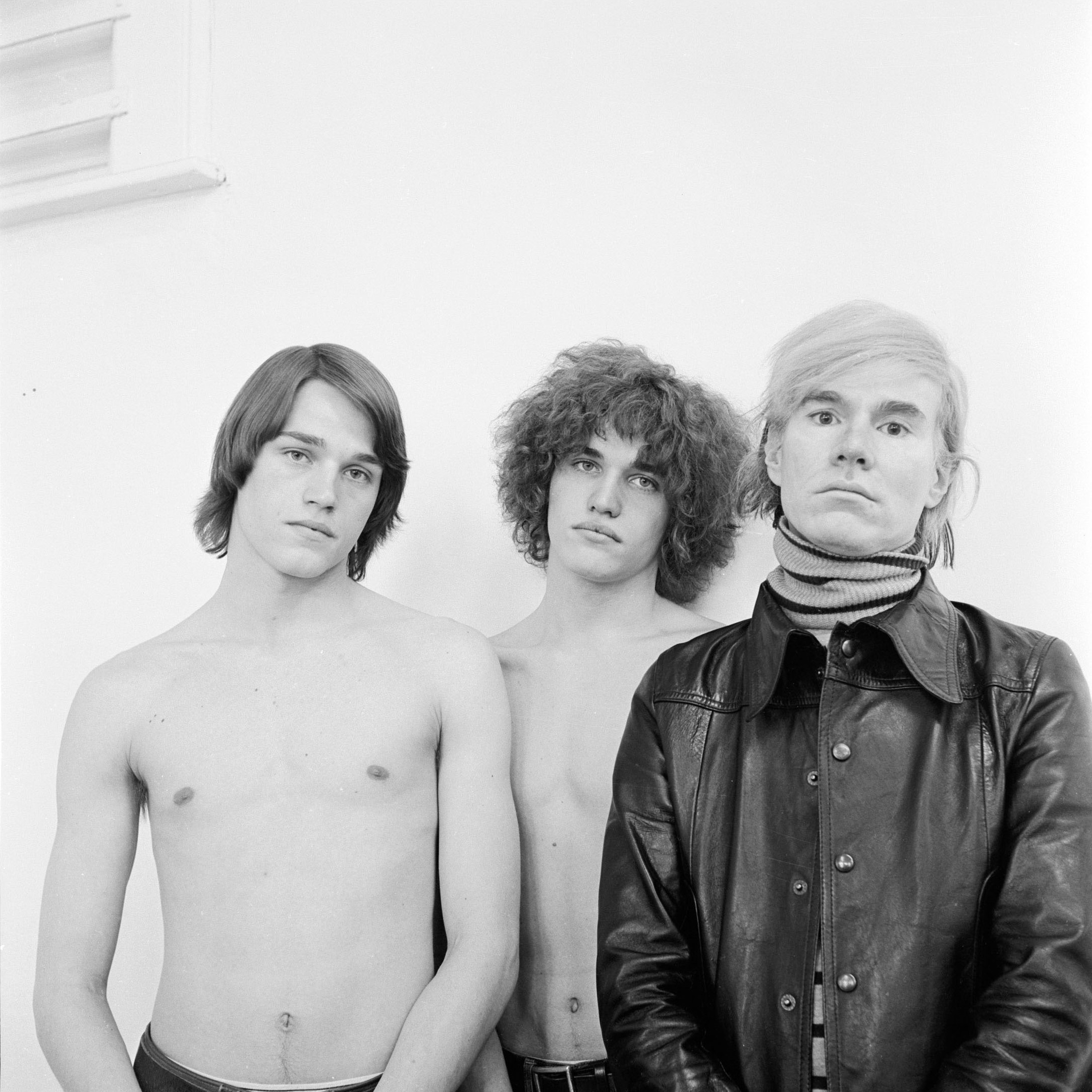
Warhol with his partner Jed Johnson and superstar Jay Johnson at the Factory by Cecil Beaton, 1969

Warhol was an avid photographer and has been the subject of numerous exhibitions following the digitization of his archive, acquired by Stanford University in 2014 and comprising approximately 3,600 contact sheets and 130,000 negatives. That same year, the Rhode Island School of Design Museum presented Andy Warhol's Photographs, featuring more than 150 Polaroid and black-and-white images. Subsequent highlights include Contact Warhol: Photography Without End at the Cantor Arts Center from 2018 to 2019, which explored the scope of his contact sheet archive.

From April 30 to October 19, 2026, the Whitney Museum of American Art presented Andy Warhol: Family Album, an exhibition of 732 Polaroids taken between 1972 and 1973 depicting Warhol's family and friends. His photographic work has also been featured in publications such as Andy Warhol: Polaroids 1958–1987 (2015).

Warhol was photographed by some of the most prominent photographers of the 20th century. He also gave opportunities to numerous emerging photographers, allowing them to photograph life at the Factory and contribute to Interview magazine. Many of these photographers subsequently established successful careers in fashion, art, and photojournalism. Photographers who have captured Warhol include:

- Bob Adelman
- Eve Arnold
- Richard Avedon
- Peter Beard
- David Bailey
- Cecil Beaton
- Harry Benson
- Michael Cooper
- William Coupon
- Elliott Erwitt
- Nat Finkelstein
- Ron Galella
- Milton H. Greene
- Michael Halsband
- Philippe Halsman
- Dennis Hopper
- Horst P. Horst
- Yousuf Karsh
- William John Kennedy
- Bill King
- Douglas Kirkland
- Tseng Kwong Chi
- David LaChappelle
- Annie Leibovitz
- Marcus Leatherdale
- Christopher Makos
- Gerard Malanga
- Robert Mapplethorpe
- Duane Michals
- Jack Mitchell
- Billy Name
- Helmut Newton
- Francesco Scavullo
- Jerry Schatzberg
- Stephen Shore
- Alfred Statler
- Oliviero Toscani
- Albert Watson
- Weegee
- Firooz Zahedi

== Stamps ==
In 2002, the United States Postal Service issued an 18-cent commemorative stamp honoring Warhol. Designed by Richard Sheaff of Scottsdale, Arizona, the stamp features Warhol's 1964 Self-Portrait and was unveiled at a ceremony at The Andy Warhol Museum in Pittsburgh.

== Video games ==
He also appears in the video game The Sims: Superstar (2003).

== Sources ==
- Spigel, Lynn (2008). TV by Design: Modern Art and the Rise of Network Television. Chicago: University of Chicago Press. ISBN 978-0-226-76968-4.
