= Freedom, Pennsylvania =

Borough in Pennsylvania, US

- Borough
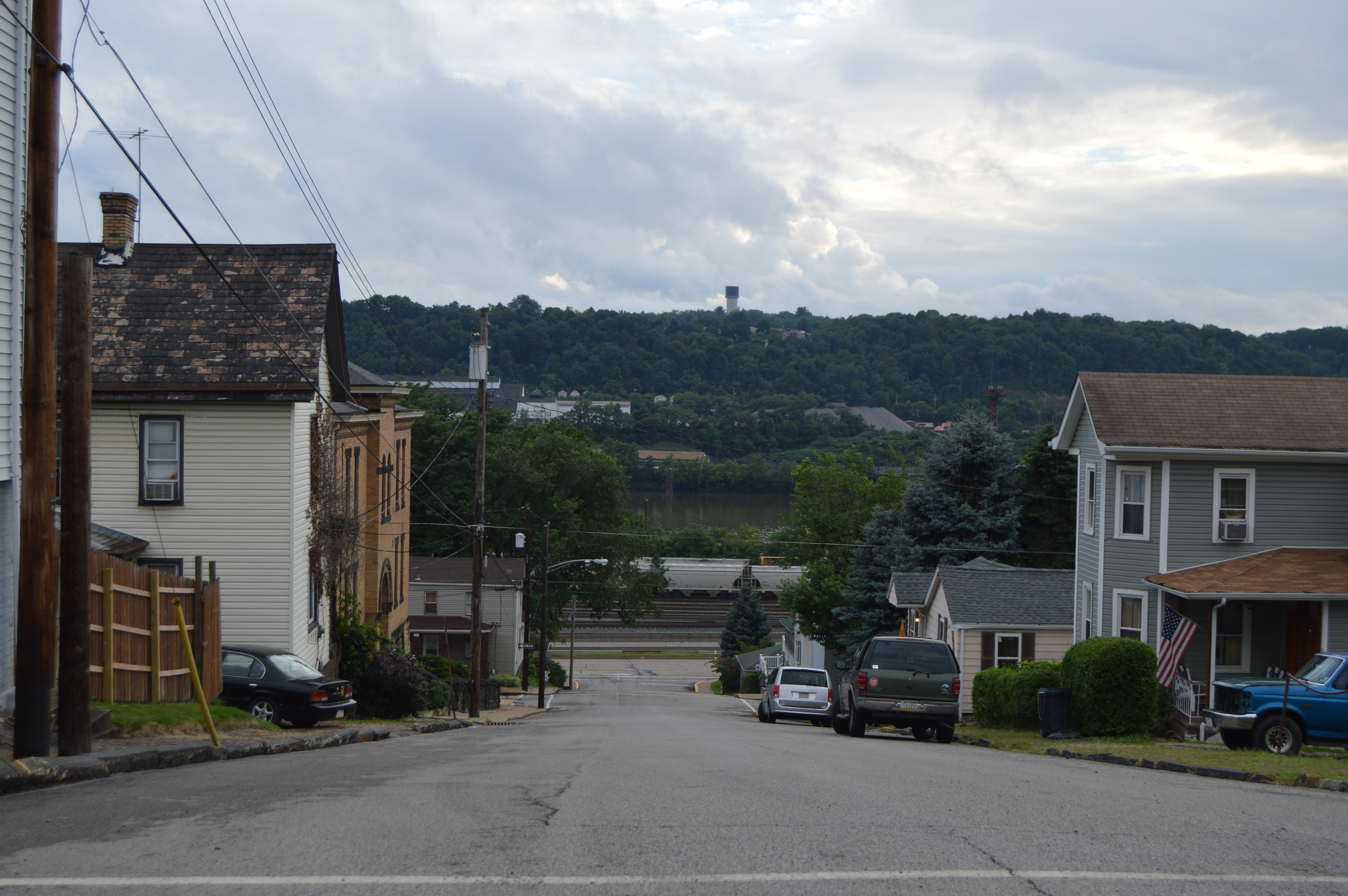
- Typical scene on one of the borough's steep streets, with the Conway Yard and the Ohio River visible in the distance
- Motto(s): Yours, Mine, Ours
- Interactive map of Freedom, Pennsylvania
- Location within Pennsylvania Location within the United States
- Coordinates: 40°41′04″N 80°15′06″W
- Country: United States
- State: Pennsylvania
- County: Beaver
- Settled: 1832
- Incorporated: 1838

Government
  - Type: Borough Council
  - Mayor: Nadine Padezanin

Area
  - Total: 0.74 sq mi (1.91 km^{2})
  - Land: 0.60 sq mi (1.56 km^{2})
  - Water: 0.14 sq mi (0.35 km^{2})
- Elevation: 827 ft (252 m)

Population (2020)
  - Total: 1,496
  - Density: 2,477.5/sq mi (956.56/km^{2})
- Time zone: UTC-5 (Eastern (EST))
  - Summer (DST): UTC-4 (EDT)
- Zip code: 15042
- Area codes: 724, 878
- FIPS code: 42-27712
- Website: www.freedomborough.org

Freedom is a borough in Beaver County, Pennsylvania, United States, along the Ohio River. The population was 1,496 at the 2020 census. It is 25 miles (40 km) northwest of Pittsburgh and is part of the Pittsburgh metropolitan area. Originally founded as a steamboat-building town, it later became known for producing oil and caskets in the 20th century.

== History ==
Freedom's establishment dates to 1832 when shipbuilders Jonathan Betz and Stephen Phillips, formerly based across the Ohio River in Phillipsburg, purchased a 101-acre tract from Abner Lacock. The company established a boatyard, and within a year, 14 homes were located in the settlement. South of Freedom was another village named Vicary, on the tract owned by William Vicary. The Captain William Vicary House remains a local landmark, and is listed on the National Register of Historic Places. In the 1870s, St. Clair borough was established between Vicary and Freedom, and the three communities consolidated into Freedom in 1896. Important businesses in the borough through the first half of the 20th century included Freedom Casket Company and Freedom Oil Company.

== Geography ==
Freedom is located at 40°41′4″N 80°15′6″W (40.684316, −80.251667). Freedom has three borders, including the borough of East Rochester to the northwest, New Sewickley Township to the east and northeast and the borough of Conway to the south. Freedom also runs adjacent with the borough of Monaca across the Ohio River.

According to the United States Census Bureau, the borough has a total area of 0.7 square miles (1.8 km^{2}), of which 0.6 square miles (1.6 km^{2}) is land and 0.1 square miles (0.26 km^{2}) (18.06%) is water.

== Demographics ==
Historical population
Census	Pop.	Note	%±
1840	384		—
1850	524		36.5%
1860	533		1.7%
1870	634		18.9%
1880	623		−1.7%
1890	704		13.0%
1900	1,783		153.3%
1910	3,060		71.6%
1920	3,452		12.8%
1930	3,227		−6.5%
1940	3,227		0.0%
1950	3,000		−7.0%
1960	2,895		−3.5%
1970	2,643		−8.7%
1980	2,272		−14.0%
1990	1,897		−16.5%
2000	1,763		−7.1%
2010	1,569		−11.0%
2020	1,496		−4.7%
2021 (est.)	1,479	▼	−1.1%

As of the 2000 census, there were 1,763 people, 687 households, and 469 families residing in the borough. The population density was 2,984.4 inhabitants per square mile (1,152.3/km^{2}). There were 731 housing units at an average density of 1,237.4 per square mile (477.8/km^{2}). The racial makeup of the borough was 92.80% White, 5.16% African American, 0.06% Native American, 0.23% Asian, 0.23% from other races, and 1.53% from two or more races. Hispanic or Latino of any race were 0.74% of the population.

There were 687 households, out of which 32.6% had children under the age of 18 living with them, 44.0% were married couples living together, 18.5% had a female householder with no husband present, and 31.6% were non-families. 26.9% of all households were made up of individuals, and 10.3% had someone living alone who was 65 years of age or older. The average household size was 2.56 and the average family size was 3.09.

In the borough the population was spread out, with 25.8% under the age of 18, 10.4% from 18 to 24, 29.0% from 25 to 44, 20.8% from 45 to 64, and 14.0% who were 65 years of age or older. The median age was 36 years. For every 100 females, there were 93.7 males. For every 100 females age 18 and over, there were 85.9 males.

The median income for a household in the borough was $30,741, and the median income for a family was $38,000. Males had a median income of $30,303 versus $23,438 for females. The per capita income for the borough was $16,261. About 12.2% of families and 14.5% of the population were below the poverty line, including 21.8% of those under age 18 and 8.6% of those age 65 or over.

== Education ==
Children in Freedom are served by the Freedom Area School District, which includes one elementary school, one middle school and Freedom Area Senior High School.

== Notable people ==
- Dominic DeNucci, professional wrestler
- Josh Sharpless, former Major League Baseball relief pitcher
- John Warhola, artist, brother of Andy Warhol who established The Andy Warhol Museum and the Andy Warhol Museum of Modern Art

== See also ==
- List of cities and towns along the Ohio River
