= James Warhola =

American artist (born 1955)

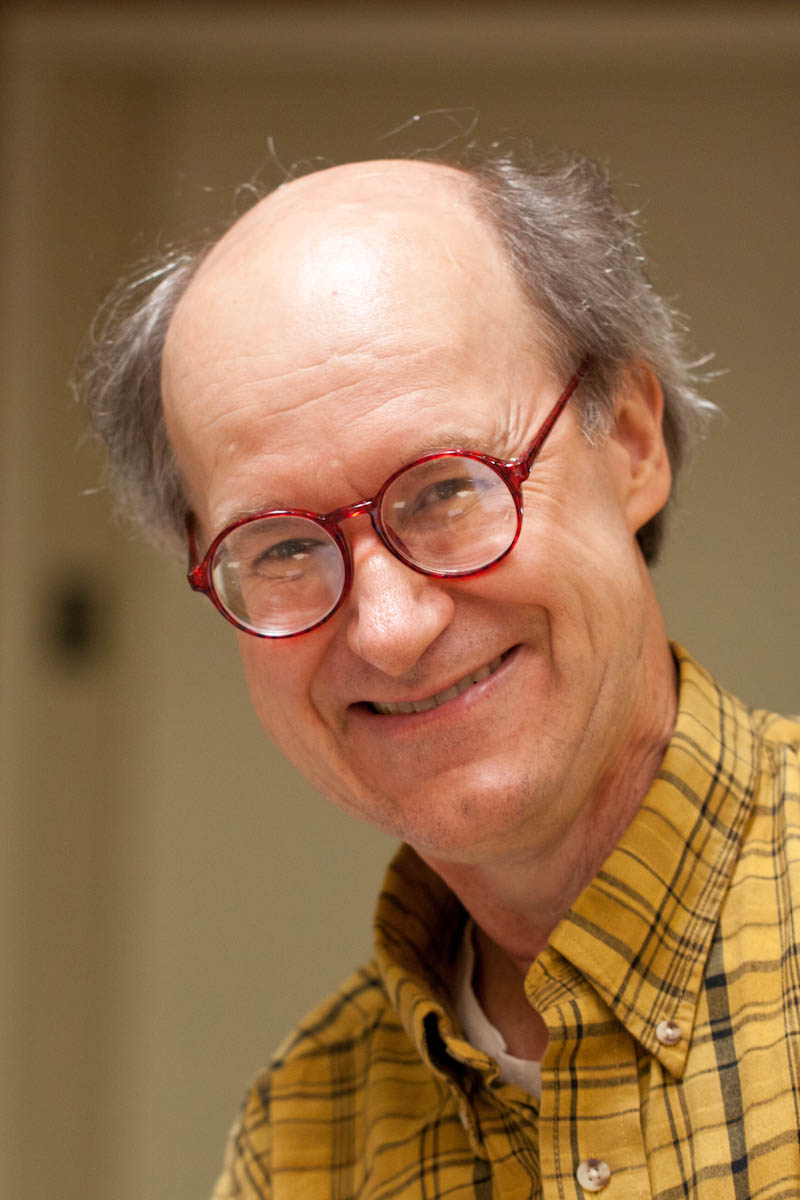
- Warhola in 2011
- Born: March 16, 1955 (age 70); Smock, Pennsylvania, U. S.
- Education: BFA, Carnegie Mellon University
- Known for: Illustration
- Notable work: Uncle Andy's: A Faabbbulous Visit with Andy Warhol
- Movement: Children's books, Science fiction
- Relatives: Andy Warhol (uncle); John Warhola (uncle); Julia Warhola (grandmother)
- Website: Official website

James Warhola (born March 16, 1955) is an American artist who has illustrated more than two dozen children's picture books since 1987.

== Early life ==
A native of Smock, a coal-mining region in Fayette County, Pennsylvania, near Pittsburgh, he is the son of Paul Warhola, Andy Warhol's oldest brother and the son of Rusyn immigrants from what is now Slovakia. Warhola received a BFA degree in design from Carnegie Mellon University in 1977. From 1977 to 1980 he studied at the Art Students League of New York with Jack Faragasso, then privately with Michael Aviano.

== Career ==
Warhola briefly worked for his uncle Andy Warhol at Interview magazine but left that job to become a science fiction illustrator, at which his uncle expressed his disgust in his diary.

As a science fiction illustrator in the early 1980s, Warhola did cover art for more than 300 books. Warhola is also one of Mad's "Usual Gang of Idiots," illustrating articles and covers for Mad.

Warhola has been a fantasy gamer and has done cover art for role-playing games and magazines like Different Worlds.

Uncle Andy's: A Faabbbulous Visit with Andy Warhol (Putnam, 2003)

He wrote and illustrated Uncle Andy's: A Faabbbulous Visit with Andy Warhol (Putnam, 2003) about his uncle. The book garnered much attention with a feature article in The New York Times and interviews on television and NPR. The publisher offered this description:

When James Warhola was a little boy, his father had a junk business that turned their yard into a wonderful play zone that his mother didn't fully appreciate! But whenever James and his family drove to New York City to visit Uncle Andy, they got to see how "junk" could become something truly amazing in an artist's hands ... Through James' eyes, we see the things that made his family visits memorable—including the wonderful disarray of Andy's house, waking up surrounded by important art and incredible collected objects, trying on Andy's wigs, sharing the run of Andy's house with his 25 cats (all named Sam), and getting art supplies from Andy as a goodbye present. James was lucky enough to learn about art from an innovative master, and he shows how these visits with Uncle Andy taught him about the creative process and inspired him to become an artist.

Horn Book commented, "In his debut as a writer, James Warhola uses a conversational style and childlike precision to describe one particular visit in 1962, when Warhol had recently made the transition from illustrator to fine artist. The watercolor illustrations are full of details." Uncle Andy's was also reviewed by Marianne Saccardi in School Library Journal:

Warhola, nephew of the artist Andy Warhol (who dropped the "a" from his last name early in his career), recounts his family's relationship with his famous uncle. Several times a year, he, his siblings, and his parents surprised Andy and his mother with a visit to their home in New York City. Warhol's house, always crammed with all kinds of things, including 25 cats, was a giant playground for the children. But the author's mother considered the place an untamed mess. To her "Gee, Andy, when you going to get rid of this stuff?" he countered, "Ohhh, no. This is art." And indeed, Warhola's text reiterates the theme that art is everywhere, a truth that his mother comes to realize in the end. The large watercolor illustrations usher readers into the New York City of the '60s, the streets crowded with tail-finned cars, the Automat and RKO Palace among the buildings lining the sidewalks, and a store window advertising pork chops for $.39 a pound. Boxes of Campbell's soup, paintings of Marilyn Monroe, Elvis, and other stars, and many other objects that eventually found their way into Warhol's art abound throughout his house, and a cutaway view of all five floors, with cats peeping out everywhere, will hold readers' interest. In spite of the artist's eccentricities, among them his wigs and his cats, the author's evident admiration for the man who invigorated his own artistic talent shines in this story.

In 2009 a spin-off book titled Uncle Andy's Cats was published. This told the story of how Andy Warhol's two cats had twenty five kittens and how he resolved the situation when he realized he had too many cats.

Warhola has worked for several major publishing houses, among them Warner Books and Prentice Hall. He serves as a consultant to the Andy Warhol Museum of Modern Art in Medzilaborce, Slovakia, near the Warhola ancestral village of Miková.

== Personal life ==
Warhola, his wife Mary Carroll, and their daughter, Oonagh Warhola, live in Tivoli, New York.
