= Wild Raspberries =

Satirical cookbook by Andy Warhol and Suzie Frankfurt

- Author: Andy Warhol & Suzie Frankfurt
- Illustrator: Andy Warhol
- Publisher: Seymour Berlin
- Publication date: 1959
- Publication place: United States
- Pages: 19

Wild Raspberries is an illustrated cookbook created in 1959 by American artist Andy Warhol and socialite Suzie Frankfurt. Produced before Warhol's rise as a leading Pop artist and Frankfurt's prominence as an interior designer, the book offers a satirical take on haute cuisine and gourmet culture, parodying mid-20th-century cookbooks through playful recipes and whimsical visuals.

Originally self-published in a limited edition of 34 copies, the book remained relatively obscure until it was reissued in 1997 by Little, Brown & Company under its Bulfinch Press imprint.

== Background ==
In 1959, while expecting her second child, Suzie Frankfurt encountered Andy Warhol's watercolors at Serendipity. Impressed by his work, she arranged a lunch meeting at the Plaza Hotel's Palm Court, with her husband, Stephen Frankfurt, acting as an intermediary. The meeting marked the beginning of a close friendship between Frankfurt and Warhol.

Going out for lunch and shopping together soon became a ritual. During one of their outings, Frankfurt suggested to Warhol that "we had to write a funny cookbook for people who don't cook." She later recalled that her mother, "a hostess sine qua non," had emphasized the importance of entertaining, inspiring her to follow suit just as French cookbooks were becoming fashionable. "I tried to make sense of them," she said. "'Make a béchamel sauce,' they'd say. I didn't even know what that was." This led to their collaboration Wild Raspberries, a playful homage to Ingmar Bergman's 1957 film Wild Strawberries.

== Content ==
The book was produced while Warhol was working as a successful commercial artist. Frankfurt wrote the text, while Warhol illustrated the recipes, with calligraphy provided by his mother, Julia Warhola. Frankfurt recalled, "So we did the book, Andy with his Dr. Martin's dyes and Mrs. Warhol, her calligraphy. She was gifted and untutored, and we left all the spelling mistakes. I wrote the recipes."

The project humorously exaggerated fine dining trends through absurd and impractical recipes, such as "Omlet Greta Garbo," which is "always to be eaten alone in a candlelit room", "Gefilte of Fighting Fish" ("immerse them in sea water and allow them to do battle until they completely bone each other. Take the fillets, stir in white wine and serve slightly chilled"), and "Seared Roebuck": "roebuck shot in ambush is infinitely better than roebuck killed after a chase."

== Publication ==
Wild Raspberries was self-published in a highly limited edition of approximately 34 copies and distributed to friends rather than widely sold. The manuscript contains 18 offset lithographs and a title page, printed by Seymour Berlin. Schoolboys were hired to color the pages, glossy paper was chosen for the covers, and the books were bound in fuchsia boards by rabbis on the Lower East Side. "There were two versions, colored and semicolored. We thought it would be a masterpiece and we'd sell thousands. I think we sold 20," Franklin said. A small number of copies were available through Serendipity, which operated as both a café and an informal gallery.

Owing to its limited circulation, the book remained relatively obscure for decades until it was reissued in 1997 by Little, Brown & Company under its Bulfinch Press imprint, a project initiated by Frankfurt's son, art dealer Jaime Frankfurt. Because of the scarcity of the original limited-edition books, they have become highly sought-after collector's items, with copies selling for over $40,000 at auction.
