= Suzie Frankfurt =

American interior designer (1931–2005)

- Frankfurt by Andy Warhol in 1980
- Born: Suzanne Allen; August 21, 1931; Los Angeles, California, U.S.
- Died: July 1, 2005 (aged 73); New York City, U.S.
- Occupation: Interior designer
- Spouse: Stephen Frankfurt (1956–1968)
- Children: 2

Suzie Frankfurt (née Allen; August 21, 1931 – January 7, 2005) was an American interior designer and socialite. Her work helped define an elegant, historically informed aesthetic in late 20th-century American interior design.

Frankfurt gained early recognition for redesigning the lobby of Young & Rubicam and became a celebrated decorator of Russian and Biedermeier antiques, popularizing 18th and 19th-century Russian furniture among affluent clients. Her clientele included Robert Redford and Robert Mapplethorpe, and her own Manhattan townhouse interiors were featured in Home & Garden and Architectural Digest. A friend and one-time collaborator of Pop artist Andy Warhol, she co-authored the tongue-in-cheek cookbook Wild Raspberries (1959) with him.

== Early life and education ==
Suzanne Allen was born on August 21, 1931, in Los Angeles, the daughter of Eva and Isidore Allen, who owned a linen distribution company. Through a cousin who married a son of industrialist Norton Simon, she became part of a well-connected extended family that included actress Jennifer Jones, Simon's wife, and Simon's sister, Marcia Weisman, a prominent art collector.

She graduated with honors from Stanford University in Stanford, California, before moving to New York.

== Career ==
Frankfurt began her professional life in New York with the help of her cousin-in-law, Norton Simon. In 1955, she joined the research department at the advertising agency Young & Rubicam, where she was assigned the task of redecorating the company's lobby and executive conference rooms in 1967.

Although she initially decorated only occasionally for friends, by the late 1970s Frankfurt had become a prominent interior designer, known for her distinctive use of vintage Russian furniture, Biedermeier antiques, and traditional European styles. "I like anything that's a little out of the ordinary," she said. "That's why I'll place an eighteenth-century marriage chest from Damascus under an eighteenth-century mirror, top it with a thirteenth-century Tibetan Buddha — and then flank the whole effect with two Japanese military chests."

Her clients included actor Robert Redford, photographer Robert Mapplethorpe, and producer Lester Persky, and Sotheby's furniture expert Thierry Millerand. David L. Paul, a Florida bank chairman who was convicted of fraud in 1993, was accused of having paid Frankfurt approximately $389,000 in bank funds to decorate his home.

Frankfurt was a close friend of Paige Rense, the editor-in-chief of Architectural Digest, and interviewed her at her New York townhouse for Andy Warhol's Interview magazine in 1977.

== Personal life ==
=== Marriage and children ===
In 1956, Frankfurt married Young & Rubicam art director Stephen Frankfurt; the couple had two children and divorced in 1968. Her son Jaime Frankfurt is an art dealer, and her second son Peter Frankfurt is in the film business.

=== Friendship with Andy Warhol ===
In 1959, while pregnant with her second son, Frankfurt saw an exhibition of Andy Warhol's watercolors at Serendipity in New York. Captivated by his work, she arranged to meet him for lunch at the Palm Court of the Plaza Hotel, with her husband, Stephen Frankfurt, serving as an intermediary. This encounter began a close friendship between Frankfurt and Warhol. "The only reason Andy liked me was because I was raised in Malibu with movie stars like Myrna Loy all around. I liked Andy because I'd always felt my whole life that I was an outsider. It may not be the fact, but it's how I feel. For some strange reason, I felt that I fit in with him," she later recalled.

Together, they later created the illustrated cookbook Wild Raspberries, with Frankfurt contributing the recipes and Warhol the illustrations, offering a playful satire of contemporary French cookbooks. Warhol's mother Julia Warhola did the calligraphy for the book. In 1997, Little, Brown & Company's Bulfinch Press reissued the book.

In the 1960s, Frankfurt distanced herself from Warhol because she couldn't "cope with the Factory scene. It was too horrible for me. I was trying to be an Upper East Side wife." She did not see him again until after he was shot in 1968. They remained friends until Warhol's death in 1987, and his diaries frequently mention Frankfurt. Among the diary entries are her and Warhol's partner, interior designer Jed Johnson, preparing his Montauk estate Eothen for prospective renters in July 1977; Warhol attending her baptism after her conversion to Roman Catholicism in February 1978; Frankfurt bringing fashion designer Gianni Versace to the Factory for his portrait in January 1980; and Warhol hosting a birthday lunch for her in August 1980.

=== Health issues ===
In 1974, Frankfurt’s parents died within 10 days of one another. She later recalled coping through heavy drinking and prescription drug use, saying, "I consoled myself in my garden with lots of gin and Valium." She subsequently entered Silver Hill Hospital, a private treatment facility in New Canaan, Connecticut, to detox from Valium. After her release, her drinking continued until 1976, when she was hospitalized following a fall at home that resulted in a broken collarbone. Reflecting on that period, Frankfurt joked that she could "write a book called Tipsy in the House." In 1997, she said she had been sober for 10 years, calling her sobriety "my greatest achievement, other than my sons."

=== Residences and collection ===
Frankfurt's five-story townhouse at 163 East 80th Street on Manhattan's Upper East Side, which she decorated herself, reflected her passion for collecting and eclectic interiors. Her friend Paige Rense described it as "an intensely autobiographical house. Literally dozens of early Andy Warhol drawings testify to a long friendship with the artist, while boiseries from Italy and Spain reflect a passion for travel." The entrance hall featured an 18th-century Chinese ancestor portrait overlooking a Burmese Buddha and a pair of mother-of-pearl-inlaid armchairs. There was an ornate Damascene marriage chest salvaged from Hetty Green's New York bank, while sculpted heads from various cultures were displayed on an 18th-century Portuguese gilt table. In the parlor, Art Deco chairs and a glass-and-steel table contrasted with Brazilian votive heads, an Egyptian-style daybed, and a 21st-Dynasty sarcophagus. The dining room contained an antique Baccarat crystal chandelier, Thonet chairs, two 18th-century paintings, and a 19th-century clock, while Warhol's 1950s shoe drawings lined an upstairs hallway.

Known for hosting celebrity-filled cocktail parties, Frankfurt's townhouse became as notable for its interiors as for its art collection. In 1974, she staged a widely publicized three-day garage sale, which she called "Garbage à la Rummage." Among the thousands of items offered were paintings, decorative arts, antiques, and Americana, including a Louis XVI terracotta garden figure, a Tiffany inkwell, a 45-star American flag, a 19th-century pine armoire, and a lavender-glass Coca-Cola bottle. Entertainer Peter Allen purchased an apothecary chest, a Baccarat ice bucket, and a thimble-shaped shot glass for $500. Frankfurt also sold designer clothing and accessories by Yves Saint Laurent, André Courrèges, Pierre Cardin, Sonia Rykiel, and Halston, as well as a crocodile Hermès handbag originally priced at $1,500 that sold for $500 to a friend. The sale included several fur coats, among them a mint-condition Lutetia mink from Bendel's that sold for $1,800.

In 1977, Frankfurt opened her home for public tours to benefit the Industrial Home for the Blind in New York.

Frankfurt regarded her next home, a five-story Georgian townhouse at 122 East 73rd Street, as her greatest creative achievement, calling it her own "Russia." Featured in the September 1985 issue of House & Garden, the townhouse was described as combining the "strangeness and sometimes austere formality" of Russian interiors with Italian "grace and elegance." The salon featured parquet ceilings inspired by Russian floor patterns, walls glazed after those of the former Mikhailovsky Palace in Leningrad, an 18th-century Russian inlaid sewing table, Russian chairs from around 1820, and andirons by William H. Jackson. The dining room combined early 19th-century Austrian Biedermeier cabinets with Italian Empire furnishings beneath a Belle Époque chandelier, while the bedroom featured a French flower chandelier, an 18th-century Sicilian center table, Italian Directoire chairs, and antique textiles.

By 1990, Frankfurt felt that her time in New York had come to an end and sold her townhouse to Edgar Bronfman Jr. She then moved with her two Bernese Mountain Dogs to a 1780 farmhouse in the Berkshires of Massachusetts. Featured in the September 1996 issue of Architectural Digest, the farmhouse retained its original pine floors, wood-paneled living room, five bedrooms, and six fireplaces. Frankfurt decorated it in her signature style with warm colors, oversized furniture, and personal objects, including her portrait by Warhol above the fireplace and a large hand sculpture on a coffee table. Outside, the white clapboard house was surrounded by stone walls.

== Death ==
Frankfurt died on January 7, 2005, due to complications from a brain tumor in the Hebrew Home for the Aged in the Bronx, New York. She was survived by her two sons and four grandchildren.
