= Captain William Vicary House =

Historic house in Pennsylvania, United States

- Capt. William Vicary House
- U.S. National Register of Historic Places
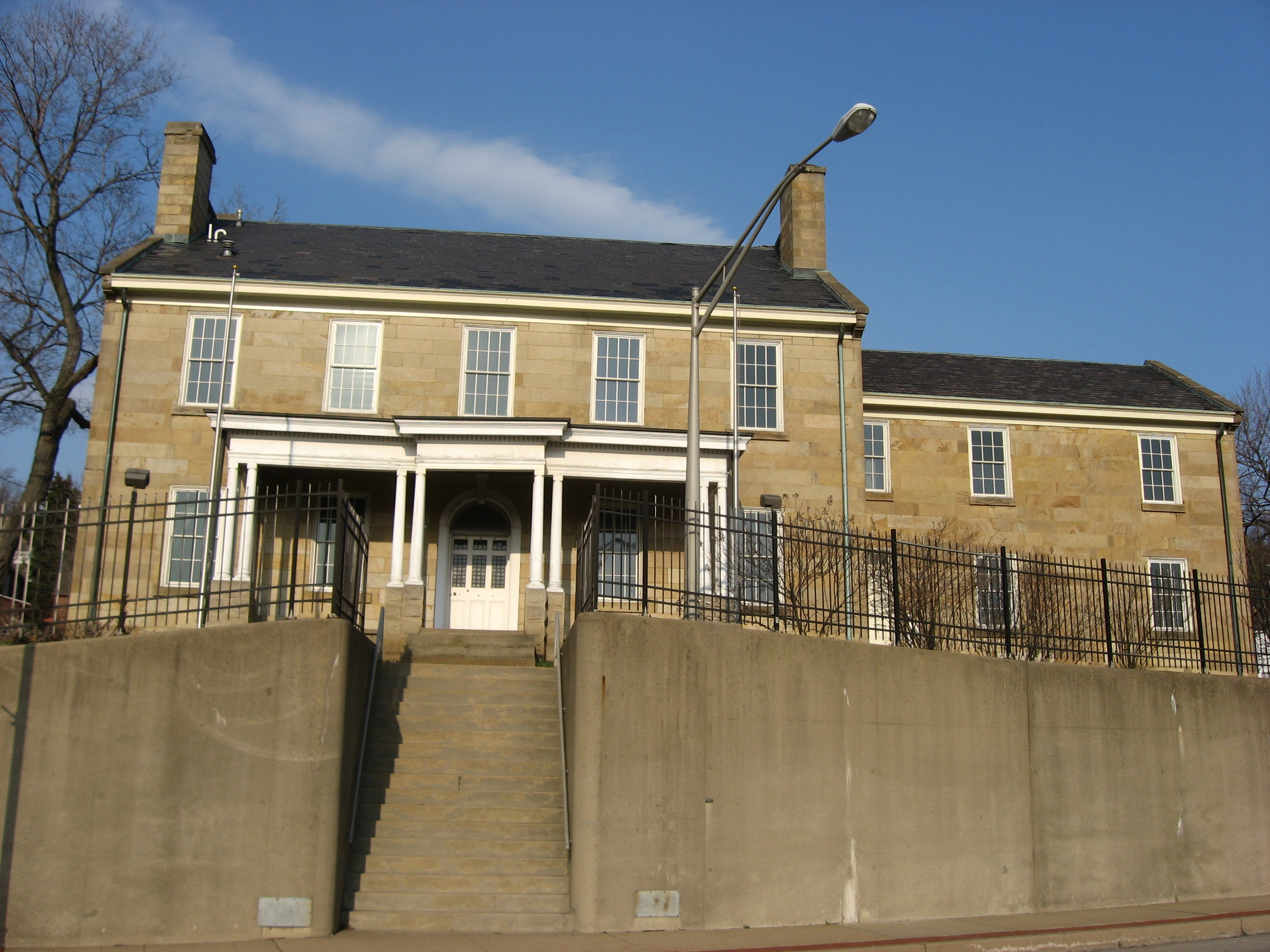
- Front of the Vicary House from Route 65

- Location within Pennsylvania Location within the United States
- Location: 1235 3rd Ave., Freedom, Pennsylvania
- Coordinates: 40°40′55″N 80°15′0″W
- Area: 5 acres (2.0 ha)
- Built: 1826
- NRHP reference No.: 74001749
- Added to NRHP: November 8, 1974

The Captain William Vicary House is a historic mansion in Beaver County, Pennsylvania, United States. Located at 1235 3rd Ave. in the borough of Freedom, the house lies along the community's main street above the Ohio River.

== Overview ==
A United States Navy captain during the War of 1812, Vicary was rewarded by the government for his services with 500 acres (200 ha) of land in the Northwest Territory. After settling in Sewickley, Vicary met members of the Harmony Society, which had recently established Old Economy Village along the Ohio below Pittsburgh. Consequently, Vicary bought 604 acres (244 ha) of land near Economy, where he platted a community called "St. Clair" and began to build a stone mansion in 1826. Vicary employed local builders to use locally mined sandstone to construct his house; it was completed in 1829 at a cost of over $4,000. Disputes with one of his builders led to a lawsuit that reached the Supreme Court of Pennsylvania and was not finally settled until after Vicary's death in 1842. Vicary's descendants lived in the house until 1912, but the house was not sold until 1924; after that date, it passed through a succession of owners before being condemned for the construction of Route 65 in the 1960s. A grassroots campaign resulted in its survival, and today the house is owned by Beaver County and occupied by the Beaver County Historical Research and Landmarks Foundation.

In 1974, the house was listed on the National Register of Historic Places for its architectural integrity. Significant aspects of the structure include its exterior and double chimneys; however, major modifications during the twentieth century included the removal of a large fireplace and the division of the house into apartments. The exterior stonework has been seen as particularly significant — the large stone blocks are believed to be the work of skilled masons, and are of a quality rarely seen in Western Pennsylvania in the early nineteenth century. A twentieth-century porch sits on the front of the mansion, and a cast-iron fence surrounds the property.

Today, the Vicary House is operated as a historic house museum.
