= Julia Warhola =

Mother of Andy Warhol (1891–1972)

- Юлія Варгола
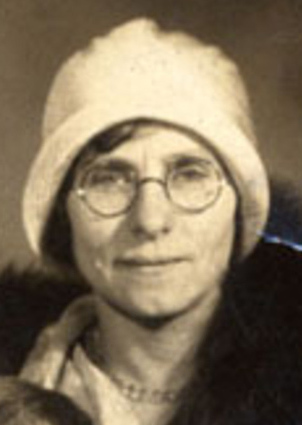
- Warhola, c. 1930
- Born: Julianna Zavacka; November 20, 1891; Mikó, Austria-Hungary
- Died: November 22, 1972 (aged 81); Pittsburgh, Pennsylvania, U.S.
- Resting place: Bethel Park, Pennsylvania, U.S.
- Spouse: Ondrej Warhola (m. 1909; died 1942)
- Children: 4, including John and Andy
- Relatives: James Warhola (grandson)
- Website: warhola.com

Julia Warhola (Note: Rusyn: Юлія Варгола, romanized: Iuliia Varhola, anglicized: Julia Warhola) (born Julianna Zavacka; (Note: Rusyn: Юлія Завацкій, romanized: Iuliia Zavaczky; Slovak: Júlia Zavacká) November 20, 1891 – November 22, 1972) was an American artist of Rusyn descent. She is best known as the mother of Andy Warhol, a leading figure in Pop art.

Born in Mikó, Austria-Hungary (present-day Miková, Slovakia), she emigrated to the United States, settling in Pittsburgh, where she raised her family. She later moved to New York City to live with her son and contributed calligraphy and decorative elements to his early commercial illustrations.

== Biography ==
=== Early life and ancestry ===
Julianna Zavacka was born on November 20, 1891, into a peasant family in the Rusyn village of Mikó, Austria-Hungary (now Miková in northeastern Slovakia). Her surname appears in various forms, including Zavaczky, Zavaczki, and Zavacka, and was later simplified to Zavacky in the United States. In her Hungarian-language birth record, her name is recorded as Julianna, while her family called her Ulia (Julia).

Her father Andrii Zavacky was a farmer. The Zavacky family had deep roots in Miková and were Greek Catholic Rusyns. While Julia's paternal family belonged firmly to the Rusyn community, her maternal ancestry was more diverse. Her mother, Justina Mrocsko, was Greek Catholic, though research indicates that her father, Mathias Mrocsko, was a Roman Catholic Pole from Galicia. Julia's maternal grandmother, Josephine Blau, was of Austro-German and Bohemian backgrounds and was also Roman Catholic, despite later family stories claiming Jewish ancestry. By the time Julia was born, however, the Mrocsko-Blau family had become assimilated into the local Rusyn community.

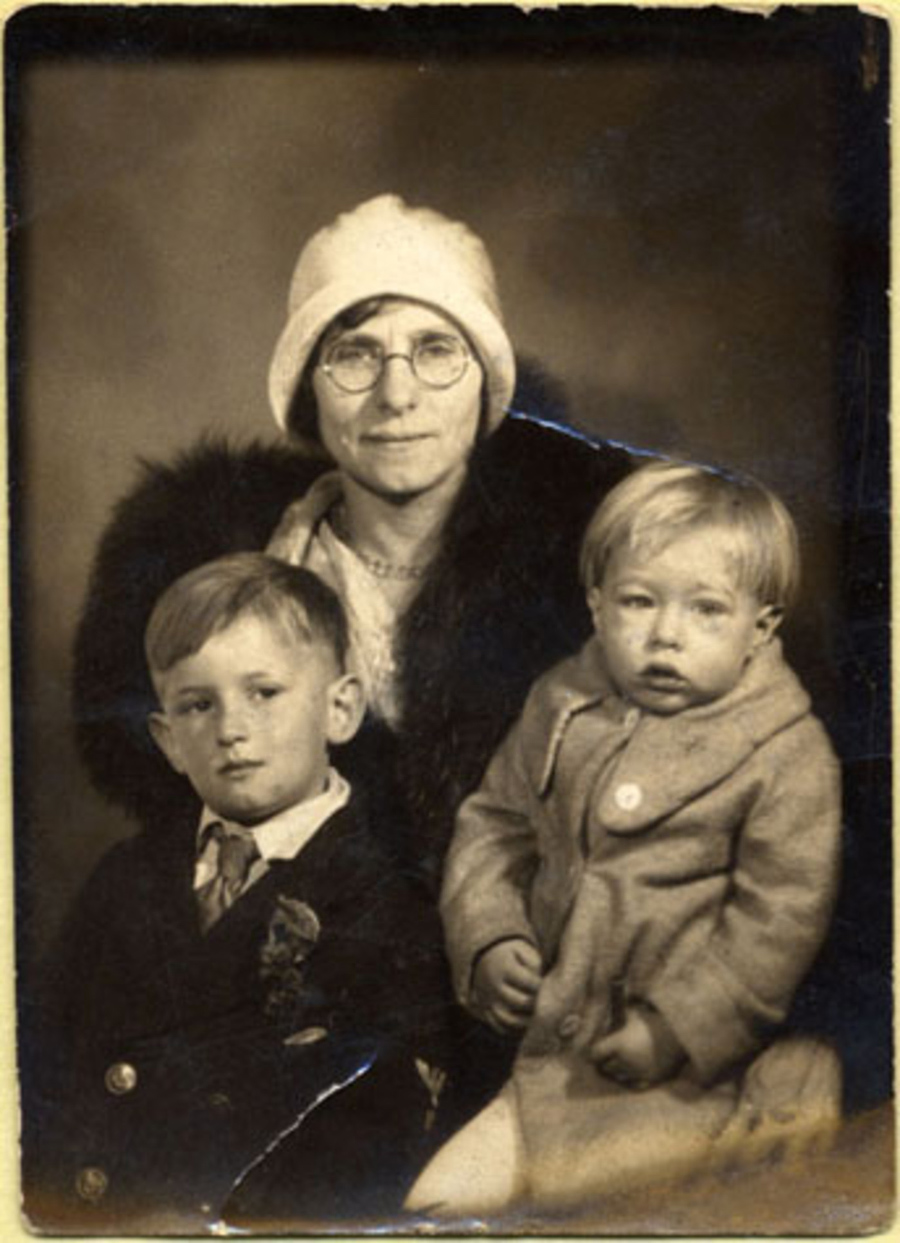
Warhola with her sons John (left) and Andy (right), c. 1930

"My Momma had fifteen children," Julia told journalist Bernard Weinraub. Parish records document fourteen children, including multiple deaths in infancy or early childhood, that reflected the harsh living conditions and poor sanitation common in rural Eastern Europe at the time. Of the children who survived to adulthood, three brothers—Stephen, John, and Andrew—and three sisters—Mary, Julia, and Anna—eventually emigrated to the United States, while a brother, Yurii, and sisters Elena and Eva remained in Europe.

At seventeen, she met her future husband, Andrew Warhola (Slovak: Andrej Varchola; c. 1886–1942). (Note: Many European-born Rusyns lacked official birth certificates, so exact birth dates were commonly uncertain. Church metrical books record Andrew Warhola’s birth as December 7, 1886, but various documents give differing information: his 1909 marriage record lists his age as 24 (not 22), the 1930 U.S. Census reports his age at marriage as 21, a 1913 insurance application gives 1887 as his birth year, and Julia Warhola told Esquire in 1966 he was 20 at marriage. By his 1924 naturalization he used 1886 but with a different month and day; his citizenship papers, draft card, death certificate, and tombstone show November 28, 1886.) Although she found him handsome, she felt too young to marry, but her father insisted. She later recalled, "My Daddy beat me, beat me to marry him. What do I know? The priest—oh a nice priest—come. 'This Andy,' he says, 'a very nice boy. Marry him.' I cry. I no know. Andy visit again. … He brings me candy, wonderful candy. And for this candy, I marry him." The couple married in 1909 in a three-day celebration that Warhola later remembered fondly, with music performed by seven gypsies.

In 1912, her husband left for Poland and subsequently emigrated to the United States to avoid conscription into the Austro-Hungarian Army. Their daughter, Maria, born on November 2, 1912, died a few weeks later, on December 4, reportedly from a cold due to the absence of a doctor in the village. Warhola remained behind, living with her parents-in-law and working in manual labor, including carrying potatoes. According to family lore, her husband attempted to send money for her passage to America, but it was repeatedly stolen en route.

=== Immigration to the U.S. and life in Pittsburgh ===
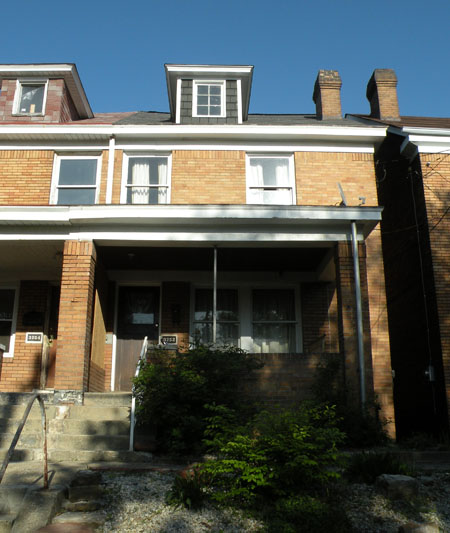
The Warhola family lived in this house from 1934 to 1960, at 3252 Dawson Street in Pittsburgh's South Oakland neighborhood

In 1921, Warhola was finally able to arrange her own journey with the help of a loan from a village priest. She left Czechoslovakia that year and joined her husband in Pittsburgh, Pennsylvania. The couple had three sons: Paul (1922–2014), John (1925–2010), and Andy (1928–1987). The family lived at several addresses in Pittsburgh, beginning in 1932 at 3252 Dawson Street in the Oakland neighborhood. They were Byzantine Catholic and attended St. John Chrysostom Byzantine Catholic Church.

Around 1939, the abdominal illness that Andrew Warhola had suffered from for years worsened. Julia Warhola later recalled that her husband had drunk contaminated water from a coal mine in West Virginia and returned home ill. Employment records corroborate this, showing that he missed several weeks of work that year and even more the following year. He sought treatment from "German doctors," who prescribed a "tea," and for a time his condition appeared to improve. Letters he wrote to his wife in March 1941 describe him back on the road and working again.

By May 6, 1942, however, he had been admitted to Montefiore Hospital, where he died nine days later. An autopsy identified the cause of death as tubercular peritonitis. Earlier that year, on April 9, 1942, Julia became a naturalized citizen of the United States. To support her children after the death of her husband, she worked cleaning homes and managed to save $11,000.

She was also skilled in embroidery and other crafts, including making bouquets from tin cans and crepe paper, which later inspired Andy's Campbell's Soup Cans. During the Easter season, she decorated eggs in the traditional Pysanka style.

=== Life and career in New York ===
Warhola was especially close to her youngest son, Andy Warhol. In 1952, she moved to New York City to live near him while he worked as a commercial artist. Warhola later told a journalist that she spoke limited English and "Andy no talk Slovak, but he understands" the language. She enjoyed singing traditional Rusyn folk songs at home and, during the 1950s, recorded folk songs, hymns, and prayers for her sons.

Like her son, she loved to draw, and her favorite subjects were angels and cats. He often used her decorative handwriting to accompany his illustrations, such as the book 25 Cats Name Sam and One Blue Pussy and Wild Raspberries. She also wrote and illustrated her own book called Holy Cats. Warhola was awarded a Certificate of Merit from the American Institute of Graphic Arts for designing the album cover for The Story of Moondog, featuring the musician Louis Thomas Hardin in 1957.

By the early 1960s, Andy had transitioned from commercial illustration to silkscreen painting and emerged as a leading figure in the growing Pop art movement. Warhola was featured in an article on the mothers of artists in the November 1966 issue of Esquire, in which she recounted her life story and discussed her son.

During this period, Andy also produced a number of experimental films at his studio, the Factory. In November 1966, he filmed The George Hamilton Story, also known as Mrs. Warhol, a 66-minute color film starring Warhola as "an aging peroxide movie star with a lot of husbands." Her latest husband was portrayed by Warhol's companion Richard Rheem. Warhola had become close friends with Rheem, who lived with her at Andy's townhouse on Lexington Avenue until December 1966. The film was not given a public viewing.

She attended Divine Liturgy at St Mary Byzantine Catholic Church on East 15th Street in Manhattan.

=== Illness and return to Pittsburgh ===
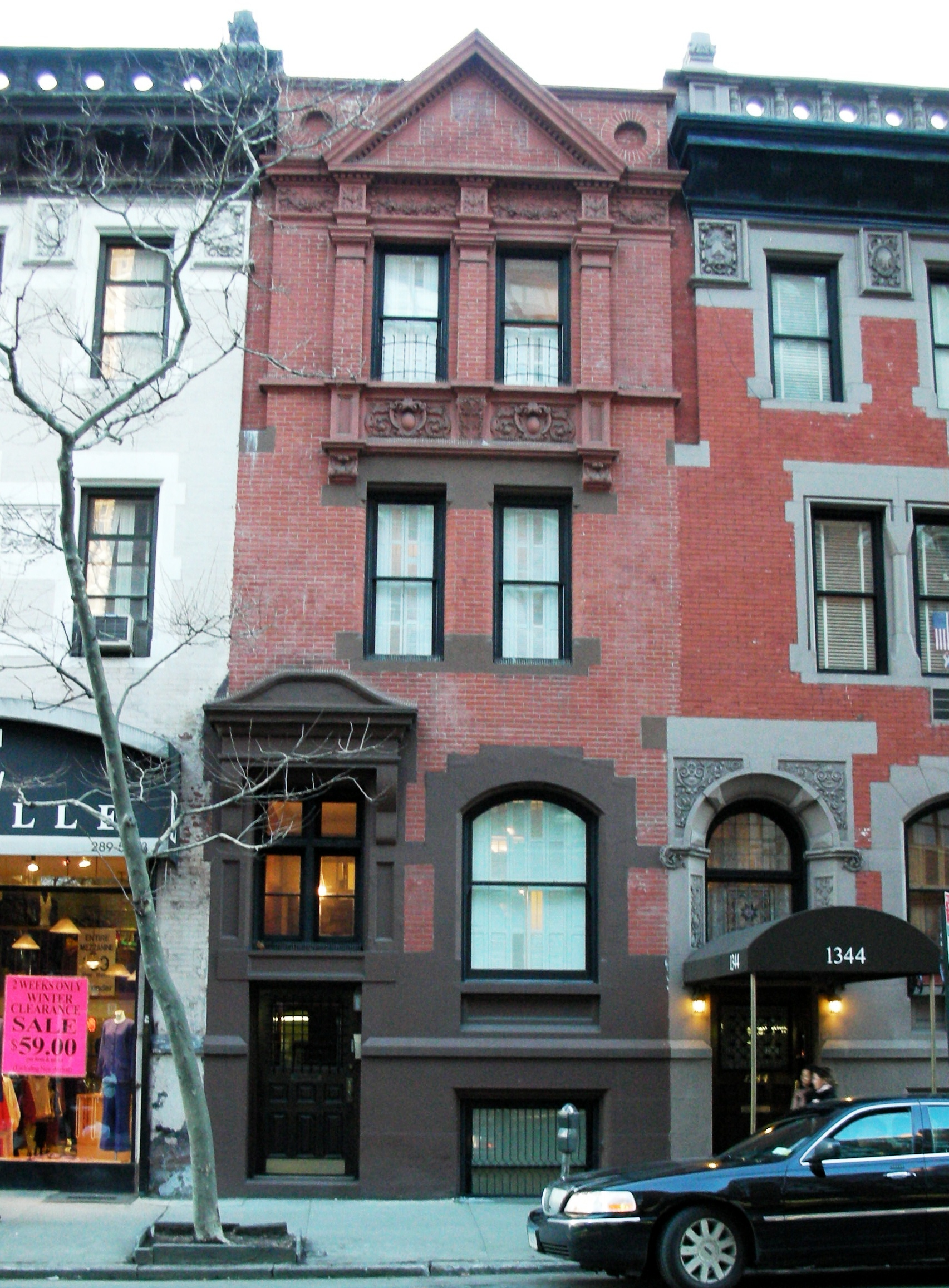
From 1960 to 1971, Warhola lived in the basement apartment of her son's townhouse at 1342 Lexington Ave in the Carnegie Hill neighborhood of Manhattan

After Andy survived a near-fatal shooting in June 1968, his boyfriend Jed Johnson moved into his Lexington Avenue townhouse to help him recover and look after Warhola. Warhola was in poor physical condition; she had heart problems, arthritis, and weak legs. Johnson brought order to the household and accompanied Warhola to her weekly doctor's appointments. "She got really senile and she would just go out and leave the door open, forget where she went. We were just afraid that she would get lost. Once, the police came," Johnson later recalled. "She was really difficult. She needed medication, which she didn't remember to take, and then she made a lot of demands but she didn't know what she was doing. I mean, she was like a bag lady. She had things stuffed in shopping bags and her whole bed was surrounded by shopping bags and she had things safety-pinned to her clothing," he added. Warhola believed the New York Fertility Center next door buried aborted fetuses there, and she complained that she could smell the stench of their decay, so she had Johnson move her bed away from the exposed brick wall.

By 1970, Warhola's health was rapidly declining, and Johnson believed she required full-time nursing care, though Andy Warhol opposed the idea. In February 1971, already affected by dementia, she suffered a stroke. Because of his demanding work schedule, Andy arranged for her to return to Pittsburgh to live with his brother Paul later that year. After a second stroke at Paul's home and a subsequent hospital stay, she was admitted to Wightman Manor nursing home in Squirrel Hill against Andy's wishes. Andy kept the decision from his associates at the Factory, and Johnson was instructed not to discuss it. Although Andy covered the cost of her care, he never visited her at the nursing home. Instead, he called her daily, during which she repeatedly pleaded with him to come see her.

=== Death ===
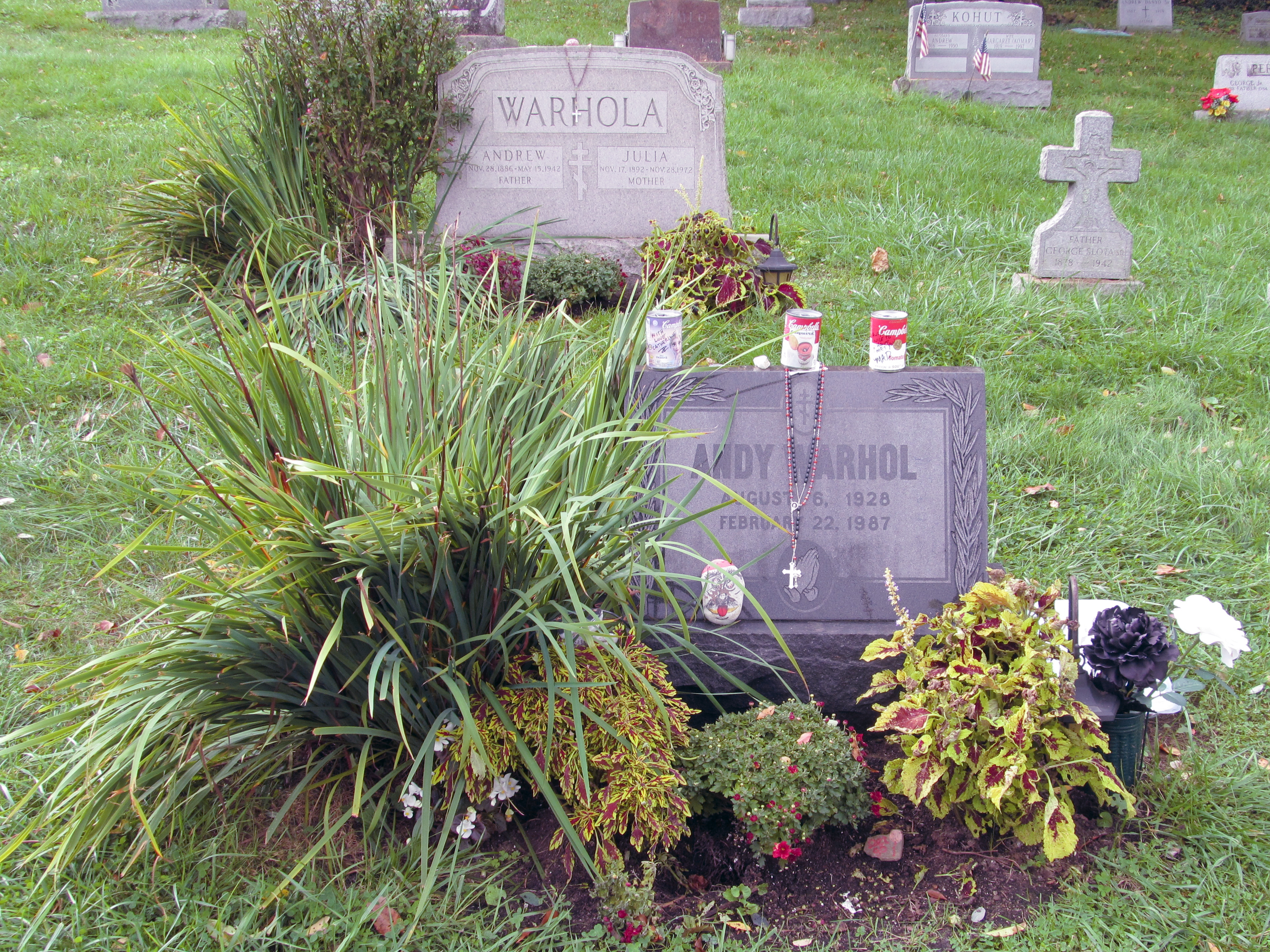
Warhol's grave behind her son's at St. John the Baptist Byzantine Catholic Cemetery in Bethel Park

On November 22, 1972, Warhola died at age 81 following a third stroke. Her funeral was held at the John N. Elachko Funeral Home in Pittsburgh. Andy did not attend her funeral, but he paid for all of the expenses. He kept news of her death private and reportedly told anyone who asked that she was shopping at Bloomingdale's. His longtime partner Jed Johnson learned of her death from one of Andy's brothers. According to his nephew George Warhola, a relative photographed Warhola in her coffin—a custom among older Carpatho-Rusyns—and sent the image to Andy, prompting Johnson to remark, "Your uncle was very upset about that."

In the years that followed, Andy felt remorseful about his inability to care for his mother. In a December 1985 diary entry, he said, "And at Christmas time I really think about my mother and if I did the right thing sending her back to Pittsburgh. I still feel so guilty."

Julia Warhola is buried with her husband Andrew at St. John the Baptist Byzantine Catholic Cemetery in Bethel Park, Pennsylvania, near their son Andy, who would be interred there in 1987. The birth year on Warhola's tombstone is given as 1892, but this is considered a reporting error by her family. Parish records indicate that she was born on November 20, 1891. Such discrepancies were common among east-central European immigrants, making ages difficult to verify. Church metrical books are considered the most reliable source.

== Legacy ==
Andy Warhol created posthumous portraits of his mother Julia in 1974. The portraits appeared on the cover of the Jan/Feb 1975 issue of Art in America. They were also displayed as part of his retrospective at the Whitney Museum of American Art in 1979.

Elaine Rusinko, a professor emerita of Russian language and literature at the University of Maryland, wrote the biography Andy Warhol's Mother: The Woman Behind the Artist, which was published by the University of Pittsburgh Press in 2024.
