= Absolut Warhola =

2001 film by Stanislaw Mucha

- Directed by: Stanislaw Mucha
- Written by: Stanislaw Mucha
- Distributed by: Pegasos Film; TLA Releasing (US)
- Release date: 2001
- Running time: 80 minutes
- Country: Germany
- Language: Slovak

Absolut Warhola is a 2001 German documentary film directed by Stanislaw Mucha about Andy Warhol's extended family, whom he never met, in rural Slovakia.

The film follows the filmmakers as they travel through eastern Slovakia to interview Warhol's surviving relatives, ethnic-Rusyns living near the Polish border in Miková, and to visit the Andy Warhol Museum of Modern Art in Medzilaborce. The museum is shown to be in a poor state, with the museum director and staff openly soliciting donations from the audience and giving out the museum's bank account details.

The living situation in the underdeveloped rural east of Slovakia prior to EU-membership is also shown. The film also notes the levels of homophobia still present in this part of the world, with several of Warhol's relatives openly criticizing the "rumours" of his sexuality (although his homosexuality is common knowledge in the West). One man even goes as far to suggest that Valerie Solanas, the radical feminist and misandrist who attempted to assassinate Warhol, was in fact a spurned former lover.
