= 25 Cats Name Sam and One Blue Pussy =

1957 artist's book by Andy Warhol

- Author: Andy Warhol
- Language: English
- Published: 1957
- Publisher: Self-published
- Publication place: USA

25 Cats Name Sam and One Blue Pussy is a privately printed, limited edition artist's book by the American artist Andy Warhol in 1957.

== Content ==
The book consists of 19 lithographs that were hand-colored with watercolor by the artist and his friends. His mother Julia Warhola did the calligraphy, and is responsible for the dropped "d" in the title, which Warhol chose to preserve.

Warhol's friend Charles Lisanby was given credit as the writer, although the book itself included no text. Lisanby recalled coming up with the suggestive title:

Oh, the cat book. It was so funny. There is no text. The text is the title, and I wrote the title, which was, I don't know, an amusing thing. He said, "What should I call it?" I just said that. So he wrote that down, which I think is funny... and he owned so many cats, and he loved to make these drawings. Even some of the cat things were drawn while looking at a book of photographs of cats that I have.

The original edition was limited to 190 numbered, hand-colored copies, using Dr. Martin's ink washes and his blotted line technique for the lithographs.

== Publication ==
The release of the book coincided with Warhol's exhibition of his illustrations at the Bodley Gallery in New York in 1957. Lisanby said that when "Andy would get his books published — the reason for publishing these books was to try to attract attention to himself as an illustrator or to whatever he thought he was doing in those days, as an artist."

== Legacy ==
Most of the limited edition were given by Warhol as gifts to clients and friends. Copy No. 4, inscribed "Jerry" on the front cover and given to Geraldine Stutz, was used for the Facsimile editions were published in 1987 (which reproduced the colors of copy 4) and 1988. Both facsimiles came in a slipcase with a volume of Holy Cats by Julia Warhola, a work she first created in the 1950s, advertising her own authorship as “Andy Warhol’s Mother.”

== Auction history ==
An original copy was auctioned in May 2006 for US$35,000 by Doyle New York.
