= Andy Warhol Museum of Modern Art =

Modern art museum in Medzilaborce, Slovakia

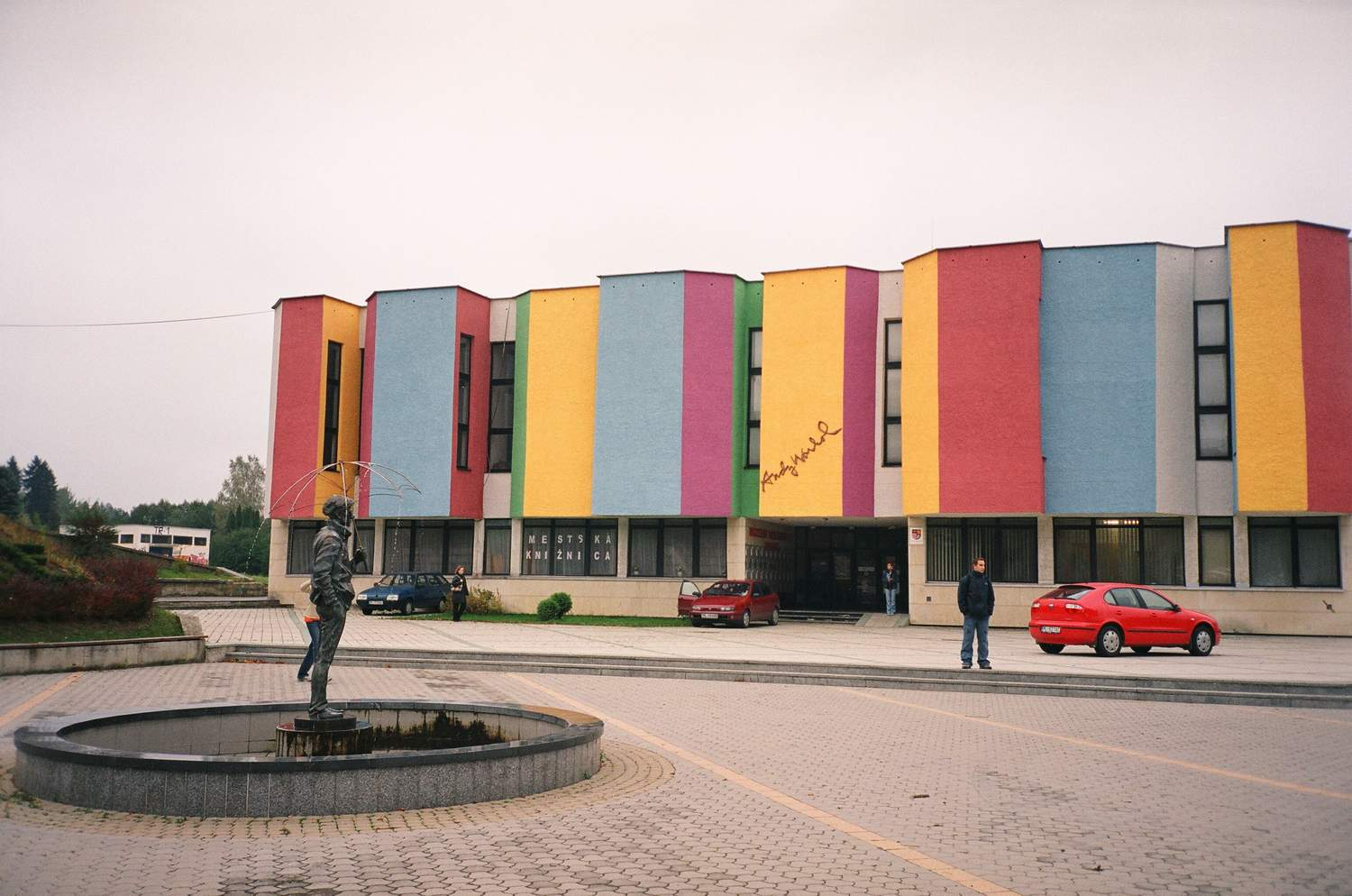
- View of the Andy Warhol Museum of Art façade, with Andy Warhol statue (left)
- Established: 1 September 1991
- Location: Andy Warhola 749/26, Medzilaborce, Slovakia
- Coordinates: 49°16′15″N 21°54′15″E
- Type: Art museum
- Director: Martin Cubjak
- Website: muzeumaw.sk/en

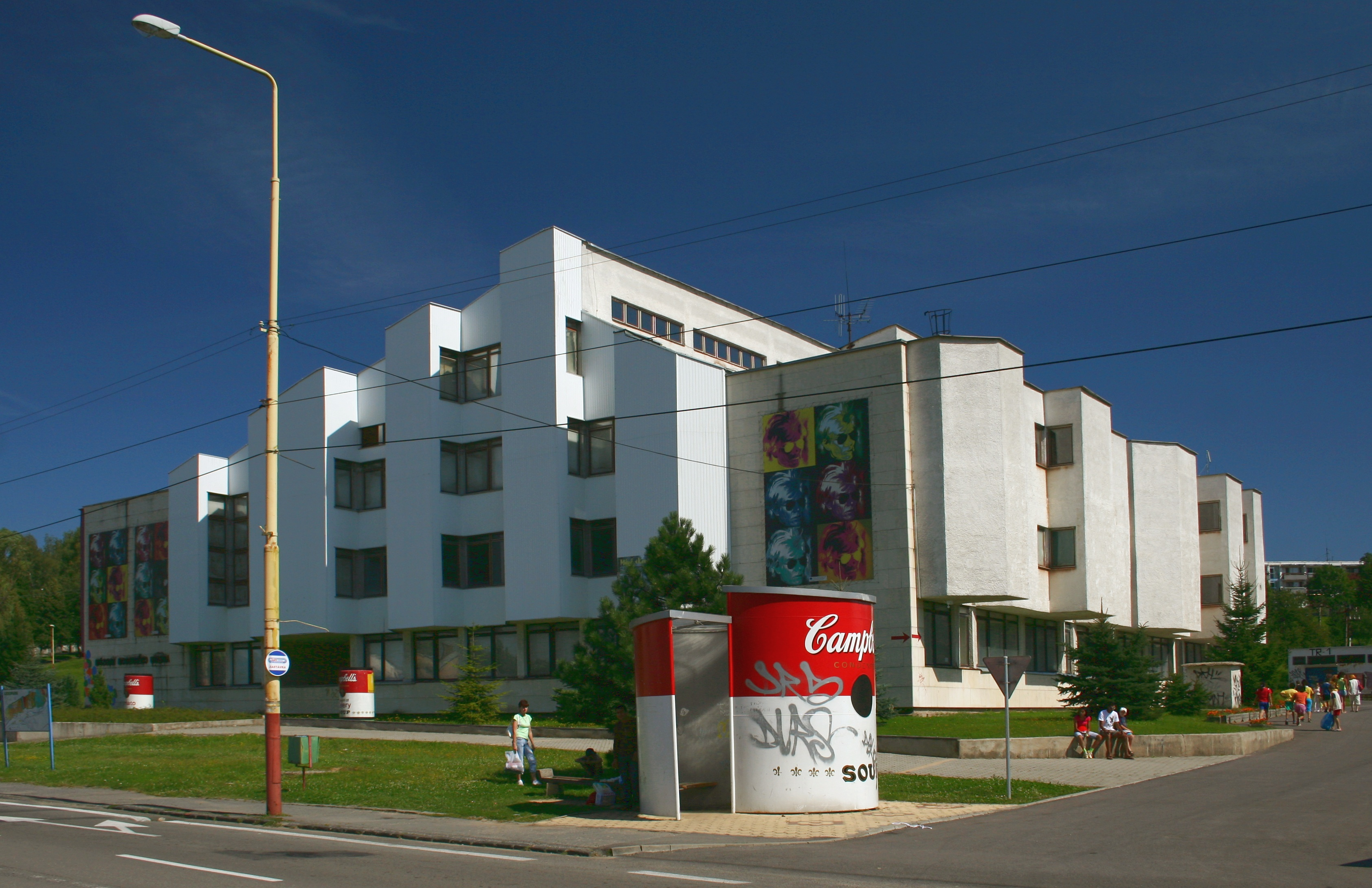
View of museum in 2008 with large Campbell's Soup Cans.

The Andy Warhol Museum of Modern Art (Slovak: Múzeum Andyho Warhola Medzilaborce; Múzeum Moderného Umenia Andyho Warhola) is a biographical museum in Medzilaborce, Slovakia, dedicated to the work and family origin of the American artist Andy Warhol.

== History and activities ==
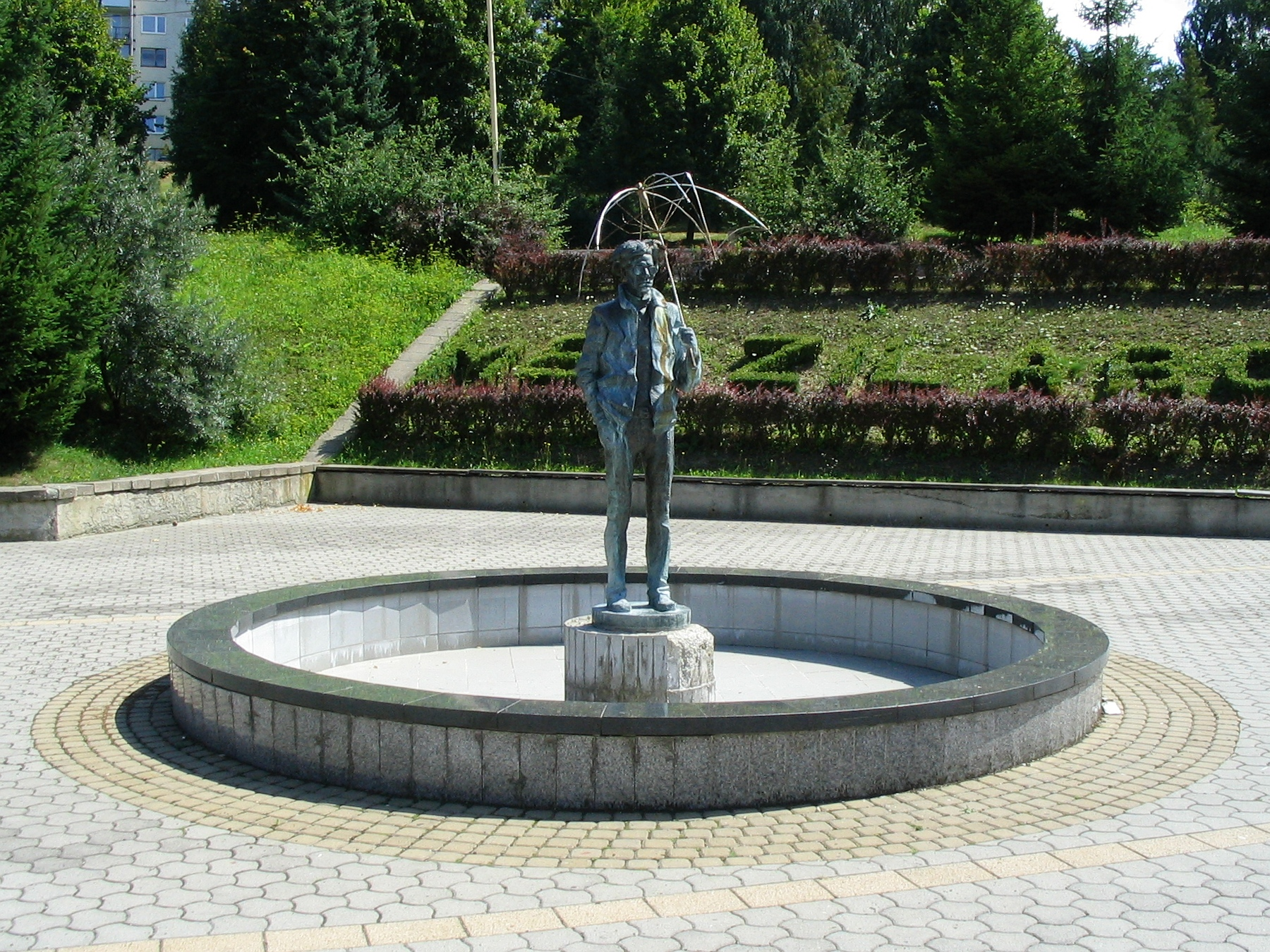
Monument to Andy Warhol (2002), by Juraj Bartusz

The museum was founded on 1 September 1991, as a joint initiative of John Warhola, brother of the late Andy Warhol, Dr. Michal Bycko, Fred Hughes and Vladimír Protivňák, as well as by the Andy Warhol Foundation for the Visual Arts, in New York, and the Ministry of Culture of Slovakia.

On 9 September 1991, the first 13 original works of Warhol were brought to the museum, accompanied by Jay Shriver, Warhol's assistant and a member of the Andy Warhol Foundation for the Visual Arts. A large post office building from the Communist era was adapted to be the biographical museum. On 5 October 1991, the grand opening of the museum took place with the exhibition "Andy Warhol in the Country of His Parents", attended by John Warhol and Ladislav Snopko, the Slovak Minister of Culture. The original name of the museum, The Warhol Family Museum of Modern Art, was changed to the current name in 1996.

On 1 April 2002, the Prešov Self-Governing Region joined the founding members of the museum. On 16 November 2002, a monument to Warhol, consisting in a 230 cm statue, created by Juraj Bartusz, was unveiled on the square in front of the museum.

A plaque dedicated to John Warhol was unveiled to celebrate the museum's 20th anniversary in 2011. In 2016, the Andy Warhol Museum of Modern Art celebrated its 25th anniversary, with a visit by Warhol's nephew, Donald Warhol, and his family.

== Collections ==
The museum collections are divided in three parts. The first one is dedicated to Warhol's origin and family. It presents the works created by Warhol's brothers, Paul Warhola, and by his son James Warhola. Paul was an amateur artist, while James was a professional artist and illustrator.

The first part also contains documents related to Warhol's origins; documents that attest the artist's Ruthenian roots, since his mother and father, Andrew and Juliet Warhol, born Warhola, were from the village of Miková, near Stropkov, in the north-east of Slovakia, then Czechoslovakia. Among the most valuable artifacts in this exhibition is the shirt where the sons of Julia and Andrej Warhol – Paul, John and Andy – were baptized. Visitors can see Andy's personal belongings here – a camera, a cassette player, sunglasses, a prayer book and clothing. The exhibition is complemented by a document from the signature campaign for the establishment of the museum organized by Michal Cihlář and Aleš Najbrt in 1989, which was signed by many personalities of political and cultural life, such as Václav Havel and Milan Knížák, among others.

The second section of the museum presents the works by Andy Warhol, that were loaned to the museum by the Andy Warhol Foundation for the Visual Arts, and also from private collections, or that are property of the museum. Visitors can perceive the conceptual idea of the exhibition in the spirit of pop art. The artworks are installed in continuity with the wallpapered walls, while acting in symbiosis forming a single visual whole.

The exhibition is conceptually designed to encompass all the artist's creative periods, including his dominant artistic themes, such as death, art for the sake of art, and portraits of famous personalities. On display there are some of his most famous works such as from the series of Campbell's Soup, Marilyn Monroe, Camouflage, etc. In total, the museum has 160 permanent artworks and artifacts by the artist. The exhibition documents all the creative periods of Warhol; most of the works exhibited where created with the silkscreen process. Among the most important paintings, there are portraits of Mick Jagger (1975), Lillian Carter (1977), Kimiko Powers (1981), Ingrid Bergman (1983), Mildred Scheel (1980), Saint Apollonia (1984), Theodore Roosevelt (1986), Hans Christian Andersen (1987), among others. Among the works dealing with communist themes are the paintings Hammer and Sickle (1976) and Red Lenin (1987).

The museum's newest exhibition is called "Street art vs. Pop art". It presents the works of prominent artists who knew Warhol personally, were influenced by his work, or followed his artistic legacy, such as Roy Lichtenstein, Robert Indiana, Jean-Michel Basquiat and Keith Haring.

The exhibition is complemented by poster compositions from workshops inspired by street art of Jitka Kopejtková, a Prague photographer and artist. On display there is also a graphic composition by Slovak artist Radek Repický. The exhibition is completed by the film Banksy – Exit Throught The Gift Shop, which is a probe into the lives of street artists.

== Popular culture ==
The museum features prominently in the documentary Absolut Warhola (2001), directed by Stanislaw Mucha, dedicated to Warhol's extended Slovak family.

== See also ==
- The Andy Warhol Museum, located in Warhol's native Pittsburgh, United States.
- List of single-artist museums

== Bibliography ==
- Gruber, Ruth Ellen (1993). "Warhol Pops Up in Carpathia". The New York Times.
