= Stephen Frankfurt =

American artist and business executive (1931–2012)

- Born: Stephen Owen Frankfurt; December 17, 1931; Manhattan, New York City, US
- Died: September 28, 2012 (aged 80); The Bronx, New York City, US
- Education: Pratt Institute
- Occupations: Graphic designer, business executive
- Spouse: Suzie Frankfurt (1956–1968)
- Children: 6

Stephen Owen Frankfurt (December 17, 1931 – September 28, 2012) was an American graphic designer and advertising executive. He was president of Young & Rubicam and created advertisements for films.

== Biography ==
Frankfurt was born on December 17, 1931, in Manhattan, to lawyer Milton Frankfurt and his wife, Blanche Frankfurt. He attended the High School of Music & Art, then the Pratt Institute in 1956; he later earned a doctorate in 1975 and became a board member.

During and after college, Frankfurt painted backgrounds for United Productions of America. In 1957, he was hired to Young & Rubicam as an artist, becoming president at age 36, its youngest and first from the art department. Under his leadership, the firm created commercials for Band-Aid, Eastern Air Lines, Excedrin, Johnson's Baby, and Lay's, among other companies. The firm also created public service announcements, such as for Partnership for a Drug-Free America, the Peace Corps, and the President's Committee on Mental Retardation. In 1958, he served as Art Kane's assistant while photographing A Great Day in Harlem. Frankfurt's commercials were often abstract, with him describing television advertising as "a toy then". He resigned as president after four years in the position. In 1971, he founded his own firm, and in 1988, joined Frankfurt Gips Balkind, working with Philip Gips. He encouraged Gips to create film posters. In 1983, he was inducted into the Art Directors Club Hall of Fame.

Frankfurt also worked in the film industry, creating title sequences and advertisements. He produced the title sequence for To Kill a Mockingbird, later working on Alien, Emmanuelle, Kramer vs. Kramer, Network, Rosemary's Baby, Superman, and That's Entertainment!. He worked on over 55 films throughout his career.

In 1956, Frankfurt married interior designer Suzie Allen, having two children together; they divorced in 1968. In 1969, he married Kay Gadda, having four children together. He lived in Quiogue, New York and was a neighbor of journalist Anderson Cooper; by 2010, he and his wife were attempting to sell the property, for $10.8 million. He died on September 28, 2012, aged 80, in the Bronx, from Alzheimer's disease.
