= John Warhola =

Andy Warhol's brother, trustee of his foundation (1925–2010)

John Warhola (May 31, 1925 – December 24, 2010) was an American businessman who played a pivotal role in maintaining the legacy of his younger brother, pop artist Andy Warhol. He had been assigned responsibility by their father on his deathbed to ensure that Andy attended college. Warhola served as a trustee of the Andy Warhol Foundation for the Visual Arts after his brother's death in 1987. He also oversaw the establishment of The Andy Warhol Museum in Pittsburgh and the Andy Warhol Museum of Modern Art in Medzilaborce, Slovakia.

== Biography ==
Warhola was born May 31, 1925, in Pittsburgh. He was the second of three surviving sons of Andrej and Julia Warhola. The Warholas were Rusyn immigrants from Mikó, Austria-Hungary (later known as Miková in northeast Slovakia). Shortly before his death in 1942, Warhola's father asked him to take responsibility for Andy's college education. He reportedly said, "Your role is to take care of Andy and make sure he goes to school, because he's going to be successful someday". Warhola attended vocational school himself and used the proceeds of savings bonds that his father had set aside to pay for Andy's first two years at the Carnegie Institute of Technology. He used the money he earned at a series of jobs to pay for Andy's final two years in college.

After Andy Warhol graduated from college and moved to New York City, Warhola kept in touch with his brother on a regular basis, calling him weekly until his death. As part of Andy Warhol's will, Warhola was named as one of the trustees of an organization that would support the arts. As vice president of the foundation for two decades, Warhola helped oversee the creation of museums dedicated to Warhol's work in their native Pittsburgh and in the area of Slovakia where his parents had grown up. Established in 1991, the Andy Warhol Museum of Modern Art was given some two dozen works of Warhol, as well as other pieces created by the eldest Warhola brother, Paul. Warhola was an active participant at The Andy Warhol Museum located in Pittsburgh's North Side neighborhood, often speaking with children visiting the museum about his brother's work.

A resident of Freedom, Pennsylvania, Warhola died at Allegheny General Hospital in Pittsburgh at the age of 85 due to pneumonia on December 24, 2010.
