= St. John the Baptist Byzantine Catholic Cemetery =

Cemetery near Pittsburgh, Pennsylvania, U.S.

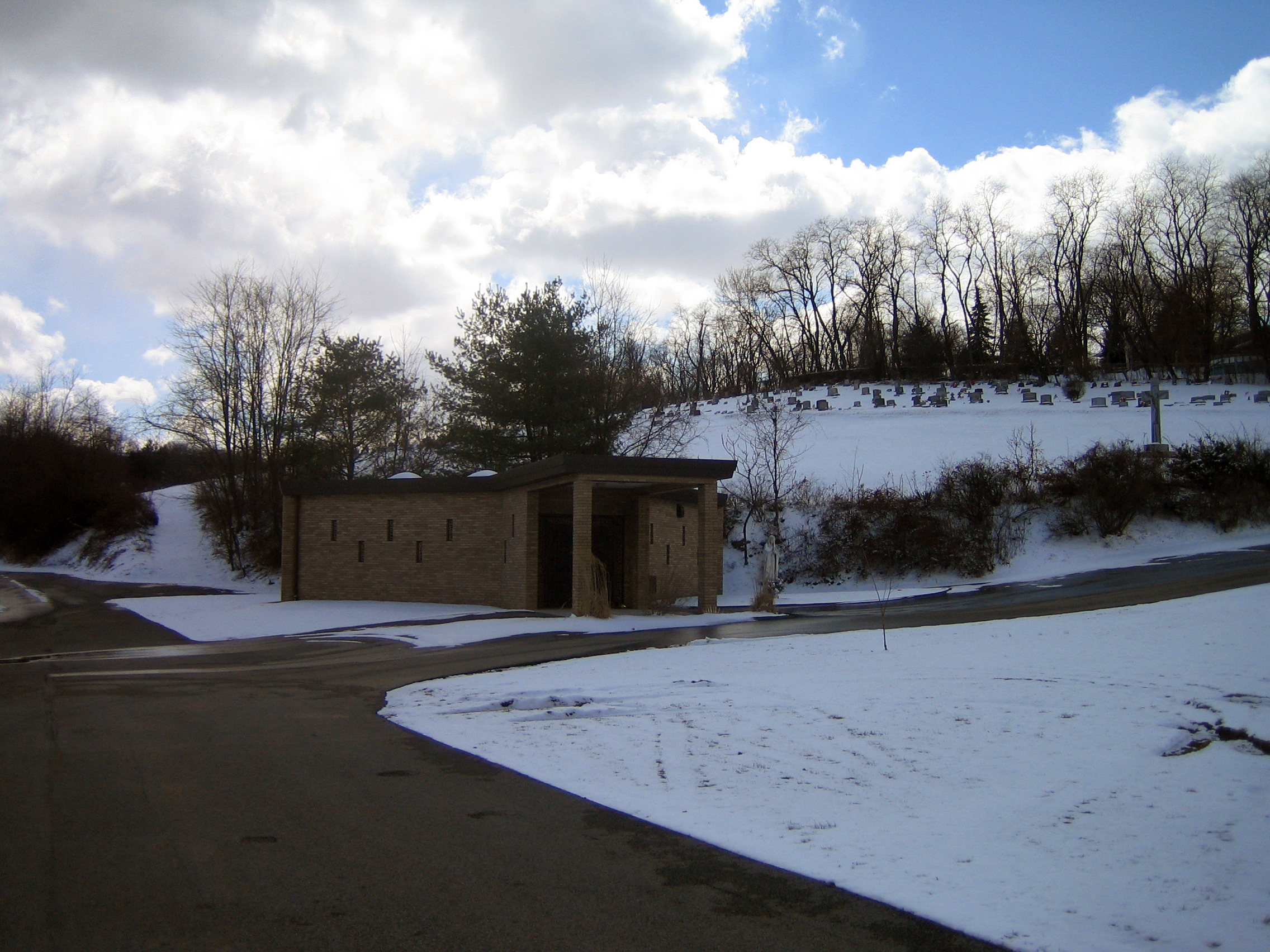
- Connor Road cemetery entrance
- Interactive map of St. John the Baptist Byzantine Catholic Cemetery

Details
- Established: 1923
- Location: Bethel Park, Pennsylvania
- Country: United States
- Coordinates: 40.3545°N 80.0294°W
- Size: 20 acres (8.1 ha)
- Find a Grave: St. John the Baptist Byzantine Catholic Cemetery

St. John the Baptist Byzantine Catholic Cemetery is an Eastern Catholic cemetery in Bethel Park, Pennsylvania, United States, a suburb approximately 5 mi (8.0 km) south of downtown Pittsburgh. It is situated on a hillside in the southwest corner of the intersection of Connor Road and Pennsylvania State Route 88.

As an ethnic parish cemetery, it primarily serves members of St. John the Baptist Ruthenian Greek Catholic Church on Pittsburgh's South Side, as well as others of Rusyn and Ukrainian descent from the Byzantine Catholic Metropolitan Church of Pittsburgh.

The cemetery was established in 1923 when the church bought a 20-acre (8.1 ha) farm in a rural part of Allegheny County. Since then, suburban growth has spread to meet the graveyard. The Commonwealth of Pennsylvania took part of the cemetery grounds to expand Connor Road, and the Port Authority of Allegheny County annexed more of its land for a trolley station.

== Notable interments ==
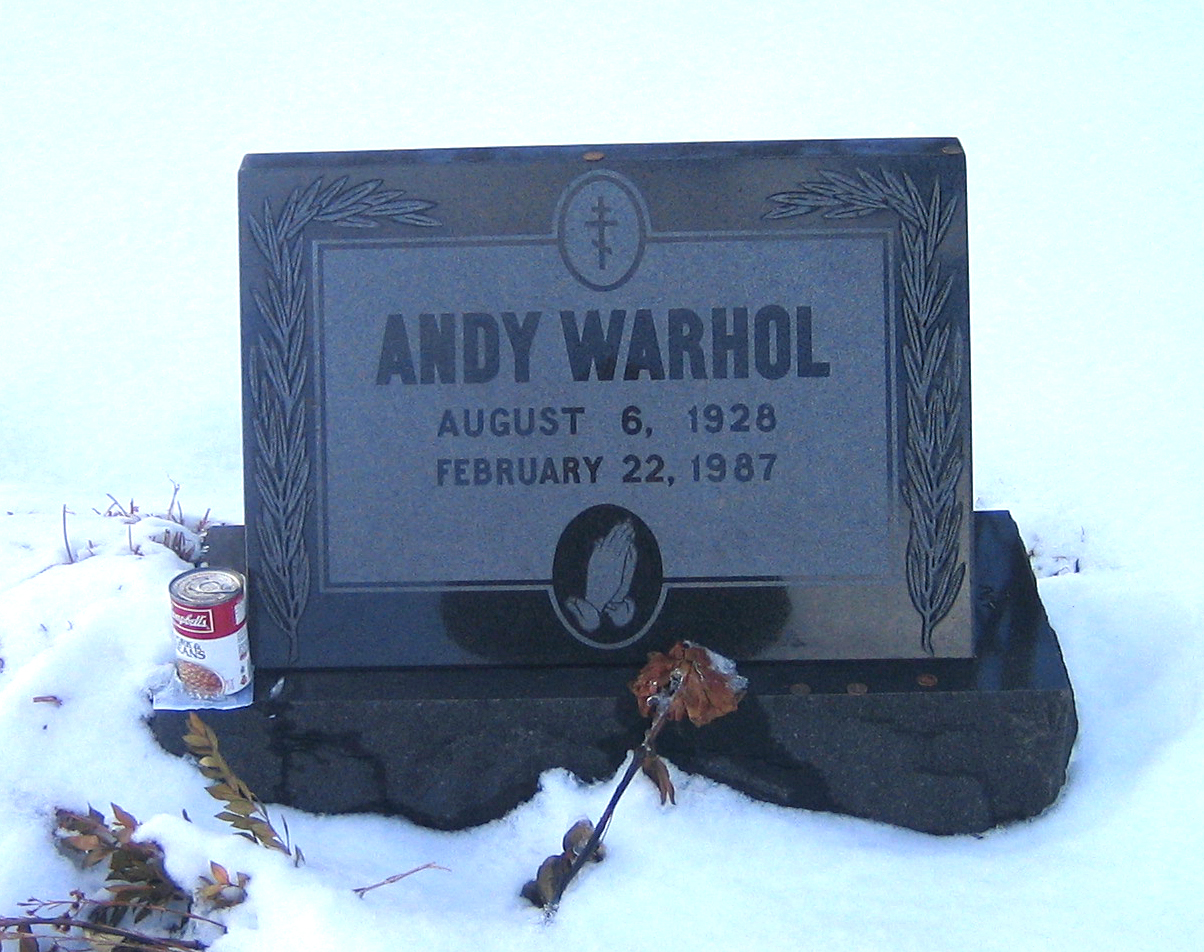
The grave site and tombstone of Andy Warhol

The cemetery is best known as the burial site of the American artist Andy Warhol and his parents. Warhol's fans make pilgrimages to this cemetery and leave tokens including cans of soup on his grave stone to honor his life.

== See also ==
- List of cemeteries in the United States
