= Miková =

- Municipality
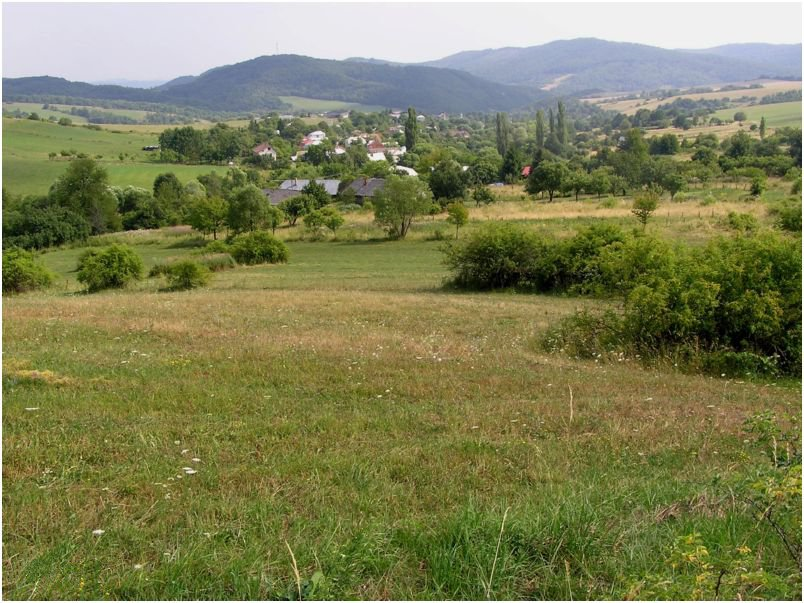

- Flag

- Location of Miková in the Prešov Region Location of Miková in Slovakia
- Coordinates: 49.30°N 21.83°E
- Country: Slovakia
- Region: Prešov Region
- District: Stropkov District
- First mentioned: 1390

Government
  - Mayor: Ľudmila Petrušková (KDH)

Area
  - Total: 12.71 km^{2} (4.91 sq mi)
- Elevation: 369 m (1,211 ft)

Population (2025)
  - Total: 131
- Time zone: UTC+1 (CET)
  - Summer (DST): UTC+2 (CEST)
- Postal code: 902 4
- Area code: +421 54
- Vehicle registration plate (until 2022): SP
- Website: www.mikova.sk

Miková (Rusyn: Микова; Hungarian: Mikó) is a village and municipality in Stropkov District in the Prešov Region of north-eastern Slovakia.

== History ==
In historical records the village was first mentioned in 1390. It was known as Mikova until 1899.

The village is perhaps best known as the ancestral village of the American artist Andy Warhol, whose parents both emigrated from Miková in the early 20th century.

== Geography ==
The municipality lies at an altitude of 369 metres (1,211 ft) and covers an area of 12.71 km^{2} (4.91 sq mi) (2025).

== Population ==
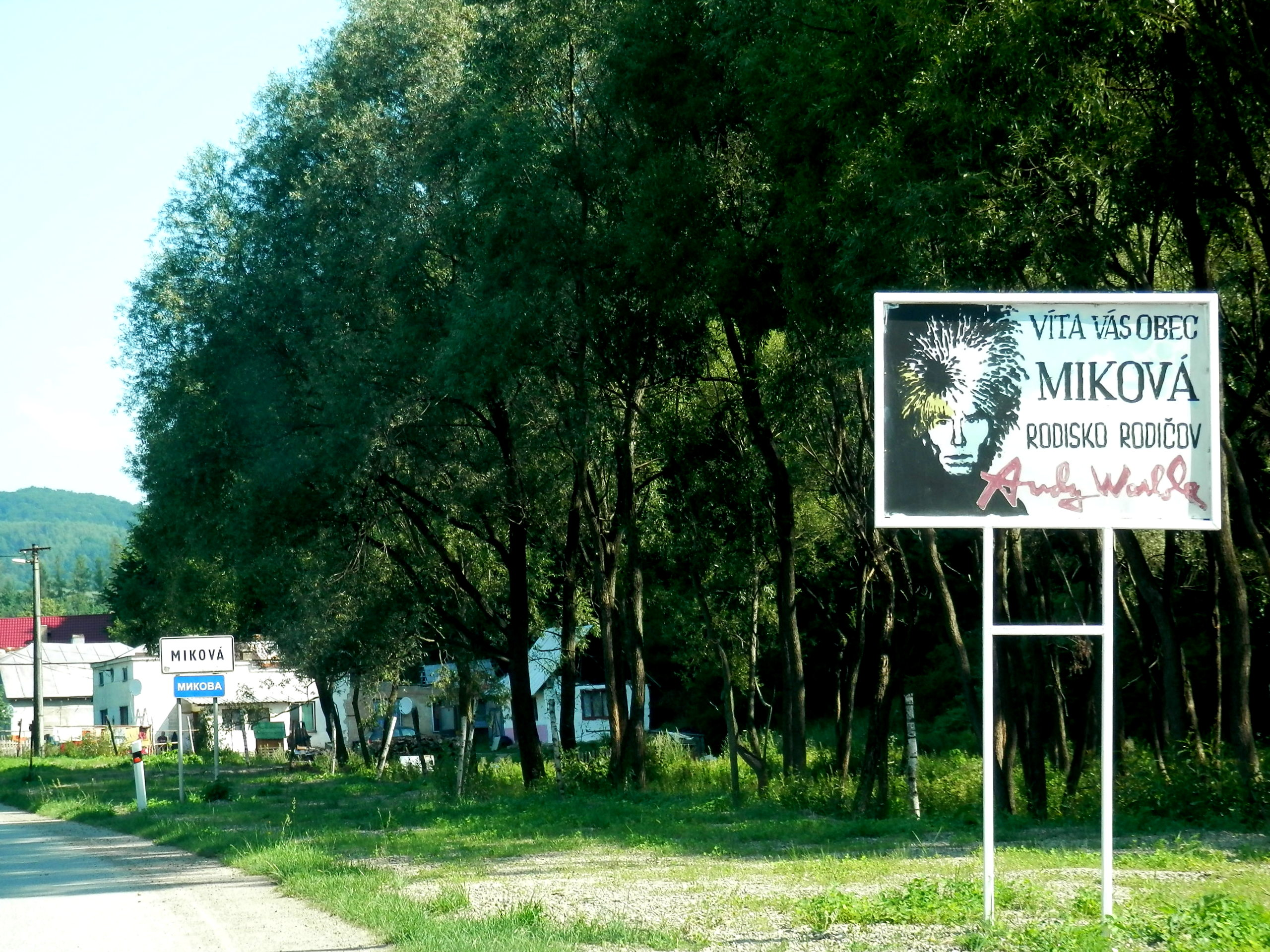
A plaque commemorating the parents of Andy Warhol, who emigrated from Miková. In the background, a bilingual Slovak-Rusyn entry sign.

Population statistic (10 years)
| Year | 1995 | 2005 | 2015 | 2025 |
|---|---|---|---|---|
| Count | 168 | 157 | 143 | 131 |
| Difference | | −6.54% | −8.91% | −8.39% |

Population statistic
| Year | 2024 | 2025 |
|---|---|---|
| Count | 136 | 131 |
| Difference | | −3.67% |

It has a population of 131 people (31 December 2025).

=== Ethnicity ===
Census 2021 (1+%)
| Ethnicity | Number | Fraction |
|---|---|---|
| Slovak | 61 | 41.78% |
| Rusyn | 60 | 41.09% |
| Romani | 30 | 20.54% |
| Not found out | 18 | 12.32% |
| Czech | 3 | 2.05% |
| Ukrainian | 2 | 1.36% |
| Hungarian | 2 | 1.36% |
| Total | 146 | |

In year 2021 was 146 people by ethnicity 61 as Slovak, 60 as Rusyn, 30 as Romani, 18 as Not found out, 3 as Czech, 2 as Ukrainian, 2 as Hungarian and 1 as Polish.

Note on population: The difference values of population numbers in the table "Population statistic" and in the sections "Ethnicity" & "Religion" is caused by the use of various statistical methods.

=== Religion ===
Census 2021 (1+%)
| Religion | Number | Fraction |
|---|---|---|
| Greek Catholic Church | 68 | 46.58% |
| Eastern Orthodox Church | 39 | 26.71% |
| Not found out | 15 | 10.27% |
| Roman Catholic Church | 10 | 6.85% |
| Jehovah's Witnesses | 7 | 4.79% |
| None | 4 | 2.74% |
| Total | 146 | |

In year 2021 was 146 people by religion 68 from Greek Catholic Church, 39 from Eastern Orthodox Church, 15 from Not found out, 10 from Roman Catholic Church, 7 from Jehovah's Witnesses, 4 from None, 1 from Calvinist Church, 1 from Apostolic Church and 1 from Ad hoc movements.

== Notable people ==
- Julia Warhola (1891–1972), artist, mother of the artists Andy Warhol and John Warhola and grandmother of the artist James Warhola
