= Debbie Harry (Warhol) =

1980 painting by Andy Warhol

- Artist: Andy Warhol
- Year: 1980
- Medium: Acrylic and silkscreen ink on canvas
- Movement: Pop Art
- Subject: Debbie Harry
- Dimensions: 106.7 cm × 106.7 cm (42.0 in × 42.0 in)

Debbie Harry is a silkscreen painting by American artist Andy Warhol, created in 1980. It depicts Debbie Harry, lead singer of the rock band Blondie. Warhol produced several color variations of the portrait, based on Polaroid photographs he took of Harry. These works have become some of the most recognized images in Warhol's oeuvre. The paintings are held in private collections and the Andy Warhol Museum in Pittsburgh. A few versions have also appeared at auction, with one selling for $8 million.

== Background ==
Pop artist Andy Warhol befriended singer Debbie Harry in the late 1970s, when Blondie emerged as a prominent band in the New York music scene. In her memoir Face It (2019), Harry expressed her admiration for Warhol and the impact he had on her life. "Andy was the master of blurring the line between art and commerce. … I admired Andy so much. Like Andy, I felt the influence of Marcel Duchamp and a kinship to Dada and Popism, which became foundational to what I was creating."

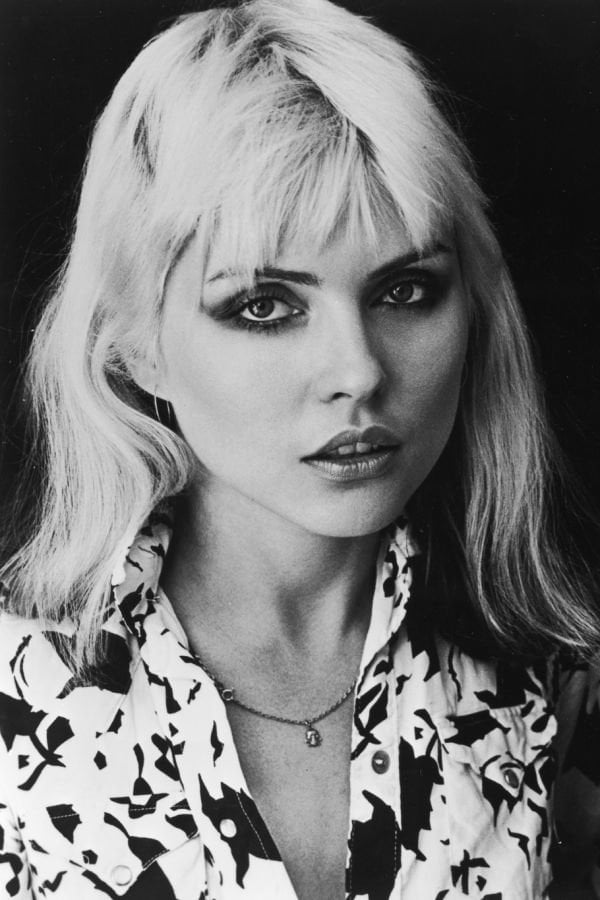
Debbie Harry by Brian McLaughlin, 1977

Harry recalled meeting Warhol for the first time while working as a waitress at Max's Kansas City. Harry and her partner, Blondie guitarist Chris Stein, later became acquainted with Warhol and socialized with him at dinners, nightclubs, concerts, and the Factory. Warhol documented their following encounters in The Andy Warhol Diaries (1989).

Warhol first mentioned Harry in a diary entry on July 21, 1977, recalling seeing her at the Factory: "The Blondie girl was being interviewed and photographed by Chris Makos. Her real name is Debbie Harry, she's been around for a long time, sort of on the fringes. She knows everybody. If she had a body like Cyrinda's she'd be really great, although her body's okay, like a Sandra Dee-Tuesday Weld-type body. She's small."

Harry appeared on the June 1979 cover of Warhol's Interview magazine. On June 7, 1979, Warhol threw a party to commemorate Interview's 10th anniversary and celebrate Blondie's hit single "Heart of Glass." On June 16, 1979, Harry accompanied Warhol to an Interview magazine signing at Brentano's in Manhasset, New York.

On July 4, 1980, Warhol and his partner Jed Johnson spent Independence Day with Harry, Stein, and writer Victor Bockris. They had drinks at Harry and Stein's penthouse at 200 West 58th Street in Manhattan before having dinner at Terrace in the Sky in Morningside Heights. Warhol noted that Harry had "gotten really rich from the Vanderbilt jeans ad and they're going to buy a building."

Warhol reportedly remarked that if he could have anyone else's face, it would be Harry's. In August 1980, Warhol photographed Harry at the Factory for her portrait. They continued to see each other in the 1980s. In December 1986, Warhol reflected on his own appearance: "My ambition if I were to really go and have a facelift and everything would be to come out like Debbie."

== Production ==
On August 12, 1980, Warhol photographed Harry at the Factory for her portrait. He recorded the photo session in his diary: "At 12:00 I had an appointment to meet Debbie Harry at the office (cab $4). I was early and Debbie and Chris were on time. We worked all afternoon. Debbie was sweet, every picture came out perfect."

Harry later recalled that Warhol began the process by taking Polaroid photographs with s Big Shot Polaroid camera, which was designed specifically for portrait photography. After taking the photographs he would show them to the sitter and ask which one they preferred. Harry remembered, "I saw a couple that I thought were good but I said, 'That's really up to you.' He's the artist; it seemed to be the safest thing to have him choose."

Warhol subsequently worked on the portrait with his assistant Rupert Jasen Smith, continuing into September 1980. He produced several paintings in various color combinations based on two Polaroid photographs.

Warhol charged clients $25,000 for a portrait, with an additional $15,000 for each extra panel. Former Interview editor Bob Colacello recalled: "If someone ordered two panels, he would paint four, hoping they would then take them all. Sometimes when people saw how great four looked side by side, they would open their check books a little more." Warhol initially made four portraits of Harry, but she purchased only one. Harry remembered: "Seeing them together in those different colors, I wanted all of them. … They didn't even try and offer me a discount. They knew I didn't have that kind of money"

== Description ==
Measuring 40 × 40 inches (106.7 × 106.7 cm) each, the portraits are composed of multiple layers of silkscreen ink applied over acrylic paint. The background and makeup color combinations vary.

Warhol depicts Harry in a close-up, full-frame composition with her flowing hair extending into the background. Her features are defined by dark shadows, while her brightly colored eyeshadow and red lips provide contrasting accents. In several portraits, Harry's head is slightly tilted against backgrounds in lilac, canary yellow, soft yellow, and tangerine. In other variations, she faces directly towards the camera with her head upright against backgrounds in bubblegum pink, baby pink, and orange.

== Exhibitions ==
Three portraits of Harry were included in the exhibition Andy Warhol, Portraits at the Tony Shafrazi Gallery in New York City from May 12 to October 1, 2005.

Two portraits were included in the exhibition Warhol Live at Jean-Noël Desmarais Pavilion in Montreal from September 25, 2008 to January 18, 2009.

A portrait of Harry was included in the exhibition Le Grande Monde d'Andy Warhol at the Galeries Nationals du Grande Palais in Paris from March 18 to July 13, 2009.

Harry loaned her painting for the retrospective Andy Warhol—From A to B and Back Again at the Whitney Museum of American Art in New York City from November 12, 2018 to March 31, 2019.

Two Debbie Harry portraits were part of the retrospective Andy Warhol, which opened at the Tate Modern in London on March 20, 2020. The exhibition was interrupted due to the COVID-19 pandemic.

A portrait of Harry was included in the exhibition FAME: Andy Warhol in AlUla at Maraya Concert Hall in AlUla, Saudi Arabia from February 17 to May 16, 2023.

== Collections ==
Harry owns a yellow version of the portrait. Two paintings, one orange and one blue, are held in the collection of the Andy Warhol Museum in Pittsburgh. A pink version is in a private collection. Another yellow version and a Lilac version ar in the collection of Phyllis and Jerome Lyle Rappaport. Businessman Peter B. Lewis and fashion designer Stephen Sprouse have previously owned the soft yellow version of the portrait.

== Art market ==
On November 12, 2014, the soft yellow Debbie Harry portrait sold for $3.1 million at Sotheby's Contemporary Art Day Sale in New York.

On March 1, 2023, the pink Debbie Harry portrait, sold for £6,599,300 ($8 million) at Sotheby's Modern & Contemporary Evening Auction in London. It previously fetched £3.7 million ($6.2 million) at Sotheby's Contemporary Art Evening Auction in London on June 29, 2011.
