= Revolver Gallery =

Art gallery in West Hollywood, California, United States

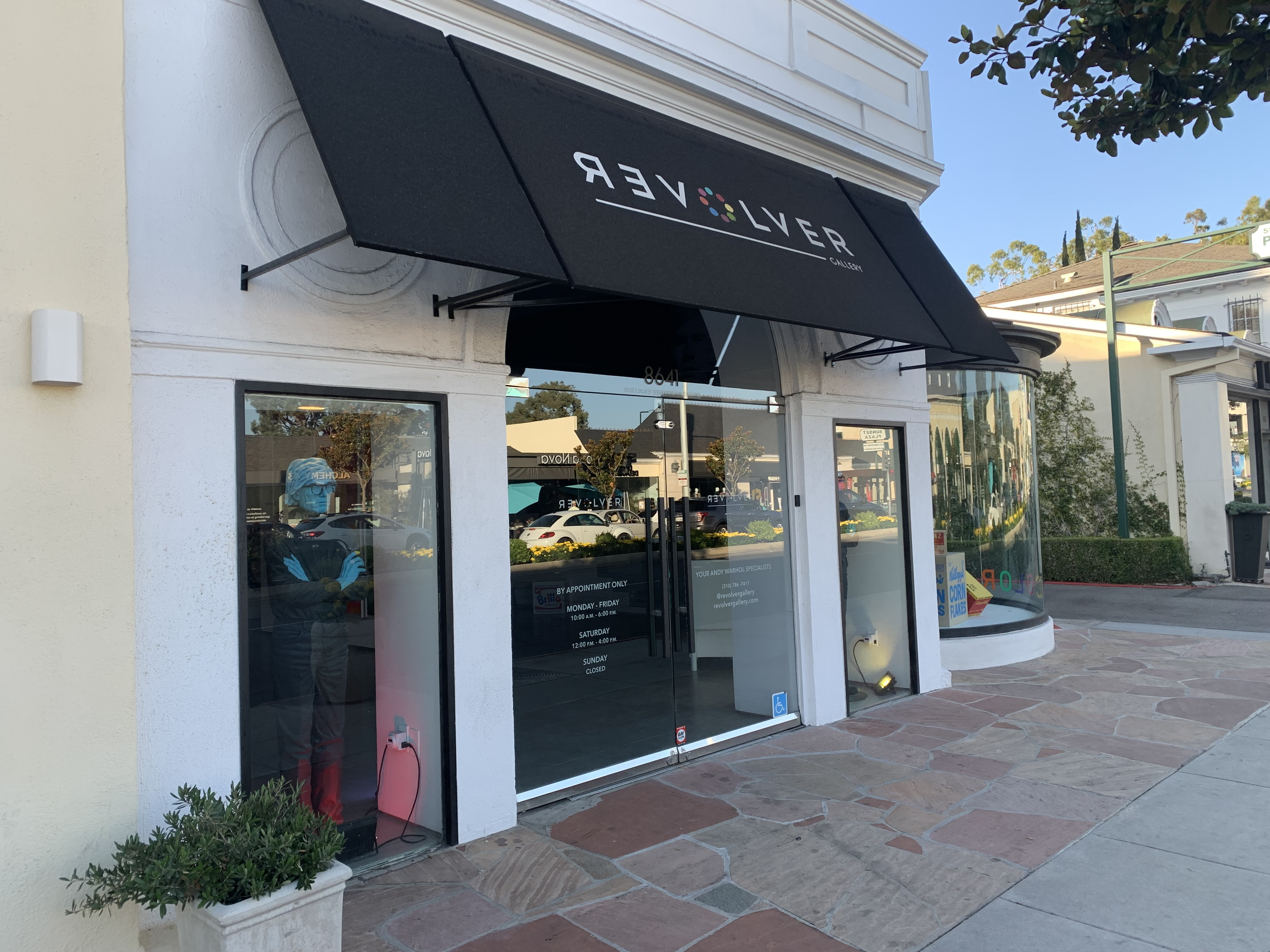
- Interactive map of Revolver Gallery
- Address: 8641 W Sunset Blvd
- Location: West Hollywood, California
- Coordinates: 34.092282°N 118.380320°W
- Type: Art gallery

Website
- https://revolverwarholgallery.com/

Revolver Gallery is a Los Angeles-based art gallery with a one-artist program focused on Andy Warhol's pop art career. With over 400 Warhols in its collection, Revolver houses the largest gallery-owned collection of Andy Warhol's artwork world-wide.

== History ==
Revolver was established in Beverly Hills in 2012 by entrepreneur Ron Rivlin who began collecting Warhol after learning that a friend realized a 600% return from a Warhols purchased 10 years earlier. Rivlin then started buying "everything he liked." In a 2015 interview, he said, “My rule was, if I would put it up behind my sofa, I would buy it.” Revolver is notable for exclusively dealing Warhol's work. Now, with over 400 original prints and paintings in its collection, Revolver Gallery has the largest gallery-owned collection of Warhol works in the entire world.

A small gallery at launch, Revolver exhibited Warhol pieces through traveling exhibits such as Andy Warhol: Icons & Symbols. The exhibit opened at L’Ermitage Hotel in Beverly Hills and later moved to the Malibu Lumber Yard Gallery. Other exhibits included Andy Warhol's Ten Prolific Jews, Andy's Socialites and Gotti on Trial.

In 2017, Revolver moved from Beverly Hills to a larger gallery at Bergamot Station in Santa Monica. Its first exhibit, Andy Warhol Revisited, opened on February 22, 2017, the 30th anniversary of Warhol's death. In addition to Warhol's work, the Bergamot location exhibited a work done in collaboration with Keith Haring and a tribute to Warhol by Deborah Kass. Revolver subsequently moved to West Hollywood.

The Revolver collection includes Warhol's 1974 Rolls-Royce Silver Shadow, Andy Mouse (four original screenprints by Keith Haring, depicting Andy Warhol as Mickey Mouse on a dollar bill), Campbell's Tomato Juice Box (a 1964 silkscreen ink and house paint on plywood), and the John Gotti Unique Portfolio (Warhol's four unique screenprints by commission for the cover of Time in 1986).

Notable celebrities who have visited Revolver include: Bruno Mars, Dave Navarro, Ryan Tedder, Coldplay, Jared Leto, and Billy Morrison.

== Warhol Revisited [Traveling exhibits] ==
=== Vancouver ===
Revolver's exhibition titled A Different Idea of Love opened in Yaletown's Maison Ai warehouse in early 2015. The showcase included rare works from Revolver's collection, private owners, and The Andy Warhol Foundation For the Arts. Works on display in the show included silkscreens of Elizabeth Taylor, rare silkscreens of Muhammad Ali, and Warhol's silkscreens of shoes. The show was free to the public and was even extended to stay beyond its intended run. At the time, A Different Idea of Love was the largest Warhol show in Canada's history. It was later topped by Revolver's Warhol Revisited: A Mirror for Today that was held in Toronto the same year.

=== Toronto ===
Toronto-born Rivlin curated the 2015 exhibit Andy Warhol Revisited: A Mirror For Today in the Yorkville neighborhood of Toronto, Canada. A collaboration with museums, the Andy Warhol Foundation, Christie's, and private collectors, it included more than 120 pieces from the Revolver collection. It was the largest grouping of Warhol's work ever shown in Canada.

Andy Warhol Revisited: A Mirror for Today ran six months in 2015. It included famous Warhol works such as his “Campbell’s Soup Cans” series in addition to silkscreen portraits of Marilyn Monroe, Mick Jagger, and Elizabeth Taylor. Described as a “modern day extension of Warhol’s idea that pop is for everyone,” the exhibit, in addition to displaying Warhol's work, featured interactive elements such as an integrated mobile app and an audio tour. Prior to Revolver's show, the last major Warhol exhibition was hosted by Canadian filmmaker David Cronenberg in 2006 at the Art Gallery of Ontario. Revolver's exhibition drew in more than 50,000 visitors between March and April alone.

=== Los Angeles ===
Between February 11 and August 27 of 2017, Revolver Gallery launched their exhibition Andy Warhol: Revisited | Thirty Years Later. Coinciding with the 30th anniversary of Andy Warhol's death, the exhibit included over 200 works of art in rotation. Ron Rivlin, curator and founder of Revolver Gallery described the exhibition as “[encapsulating] the artist’s fascination with glamour, fame, money, celebrity and tragedy through his artistic creations.” The exhibition featured rare and sought-after works such as Warhol's Marilyn Monroe silkscreens, a rare Andy Mouse portfolio by artist Keith Haring in collaboration with Warhol, and even Warhol's 1974 Rolls-Royce Silver Shadow (complete with original registration). Andy Warhol: Revisited | Thirty Years Later marked the first time that Warhol's car has ever been displayed publicly.

Andy Warhol: Revisited | Thirty Years Later was celebrated during its initial run and was even visited by actor Jared Leto who had begun preparing for his role as Andy Warhol in a currently untitled biopic of the famed artist. Leto will star and produce the film with Michael De Luca also set to produce; Terence Winter has been tapped to write the screenplay, which will be an adaptation of Victor Bockris' book Warhol: The Biography.

== Andy Warhol Print Market Report ==
=== WARHOL LIVES: 2022 Print Market Report ===
In April 2022, Revolver released its second Andy Warhol Print Market Report, titled WARHOL LIVES, in a limited edition run of only 1,000 copies. The 120 page report, which aims to "demystify the Warhol market for investors and collectors" was published and released via Amazon, and quickly became the No.1 best seller in several categories, including Art Prints, Business of Art, and Artists' Books. The information on Warhol's market presented in the book is deduced from analyses of public auction records and art price databases. WARHOL LIVES also includes an updated version of the Warhol Print Market Index, an original financial index created by Revolver in order to compare the performance of Warhol's art market with that of other stock market indexes such as the Dow Jones.

In a newsletter released to promote its publication, Revolver called the 2022 report "the definitive guide to collecting Warhol prints" and a "holistic overview of Warhol's print market today." In that same newsletter, as well as on the book's Amazon page, Revolver said that in the report, author and Revolver Gallery owner Ron Rivlin explains "how Warhol print prices are determined, their average rate of increase, and why the majority of Warhol prints sell for above their high estimate; how the market contracted during the COVID-19 pandemic, and why it enjoyed a historically strong return in 2021." Some of the major takeaways included in the book, as presented on the back cover, include the following:

- Revolver's 2022 Warhol Print Market Index.
- Top prints by sales and value appreciation.
- Which prints are fetching the highest prices.
- Prints to watch in the coming decade.
- Historical growth rates for individual prints and complete portfolios.
- How the average print increased by 39% in one year.

Revolver's Warhol Print Market Report continues to be the only report of its kind, providing a wealth of specialized information all about the current state of Andy Warhol's market, with additional literature about the artist's career, authentications, recent efforts by The Andy Warhol Foundation for the Visual Arts, and recent and upcoming Warhol exhibitions.

All of the proceeds from book sales of WARHOL LIVES were donated to UNICEF.

=== THE ROYAL WARHOL YEAR: 2023 Print Market Report ===
Revolver Gallery released the third edition of the Andy Warhol Print Market Report on March 1, 2023, titled "The Royal Warhol Year." The title and book cover reference Warhol's Queen Elizabeth II of the United Kingdom screen prints from the artist's Reigning Queens series, which experienced a dramatic rise in value following the death of the Queen on September 8, 2022. The following November, one of Warhol's Queen Elizabeth prints sold for more than $800,000, setting a new record for the most valuable Warhol print ever sold at auction.

The third report followed the footsteps of the 2022 edition, presenting comprehensive data related to Warhol's print sales over the past year, making "value-adding projections," and "discussing themes in the Warhol market that are crucial for collectors and investors to understand so that they can make informed decisions." Unlike the first edition—a free PDF made available for download via Revolver's website—the second and third edition of Revolver's market report were published on Amazon and made available in soft and hardcover copies, with 2023's edition made available for Amazon Kindle users.

Highlights of the third market report include the updated version of the Warhol Print Market Index (WPMI), Revolver's original financial index used to compare the performance of Warhol's print market with that of other stock market indices; a new selection of "prints to watch," which accurately predicted the rise in value of the Queen Elizabeth prints in 2022's report; a review of the Andy Warhol Foundation's collaborations with brands and businesses during 2022; and an analysis of the Supreme Court case between Lynn Goldsmith and the Andy Warhol Foundation over the copyright of Warhol's Prince silkscreens and the potential consequences of the ruling on artist copyright laws, with which the book closes.

As with Revolver's 2022 report, all of the proceeds from sales of the book were donated to charity, specifically the Michael J. Fox Foundation for Parkinson's Research.

=== THE ICONIC WARHOL: 2024 Print Market Report ===
Revolver released its fourth print market report, "The Iconic Warhol," on February 28, 2024. The report continues Revolver's tradition of tracking Warhol's market performance by analyzing public auction records and art price databases. It also reflects on the institutions working to prolong Warhol's legacy, and includes a final review of Lynn Goldsmith vs. The Andy Warhol Foundation—which [[Andy Warhol Foundation for the Visual Arts, Inc. v. Goldsmith#Decision:~:text=[56]-,Decision,-[edit]|concluded]] in May 2023—continued the analysis of the case from the previous year.

The report describes the Warhol print market as a "seesaw bring pulled uphill," referencing the short-term volatility but long-term steady growth that is inherent to the Warhol market and that makes it one of the most popular choices for art investors. Much like the previous year, "The Iconic Warhol" shows sales records from 2022 fading and the marketing returning to slow, steady growth in 2023. The report focuses on Warhol's long term stability, as well as an overall stabilizing force in the art market as a whole.

The 2024 report also examines several shifts in the Warhol market, including the generational transition in collectors and the accompanying changes in popularity of specific prints as common taste evolves. The report makes the point that, in 2023, market forces revealed a strong inclination from collectors and investors toward Warhol's "icons," which the book describes as subject's of Warhol's art that "represent something bigger than themselves. According to the author, "iconic" prints such as Marilyn Monroe, Mickey Mouse, or The Birth of Venus, are the most likely to be the highest-appreciating prints of the future.

As a general theme, the 2024 print report spotlights the Warhol market's "tremendous long-term stability and growth," focusing on its ability to maintain itself at bare minimum. This is highlighted amongst the rest of the art market, and especially in the context of war, fear, and economic downturn that was present in the globalized world at the time of publication.
