= Andy Warhol's Exposures =

1979 book by Andy Warhol

- Author: Andy Warhol; Bob Colacello
- Language: English
- Genre: Photo book
- Published: 1979
- Publisher: Andy Warhol Books/Grosset & Dunlap
- Publication place: United States
- ISBN: 9780448128504

Exposures, also known as Andy Warhol's Exposures, is a 1979 photography book by American artist Andy Warhol, with text co-written by Bob Colacello. Published by Andy Warhol Books, an imprint of Grosset & Dunlap, the book combines candid black-and-white photographs with anecdotal text to document Warhol's social circle and the celebrity culture of 1970s New York.

== Background ==
Pop artist Andy Warhol was a photography enthusiast who famously carried around a Polaroid camera in the 1970s. He used Polaroids as the basis of his commissioned silkscreen portraits.

In 1976, Warhol and Bob Colacello, editor of Warhol's Interview magazine, both purchased a Minox 35EL camera while they were in Bonn. Considering the amount of traveling they did, Warhol suggested that they should do a photography book together with the photos they took at social events and business trips. Warhol liked how small and sleek the camera looked, comparing it to a "'spy' camera because it takes pictures without arousing the notice of the subject."

Photographer Christopher Makos was hired as the art director for the book to create the layout.

== Content ==
Exposures reflects Andy Warhol's deep immersion in celebrity culture at the end of the 1970s. Framed as both a photographic record and a social document, the book centers on the "glitterati" orbiting venues such as Studio 54 and other fashionable nightlife spaces. Warhol himself described his omnipresence at such events with characteristic irony, writing that he would attend "the opening of anything, including a toilet seat."

The book contains more than 350 black-and-white unpublished photographs alongside a loosely structured, conversational text. Its tone is informal and often gossipy, capturing figures from across art, fashion, politics, and entertainment, including Mick Jagger, Bianca Jagger, Truman Capote, Jacqueline Kennedy Onassis, Liza Minnelli, Halston, Diana Vreeland, Calvin Klein, Muhammad Ali, Yves Saint Laurent, Jimmy Carter, Gore Vidal, Tennessee Williams, Elton John, and others within Warhol's extended circle.

Warhol approached the project as a form of informal photojournalism, aiming to capture "famous people doing something unfamous"—moments of ordinariness such as eating, talking, or off-guard gestures. At the same time, he admitted the limitations of his method and emphasized his reluctance to present subjects negatively, noting that as the publisher of Interview magazine, "I won't let anyone say anything bad (about others) in print. I always like to put people up, rather than down." This ethos extended to the photographs themselves, which, while candid, avoided overtly unflattering portrayals.

Several of the book's anecdotes were drawn from Colacello's own experiences, a process he later described with ambivalence in his memoir Holy Terror: Andy Warhol Up Close: "I hated the fact that I was ghostwriting again, that every time I typed 'I' it was Andy, not me. When I'd worked on the Philosophy book that had seemed liberating, but now it felt humiliating, especially since the stories 'I' was telling were mine, not Andy's. In some cases, I put Andy at scenes where only I had been. It was a form of lying of course, but there was no other way to write an Andy Warhol book, no more Warhol way."

== Publication ==
Warhol and Colacello formed a co-publishing company, Andy Warhol Books, which was marketed and distributed by Grosset & Dunlap. They received 50% of the profits and a $35,000 advance but they had to pay the production costs. Production took longer than anticipated and most of their advance was used to cover the expenses.

The book was released on October 15, 1979. The first print of 25,000 sold out within a week of publication. The book cost $25, but there were limited edition copies for $500 that included a silkscreen print signed by Warhol.

The November 1979 issue of Esquire featured a selection of photographs from Exposures, accompanied by excerpts from the book's text.

== Promotional tour ==
In November 1979, Warhol embarked on a 3-week book tour to promote Exposures. One stop on the tour was at Kramers in Washington, D.C. on November 13, 1979. According to Paul Richard of The Washington Post:

[Warhol] was "nice to the DuPont Circle crowd who stood in line for autographs [...] He signed their books, their wrists, and the Campbell's soup cans they brought him. He also signed their photographs, their T-shirts, and their underwear. "Sign my underpants," they ordered. Warhol did as he was told. He is a workaholic. He signed and signed and signed. His signature began to shrink as the evening wore on, but he kept on signing.

== Critical reception ==
Critical responses noted that Exposures suggested a shift in Warhol's practice—from anticipating cultural trends to documenting them. Nevertheless, the book remains a vivid snapshot of late-1970s celebrity culture, shaped by Warhol's unique position at its center and his ongoing fascination with fame, intimacy, and social performance.

Paul Weingarten of the Chicago Tribune wrote: "The book is a paean to the 'glitterati' who flock to Studio 54 and all the chic watering holes. Its text is breathlessly gossipy, and its pictures, all black and white (he hasn't learned to take color ones yet), chronicle the antics of Warhol's acquaintances and friends."

William S. Murphy wrote in the Los Angeles Times: "From a technical standpoint, the pictures in this volume are atrocious, which really enhances the book's charm. He lights each frame with a booming strobe flash in a style similar to the work of Arthur Fellig, best known as Weegee ... The text covering his nighttime adventures in Manhattan is superb. And one must credit his pictures for one quality. they are indeed candid."

Marian Christy of The Boston Globe praised Warhol's humor in the book, writing "Warhol has simply given humor a new style ... Pop art has become pop humor." "Andy Warhol even knows how to make fun of himself. He shared precious tidbits about his private terrors," she added.
