= The Philosophy of Andy Warhol =

1975 book by Andy Warhol

The Philosophy of Andy Warhol (From A to B & Back Again)
- Cover of the first edition
- Author: Andy Warhol
- Language: English
- Subject: Philosophy
- Published: 1975
- Publisher: Harcourt Brace Jovanovich
- Publication place: United States
- Pages: 241

The Philosophy of Andy Warhol (From A to B & Back Again) is a 1975 book by the American artist Andy Warhol. It was first published by Harcourt Brace Jovanovich.

The book is an assemblage of vignettes about love, beauty, fame, work, sex, time, death, economics, success, and art, among other topics, by the "Prince of Pop".

== Background ==
Warhol signed two book contracts in 1974 with Harcourt, one for The Philosophy and the second for a biography of Paulette Goddard, which was never completed.

The Philosophy was ghostwritten by Warhol's frequent collaborator, Pat Hackett, and Interview magazine editor Bob Colacello. Much of the material is drawn from taped interviews Hackett did with Warhol specifically for the book, and also from conversations Warhol had taped between himself and Colacello and Brigid Berlin.

== Publication ==
The Philosophy was published by Harcourt Brace Jovanovich in August 1975. In May, Warhol signed 6,000 copies of the book at HBJ's warehouse in Saddle Brook, New Jersey in advance of its release. When orders exceeded the number of signed copies, he returned to the warehouse in July and signed an additional 8,000 copies.

An excerpt from the book appeared in the September 1975 issue of Cosmopolitan. Art dealer Leo Castelli hosted a reception for Warhol at his New York gallery, while fashion designer Halston held a party for him at his home on September 13. The following day, Warhol began a promotional tour at the Baltimore Museum of Art, where his exhibition Andy Warhol: Paintings 1962–1975 was on view.

== Promotional tour ==
In September, Warhol embarked on an extensive U.S. promotional tour with his editor Bob Colacello, business manager Fred Hughes, boyfriend Jed Johnson, and bodyguard Lady Anne Lambton. He signed copies of the book in department-store windows, art galleries, bookstores, and at cocktail parties hosted by art collectors. The tour subsequently continued in England and Canada. Warhol would sign almost anything brought to him, but when presented with a copy of the new book, he would draw a Campbell's Soup can on it.

Date	City	Country	Venue	Ref.
September 1975	New York	United States	Madison Avenue Bookshop	
September 14, 1975	Baltimore	United States	Baltimore Museum of Arts	
September 15, 1975	Ann Arbor	United States	Centicore Bookstore	
September 16, 1975	Chicago	United States	Kroch's and Brentano's	
September 18, 1975	Minneapolis	United States	B. Dalton	
September 19, 1975	Los Angeles	United States	Margo Leavin Gallery	
September 20, 1975	Los Angeles	United States	Pickwick Book Shop	
September 21, 1975	Beverly Hills	United States	Home of Dolly Bright Carter	
September 22, 1975	Los Angeles	United States	Cedars-Sinai Medical Center	
September 22, 1975	Beverly Hills	United States	Home of Harry "Coco" Joe Brown Jr.	
September 22, 1975	Los Angeles	United States	Home of Frederic and Marcia Weisman	
September 23, 1975	Beverly Hills	United States	Hunter's Books	
September 24, 1975	San Francisco	United States	B. Dalton	
September 24, 1975	San Francisco	United States	Berggruen Gallery	
September 26, 1975	Houston	United States	Foley's	
September 26, 1975	Houston	United States	Home of Dominique de Menil	
September 29, 1975	St. Louis	United States	Stix, Baer & Fuller	
October 7, 1975	Washington, D.C.	United States	Corcoran Gallery of Art	
October 8, 1975	Washington, D.C.	United States	Woodward & Lothrop	
October 9, 1975	Baltimore	United States	Hochschild Kohn's	
November 3, 1975	London	United Kingdom	Claude Gill Books	
November 4, 1975	London	United Kingdom	The Arts Council Shop	
November 17, 1975	Palm Beach	United States	The Colony Hotel	
November 30, 1975	Toronto	Canada	Art Gallery of Ontario	

== Critical reception ==
Barbara Goldsmith of The New York Times noted that "Warhol's basic philosophical premise is 'nothing'; not the futility of human endeavor of Sartre and Camus, or the void beyond pain of Joan Didion, but simply—nothing added." "The sections of this book that tell us about Andy's own life are fresh and illuminating," she added. Although unsure that Warhol wrote the book himself, Goldsmith said, "It doesn't really matter, which is his point exactly. The important message is how Warhol managed to make himself into a machinelike presence devoid of empathy."

John Raymond of The Atlanta Journal-Constitution wrote: "Andy Warhol's philosophy is not a philosophical system in the accepted sense … Even esthetics, which as an artist you might think would interest him, doesn't really. 'After I did the thing called "art,"' he tells us, 'or whatever it's called, I went into business art. I wanted to be an art business man or a business artist. Being good in business is the most fascinating kind of art."

Owen Findsen of The Cincinnati Enquirer observed that "the book reads like a Richard Brautigan novel about a character that combines the humor and self-image of Woody Allen with the moral ethics of Tiny Tim.

Caroline Tisdall of The Guardian wrote, "It's not often you find a personal philosophy that is both comforting and funny. Warhol's is. The comfort comes from his treatment of the big issues: love, sex, time, fame, and death. The fun lies in the spaces in between: art, economies, work, and underwear. … This is a highly moral book, and the morality lies in its tolerance. This is applied not just to people but even extended to critics: for Warhol, nothing that is said about him can be dismissed as 'wrong.' since it is a reaction, and therefore has a cause. There are only a couple of artists working now who are big enough to recognise that."

== Lou Reed musical ==
In 1975, Warhol told The Daily Illini that Lou Reed had written a musical based on The Philosophy of Andy Warhol (From A to B & Back Again) in a single day. Warhol said Reed had asked for his permission to adapt the book and subsequently presented him with the completed work, which Warhol was expected to develop further with additional ideas. Warhol also said that Reed hoped to bring the musical to Broadway, with Lorna Luft and David Cassidy in the cast. In October 2019, music by Reed based on the book was reported to have been discovered in the archives of the Andy Warhol Museum in Pittsburgh.
