= Bob Colacello =

American writer (born 1947)

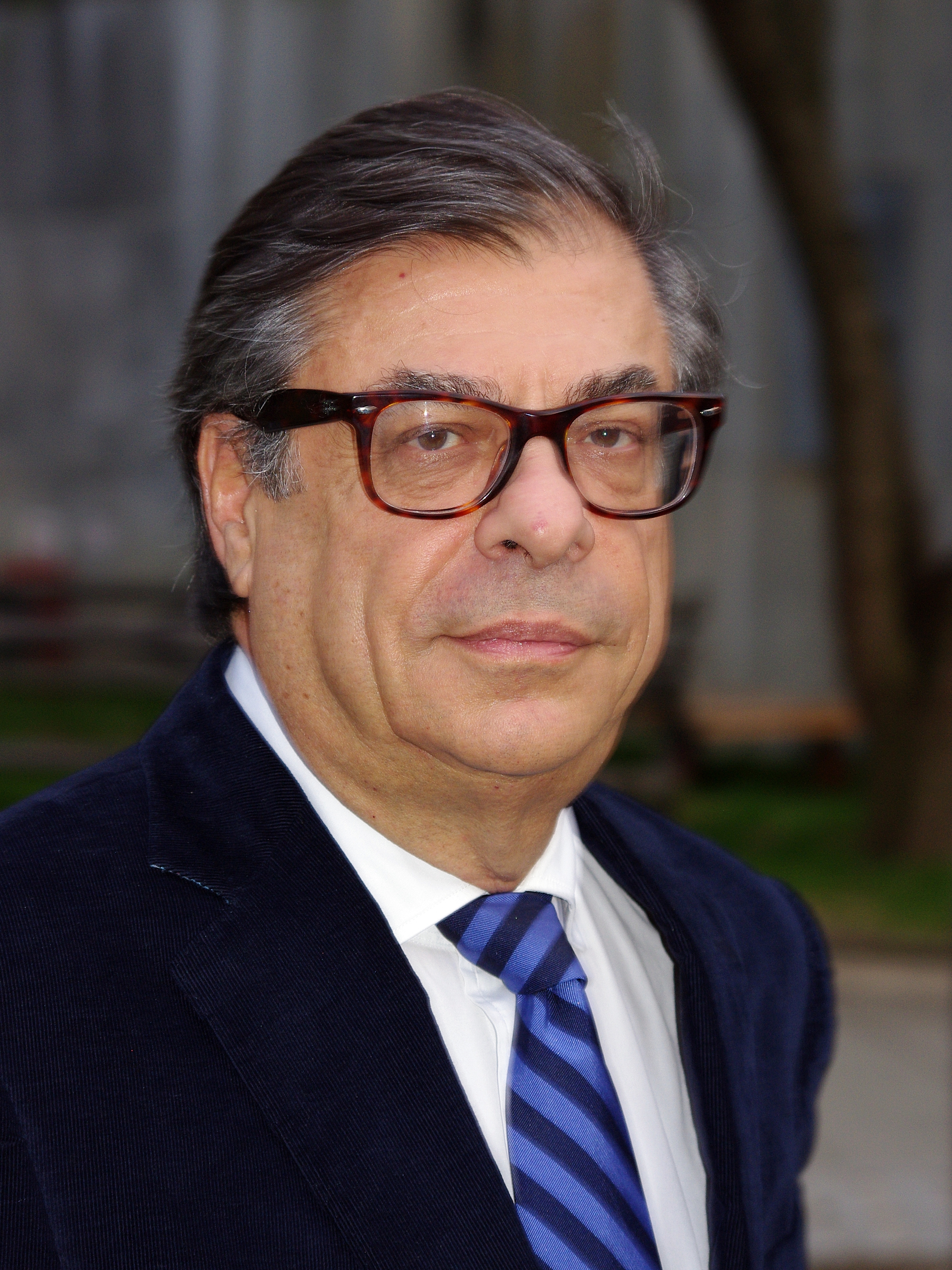
- Colacello at the 2011 Tribeca Film Festival Vanity Fair party
- Born: Robert Colaciello; May 8, 1947 (age 79); Bensonhurst, New York, U.S.
- Education: Georgetown University; Columbia University
- Occupation: Writer

Robert Colaciello (born May 8, 1947), known professionally as Bob Colacello, is an American writer. He is best known for his work with Interview magazine, where he served as the editor during the 1970s and early 1980s, helping transform it from a film publication into a magazine focused on popular culture. A close associate of Pop artist Andy Warhol, Colacello documented his social life and collaborated with him on the books The Philosophy of Andy Warhol (1975) and Exposures (1979). He later became a longtime contributor to Vanity Fair, and has published books including Holy Terror: Andy Warhol Close Up (1990) and Ronnie and Nancy: Their Path to the White House, 1911–1980 (2004). His photography has also been exhibited and published.

== Early life and education ==
Robert Colaciello was born to John and Libby Colaciello in Bensonhurst, New York on May 8, 1947. He and his two sisters, Barbara and Suzanne, were raised in Plainview, Long Island. He graduated from the Edmund A. Walsh School of Foreign Service at Georgetown University in 1969, and has an MFA in film criticism from Columbia University School of the Arts, where he studied under film critic Andrew Sarris.

== Career ==
=== Early career and Interview years ===
Colacello's writing career began in 1970, when he contributed weekly film reviews to The Village Voice.

In April 1970, while commuting to Columbia from his parents' home in Rockville Centre, New York, he was contacted by Soren Agenoux, then editor of Pop artist Andy Warhol's inter/VIEW: A Monthly Film Journal. Agenoux had read a film review Colacello had written for the alternative newspaper New Times and invited him to contribute to the magazine. His first assignment was a review of the Brazilian film Antonio das Mortes (1969). Colacello traveled to inter/VIEW's offices at 33 Union Square West in Manhattan, where Agenoux read his review and offered him $25 per article. Agenoux then introduced him to Warhol, marking the beginning of Colacello's association with Warhol and the Factory.

By October 1970, Colacello was contributing regularly to inter/VIEW, with Agenoux publishing one or two of his articles each month. His assignments included an interview with Italian filmmaker Bernardo Bertolucci, whose film The Conformist (1970) had attracted attention at that year's New York Film Festival, as well as a critical piece on the Hollywood film The Magic Garden of Stanley Sweetheart (1970). Colacello also reviewed Warhol's film Trash (1970) for The Village Voice.

After Agenoux was dismissed as managing editor, Colacello was offered his position by filmmaker Paul Morrissey, who had become dissatisfied with the magazine's direction. Although Colacello was still completing his master's degree at Columbia and his father didn't want him working for Warhol, he accepted the position at a salary of $50 a week after receiving approval from the university to count his work at the magazine toward two courses. He recruited his former Georgetown and Columbia classmate Glenn O'Brien as his assistant, paying him $40 a week. Morrissey and Warhol then left for Paris to film L'Amour (1971), leaving Colacello with the key to the magazine's office and responsibility for its production. For his first issue, Colacello used 1940s publicity stills of actress Rita Hayworth, including one on the cover and throughout the issue, an idea suggested by Morrissey.

Early in his tenure at inter/VIEW, Colacello continued to publish under his birth name, Robert Colaciello. During a tour of Germany with Warhol in February 1971, Warhol suggested that he shorten his name to "Bob Cola" to give it a more "pop" quality, but Colacello rejected the idea because he wanted to retain his Italian identity. Later that year, the School of Visual Arts announced Colacello as the instructor of a new evening course, "Stars and the Cinema," which examined the concept and cultural significance of movie stars. The announcement noted that he was writing a book about Warhol's film world.

From 1972 to 1973, Glenn O'Brien replaced Colacello as managing editor, during which the magazine was redesigned as Interview and increasingly reflected Warhol's social life. Colacello became a special contributing editor during this period. After O'Brien left for Rolling Stone, Rosemary Kent, formerly an editor at Women's Wear Daily, served as editor-in-chief from 1973 to 1974. Colacello then became executive editor in 1974.

Under Colacello, Interview developed into one of the best-known lifestyle magazines of the period. In 1974, he began writing the "Out" column, which chronicled the parties, lunches, dinners, art openings, film premieres, and other social events he attended. Colacello later recalled that Warhol encouraged him to write about virtually everyone he encountered, reasoning that people mentioned in the column would buy the magazine and encourage others to do the same. During this period he co-wrote The Philosophy of Andy Warhol (From A to Z and Back Again (1975).

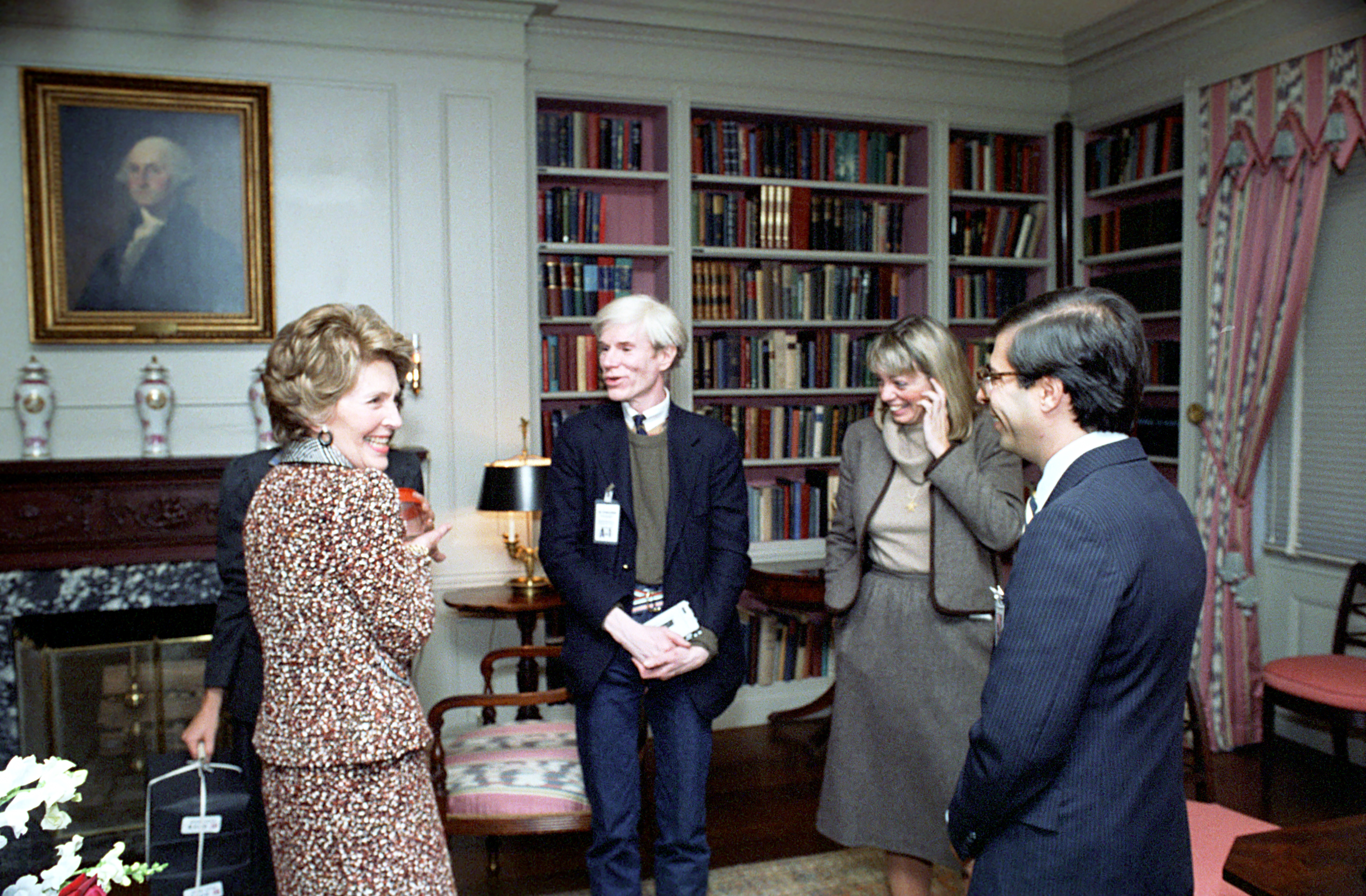
First lady Nancy Reagan, Andy Warhol, Barbara Cook, and Colacello in the White House Library for Interview, 1981

Colacello also accompanied Warhol to parties and social events, where he approached celebrities, socialites, and heads of stateabout commissioning portraits from the artist. Through his work for Interview and his association with Warhol, he documented the people and social circles surrounding the artist. Beginning in 1976, he photographed nightlife, parties, travels, and social events with a Minox 35 EL camera. Some of these photographs were later published in Andy Warhol's Exposures (1979).

In 1983, Colacello left Interview following growing tensions with Warhol. He later cited disputes over credit for books he had ghostwritten and Warhol's jealousy over the attention he received from First lady Nancy Reagan among the reasons for his departure. According to Victor Bockris' book Warhol: The Biography (1989), their relationship had also deteriorated as Colacello sought greater control over Andy Warhol Enterprises.

=== Vanity Fair and later career ===
In 1984, Colacello began writing for Vanity Fair, where he became known for extended profiles of prominent figures in politics, art, fashion, entertainment, and high society. His subjects have included Prince Charles and Camilla Parker Bowles, Balthus, Rudolf Nureyev, Liza Minnelli, Estée Lauder, Doris Duke, and Naomi Campbell. Since 1993, he has served as a special correspondent for the publication.

Colacello has also written biographies and memoirs. His memoir of his years with Warhol, Holy Terror: Andy Warhol Close Up (1990), was praised by The New York Times as the "best-written and the most killingly observed" book about the artist. His book Ronnie and Nancy: Their Path to the White House, 1911–1980 (2004) chronicles the social and political rise of Ronald and Nancy Reagan.

Colacello's photography has also been exhibited and published. In 2007, Bob Colacello's Out, a collection of his photographs, was published. In 2019, Vito Schnabel Projects in New York presented Pictures From Another Time: Photographs by Bob Colacello, 1976–82, an exhibition of approximately 150 vintage and unique prints. In 2023, Thaddaeus Ropac presented It Just Happened, Photographs 1976–1982 in London, marking Colacello's first solo exhibition in the city.

In 2022, Colacello appeared in the Netflix documentary series The Andy Warhol Diaries, based on Warhol's posthumously published diaries.

== Personal life ==
For a time in the 1970s, Colacello lived with his boyfriend, Kevin Farley, who worked at Iolas Gallery in New York.

In 1980, Warhol painted a portrait of Colacello as a gift for brokering a commissioned sale. Colacello sold the painting for $230,500 at Sotheby's Contemporary Art ay Auction in New York in 2010.

== Awards ==
- 2017 Paez Medal of Art, New York City (VAEA).
