= Misha Kahn =

American artist and designer (born 1989)

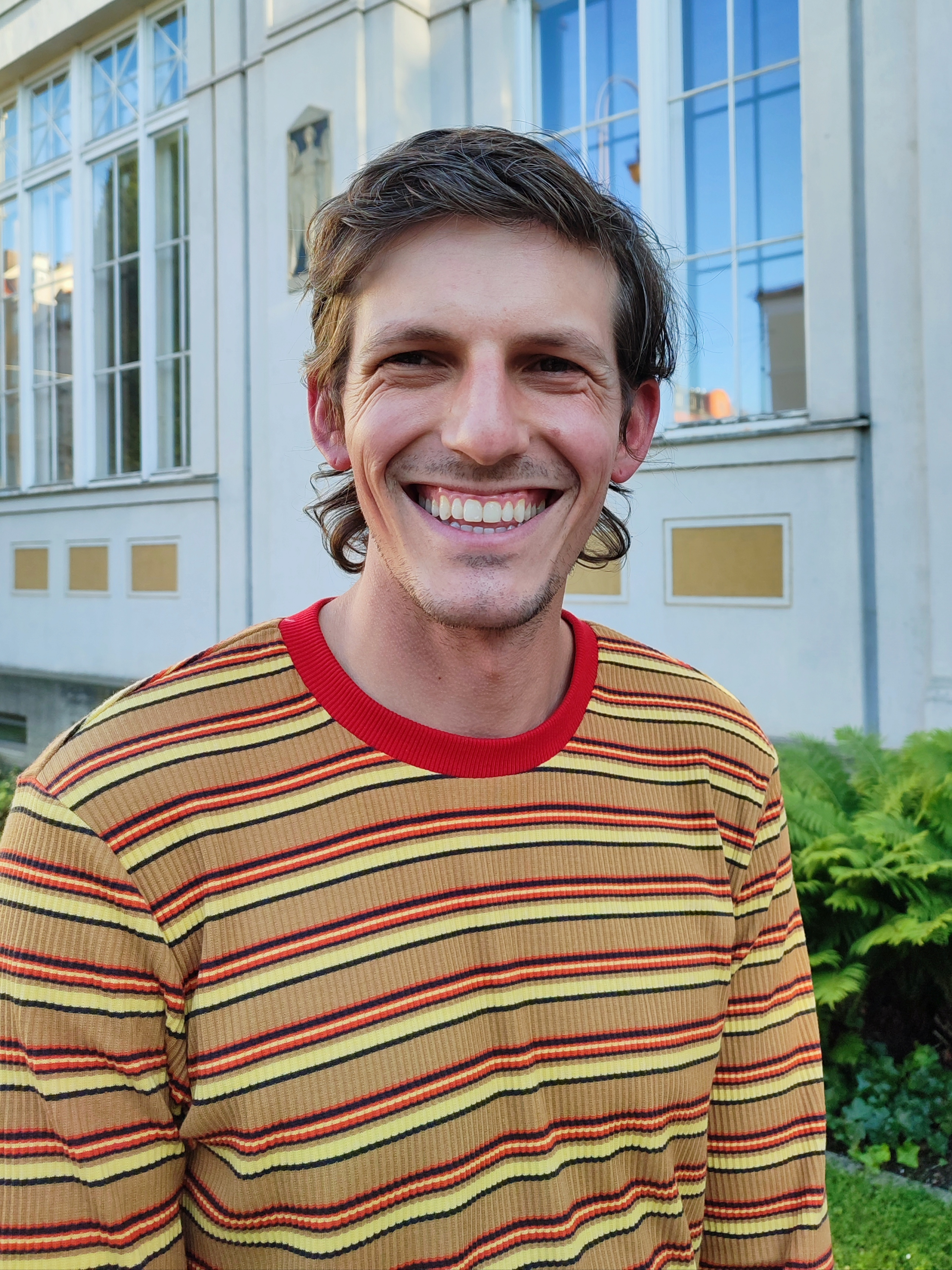
- Misha Kahn in 2022
- Born: 1989 (age 36–37); Duluth, Minnesota, U.S.
- Education: Rhode Island School of Design
- Known for: Sculpture, assemblage
- Partner: Nick Haramis

Misha Kahn (born 1989) is an American designer and sculptor, known for assemblage. He incorporates refuse and found objects in his furniture and lighting designs. Kahn's style has been described as "disheveled, spontaneous maximalism".

== Career ==
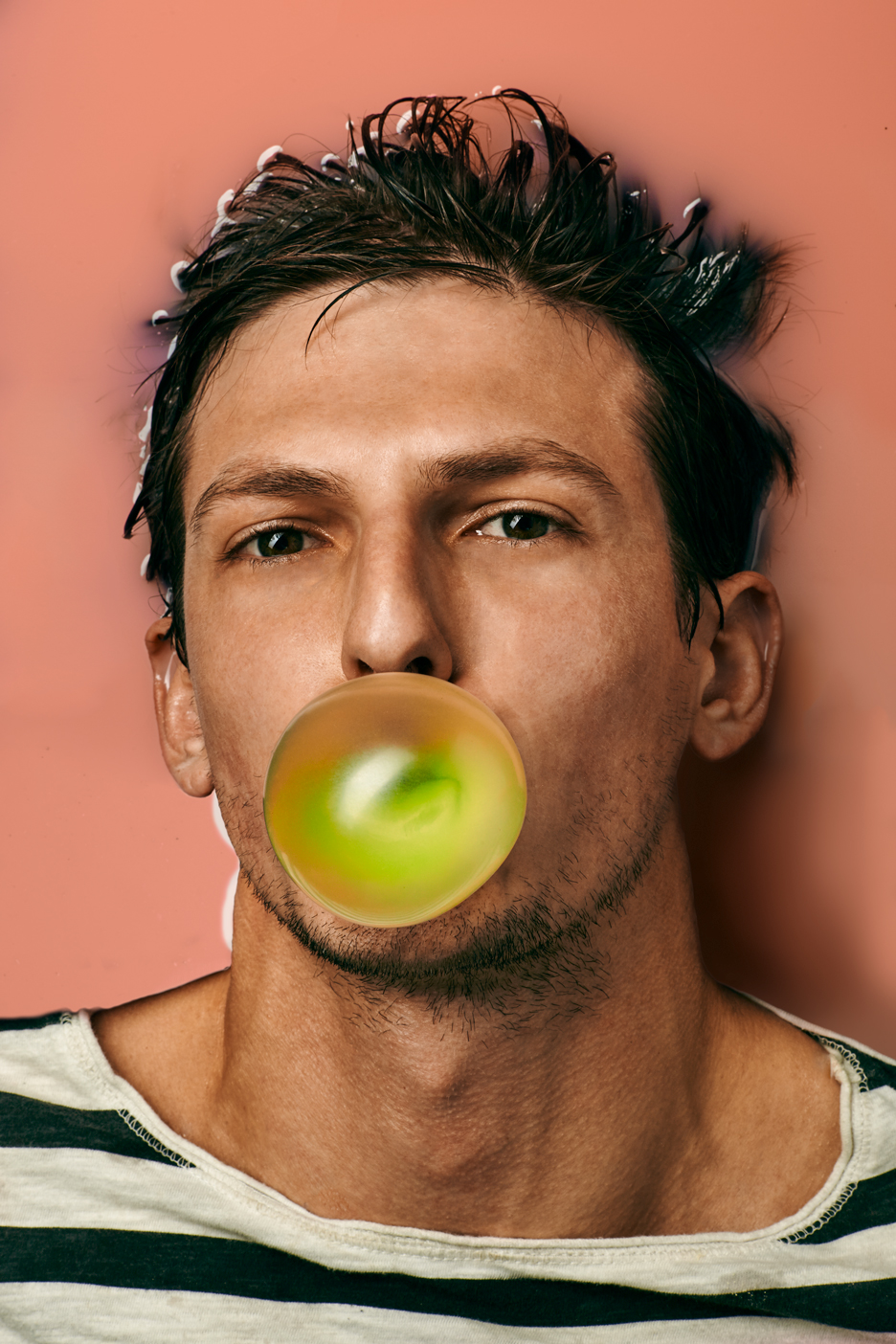
Frame Magazine profile portrait (2016)

Kahn graduated from Rhode Island School of Design (RISD) with a degree in furniture design in 2011. In 2012, he was a Fulbright Fellow at Bezalel Academy of Arts and Design in Tel Aviv, Israel. He was a fellow in 2013 at the Creative Glass Center of America at WheatonArts in Millville, New Jersey.

Kahn was featured in the Museum of Arts and Design's 2014 NYC Makers biennial. His first solo exhibition, Midden Heap, was held at the Friedman Benda Gallery in 2016. He has since exhibited at the Whitney Museum of American Art, the Walker Art Center, Dallas Museum of Art, and High Museum of Art.

Kahn's work is in the collections of museums such as the Dallas Museum of Art, the Museum of Fine Arts, Houston, the Speed Museum of Art in Louisville, and the Corning Museum of Glass. Private collectors of his work include Kelly Wearstler and Peter Marino.

In 2023, Kahn was a contestant on The Exhibit: Finding the Next Great Artist, a reality TV series that aired on MTV and the Smithsonian Channel.

== Personal life ==
He was born in Duluth, Minnesota. He currently lives in the Bushwick neighborhood of Brooklyn, New York, with his boyfriend Nick Haramis.

== Gallery ==
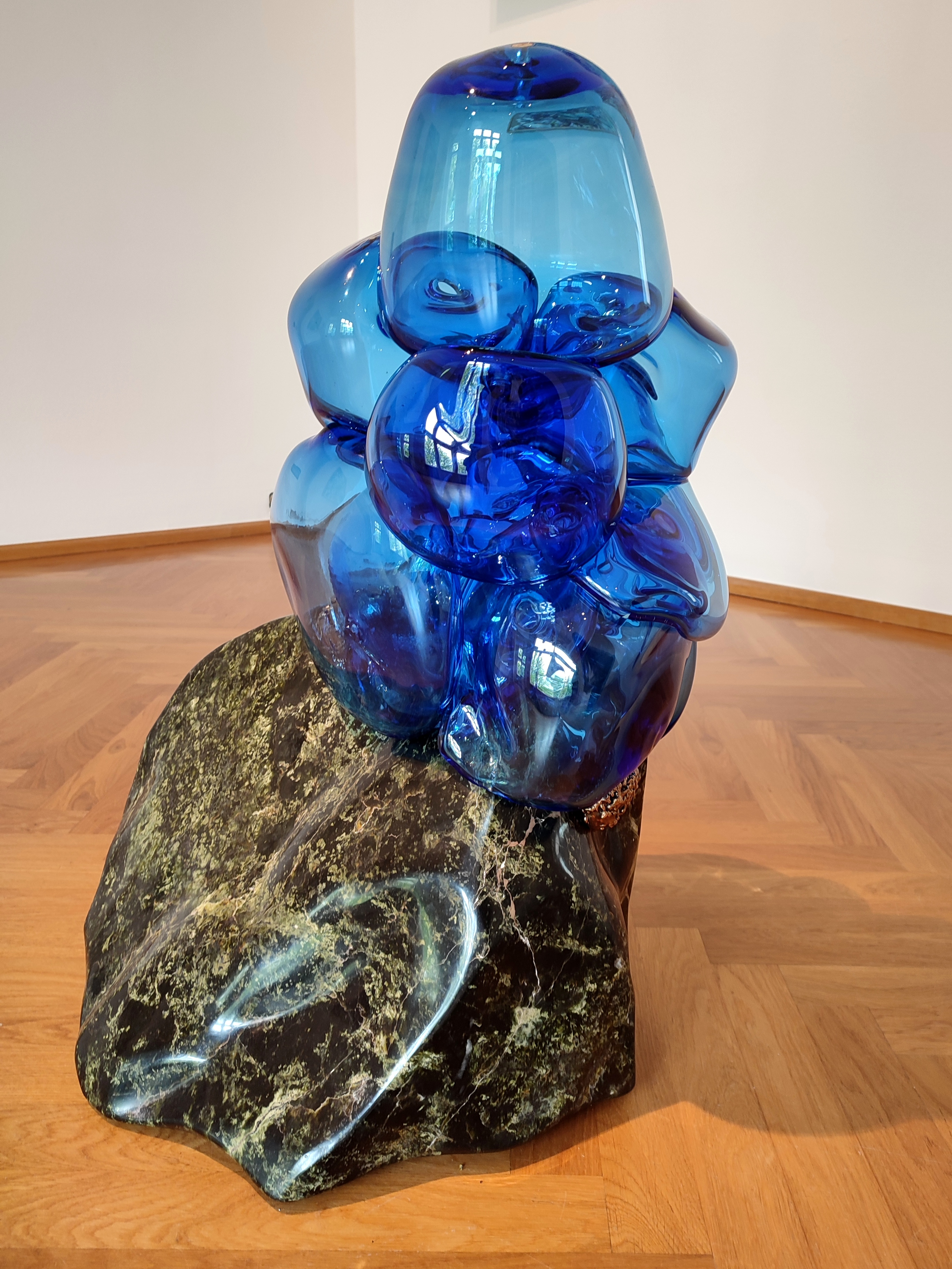
Remember Dreams in der Villa Stuck

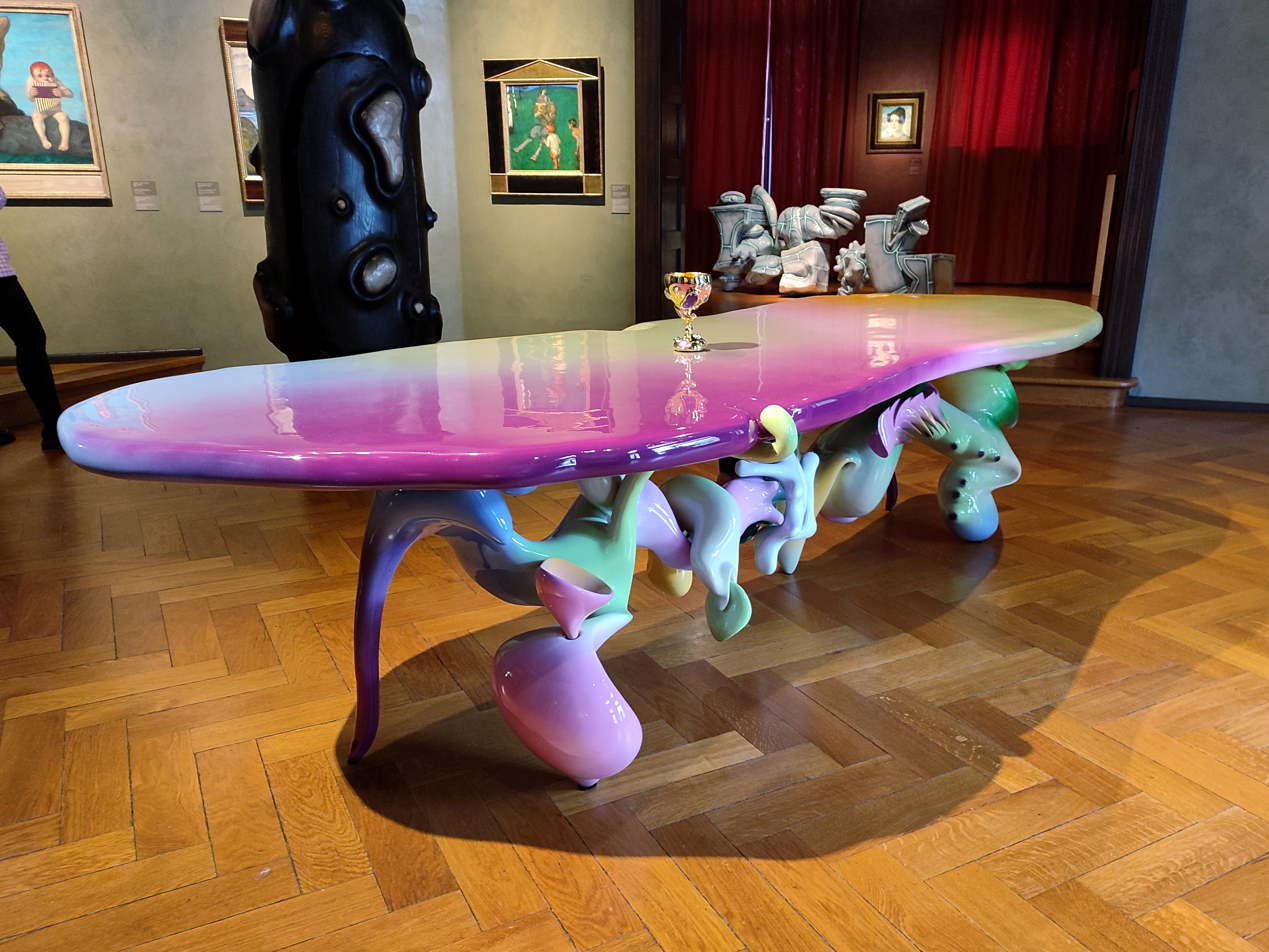
Before They're gone in der Villa Stuck

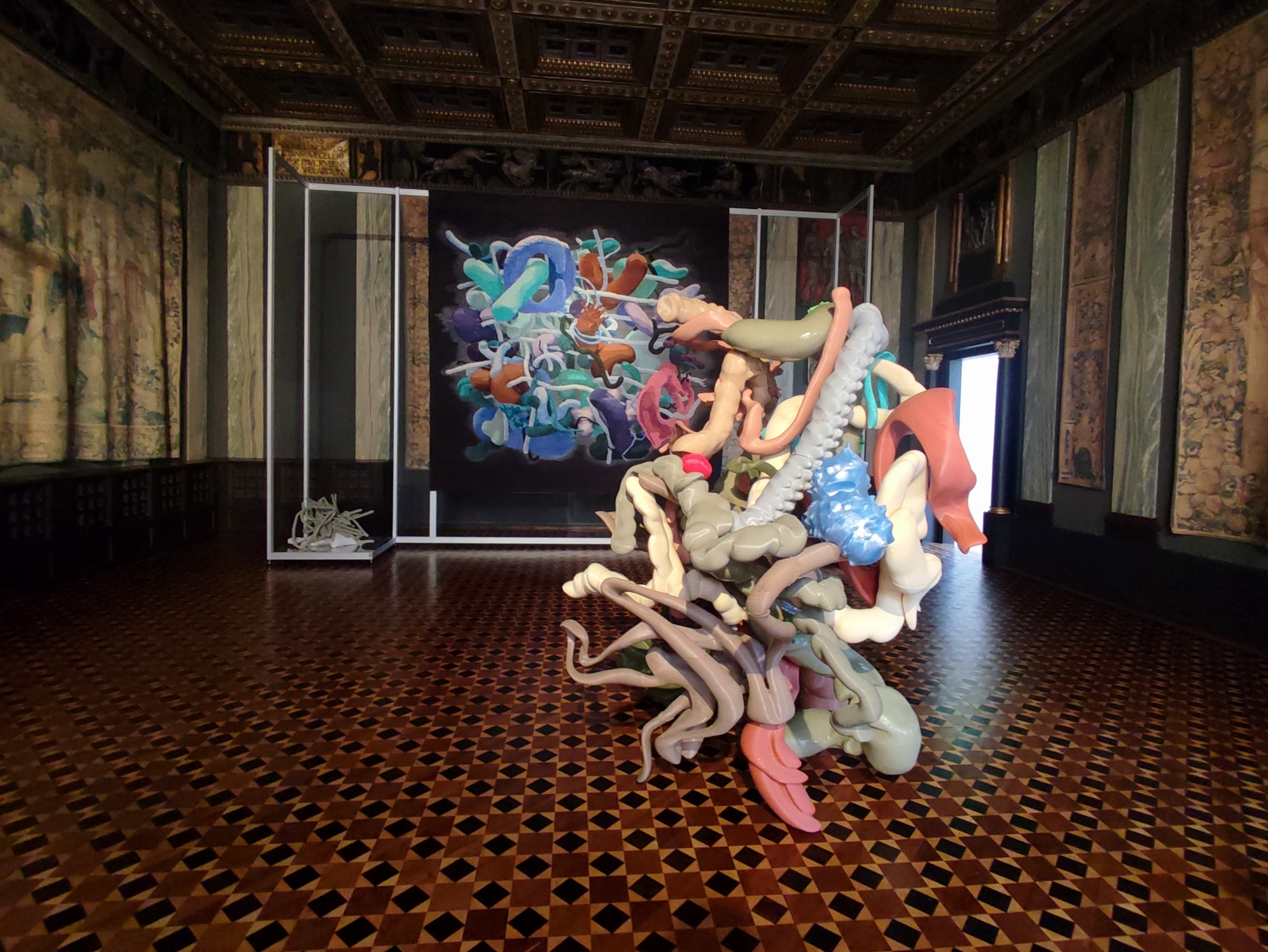
Scribble Weed and Spagetthification in der Villa Stuck

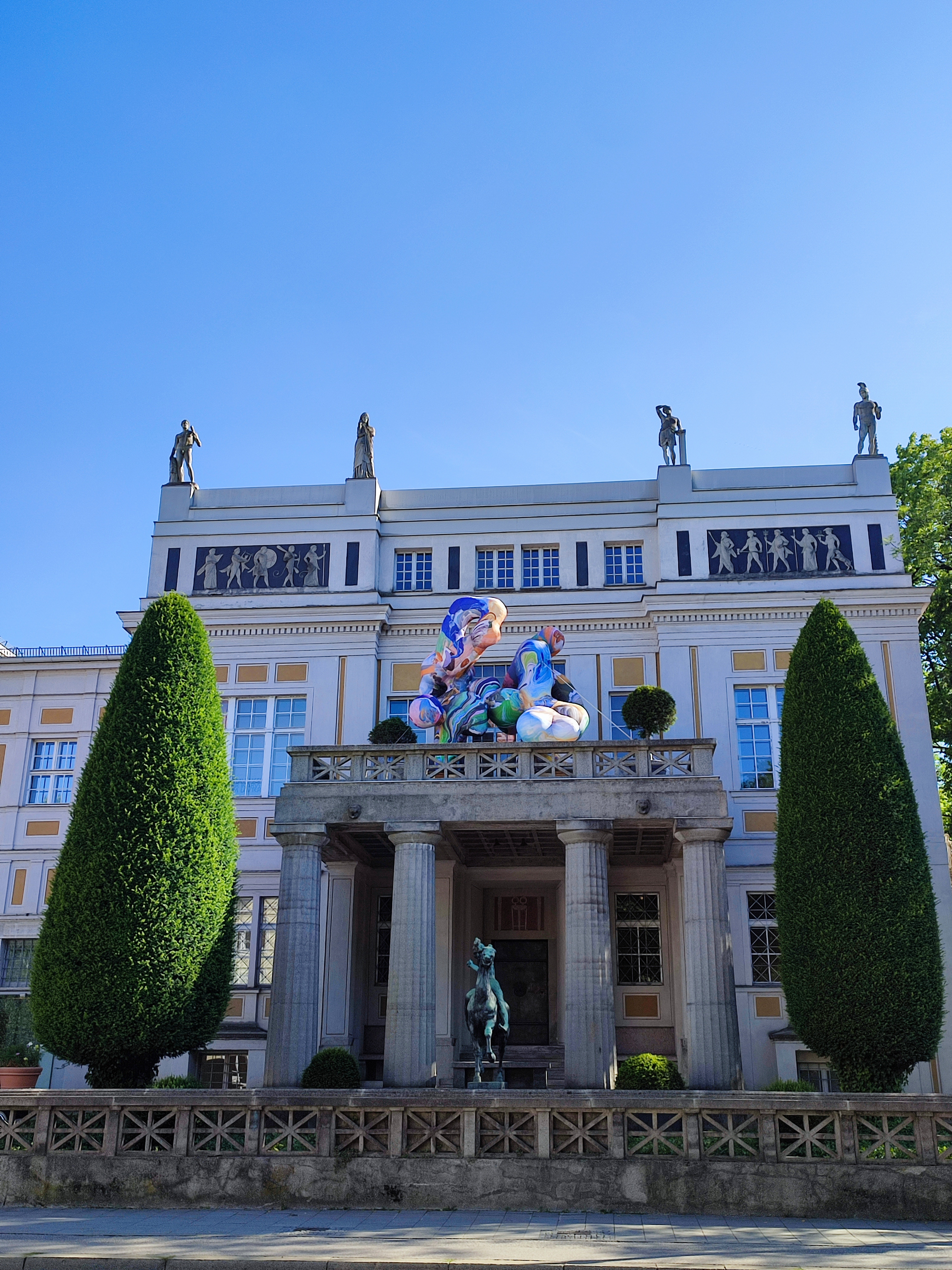
Außenansicht der Villa Stuck mit Under the Wobble Moon auf dem Balkon
