= Frank Buffalo Hyde =

Frank Buffalo Hyde (born 1974) is an Onondaga Beaver Clan artist that grew up in New York on his mother's Onondaga reservation. He began exhibiting his artwork at 18 years old as a hobby. He began taking his artwork career more seriously when he attended the Institute of American Indian Arts. His artwork has been described as “Bold, Culturally Relevant and Inspiring!” featuring vibrant colors and animal subjects, most commonly buffaloes and his tribe. His way of creating his artwork is to combine numerous aspects of modern culture with the internet and technology and combine it with Native American ideas. Hyde has stated that the intention of his artwork is to highlight the social and political problems today's society. In addition, issues in today's society and in the lives of Native Americans is what drives him to continue with his career. His goal for his artwork is to change the way people perceive Native American artwork and abolish any stereotypes that follow Native American artwork. He hopes to teach aspiring Native American artists to make the artwork that they want to make and not worry about their artwork being "Indian enough" or "Native enough".

== Biography ==
Frank Buffalo Hyde was born in Santa Fe, New Mexico, without an arm and a leg due to a birth defect from his father being exposed to Agent Orange in Vietnam. During his early life he grew up on his mother's Onondaga reservation and Hyde returned to Santa Fe to attend the Santa Fe Fine Arts Institute and the Institute of American Indian Arts. Growing up, he idolized artists Fritz Scholder and T.C. Cannon for their humorous ways of poking fun at the myths of Native Americans.

Hyde's father, Doug Hyde, is a sculptor designated as a tribal artisan by the Nez Perce Tribe and whose artwork featured at the Smithsonian Museum. As a child Frank Hyde would often try to assist his father with the making of his sculptures until he was scared off from a couple close incidents with a saw. Hyde soon declined an art scholarship to Pratt Institute to "chase stardom in a rock band". After six months, Hyde grew out of the hopes to become a musician and decided he wanted to go to school. He enrolled into the Institute of American Indian Arts where he was not able to register for any studio classes, so he decided to enroll for writing instead. Gradually, Hyde's interest in painting grew and eventually decided that he wanted to focus more on two-dimensional painting than writing.

Becoming more involved and committed to his paintings, Hyde decided to move in with his wife, Courtney M. Leonard, in the North Coast to begin making a name for himself. After getting the attention by fellow artists such as, Bob Benson and Sue Natzler, and eventually began showcasing his artwork in numerous exhibitions. Most notably, his solo exhibition at the Wheelwright Museum of the American Indian and in numerous Santa Fe galleries. As Hyde's artwork became more popular, Hyde would move into the Museum of Contemporary Native American Art as an artist in residence with his wife and several other artists.

In 2023, Hyde was a contestant on The Exhibit: Finding the Next Great Artist, a reality TV series that aired on MTV and the Smithsonian Channel.

== Select artworks ==
- Buffalo Fields Forever, 2012
- In-Appropriate #3, 2013
- Bison Selfie, 2016
- Bigfoot Basin, 2018

== Exhibitions ==
- 2003 Popular, Wheelwright Museum of the American Indian
- 2004 Bigfoot, the Loch Ness Monster and other Oddities, Cline Fine Art
- 2005 Native American Contemporary Art, Jewish Community Center
- 2009 Continuum, solo show, Wheelwright Museum of the American Indian
- 2012 Works on Paper by Contemporary Native Artists, Ekaterinburg Museum of Fine Arts
- 2013 Cross Currents, Center For Visual Art, MSU Denver
- 2014 Frank Buffalo Hyde, Modern West Fine Art

== Collections ==
Hyde's public collections are included in:

- Smithsonian National Museum of the American Indian, Washington, DC
- The Iroquois Museum, Cobleskill, NY
- The Longyear Museum, Colgate University, Hamilton, NY
- Office of the Japanese Ambassador to the United States
- Institute of American Indian Arts, Santa Fe
- Wheelwright Museum of the American Indian, Santa Fe
- Sprint Corporate Collection, Overland Park, KS.
