= Rosemary Kent =

American writer (1944–2022)

Rosemary Kent (May 15, 1944 – September 19, 2022) was an American journalist and magazine editor. She served as the editor-in-chief of Pop artist Andy Warhol's Interview magazine from 1973 to 1974. A Texas native, Kent was a reporter for the Baytown Sun, The Daily Texan, and the Houston Chronicle. She later worked for Women's Wear Daily, W magazine, and Harper's Bazaar, covering fashion and New York society. Kent was also the author of The Genuine Texas Handbook (1981).

== Early life and education ==
Rosemary Armmia Kent was born in Houston, Texas on May 15, 1944, to Lonnie Fox Kent and Virginia Simmons Kent. She grew up in Baytown, Texas, in the Greater Houston area. As a child, she "lived for magazines to come each month." Among her literary influences were Gertrude Stein and Simone de Beauvoir.

Kent attended Robert E. Lee High School in Baytown, where she was active in student and community organizations. During her senior year, she was named teen reporter for the Baytown Sun in 1961, representing the school. Kent was a member of the Brigadiers and the Student Council. She was the historian for the Jr. Rotary-Anns and secretary for the Robert E. Lee chapter of the Future Teachers of America. Kent was a member of Trinity Episcopal Church and served as the secretary of their Youth League. She was also a Rainbow Girl.

After graduating from high school in 1962, she attended the University of Texas at Austin and earned a bachelor's degree in journalism from the School of Journalism. Kent wrote for the university's student newspaper, The Daily Texan. During her senior year, she covered White House press briefings conducted by Press Secretary Bill Moyers while President Lyndon B. Johnson was recuperating at his Texas ranch. The briefings were held at the Driskill Hotel in Austin.

== Career ==
After graduating, Kent worked on beautification programs for Lady Bird Johnson, reporting for the Houston Chronicle. She helped research writer Norman Mailer's "Of a Fire on the Moon," an account of the Apollo 11 moon landing for Time-Life. She freelanced for Women's Wear Daily (WWD) from the publication's Houston bureau before moving to New York City in 1970.

In New York, she worked for WWD and W magazine. At WWD, Kent served as the editor of women's accessories, covering fashion and society. Her assignments included traveling to Jamaica to interview former Texas governor John Connally about his new home, as well as reporting from Barbados. In January 1973, she was sent to Washington, D.C., to cover the Inaugural Ball.

In July 1973, Kent left WWD to become editor-in-chief of Pop artist Andy Warhol's Interview magazine. Although both Kent and executive editor Fred Hughes, who was also Warhol's business manager, were both from Houston, former Interview editor Bob Colacello characterized them as opposites: "Fred was pure de Menilville; Rosemary was plain Cowtown, and proud of it." Kent sought to make Interview "professional," an approach that led to disagreements with Warhol and Hughes. Kent told the San Francisco Examiner that Interview is a "serious publication. It's not something Andy puts out on acid trips or orgies. That's somebody's fantasy."

Colacello recalled conflicts arising from Kent's editorial decisions and coverage of New York's social circle. Kent insisted that writer Fran Lebowitz should conduct tape-recorded interviews, prompting Lebowitz to quit. Kent wrote a "juicy story" about rock musician Mick Jagger and his wife Bianca Jagger for Viva, prompting Bianca to contact him after the story upset Mick. Photographer Francesco Scavullo had strongly advocated for Kent to be hired by Interview, but the two later clashed over arrangements for her wedding.

Kent was fired from Interview on June 11, 1974, in an episode that Colacello described as "the coup d'état." There had been a dispute concerning the cover of a special English issue planned for that summer. Kent favored featuring her English bulldog, Boogie Woogie, while Hughes preferred English actress Charlotte Rampling. Following a meeting with publisher Peter Brant, who had been advocating Kent's dismissal for months, Hughes arranged for her removal. Associate publisher Carole Rogers informed Kent by telephone that her services were no longer required, on behalf of Brant, Joe Allen, Hughes, and Warhol. Hughes then appointed Colacello executive editor of the magazine. Because Kent had signed a contract with Interview, she sued Warhol. The dispute was settled out of court, with Warhol giving her two paintings from his Electric Chair series.

Kent later worked as a freelance writer and editor for fashion magazines, including Harper's Bazaar. From 1989 to 1992, she worked for the Hearst Corporation as a feature editor at Countryside, a magazine focused on country living.

In 1981, Workman Publishing published Kent's book The Genuine Texas Handbook, a guide to Texas culture and traditions. At the time of her retirement, she was researching and writing a biography of American socialite Elsa Maxwell.

== Personal life ==
Kent lived in the Greenwich Village neighborhood of Manhattan.

Kent married architect Henry Meltzer on September 21, 1973. As Kent was Episcopalian and Meltzer was Jewish, they chose to have a civil ceremony. Photographer Francesco Scavullo offered to host their wedding at his home in Southampton, New York, but disagreements arose over the guest list. Scavullo had agreed to accommodate 75 guests, but Kent had already invited more than 225. The couple ultimately held their Western-themed reception in an abandoned bank in Manhattan, which featured performing chimpanzees on roller skates. Kent's cowgirl wedding dress was designed by fashion designer Giorgio di Sant'Angelo.

After living together in Manhattan for over twenty years, the couple move to a historic home in Asbury, New Jersey in 1995. They were active members and former trustees of the Musconetcong Watershed Association (MWA). Kent also served as the editor of the MWA newsletter.

== Death ==
Kent died, aged 78, at Lopatcong Care Center in Phillipsburg, New Jersey on September 19, 2022.
