= Nick Haramis =

- Born: March 10, 1983 (age 43); Cornwall, Ontario, Canada
- Education: McGill University
- Occupations: Magazine editor, journalist

Nick Haramis (born March 10, 1983) is a Canadian-born, American journalist and magazine editor. He previously was the editor-in-chief for Interview magazine and Senior Features Editor, T: The New York Times Style Magazine from 2013–2017.

== Biography ==
Haramis was born in Cornwall, Ontario, Canada in 1983. He graduated from McGill University in 2007 with a BA in English.

After two years as the Editor of BlackBook, in September 2011 Haramis accepted the position of Editorial Director at Bullett, a quarterly arts, fashion, and culture publication based in New York City. There he interviewed high-profile subjects at various stages in their careers, such as Winona Ryder, Bill Murray, Kirsten Dunst, and Nicki Minaj.

He has contributed to publications such as The Last Magazine, S Magazine, Billboard Magazine, The Wall Street Journal, Playboy and Reader's Digest.

== Personal life ==
Haramis is based in Brooklyn, New York with his boyfriend, Misha Kahn.
