= Keith Rivers =

American football player (born 1986)

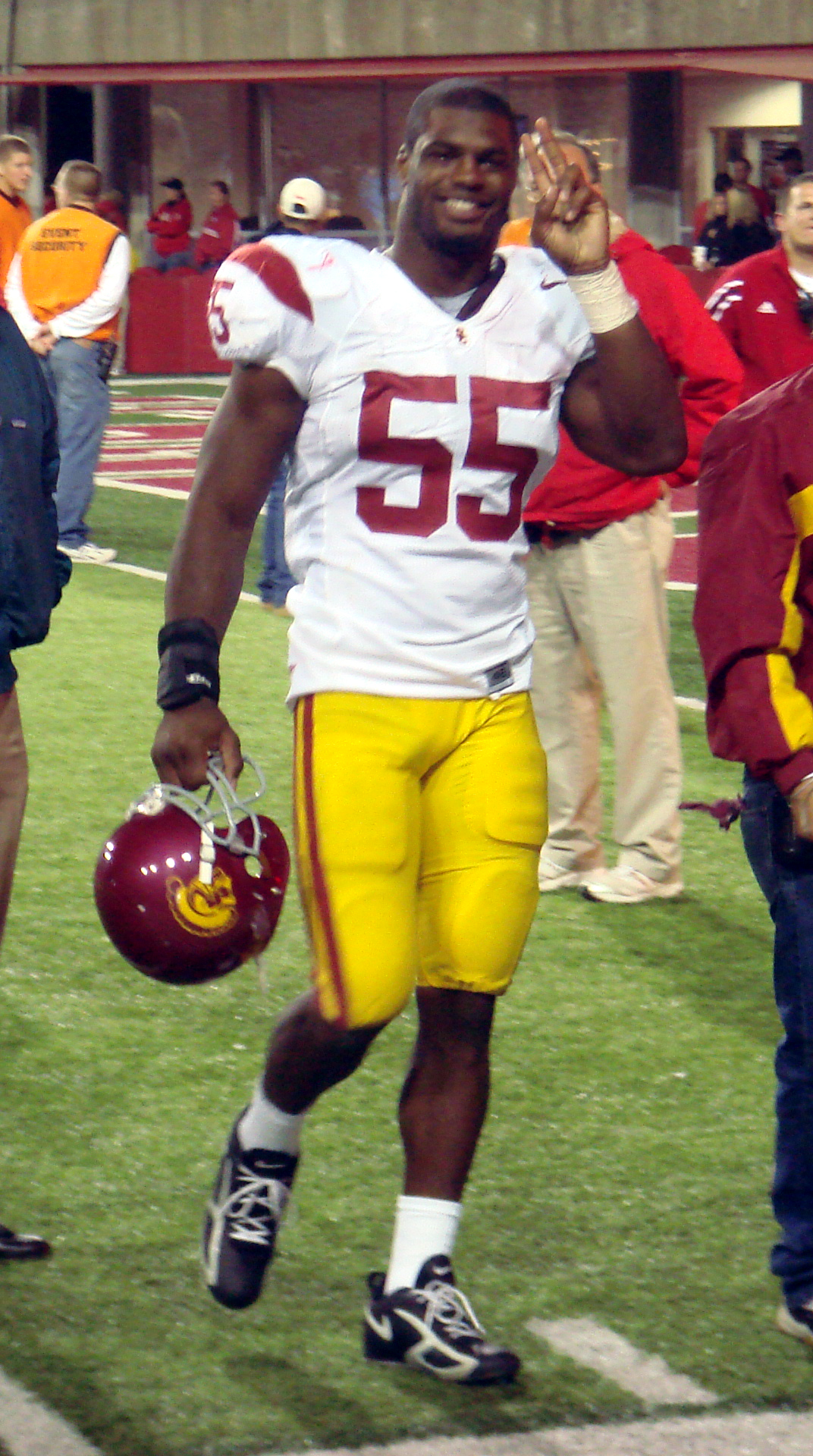
- Rivers with the USC Trojans in 2007

No. 55, 56
- Position: Linebacker

Personal information
- Born: May 5, 1986 (age 40); San Bernardino, California, U.S.
- Listed height: 6 ft 2 in (1.88 m)
- Listed weight: 235 lb (107 kg)

Career information
- High school: Lake Mary (FL)
- College: USC (2004–2007)
- NFL draft: 2008: 1st round, 9th overall pick

Career history
- Cincinnati Bengals (2008–2011); New York Giants (2012–2013); Buffalo Bills (2014); Dallas Cowboys (2015)*
- * Offseason or practice squad member only

Awards and highlights
- Second-team All-American (2007); 2× First-team All-Pac-10 (2006, 2007)

Career NFL statistics
- Total tackles: 291
- Sacks: 3
- Forced fumbles: 1
- Fumble recoveries: 2
- Interceptions: 2
- Stats at Pro Football Reference

Keith Rivers (born May 5, 1986) is an American former professional football player who was a linebacker in the National Football League (NFL). He was selected by the Cincinnati Bengals ninth overall in the 2008 NFL draft and also played for the New York Giants and Buffalo Bills. He played college football for the USC Trojans. After leaving football, he developed an interest in art and collection of works by contemporary artists.

== Early life ==
Rivers was a decorated letterman in football at Lake Mary High School in Lake Mary, Florida. His awards include USA Today All-USA first team, Parade All-American, Super Prep All-American, Prep Star All-American, EA Sports All-American, Insiders.com All-American, Super Prep Elite 50, Prep Star Top 100 Dream Team, Lemming Top 10, Super Prep All-Dixie, Prep Star All-Southeast, Fox Sports Net All-South, Gatorade Florida Player of the Year and Florida Class 6A Mr. Football runner-up as a senior linebacker. He played in the 2004 U.S. Army All-American Bowl.

== College career ==
Rivers was heavily recruited. Then-University of Florida coach Ron Zook, noted for his recruiting ability, made a strong push, including talking to Rivers at 2 a.m. on National Signing Day in 2003. In the end, Rivers selected USC; and, to cinch the pact, the Trojan coaching staff committed to bestowing Rivers, a worthy future player, with the famed USC linebacker jersey # 55 to wear during his Trojan career, which is selectively awarded and has traditionally been given to a promising linebacker with the potential of becoming a USC football and NFL great, and includes past Trojan and NFL star players, all members of the so-called USC linebacker "Club 55", such as Junior Seau, Willie McGinest and Chris Claiborne.

USC linebacker coach Ken Norton Jr nicknamed Rivers "the Shark" for his aggressive play on the field, juxtaposed to his polite demeanor off of it.

Rivers was on the watch list in 2006 for the Bednarik Award, Lombardi Award, Bronko Nagurski Trophy, and Lott Trophy. He was 2006 Rivals.com and coaches first-team all-Pac-10. The All-American selection with 78 tackles, Rivers decided to stay for his senior season.

Rivers was a 2007 preseason Sporting News, Street & Smith's, Lindy's, Phil Steele's, Blue Ribbon and NationalChamps.net All-American. At the end of the 2007 regular season, Rivers was selected to the All-Pacific-10 Conference first-team for the second year in a row by league coaches. He was also selected to the SI.com All-American First-team.

He graduated from USC with a Bachelor of Science in Public Policy, Management, and Planning.

== Professional career ==
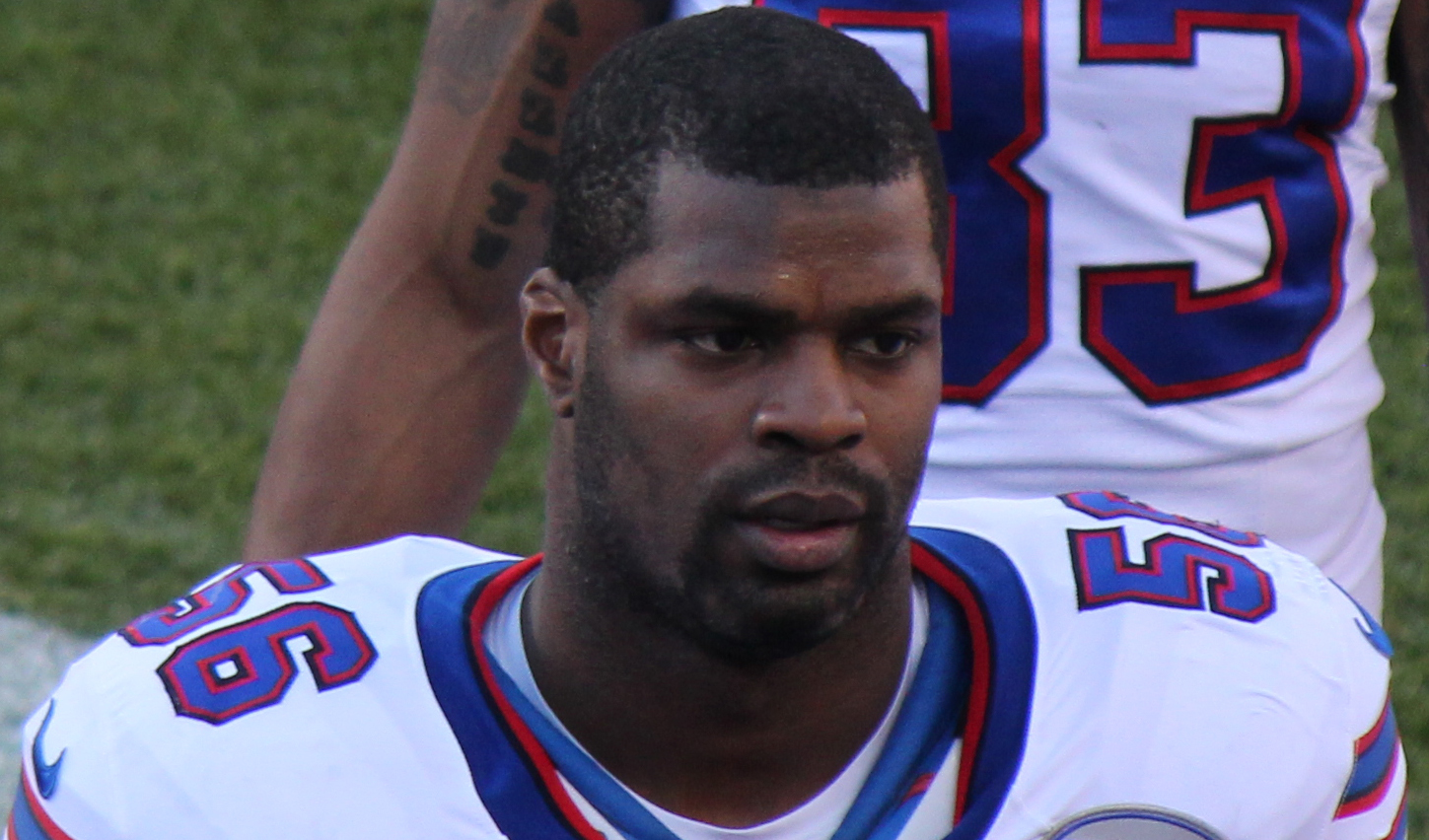
Rivers with the Bills in 2014

Pre-draft measurables
Height	Weight	Arm length	Hand span	40-yard dash	10-yard split	20-yard split	20-yard shuttle	Vertical jump	Broad jump	Bench press
6 ft 2 1/4 in (1.89 m)	241 lb (109 kg)	33 in (0.84 m)	11 in (0.28 m)	4.54 s	1.56 s	2.65 s	4.38 s	42.0 in (1.07 m)	10 ft 7 in (3.23 m)	24 reps
All values from NFL Combine/Pro Day

=== Cincinnati Bengals ===
Rivers was selected by the Cincinnati Bengals in the first round of the 2008 NFL draft with the ninth overall pick. Rivers signed a contract with the Bengals on August 5, ending the 10-day holdout.

Keith Rivers began his rookie season with 10 tackles against the Baltimore Ravens. In the following game against the Tennessee Titans, Rivers totaled 8 tackles. Against the New York Giants, Rivers recorded two tackles, while against the Cleveland Browns Rivers defensive production totaled 8 tackles. Rivers' rookie season was abruptly ended due to a shattered jaw suffered during a block by Pittsburgh Steelers wide receiver Hines Ward in Week 7, when Ward's helmet struck Rivers' chin. That action and the season-ending injury that resulted led to the NFL instituting the "Hines Ward Rule" after the season, whereby it would henceforth be illegal for blockers to land a blindside block using their helmet, forearm or shoulder, to strike at the head or neck area of a defender.

Despite missing the final nine games, Rivers finished his rookie season with 37 tackles, one interception, and a forced fumble. Rivers received the only vote for 2008 Defensive Rookie of the Year that didn't go to winner Jerod Mayo.

=== New York Giants ===
On April 11, 2012, Rivers was traded to the New York Giants for a 5th round draft pick in the 2012 NFL draft.

=== Buffalo Bills ===
On March 12, 2014, Rivers signed a two-year, $5 million contract with the Buffalo Bills. Rivers was released by the Bills on February 17, 2015.

=== Dallas Cowboys ===
Rivers signed with the Dallas Cowboys on March 4, 2015. Rivers retired from football on the first day of Cowboys training camp on July 31.

=== NFL statistics ===
Year	Team	GP	Tackles				Fumbles		Interceptions					
Year	Team	GP	Comb	Solo	Ast	Sack	FF	FR	Int	Yds	Avg	Lng	TD	PD
2008	CIN	7	37	24	13	0.0	1	0	1	39	39.0	39	0	1
2009	CIN	13	72	46	26	1.0	0	0	1	0	0.0	0	0	2
2010	CIN	15	77	51	26	1.0	0	0	0	0	0.0	0	0	2
2011	CIN	0	Did not play due to injury											
2012	NYG	11	44	34	10	0.0	0	1	0	0	0.0	0	0	1
2013	NYG	16	45	23	22	1.0	0	1	0	0	0.0	0	0	1
2014	BUF	12	16	11	5	0.0	0	0	0	0	0.0	0	0	0
Career		74	291	189	102	3.0	1	2	2	39	19.5	39	0	7

== Life after football ==
After retiring from football, Rivers delved in to the art world, deepening an interest that was sparked in high school. He studied modern art and went to art shows. Starting with his first purchase of a piece by Andy Warhol, his collection has expanded to include works by Barbara Kruger and John Baldessari and more contemporary artists like Rashid Johnson and Glenn Ligon. He served as a guest judge in the 2023 reality TV competition, The Exhibit: Finding the Next Great Artist.
