= Ron Rivlin =

Canadian-American art dealer

- Born: December 4, 1973 (age 52); Toronto, Ontario, Canada
- Education: University of Western Ontario
- Occupations: Art dealer, entrepreneur
- Known for: Art dealer, gallery owner, Warhol market reports

Ron Rivlin (born December 4, 1973) is a Canadian born art dealer and entrepreneur based in Los Angeles. He is the founder and director of Revolver Gallery, a gallery exclusively dedicated to the life and work of Andy Warhol. Rivlin is known for his expertise in Warhol screenprints and authentication. He consults for the FBI’s art crime division and is the author of the annual Andy Warhol Print Market Report.

== Early career ==
Rivlin began his career in the 1990s as a concert promoter focused on electronic and hip hop music. In 1995, he launched Daybreaks Productions, organizing large-scale music events across North America. He later founded the talent agency Coast II Coast Entertainment, which represented acts such as Run DMC, DJ Jazzy Jeff, Biz Markie, Junior Vasquez, Louie Vega, and Infected Mushroom. The agency operated for over two decades and closed in 2023.

== Revolver Gallery ==
In 2012, Rivlin established Revolver Gallery in Beverly Hills, California. The gallery is focused exclusively on the art and legacy of Andy Warhol. Rivlin has curated multiple Warhol exhibitions, including:

- Warhol: A Different Idea of Love (Vancouver, 2015)
- Andy Warhol Revisited: A Mirror For Today (Toronto, 2015)
- Andy Warhol Revisited: Thirty Years Later (Los Angeles, 2017)

== Art authentication ==
Rivlin works in authenticating Warhol screenprints. His involvement with the FBI’s art crime division began after he uncovered a forged Warhol consignment, prompting an investigation and further collaboration on cases involving forgery and fraud. His work has been discussed in publications including The New York Times, and Newsweek.

== Loss in Pacific Palisades Fire ==
On January 7, 2025, Rivlin’s home and a portion of his private art collection were destroyed in the Palisades Fire, a fast-moving wildfire in the Pacific Palisades neighborhood of Los Angeles. The fire destroyed over 200 works from Rivlin’s collection, including more than 30 original pieces by Andy Warhol and Keith Haring.

== Personal life ==
Ron Rivlin was born in Toronto, Ontario. He attended the University of Western Ontario before relocating to Los Angeles, California, where he currently resides. He is married and has two children.
