= The Colony Hotel =

Historic hotel in Florida

Coordinates: 26°42′01″N 80°02′08″W

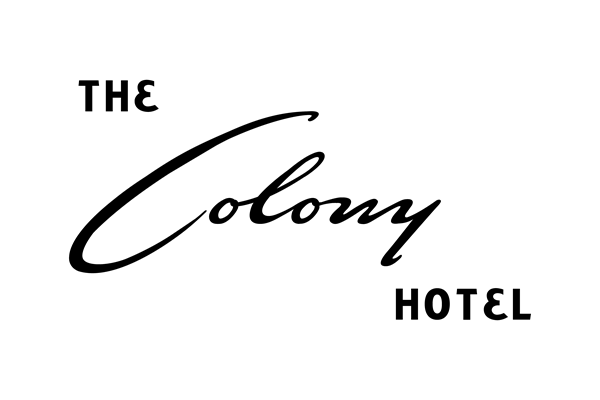
- Interactive map of the The Colony Hotel area
- Former names: The Golf View

General information
- Architectural style: British Colonial
- Location: 155 Hammon Avenue; Palm Beach, Florida, U.S.
- Opened: November 15, 1947
- Owner: Wetenhall family

Design and construction
- Architects: Simson & Holley

Other information
- Number of rooms: 89
- Number of suites: 16
- Number of restaurants: 3

Website
- www.thecolonypalmbeach.com

The Colony Hotel (formerly The Golf View) is a historic hotel located at 155 Hammon Ave in Palm Beach, Florida. Founded in 1947 it has been added as a Historic Landmark by the Palm Beach County Preservation Commission. The hotel has been partially continuously owned by the Wetenhall family since 1970. In 2016, Andrew Wetenhall, an investment banker and son of former minority owner Robert C. Wetenhall, and his wife Sarah acquired the property for $12 million.
