= The Exhibit: Finding the Next Great Artist =

American reality TV competition

- Genre: Reality competition
- Judges: Melissa Chiu; Adam Pendleton; Abigail DeVille; Keith Rivers; Kenny Schachter; Sarah Thornton; JiaJia Fei; Samuel Hoi
- Country of origin: United States
- Original language: English
- No. of seasons: 1
- No. of episodes: 6

Production
- Executive producer: Patty Ivins Specht
- Production companies: PBL&J TV + Doc; MTV Entertainment Studios

Original release
- Network: MTV; Smithsonian Channel
- Release: March 3 – April 7, 2023

The Exhibit: Finding the Next Great Artist is an American competition television series from MTV and the Smithsonian Channel that premiered on March 3, 2023. The show features seven artists competing for a $100,000 prize and a solo exhibition at the Hirshhorn Museum and Sculpture Garden.

== Format ==
Artists are given a topic or theme to respond to in each episode and a time limit to complete and mount their art for review. Each of the six episodes is hosted by Dometi Pongo of MTV News and features a different competition with a panel of judges headed by Hirshhorn director Melissa Chiu and two other judges that rotate throughout the series.Judges consider the "originality and execution" of the piece when assessing the work. The winner of each round is announced following a crit by the panel. There are no eliminations and all seven artists remain through the end of the series. The winner of the competition is announced at the end of the series, and may not have won any of the individual rounds.

== Contestants ==
- Jamaal Barber
- Frank Buffalo Hyde
- Clare Kambhu
- Misha Kahn
- Baseera Khan
- Jillian Mayer
- Jennifer Warren

== Episodes ==
No.	Title	Original release date	U.S. viewers (millions)
1	"Welcome to The Exhibit"	March 3, 2023	0.18
Artists create works involving "an exploration of gender", featuring guest judges artist Adam Pendleton and writer Kenny Schachter. Artists' works proceed as planned, while Kahn struggles fabricating a resin banana. Mayer's and Kambhu's pieces are recognized by the judges, while Warren's work, Baby Dreams wins for its personal elements.
2	"The Infinite Scroll"	March 10, 2023	0.09
Artists create commissions about social media. Mayer delivers an interactive "Slumpie" sculpture with live models. Buffalo Hyde's work, involving a picture on a smartphone, is praised by guest critic Jia Jia Feng as the work she would display in her home. Khan wins the round for her humorous piece that has a kinetic quality and features a photo of the artist with exaggerated body parts, mocking the superficiality of social media.
3	"Survive or Thrive"	March 17, 2023	N/A
Competitors make work that responds to the global pandemic, which triggeres emotional responses among multiple artists as they prepare their submissions. Kahn's piece a college, which involves a virtual reality rendering, is praised for its ingenuity and execution. Buffalo Hyde's abstract work is hailed for its reference to his heritage. Barber, who draws inspiration from the loss of his mentor, football player and sculpture artist George Nock, is victorious for his intimate prints.
4	"Justice for All"	March 24, 2023	0.10
The artists are prompted to create works advocating for justice. After a comment by host Pongo that Mayer's mixed media work about the news cycle is grotesque, judges Chiu and Schachter discuss the extent to which contemporary art involves beauty. Kahn's work, intended to highlight the plight of the endangered vaquita, is noted for its exceptional execution. Kambhu draws on her experience as a public school teacher and wins with an acrylic canvas depicting three chairs with uneven placement, intended to communicate inequality in the educational system.
5	"Futurist Vibes"	March 31, 2023	N/A
Updating a previous work, artists are asked to prepare a piece about the future, which are assessed by new guest judges Keith Rivers and Abigail DeVille. Khan's piece, about her experience with a cyst, is praised for its personal qualities. Kahn is hailed for updates to a claymation work he created as a child. Mayer wins for her installation that draws inspiration from an earlier video and song, "I am your Grandma", dedicated to progeny she is unlikely to meet.
6	"Exhibit of a Lifetime"	April 7, 2023	N/A
The episode contains two competitions. The first competition and the final task of all six contestants is to create a self-portrait. Buffalo Hyde wins for his black and white work that highlights his experience with marginalization. After discussing the strengths of all the competitors, the judges select three artists - Kahn, Khan, and Kambhu - to present a work at the Hirshhorn gala for which they have two weeks to prepare. Kambhu's painting depicts upturned chairs which bears a striking similarity to her successful submission in the fourth episode. Kahn prepares a captivating multimedia work that includes a collage and a lamp but is overlooked by the judges. Khan, who has already had her work displayed at the Brooklyn Museum, submits a work that is intended as a response to the statues at the Hirshhorn Sculpture Garden. She is declared the victor, earning praise from the judges for her diverse oeuvre.
