= Baseera Khan =

American artist

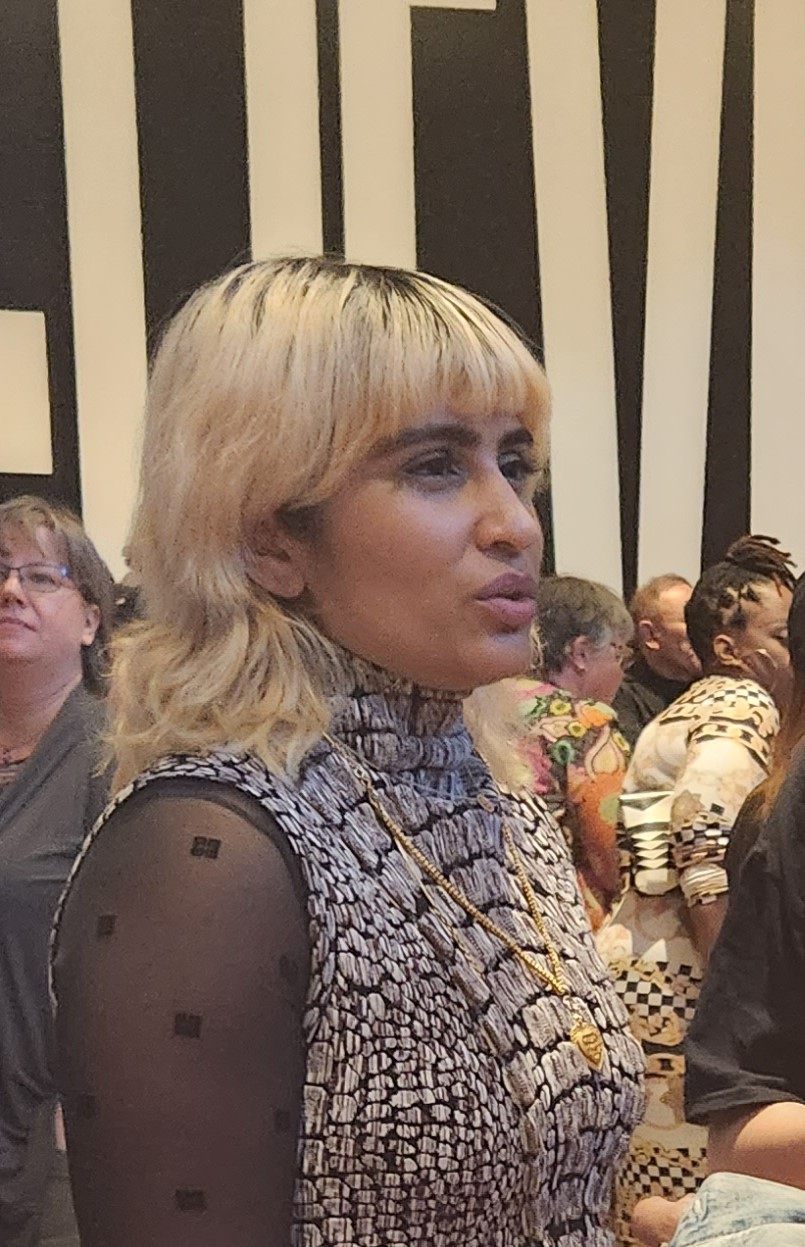
- Khan in 2023
- Born: Baseera Khan; 1980 (age 44–45); Denton, Texas, US
- Education: University of North Texas; Cornell University
- Known for: Installation art Mixed media
- Awards: The Exhibit: Finding the Next Great Artist (2023)

Baseera Khan (born 1980) is an American visual artist who uses material, form, and color to express non-verbal concepts in sculpture, installation, painting, performance, and photography.

Khan uses they/them pronouns. Their work discusses the political circumstances of their identity as a queer Muslim and "as a feminist, and as a brown Indian-Afghani". They are based in New York City.

== Early life and education ==
Khan was born in 1980 in Denton, Texas. They were raised in Denton by working class, Muslim parents who lived in near-isolation because of the threat of deportation. Their parents emigrated from Bangalore, India to the United States before they were born.

They received a B.F.A. in drawing/painting and sociology from the University of North Texas in 2005, and an M.F.A. from the Cornell University College of Architecture, Art and Planning in 2012. In 2014, they completed the Skowhegan School of Painting and Sculpture program.

== Career ==
The Liberator (2022) at the Hirshhorn Museum and Sculpture Garden in 2023

Khan is a conceptual artist who uses a variety of mediums to "visualize patterns and repetitions of exile and kinship shaped by economic, social, and political changes in local and global environments, with special interests in decolonization processes".

In December 2016, Khan was listed by Artnet, the art market website, as one of "14 Emerging Women Artists to Watch for 2017".

Khan's first solo exhibition in New York was at the Participant Inc gallery space in 2017. The exhibition, titled "iamuslima", was named after the eponymous term that Khan had Nike stitch on a pair of sneakers as a way of protesting Nike Inc.'s refusal to allow the words "Islam" or "Muslim" on its customizable sneaker models.

In 2018, Khan was an artist in residence at Pioneer Works in Red Hook, Brooklyn. Other residencies and fellowships include an artist residency at Abrons Arts Center (2016–17), an International Travel Fellowship to Jerusalem/Ramallah through Apexart (2015) and a Process Space artist residency at the Lower Manhattan Cultural Council (2015).

Khan staged their first solo museum exhibition, "Baseera Khan: I Am an Archive," in 2021 at the Brooklyn Museum's Elizabeth A. Sackler Center for Feminist Art. Presented as part of the annual UOVO Prize for emerging Brooklyn-based artists, the exhibition explored themes of Muslim-American identity and the body as a place of shared history.

In 2022, Khan was commissioned to create a series of sculptures based on the form of a Corinthian column – albeit one that seems to have been toppled and wrapped in handmade silk rugs from Kashmir – for Meta’s Manhattan office complex in the historic James A. Farley Building.

In 2023, Khan was the winner of The Exhibit: Finding the Next Great Artist, a reality TV series that aired on MTV and the Smithsonian Channel. Following the series finale, Khan's final winning commission, The Liberator (2022), was installed in the Hirshhorn Museum and Sculpture Garden in Washington, D.C., from May to July 2023. The work, a mixed media figurative sculpture made from a 3D-printed model of the artist's body and plexiglass, was partly inspired by an 18th-century Buddhist statue, Naro Dakini, in the collection of the National Museum of Asian Art.

== Exhibitions ==
- 2015: Walk with Me, Critical Practices Inc., New York, New York
- 2015: Of Gentle Birth, Brooklyn Arts Council, Brooklyn, New York
- 2016: BRIC Biennial, Weeksville Heritage Center, Brooklyn, New York
- 2016: SKOWHEGANPerforms, Socrates Sculpture Park, New York, New York
- 2016: Subject to Capital, Abrons Art Center, New York, New York
- 2017: Standard Forms, curated by Christian Camacho-Light, Art Galleries at The Berrie Center for Performing and Visual Arts, Ramapo College of New Jersey, New Jersey
- 2017: Ritual, Aspen Art Museum, Aspen, Colorado
- 2017: Other Romances, curated by Em Rooney, Rachel Uffner Gallery, New York, NY
- 2017: Sessions, Whitney Museum of American Art, New York, New York
- 2017: Fatal Love, Queens Museum, Queens, New York
- 2017: Iamuslima, Participant Inc. Gallery, New York, New York
- 2018: How to see in the dark, curated by Christian Camacho-Light, Cuchifritos, New York, New York
- 2018: Not for Everybody, curated by Allie Tepper, Simone Subal Gallery, New York, New York
- 2018: Long, Winding Journeys: Contemporary Art and the Islamic Tradition, Katonah Museum of Art, Katonah, New York
- 2018: SEED, Paul Kasmin Gallery, New York, New York
- 2018: Carry Over: New Voices from the Global African Diaspora, Smack Mellon, Brooklyn, New York
- 2018: Mane n' Tail, Luminary, St. Louis, MO
- 2018: ROYGBIV, Kate Werble Gallery, New York, New York
- 2018: I am no bird..., ltd Los Angeles, California
- 2018: In Practice: Another Echo, SculptureCenter, New York, New York
- 2018: Long, Winding Journeys: Contemporary Art and the Islamic Tradition, Katonah Museum of Art, Katonah, New York
- 2018: LOVE 2018: Purple Hearts, LeRoy Neiman Gallery at Columbia University, New York
- 2018: Hyphen American, Gallery 102, George Washington University, Washington, D.C.
- 2018: iamuslima, Colorado Springs Fine Arts Center at Colorado College, Colorado
- 2019: snake skin, Simone Subal Gallery, New York, 2019
- 2021: I Am an Archive, Brooklyn Museum, New York
- 2023: Cloak and Dagger, De La Cruz Art Gallery, Georgetown University, Washington D.C.

== See also ==
- Blacklock, Naomi (2019). "Baseera Khan" (PDF). Conjuring Alterity: Refiguring The Witch and the Female Scream in Contemporary Art (PhD). Faculty of Creative Industries Queensland University of Technology. pp. 78–84.
