= Wetenhall =

Wetenhall is a surname. Notable people with the surname include:

- Edward Wetenhall (1636-1713), English bishop
- John Wetenhall (1669-1717), archdeacon of Cork
- Robert C. Wetenhall (1935-2021), American businessman

== See also ==
- Wettenhall, village in Cheshire
