= Christopher Makos =

American photographer (born 1948)

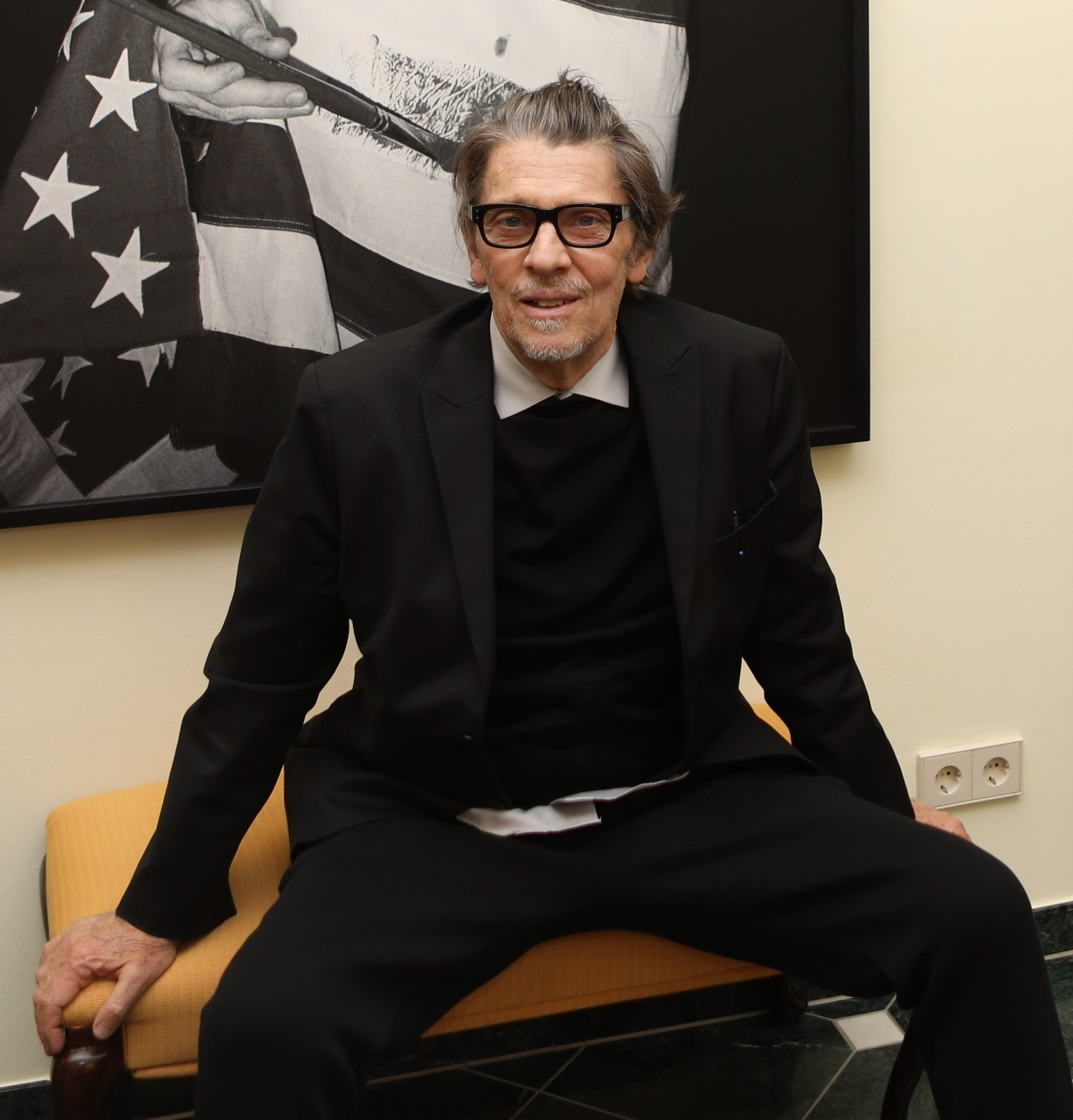
- Makos in 2019
- Born: 1948 (age 77–78); Lowell, Massachusetts, U.S.
- Other names: Chris Makos
- Occupations: Photographer, visual artist

Christopher Makos (born 1948) is an American photographer and visual artist. He is known for his photographs of queer icons and pop stars, and of the male body.

A friend and collaborator of pop artist Andy Warhol, Makos was a chronicler of New York's underground club culture in the 1970s and 1980s. His photographs have been published in various publications such as Interview, Rolling Stone, House & Garden, Connoisseur, New York Magazine, Esquire, Genre, and People. He has had several exhibitions, and his works are included in the holdings of major museums and private collections.

== Life and career ==
Christopher Makos was born in 1948 in Lowell, Massachusetts. After his parents divorced when he was twelve, he moved to El Monte, California, with his mother. Following his high school graduation, Makos drove cross-country with a friend to New York.

Makos was hired by playwright Tennessee Williams to be his assistant. "I wasn't a very good assistant. I lost his typewriter," he recalled.

Makos dated actor Anthony Perkins, who gave him a Nikon camera for his birthday. That was the start of his photography career. "I took pictures and realized I could make money doing that," he said.

His first solo exhibition, "Pictures From A Suitcase," was at the Foto Gallery in New York from December 1974 to January 1975. At the time, Makos had the same art dealer as photographer Man Ray. As a result, Makos was invited to spend a weekend in 1976 with Man Ray at his birthday celebration in Fregenae, Italy. Throughout that weekend, Makos picked up a lot of photographic tips from Man Ray, who advised him to "obey your first impression."

In 1976, Makos met pop artist Andy Warhol and was soon visible in his social circle. Makos became staff photographer for Warhol's Interview magazine, and in 1977, he published his book White Trash, which captured the emerging punk scene. From September to October 1977, an exhibition of his photos was displayed at the Andrew Crispo Gallery in New York. Makos was the art director for the 1979 photo book Andy Warhol's Exposures.

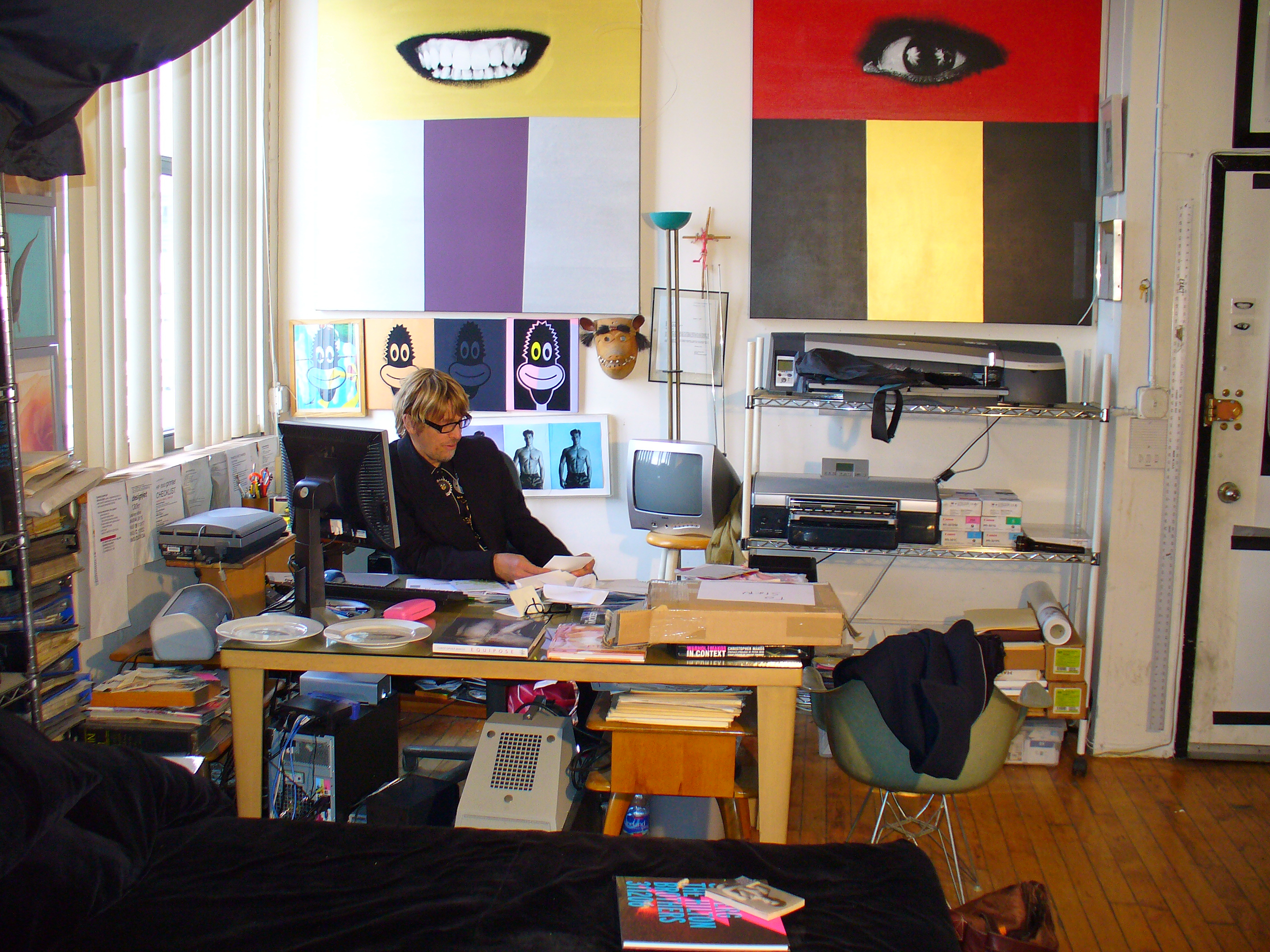
Makos at work in his studio, 2007

Makos dated Robert Hayes, who was the assistant editor for Interview, and later artist Peter Wise.

Makos continued to worked on developing a style of boldly graphic photojournalism. His photographs have been the subject of numerous exhibitions both in galleries and museums throughout the United States, Europe and Japan and have appeared in countless magazines and newspapers worldwide. He has been a seminal figure in the contemporary art scene in New York. He is responsible for introducing the work of Jean-Michel Basquiat and Keith Haring to Warhol. His book, Warhol: A Photographic Memoir (1989, New American Library), chronicled his friendship and extensive travels with Warhol in photos.

Makos' photographs have been published in Rolling Stone, House & Garden, Connoisseur, New York Magazine, Esquire, Genre and People, among others. His portrait of Warhol wrapped in a flag was featured on the front cover of the Spring 1990 issue of the Smithsonian Studies, the academic journal of the Smithsonian Institution. His photographs of Warhol, Keith Haring, Tennessee Williams, and others have been auctioned regularly. Makos' Icons portfolio is a collection of silkscreen portraits Warhol, Elizabeth Taylor, Salvador Dalí, John Lennon, and Mick Jagger.

Makos lives in the West Village neighborhood of Manhattan.

== Books ==
- Makos, Christopher (1977). White Trash. Stonehill. ISBN 978-0883730683.
- Makos, Christopher (1989). Warhol: A Personal Photographic Memoir. New York City, NY: New American Library. ISBN 0453006698.
- Makos, Christopher (2004). Exhibitionism. powerHouse Books. ISBN 9781576872222.
- Makos, Christopher (2011). Tyrants and Lederhosen. Libros de Autor. Madrid, Spain: La Fábrica. ISBN 9788415303121.
- Makos, Christopher; Solberg, Paul (2012). Tattoos, Hornets, Fire: The Millennium Sweden: Photographs. Glitterati. ISBN 9780985169619.
