= Warhol: The Biography =

1989 book

- First edition cover
- Author: Victor Bockris
- Language: English
- Subject: Andy Warhol
- Genre: Biography
- Publisher: Frederick Muller Ltd
- Publication date: 1989
- Publication place: United Kingdom
- Media type: Print (hardcover)
- Pages: 528
- ISBN: 978-0-09-172637-9

Warhol: The Biography is a 1989 biography of American artist Andy Warhol by writer Victor Bockris. The book traces Warhol's life from his childhood to his rise as a central figure in Pop Art, as well as the evolution of the Factory scene and the circumstances surrounding his 1987 death.

The book was originally published by Frederick Muller Ltd in the UK. The Bantam Books edition, published in the US under the title The Life and Death of Andy Warhol, was released in an abridged form. Later Penguin Books and Da Capo Press editions—often titled Warhol—restore the full manuscript and are regarded as the comprehensive version intended by the author.

== Synopsis ==
Warhol traces Andy Warhol's trajectory from his upbringing in Depression-era Pittsburgh to his emergence as one of the most influential and enigmatic figures in 20th-century art. Drawing on interviews with friends, collaborators, and lovers, Bockris reconstructs Warhol's evolution from commercial illustrator to Pop Art pioneer, exploring how he transformed everyday consumer culture into high art and built a persona defined by detachment, curiosity, and relentless self-reinvention.

The book delves into the creation and chaos of the Factory—Warhol's New York studio—highlighting the artists, misfits, musicians, and superstars who orbited him, as well as the darker currents of drug use, exploitation, and fame that ran through the scene. Bockris gives particular attention to pivotal moments in Warhol's life, including the 1968 assassination attempt by Valerie Solanas, which left lasting physical and psychological scars and dramatically altered his work and public presence.

As Warhol reinvents himself in the 1970s and 1980s—moving from avant-garde provocateur to society portraitist and cultural celebrity—Bockris examines the tensions between art and commerce, vulnerability and performance, and the loneliness beneath Warhol's public façade. The biography concludes with an account of Warhol's unexpected 1987 death following routine gallbladder surgery, exploring the controversies surrounding his medical care and the legacy he left behind.

Both intimate and critical, Bockris' study presents Warhol as a complex, contradictory figure: visionary artist, shrewd businessman, voyeur, outsider, and ultimately a defining mirror of American culture.

== Editions ==
Warhol: The Biography was first published in 1989 by Frederick Muller Ltd, an imprint of Century Hutchinson Ltd, in the United Kingdom. Later that year, The Life and Death of Andy Warhol was released by Bantam Books in the United States, but the publisher edited it down into a shorter version of Bockris' manuscript. A more complete edition was published by Penguin Books in the United Kingdom in 1990, and later reprints by Da Capo Press restore the material cut from the Bantam release. Later editions include expanded material, additional chapters, and a more detailed account of Warhol's life and work compared to the abridged Bantam texts.

- Bockris, Victor (1989). Warhol: The Biography. London: Frederick Muller. ISBN 978-0-09-172637-9.
- Bockris, Victor (1989). The Life and Death of Andy Warhol. New York: Bantam. ISBN 978-0-553-05708-9.
- Bockris, Victor (1990). Warhol. London: Penguin. ISBN 978-0-14-012774-4.
- Bockris, Victor (1997). Warhol (1st Da Capo Press ed.). New York: Da Capo Press. ISBN 9780306807954.
- Bockris, Victor (1998). The Life and Death of Andy Warhol. London: Fourth Estate. ISBN 978-1-85702-805-8.
- Bockris, Victor (2003). Warhol: The Biography (2nd Da Capo Press ed.). New York: Da Capo Press. ISBN 978-0-306-81272-9.

== Critical reception ==
In a review for The Guardian, Waldemar Januszczak wrote: "Bockris's biography makes increasingly clear that far from being a weirdo-outcast Warhol was in fact a pretty accurate personification of his country: a one-man America. … Victor Bockris's biography, as true a picture I suspect as we are going to get, Warhol emerges as a shy, nervous, vulnerable man who hid his nervousness behind a carefully constructed facade of cool detachment. Just enough vulnerability continued to peep through to attract those of a similar disposition."

Mary Flanagan wrote for the Evening Standard: "Both vulnerable and cold, he exerted a bizarre charisma, the complexities of which Bockris explores with Olympian detachment. And nowhere better than in the chapters on films. … Bockris's book is crudely and energetically written, replete with extracts from hundreds of interviews with friends, family and the famous. The result is kaleidoscopic, racy, exhaustively complete and utterly fascinating."

Publishers Weekly praised Bockris' biography as "detailed and absorbing," describing Warhol's life as a kind of "sinister fairy tale."

Stephen Birmingham of the Washington Post called the book a "thoroughly researched, workmanlike biography. Warhol, Bockris repeatedly asserts, was essentially a voyeur. His approaches to both his life and his art were voyeuristic, and this, alas, is part of the problem with this book." He added, "The Life and Death of Andy Warhol is a dreary, not even cautionary, tale of a horrid and miserable man. And yet Warhol's work will not go away. There is something haunting there—particularly in the empty-eyed, garishly-colored 'celebrity' portraits of Jackie Kennedy, Marilyn Monroe, Chairman Mao and the like—that suggests the terrible blankness and the nothingness that this Peeping Tom apparently saw at the core of everything."

Peter Schjeldahl of The New York Times said, "Mr. Bourdon's 'Warhol' and 'The Life and Death of Andy Warhol' by Victor Bockris are the best so far in an encroaching flood of Warholiana that includes memoirs by former 'Warhol people' … The one to read for knowledge of Warhol the man is Mr. Bockris's efficient biography."
