= Victor Bockris =

British writer

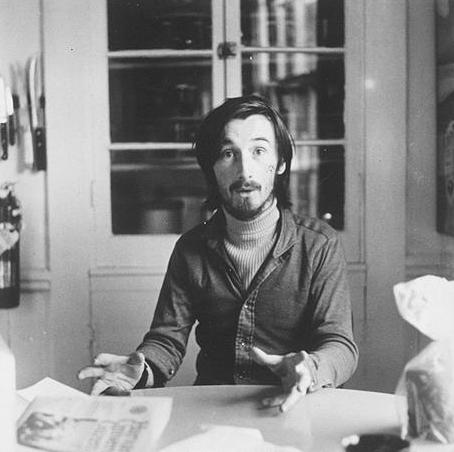
Victor Bockris in 1972, photo by Elsa Dorfman

Victor Bockris (born 1949) is an English-born, U.S.-based author, primarily of biographies of artists, writers, and musicians.

He has written about Lou Reed (and the Velvet Underground), Andy Warhol, Keith Richards, William S. Burroughs, Terry Southern, Blondie, Patti Smith, and Muhammad Ali. He helped write the autobiographies of John Cale and Bebe Buell.

Bockris' book Beat Punks explores the relationship between artistic bohemians of the 1950s (the Beats) and the 1970s (the Punk rockers). This is a theme he is developing in his memoir, In Search of the Magic Universe.

== Life and career ==
Bockris was born in Sussex, England in 1949; his family moved to Pennsylvania when he was four years old. He attended the British boarding school Rugby School and Philadelphia's Central High School.

He graduated from the University of Pennsylvania, where he was a member of the Philomathean Society, with a BA in Literature in 1971. While still in Philadelphia, he founded Telegraph Books along with Andrew Wylie and Aram Saroyan. He also published two books of his own poetry, In America and Victor Bockris.

He moved to New York City in 1973 to work with Andrew Wiley as a writing team called Bockris-Wiley. They interviewed the 100 most intelligent people in the world according to them. In 1974 they published Ali: Fighter, Poet, Prophet, which was the first study of Ali as a writer and a rapper. Between 1977 and 1983 he worked with William Burroughs at his Bunker on the Bowery. He also worked with Andy Warhol at the Factory and published many pieces in Warhol's magazine Interview. "Andy taught us how to interview: Never have any questions ready. Treat it like a cocktail party," Bockris said. As well as Interview, Bockris also published work in High Times, Gadfly and Drummer.

Andy Warhol wrote in his book Andy Warhol's Exposures that "Victor Bockris is a brilliant young writer who only writes about three people: William Burroughs, Muhammad Ali and me. Victor Bockris has more energy than any person I know. He types like Van Cliburn plays the piano. He's always tape-recording and taking pictures. I can't keep up with him."
