= Interview (magazine) =

American pop culture magazine

- Cover of the Spring 2024 issue, featuring Rihanna by Nadia Lee Cohen
- Editor in Chief: Mel Ottenberg
- Editorial & Design Director: Richard Turley
- Editor at Large: Christopher Bollen
- Categories: Pop culture
- Frequency: Bimonthly
- Founder: Andy Warhol; John Wilcock
- First issue: October 1969
- Company: Crystal Ball Media
- Country: United States
- Based in: New York City
- Website: interviewmagazine.com
- ISSN: 0149-8932

Interview is an American magazine founded by pop artist Andy Warhol and journalist John Wilcock in 1969. Initially launched as a film journal, it became known for its informal, conversational interviews with celebrities, artists, musicians, actors, and other cultural figures, often conducted by other prominent personalities. Dubbed "The Crystal Ball of Pop," the magazine played a significant role in documenting and shaping the intersection of art, fashion, film, music, and popular culture. Warhol remained involved with the magazine until his death in 1987.

== Background ==
During the eighteen years that Andy Warhol published Interview, the magazine underwent significant changes in editorial focus, staff, production, format, financing, and distribution. Its title also changed several times: Inter/VIEW: A Monthly Film Journal (1969–1970), INTER/VIEW: Andy Warhol's Film Magazine (1971–1972), Andy Warhol's Interview (1972–1977), Andy Warhol's Interview: The Monthly Glamour Gazette (used intermittently in 1975), and, eventually, simply Interview (from 1977).

Headquartered at Warhol's Factory, the magazine began as a film publication before broadening its focus to popular culture. Warhol described his aim as creating "an easygoing, conversational magazine," adding, "Every other paper is full of bad news, but we publish only good."

Interview was originally published monthly and is now issued six times a year, with issues appearing in March, Spring, Summer, September, Fall, and Winter.

== History ==
=== Andy Warhol period ===
There are several accounts of why Warhol began publishing Interview. Warhol later joked that he had started the magazine "to give Brigid something to do." Founding editor Gerard Malanga recalled that Warhol had been denied press passes to the New York Film Festival, and suggested that having a publication through which to obtain press credentials was the reason Warhol created a magazine. In his memoir POPism: The Warhol '60s (1980), Warhol offered another explanation:

Everyone, absolutely everyone, was tape-recording everyone else. Tapes brought up great possibilities for interviews with all kinds of celebrities, and since we were a long time between movies lately, I began to think about starting a magazine of nothing but taped interviews. Then John Wilcock dropped by one day and asked me if I would start a newspaper with him. I said yes. John was already publishing a magazine on newsprint called Other Scenes, so he had a complete typesetting and printing set up already. Together we brought out the first issue of Interview magazine in the fall of '69.

Interview was launched in October 1969 as inter/VIEW: A Monthly Film Journal, with a cover featuring a still from the experimental film Lions Love… (and Lies) (1969), starring Warhol superstar Viva. Initially devoted primarily to film criticism, the title paid homage to View, the literary magazine published by Charles Henri Ford in the 1940s. The inaugural issue listed Malanga, Paul Morrissey, John Wilcock, and Warhol as editors. Wilcock's name remained on the masthead until October 1970, and he continued printing the magazine through December. He later recalled that after Other Scenes folded, he decided to leave for Europe and amicably ended his partnership with Warhol, who gave him $5,000 and two Flower paintings in exchange for his share.

After Malanga's departure in 1970, actor Charles Rydell joined the editorial staff, while Soren Agenoux assumed the newly created position of managing editor. Agenoux subsequently recruited Bob Colacello, then a graduate student at Columbia University, who had begun writing film reviews for Interview in 1970. Colacello became managing editor later that year and brought in his friend Glenn O'Brien as associate editor. By December 1970, Rydell and film director Jerome Hill became part-owners of Interview. They sold their interests to Peter Brant and his cousin Joe Allen in 1971.

In 1972, Interview had a circulation of 30,000, mostly subscriptions. O'Brien worked with artist Richard Bernstein to create the new cursive Interview logo, which is still used today. The magazine increased size, started printing color covers, and was distributed regularly for 50 cents ($4 in 2025) per copy. O'Brien also added sections on art, music, books, and fashion in the May 1972 issue. The expansion into fashion also attracted new advertising and helped establish Interview as an influential fashion publication. Its first major fashion feature was an interview with designer Halston by Pat Ast, illustrated by Joe Eula with sketches of Halston and members of his circle. Warhol's name was added to the cover and the magazine was transformed to become a "reflection of Andy's social life." Colacello recalled, "We wanted every issue of Interview to be like a great dinner party, where you have a grande dame, an important political figure, a rock star, an up-and-coming actress, and some model."

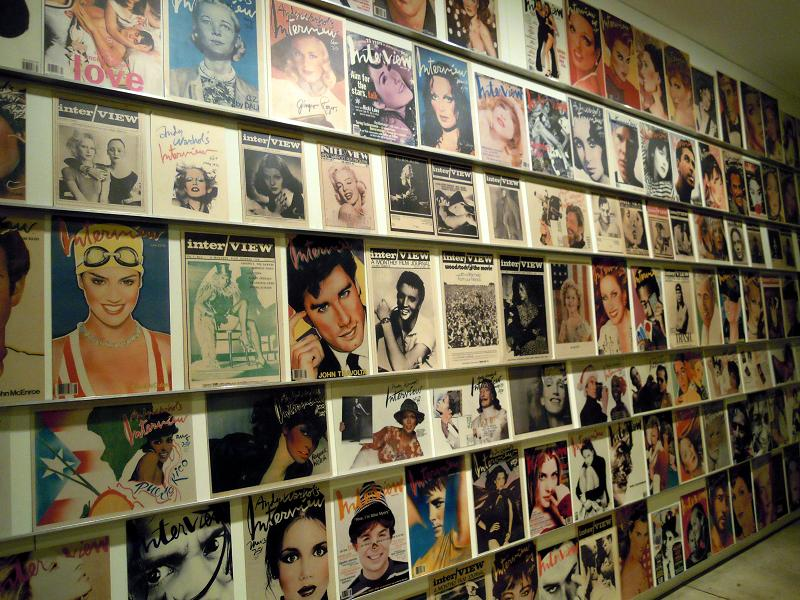
Covers displayed in the Andy Warhol Museum

O'Brien succeeded Colacello as managing editor of Interview in 1972 and continued in that capacity until 1973. In 1973, Rosemary Kent, an editor from Women's Wear Daily, became the editor-in-chief of Interview, which at that point had a circulation of almost 70,000. In 1974, Colacello took over as executive editor and remained in that position until 1983.

Beginning with the March 1977 issue, Warhol name was removed from the magazine's cover following reports from newsdealers that potential readers assumed Andy Warhol's Interview was devote entirely to Warhol and therefore passed over it.

Warhol hosted parties for Interview at New York hotspots such as Studio 54 and Regine's. He used a tape recorder he had in his pocket to capture content for the magazine. The interviews were taped conversations of well-known eclectic people usually at a restaurant and published as a literal transcription. Another trademark of the magazine were full-page photographs of "beautiful people."

By 1981, Interview was priced at $2 ($10 in 2025) a copy and had a circulation of 90,000. The magazine was described as a "hybrid of People and Vogue on elongated newsprint." From 1972 to 1989, the artist Richard Bernstein created the covers for Interview, giving the publication its bold and colorful signature style. Francesco Scavullo, Robert Mapplethorpe, Christopher Makos, Herb Ritts, Mario Testino, and David LaChapelle were among the pioneering photographers whose work was featured in the magazine. Writer Fran Lebowitz had a column in the magazine, and fashion journalist André Leon Talley answered the phones and styled shoots. Over time, Warhol withdrew from everyday oversight of Interview but he continued to act as an ambassador for the magazine, distributing issues in the street to passersby and promoting the magazine at events.

=== Brant Publications period ===
In 1989, Brant Publications Inc. acquired Interview magazine from the estate of Andy Warhol for $10 million. Businessman Peter Brant and his then-wife Sandra Brant were friends of Warhol, who died in 1987, and they had invested in Interview in the 1970s.

April 2011 cover, featuring Lil Wayne

From 1989 to 2008, Sandra Brant ran the business and her partner Ingrid Sischy was the editor-in-chief. Following her hiring at Interview, Sischy operated the company for a few months at Warhol's Factory before relocating the headquarters downtown to 575 Broadway in 1990, where Warhol's onetime partner Jed Johnson designed the space. In 1999, Interview had a rate base of 160,000 and recorded a 13.6% increase in advertising pages through October. In 2008, Sischy resigned from Interview when Brant sold her 50 percent stake.

=== 2008 to 2018 ===
For a year and a half the magazine was in flux, edited by Christopher Bollen. Interview restarted under co-editorial directors Fabien Baron and Glenn O'Brien in September 2008, with a cover featuring Kate Moss. Stephen Mooallem and Christopher Bollen served as the working editor-in-chief and editor-at-large, respectively. The publication's content can be found online and via an app, Other Edition, available on iTunes.

As of 2017, Fabien Baron was the editorial director, Karl Templer was the creative director, and Nick Haramis was the editor-in-chief. In December 2013, Stephen Mooallem left Interview to join Harper's Bazaar as its executive editor. Keith Pollock served as editor-in-chief from 2014 to 2016.

It was announced on May 21, 2018, that the publication 'folded' and would end both its print and web publications by the end of 2018. The publication also filed for Chapter 7 bankruptcy and liquidation.

=== Relaunch ===
In August 2018, it was reported that a company owned by Peter Brant, Singleton LLC, purchased Interview out of bankruptcy for $1.5 million.

On September 6, 2018, Interview announced the launch of its 521st issue. The magazine was purchased by Kelly Brant and Jason Nikic, with some reports suggesting that the title's intellectual property will be returned to Peter Brant.

== Editors ==
Editor	Title	Start year	End year	Ref.
Gerard Malanga	Editor	1969	1970	
Paul Morrissey	Editor	1969	1973	
John Wilcock	Editor	1969	1970	
Andy Warhol	Editor	1969	1973	
Soren Agenoux	Managing editor	1970	1970	
Bob Colacello	Managing editor	1970	1972	
Glenn O'Brien	Managing editor	1972	1973	
Rosemary Kent	Editor-in-chief	1973	1974	
Bob Colacello	Executive editor	1974	1983	
Robert Hayes	Editor	1983	1984	
Gael Love	Executive editor	1984	1987	
Kevin Sessums	Executive editor	1987	1989	
Shelley Wanger	Executive editor	1988	1990	
Ingrid Sischy	Editor-in-chief	1990	2008	
Christopher Bollen	Editor-in-chief	2008	2009	
Stephen Mooallem	Editor-in-chief	2009	2013	
Keith Pollock	Editor-in-chief	2014	2016	
Nick Haramis	Editor-in-chief	2017	2021	
Mel Ottenberg	Editor-in-chief	2021	present	

== Foreign Editions ==
Country	Circulation Dates	Editor-in-Chief	Star year	End year
Brazil (Interview)	1980–1995			
Russia (Interview Russia)	2011–2017	Aliona Doletskaya	2011	2017
Germany (Interview Germany)	2012–2020	Joerg Koch	2012	2013
Germany (Interview Germany)	2012–2020	Lisa Feldmann	2013	2014
