= Vehicle registration plates of the Virgin Islands =

Vehicle registration plates of the Virgin Islands may refer to:

- Vehicle registration plates of the British Virgin Islands
- Vehicle registration plates of the United States Virgin Islands
