= List of U.S. state and territory nicknames =

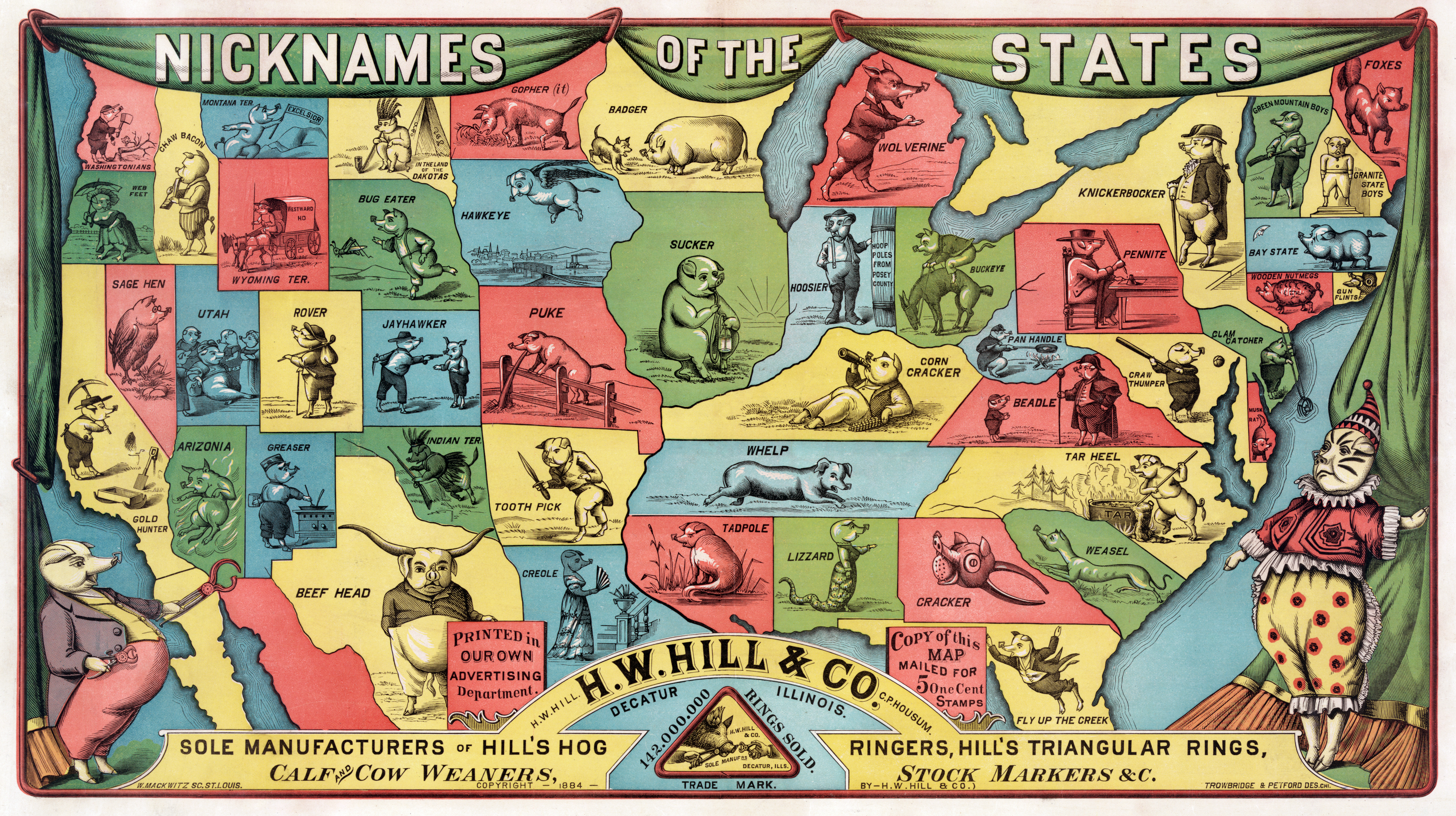
Map of the United States showing the state nicknames as hogs. Lithograph by Mackwitz, St. Louis, 1884.

The following is a table of U.S. state, federal district and territory nicknames, including officially adopted nicknames and other traditional nicknames for the 50 U.S. states, the U.S. federal district, as well as five U.S. territories.

== State, federal district, and territory nicknames ==
Official state, federal district, and territory nicknames are highlighted in bold. A state nickname is not to be confused with an official state motto.

State, federal district, or territory	Nickname(s)
Alabama (Note: No official nickname.)	Alabama the Beautiful; Cotton Plantation State; Cotton State; Heart of Dixie (used on license plates); Lizard State; Sweet Home Alabama; **Yellowhammer State**
Alaska	Land of the Midnight Sun; Land of the Noonday Moon; **The Last Frontier** (used on license plates); Seward's Folly (after U.S. Secretary of State William H. Seward); Seward's Ice Box, Icebergia, Polaria, Walrussia, and Johnson's Polar Bear Garden (satirical names coined by members of the U.S. Congress during debate over the Alaska Purchase)
American Samoa	**Motu o Fiafiaga** (a Samoan phrase; in English, it is "Islands of Paradise") (used on American Samoa license plates); Football Island[s]
Arizona	Apache State; Aztec State; Baby State (Arizona is the newest contiguous state in the Union); Copper State; **Grand Canyon State** (used on license plates); Italy of America; Sand Hill State; Sunset State; Sweetheart State (see below); Valentine State (Arizona gained statehood on February 14, 1912)
Arkansas	Bear State; Bowie State; Hot Springs State; Land of Opportunity (former official nickname; previously used on license plates); **The Natural State** (used on license plates); Razorback State; Toothpick State; Wonder State
California	El Dorado State; **The Golden State** (previously used on license plates)
Colorado	Buffalo Plains State (no longer used); **Centennial State** (previously used on license plates; Colorado was admitted to the Union one hundred years after the signing of the Declaration of Independence); Colorful Colorado (used on welcome signs since 1950; previously used on license plates); Columbine State; Highest State; Lead State (no longer used); Mother of Rivers; Rocky Mountain Empire (no longer used); Rocky Mountain State (no longer used); Silver State (no longer used; see Nevada); Ski Country USA; Switzerland of America
Connecticut	**Constitution State** (used on license plates); Nutmeg State; Provision State; Blue Law State; Freestone State; Land of Steady Habits
Delaware	Chemical Capital of the World (due to one time being the corporate headquarters for several international chemical companies); Corporate Capital (due to the state's business-friendly incorporation laws); Diamond State (Thomas Jefferson is supposed to have referred to Delaware as being like a diamond – small in size but great in value); Blue Hen State or Blue Hen Chicken State; **The First State** (Delaware was the first state to ratify the Constitution; used on license plates); Peach State (no longer used; see Georgia); Small Wonder
District of Columbia	Nation's Capital; DMV (nickname for the broader metropolitan area of the District of Columbia, Maryland, and Virginia); Inside the Beltway; **End Taxation Without Representation** (used on license plates)
Florida	Alligator State; Everglade State; Flower State; Gulf State; Gunshine State (reference to state's high number of concealed carry permit holders); Orange State; Citrus State; Palm Tree State; Peninsula State or Peninsular State; Plywood State; **Sunshine State** (used on license plates); Free State of Florida
Georgia	**Peach State** (used on license plates); Cracker State (Along with Florida, Georgia had been called "The Cracker State" in earlier times, perhaps a derogatory term that referred to immigrants, called "crackers", from the mountains of Virginia and North Carolina) (See also Atlanta Crackers: Origin of the name); Empire State of the South (Georgia is the largest Southern state in land area east of the Mississippi and was the leading industrial state of the Old South); Goober State (Refers to peanuts, the official state crop); State of Adventure
Guam	**Tano y Chamorro** (Land of the Chamorro) (used on Guam license plates); Hub of the Pacific; Gateway to Micronesia
Hawaii	**Aloha State** (officially the "popular" name, used on license plates); Paradise of the Pacific; Pineapple State; Rainbow State; Youngest State; 808 State (colloquial, refers to the state's area code)
Idaho	**Gem State**; Gem of the Mountains; Little Ida; Potato State ("Famous Potatoes" used on license plates)
Illinois	Land of Lincoln (used on license plates); **Prairie State**; Corn State; Garden of the West; The Sucker State (historical)
Indiana	**Hoosier State** (used at various times on license plates; "Hoosier" is also the official demonym of a resident of Indiana); Crossroads of America (used at various times on license plates; used on highway welcome signs)
Iowa	**Hawkeye State**
Kansas	America's Heartland (previously used on license plates); Central State; Dorothy's Home; Free State; Midway USA (previously used on license plates); **Sunflower State**; Wheat State (previously used on license plates); Bleeding Kansas; Jayhawk State; Breadbasket of the World
Kentucky	**Bluegrass State** (used on license plates); Corn-cracker State (reported in 1881) (corn-cracker – the nickname of a Kentucky man; pejorative); The Dark and Bloody Ground State (an allusion to battles between the Creek, Shawnee, Chickasaw, and Cherokee tribes); Hemp State; Tobacco State
Louisiana	Bayou State (previously used on license plates); Creole State; **Pelican State**; Sportsman's Paradise (used on license plates)
Maine	**Pine Tree State** (co-official with Vacationland); **Vacationland** (used on license plates); Lumber State; Sunrise State
Maryland	America in Miniature; Chesapeake State; Cockade State; **Free State**; Monumental State; **Old Line State**; Oyster State; Queen State; Terrapin State
Massachusetts	Baked Bean State; Codfish State (formerly represented on license plates by a codfish); **The Bay State**; Old Colony State; Pilgrim State; The Spirit of America (used on license plates); Taxachusetts (colloquial)
Michigan	**The Great Lakes State** (previously used on license plates); Water Wonderland and Water-Winter Wonderland (previously used on license plates); **The Wolverine State**; The Mitten State
Minnesota	Gopher State; **Land of 10,000 Lakes** ("10,000 Lakes" used on license plates); New England of the West; North Star State; State of Hockey; "Minne(snow)ta"; Bread and Butter State; The Loon State
Mississippi	Hospitality State (previously used on license plates); **Magnolia State**; The Birthplace of America's Music (previously used on license plates); The Bayou State
Missouri	Bullion State; **Show-Me State** (used on license plates); Gateway to the West; Lead State; Ozark State; Mother of the West; Iron Mountain State; Pennsylvania of the West; Cave State
Montana	Big Sky Country (previously used on license plates); The Last Best Place; **Treasure State** (used on license plates); Land of the Shining Mountains
Nebraska	Antelope State; Beef State (previously used on license plates); **Cornhusker State** (previously used on license plates); Bug-eating State; Blackwater State; The Good Life (as seen on state border signs); Tree Planters State (formerly the official state nickname)
Nevada	Battle Born State (refers to the fact that Nevada joined the Union during the Civil War); Sagebrush State; **Silver State** (previously used on license plates); Casino State
New Hampshire	**Granite State**; The Live Free or Die State (official motto; "Live Free or Die" used on license plates); Mother of Rivers; White Mountain State; Switzerland of America
New Jersey	**Garden State** (used on license plates); Garbage State (pejorative); **The Cornerstone State** (used colloquially, especially with reference to Pennsylvania when it is called the Keystone State); The Crossroads of the Revolution (previously used on license plates); Armpit of America (pejorative); The Suburban State
New Mexico	**Land of Enchantment** (used on license plates); Land of Sunshine (predates "Land of Enchantment"; this earlier nickname highlighted the large percentage of sunshine received statewide); Land of Entrapment
New York	**Empire State** (previously used on license plates); Excelsior State (official motto; "Excelsior" used on license plates); Apple State; Dairy State
North Carolina	First in Flight (used on license plates; the Wright Flyer made the first ever aircraft flight near Kitty Hawk, North Carolina); First in Freedom; Old North State; **Tar Heel State**; Turpentine State; Variety Vacationland
North Dakota	Flickertail State; **Peace Garden State** (used on license plates; not to be confused with New Jersey's "Garden State" slogan); Rough Rider State; Sioux State; Heaven on Earth
Northern Mariana Islands	Håfa Adai (a Chamorro phrase; in English, it is "Hello") (used on Northern Mariana Islands license plates) (Note: Though this phrase is used on license plates, it is unclear if it is the official nickname of the Northern Mariana Islands.); America's Best Kept Secret
Ohio	**Buckeye State**; Birthplace of Aviation (used on license plates; the Wright brothers were originally from Ohio. Their first flight was near Kittyhawk, NC); The Heart of It All (formerly used on license plates)
Oklahoma	Native America (used on license plates); Land of the Red Man; **Sooner State**
Oregon	**Beaver State**; Pacific Wonderland (previously used on license plates and available on an extra cost plate); Webfoot State
Pennsylvania	**Keystone State** (previously used on license plates); Quaker State; Coal State; Railroad State; Elk State
Puerto Rico	**Isla del Encanto** ("Island of Enchantment") (used on license plates); Borinquen (name given by indigenous people, the Tainos)
Rhode Island	Little Rhody; **Ocean State** (used on license plates); Rogues Island; The Licentious Republic; Smallest State
South Carolina	**Palmetto State**; Iodine Products State (no longer used) (previously used on license plates)
South Dakota	Artesian State; Blizzard State; Coyote State; Land of Infinite Variety; **The Mount Rushmore State** (officially adopted in 1980 in place of the former nickname of Coyote State); Sunshine State (no longer used; see Florida)
Tennessee	Big Bend State (refers to the Tennessee River); Butternut State (refers to the tan color of the uniforms worn by Tennessee soldiers in the American Civil War); Hog and Hominy State; The Mother of Southwestern Statesmen; **Volunteer State** (used on license plates)
Texas	**Lone Star State** (used on license plates)
U.S. Virgin Islands	America's Caribbean (used on U.S. Virgin Islands license plates until 2015); American Paradise
Utah	**Beehive State**; Crossroads of the West – Location the Golden Spike was driven into the railroad, the joining point of the First transcontinental railroad.; Mormon State; Friendly State (formerly used on license plates)
Vermont	**Green Mountain State** (used on license plates); The Maple State; The Brave Little State of Vermont
Virginia	Mother of Presidents; Mother of States; **The Old Dominion**
Washington	Evergreen State (used on license plates)
West Virginia	**Mountain State** (previously used on license plates); Panhandle State; The Switzerland of America; Almost Heaven
Wisconsin	**Badger State**; America's Dairyland (used on license plates); The Copper State (historical); Traitor State (historical World War I); The Dairy State; The Cheese State
Wyoming	Cowboy State; **Equality State**; Forever West (on highway welcome signs)

== See also ==
- List of U.S. state and territory mottos
- List of demonyms for U.S. states
- List of city nicknames in the United States
- List of provincial and territorial nicknames in Canada
- Lists of nicknames: nickname list articles on Wikipedia
