= Empire State =

Nickname for New York state

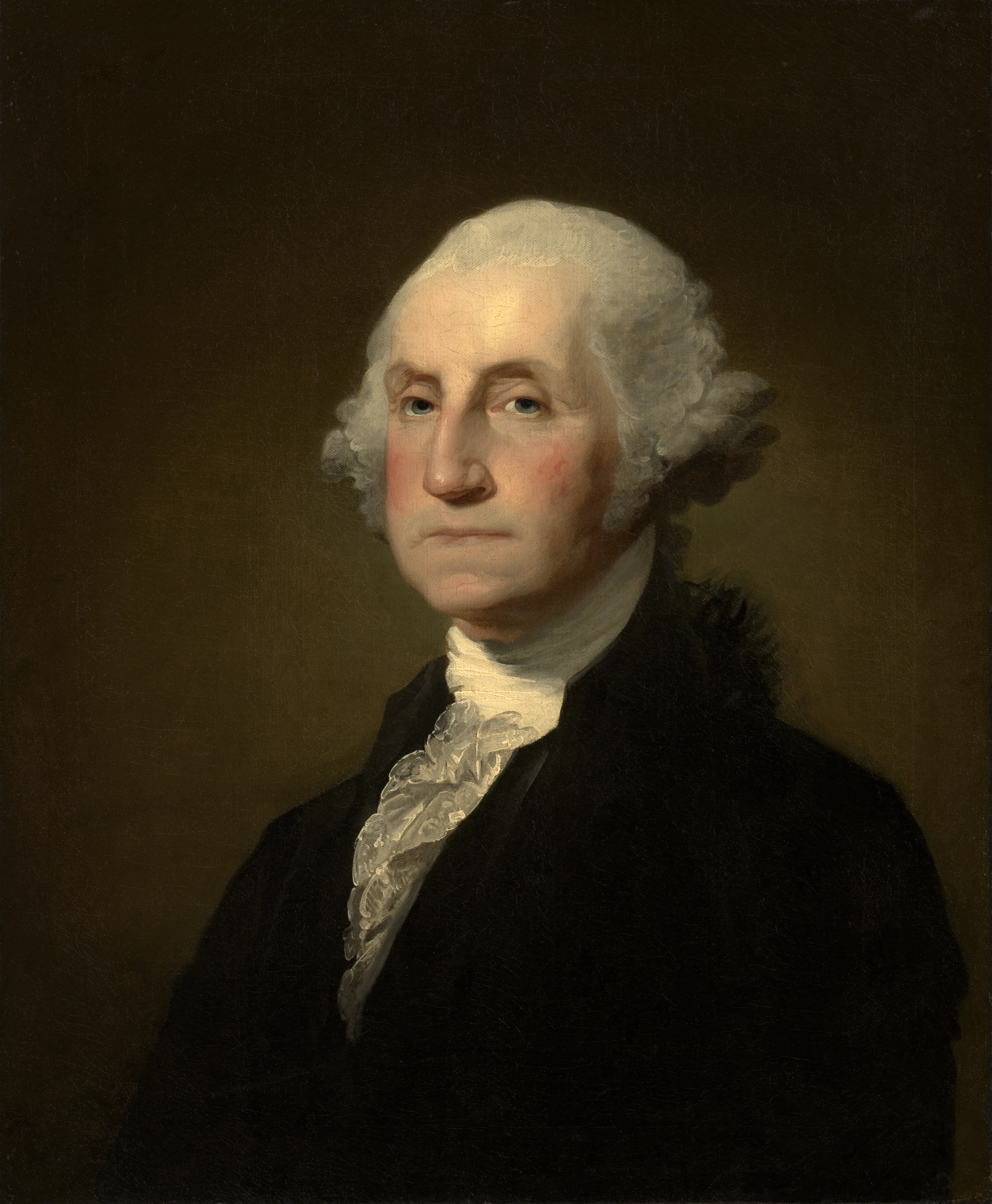
One theory credits George Washington with coining the term "Empire State".

The Empire State is a nickname for the U.S. state of New York, adopted in the 1800s. It has been incorporated into the names of several state buildings and events.

The source of the nickname is unknown and has puzzled many historians; as American writer Paul Eldridge put it, "Who was the merry wag who crowned the State ... [as the Empire State]? New York would certainly raise a monument to his memory, but he made his grandiose gesture and vanished forever."

== History ==
The source of the term "Empire State" has been attributed to the state's wealth and resources. The 1940 Guide to the Empire State states that "it would gratify the people of New York if they could discover who first dared that spacious adjective." Historian Milton M. Klein proposed that the name may have accompanied the success of the Black Ball Line in 1818 "because of the signal advantage the regularity of shipping gave to New York's merchants over those in other coastal cities." He claims that, by 1820, it was clear that "Empire State" was in wide use, though he is doubtful that a clear origin of the term will ever be determined.

George Washington in a 1785 letter to James Duane, New York City Mayor, called New York "the Seat of the Empire." Washington is said to have used the phrase "Pathway to Empire" when referring to the state in conversation with George Clinton, the New York Governor in the 1790s. It is claimed in volume 6 of Alexander Flick's "History of the State of New York" that the title was used as early as 1819, coinciding with New York surpassing Virginia in population and was "universally acknowledged and accepted" by 1825.

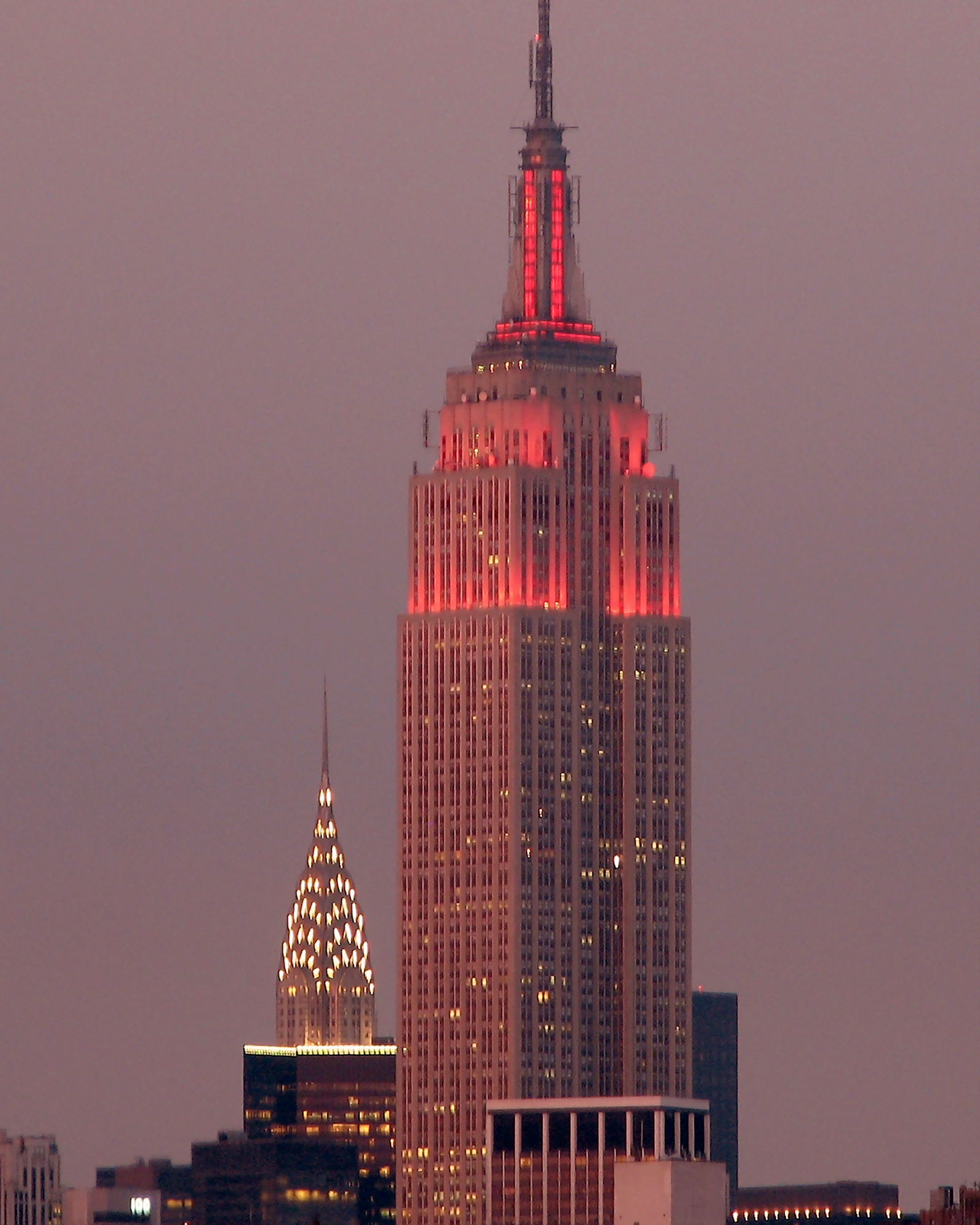
The Empire State Building (1931) is the best-known application of the nickname.

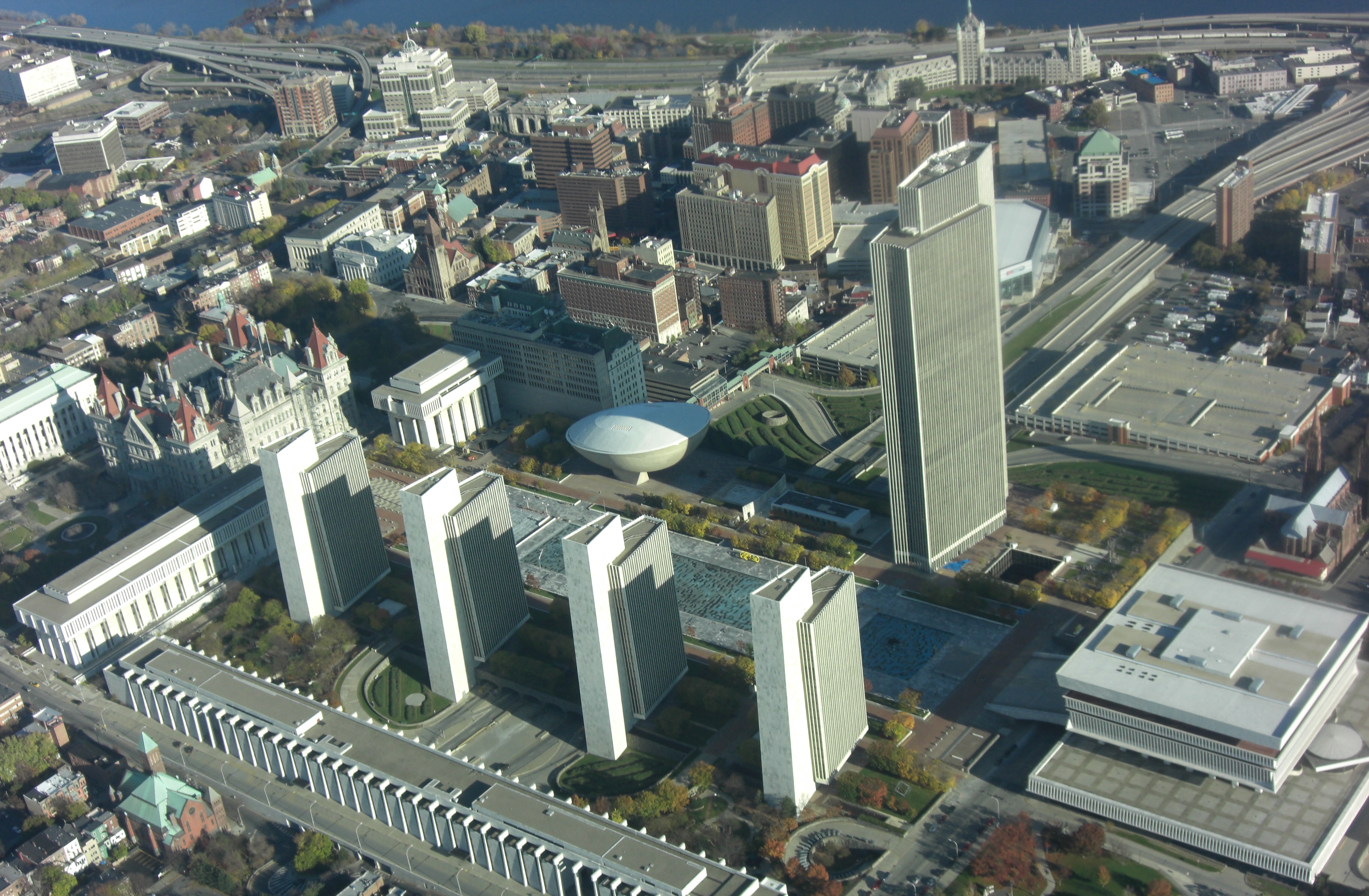
The Empire State Plaza (constructed 1959–1976) houses much of the New York State government.

Buildings and institutions inspired by the "Empire State" sobriquet include:

- The Empire State Building, opened in 1931.
- The Empire State Trail, completed in 2020.
- The 1939 New York World's Fair dubbed the span between the Trylon and N.Y. State Exhibit as The Empire State Bridge.
- The main offices of state government are located at the Empire State Plaza in Albany, the state capital.
- Georgia was known as the "Empire State of the South" during the antebellum period (before the American Civil War). During this time, Georgia had the second-largest land area of any state east of the Mississippi River, and it was rapidly industrializing.
- Illinois is nicknamed the "Inland Empire State".
- The Empire State Express of the New York Central Railroad.
- The Empire Service, a rail line from New York City to Niagara Falls via Albany.
- SUNY Empire State College was established in 1971 in Saratoga Springs.
- The Empire State Games were established in 1978 as an Olympic-style competition for amateur athletes from New York.
- "Empire State" was on New York license plates from 1951 through 1963 and from 2001 through 2020.

== See also ==
- American Empire
- History of New York
- List of U.S. state and territory nicknames
- Empire (apple)
