= Vehicle registration plates of the United States Virgin Islands =

United States Virgin Islands vehicle license plates

The United States Virgin Islands
- Country: United States
- Country code: USA

Current series
- Slogan: 175th Emancipation
- Size: 12 in × 6 in 30 cm × 15 cm
- Material: Aluminum
- Serial format: ABC 123 (coded by island of issuance)
- Introduced: March 1, 2023

History
- First issued: 1917

The U.S. unincorporated territory of the United States Virgin Islands first required its residents to register their motor vehicles and display license plates in 1917.

== Passenger baseplates ==
=== 1917 to 1967 ===
In 1956, the United States, Canada, and Mexico came to an agreement with the American Association of Motor Vehicle Administrators, the Automobile Manufacturers Association and the National Safety Council that standardized the size for license plates for vehicles (except those for motorcycles) at 6 inches (15 cm) in height by 12 inches (30 cm) in width, with standardized mounting holes. The U.S. Virgin Islands also adopted these standards in 1956, having issued plates 6 inches in height by 12 inches in width (with non-standard mounting holes) since 1952.

Image	Dates issued	Design	Slogan	Serial format	Serials issued	Notes
	1929	Off-white on black	none	123		
123	1932	White on dark blue	none	123		
123	1933	White on maroon	none	123		
123	1934	White on dark blue	none	123		
123	1935	Dark blue on white	none	123		
123	1936	Yellow on red	none	123		
123	1937	Yellow on black	none	123		
123	1938	Black on white	none	123		
	1939	White on maroon	none	C-123; T-123	Coded by island of issuance	'C' was used on St. Croix, and 'T' on St. Thomas and St. John. This practice continued until 1975.
	1940	White on black	none	C-123; T-123	Coded by island of issuance	
	1941	Blue on white	none	C-123; T-123	Coded by island of issuance	
	1942–44	White on blue	none	C-123; T-123	Coded by island of issuance	Revalidated for 1943 with yellow tabs, and for 1944 with windshield stickers.
	1945	White on blue	none	C-123; T-123	Coded by island of issuance	
	1946	Blue on ivory	none	C-123; T-123	Coded by island of issuance	
	1947	Off-white on black	none	C-123; T-123	Coded by island of issuance	
	1948	Blue on ivory	none	C-123; T-123	Coded by island of issuance	
	1949	Silver on black	none	C-123; T-123	Coded by island of issuance	
	1950	Black on yellow	none	C-123; T-123	Coded by island of issuance	
	1951	Black on orange	none	C-123; T-123	Coded by island of issuance	
	1952	Yellow on green	Tropical Playground	C-123; T-123	Coded by island of issuance	
	1953	Green on yellow	Tropical Playground	C-123; T-1234	Coded by island of issuance	
	1954	Green on white	Tropical Playground	C-1234; T-1234	Coded by island of issuance	
	1955	Red on white	Tropical Playground	C-1234; T-1234	Coded by island of issuance	
	1956	Blue on white	Tropical Playground	C-1234; T-1234	Coded by island of issuance	
	1957	Blue on yellow	Tropical Playground	C-1234; T-1234	Coded by island of issuance	
	1958	Green on white	Tropical Playground	C-1234; T-1234	Coded by island of issuance	
	1959	Red on white	Tropical Playground	C-1234; T-1234	Coded by island of issuance	
	1960	White on blue	Tropical Playground	C-1234; T-1234	Coded by island of issuance	
	1961	Brown on orange	Tropical Playground	C-1234; T-1234	Coded by island of issuance	
	1962	Off-white on green	Tropical Playground	C-1234; T-1234	Coded by island of issuance	
	1963	White on blue	Vacation Adventure	C-1234; T-1234	Coded by island of issuance	
	1964	White on red	Vacation Adventure	C-1234; T-1234	Coded by island of issuance	
	1965	Green on yellow	Vacation Adventure	C-1234; T-1234	Coded by island of issuance	
	1966	White on black	Vacation Adventure	C-1234; T-1234	Coded by island of issuance	
	1967	White on blue	Vacation Adventure	C-1234; T-1234	Coded by island of issuance	

=== 1968 to present ===
Image	Dates issued	Design	Slogan	Serial format	Serials issued	Notes
	1968	White on black	American Paradise	C-12345; T-12345	Coded by island of issuance	Revalidated for 1969 and 1970 with plate stickers.
	1969–70	As above, but without "68"	American Paradise	C-12345; T-12345	Coded by island of issuance	Revalidated for 1969 and 1970 with plate stickers.
	1971–74	White on dark blue	American Paradise	C-12345; T-12345	Coded by island of issuance	Revalidated for 1972, 1973 and 1974 with plate stickers.
	1975–77	White on lime green	American Paradise	C-12345; T-12345; J-123	Coded by island of issuance	'J' code introduced for St. John. Revalidated for 1976 and 1977 with windshield stickers; plates continue to be revalidated in this manner today.
	1978–80	Blue on reflective white	American Paradise	C-12345; T-12345; J-123	Coded by island of issuance	Monthly staggered registration introduced 1980.
	1981–87	Green on reflective white	American Paradise	C-12340; T-12340; J-1230	Coded by island of issuance and month of expiration	The last digit of the serial corresponded to the expiration month (1 for January, 2 for February and so on up to 0 for October). This practice continued until 2000.
	1988–93	Red on reflective white	American Paradise	C-12340; T-12340; J-1230	Coded by island of issuance and month of expiration	
	1994–99	Red on reflective white with background image of islands	American Paradise	C-12340; T-12340; J-1230	Coded by island of issuance and month of expiration	Some of these plates had a light blue background.
	2000–05	Black on reflective yellow with background image of islands	Our Islands, Our Home	CAB-123	CAA-001 to CCD-999	
	2000–05	Black on reflective yellow with background image of islands	Our Islands, Our Home	TAB-123	TAA-001 to TCE-999	
	2000–05	Black on reflective yellow with background image of islands	Our Islands, Our Home	JAB-123	JAA-001 to JAG-500	
	2006 – April 10, 2016	Black on beach scene graphic	America's Caribbean	CAB 123	CCE 001 to CET 999	
	2006 – April 10, 2016	Black on beach scene graphic	America's Caribbean	TAB 123	TCF 001 to TEX 999	
	2006 – April 10, 2016	Black on beach scene graphic	America's Caribbean	JAB 123	JAG 501 to JAO 999	
	April 11, 2016 – February 28, 2023	White on blue ocean background with orange island maps	Transfer Centennial	CAB 123	CEY 001 to CGY 999	Commemorates the 100th anniversary of the transfer of the islands from Denmark to the United States.
	April 11, 2016 – February 28, 2023	White on blue ocean background with orange island maps	Transfer Centennial	TAB 123	TEY 001 to TGX 999	Commemorates the 100th anniversary of the transfer of the islands from Denmark to the United States.
	April 11, 2016 – February 28, 2023	White on blue ocean background with orange island maps	Transfer Centennial	JAB 123	JAQ 001 to JAX 999	Commemorates the 100th anniversary of the transfer of the islands from Denmark to the United States.
	March 1, 2023 – present	Black embossed with top strip teal, middle strip white, and low strip gold with 175th Emancipation logo in middle	175th Emancipation	CAB 123	CGZ 001 to present	Commemorates the 175th Emancipation
	March 1, 2023 – present	Black embossed with top strip teal, middle strip white, and low strip gold with 175th Emancipation logo in middle	175th Emancipation	TAB 123	TGY 001 to present	Commemorates the 175th Emancipation
	March 1, 2023 – present	Black embossed with top strip teal, middle strip white, and low strip gold with 175th Emancipation logo in middle	175th Emancipation	JAB 123	JAY 001 to present	Commemorates the 175th Emancipation
