= American Empire =

American Empire most commonly refers to American imperialism, the expansionist policy, ideology, political, military, and cultural influence of the United States beyond its borders.

American Empire may also refer to:

- American Empire (film), a 1942 Western film
- American Empire (series), a series of novels by Harry Turtledove
- American Empire Project, a nonfiction book series
- American Empire style, a style of furniture and decoration
- American Empire, a fictional country in the Ghost in the Shell series

== See also ==
- Aerican Empire, a micronation name derived from American Empire
