= Vehicle registration plates of the British Virgin Islands =

British Overseas of the Virgin Islands
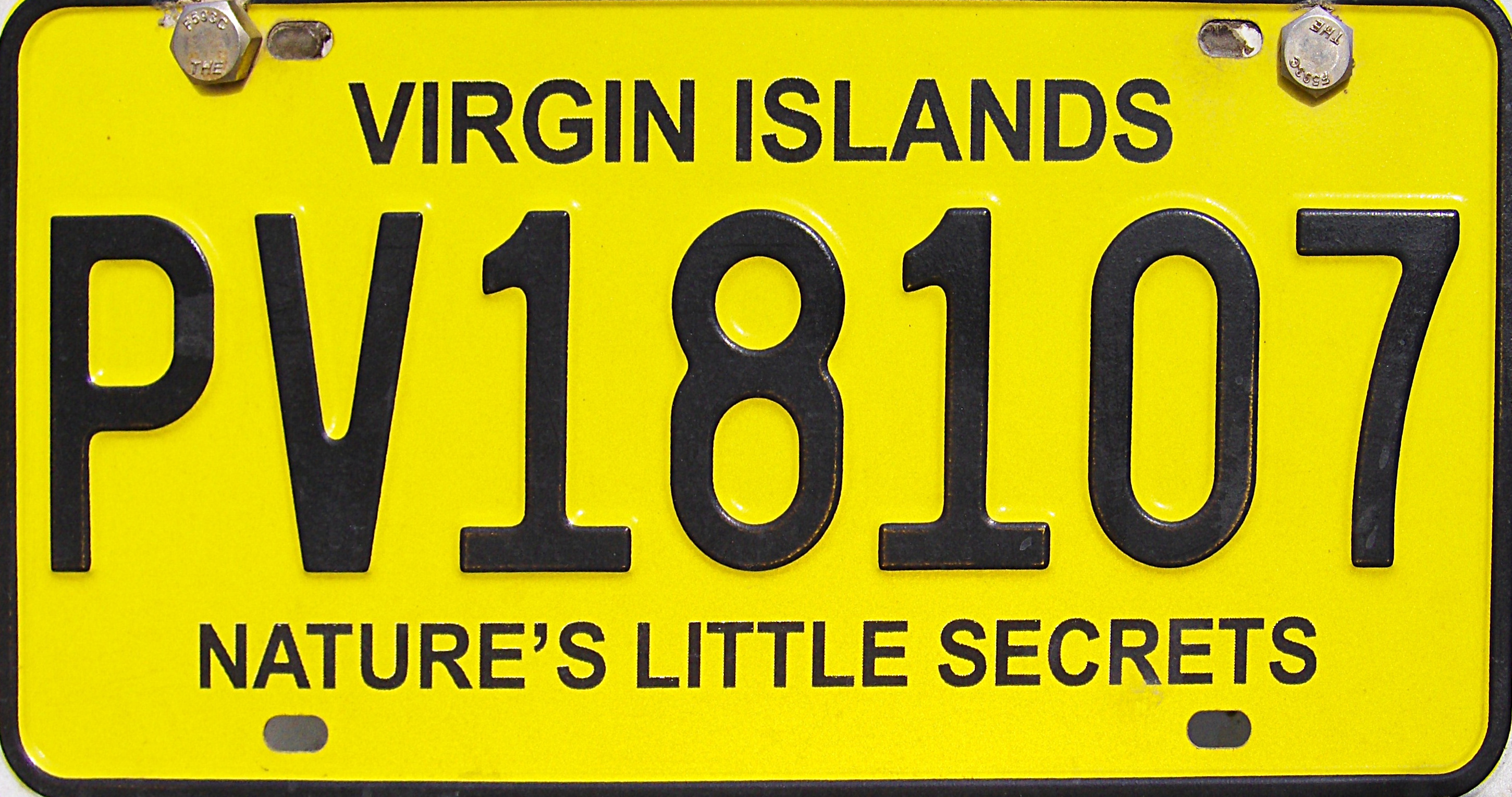
- Private vehicles have plates sequenced 'PV' followed by five digits.
- Country: British Virgin Islands
- Country code: BVI

Current series
- Slogan: Nature's Little Secrets
- Size: 300 mm × 152 mm 11.8 in × 6.0 in
- Colour (front): Black on yellow
- Colour (rear): Black on yellow

The British Virgin Islands requires its residents to register their motor vehicles and display vehicle registration plates. Many plates have 'Virgin Islands' and 'Nature's Little Secrets' above and below the sequence respectively. Before 1996, European standard 520 mm × 110 mm (20.5 in × 4.3 in) sizes and British stamping dies were used, but current plates are North American standard 12 in × 6 in (300 mm × 152 mm) as used in the US Virgin Islands.

Image	First issued	Design	Slogan	Serial format	Serials issued	Notes
12345		Black on yellow		12345		Prior to 1995 only numerals were used.
VI 1234	1995	Black on yellow		VI 1234		'VI' was used as the prefix for one year in 1995–1996.
		White on red	Nature's Little Secrets	GV 1234		Government vehicles
		Black on white	Nature's Little Secrets	CM 1234		Commercial vehicles
RT 1234		Black on green		RT 1234		Rental vehicles
		Black on white	Nature's Little Secrets	TAXI 123 or TX 1234		Taxis
		Black on yellow	Nature's Little Secrets	PV12345		Private vehicles

== See also ==
- Vehicle registration plates of British overseas territories
