= American Empire style =

American furniture style

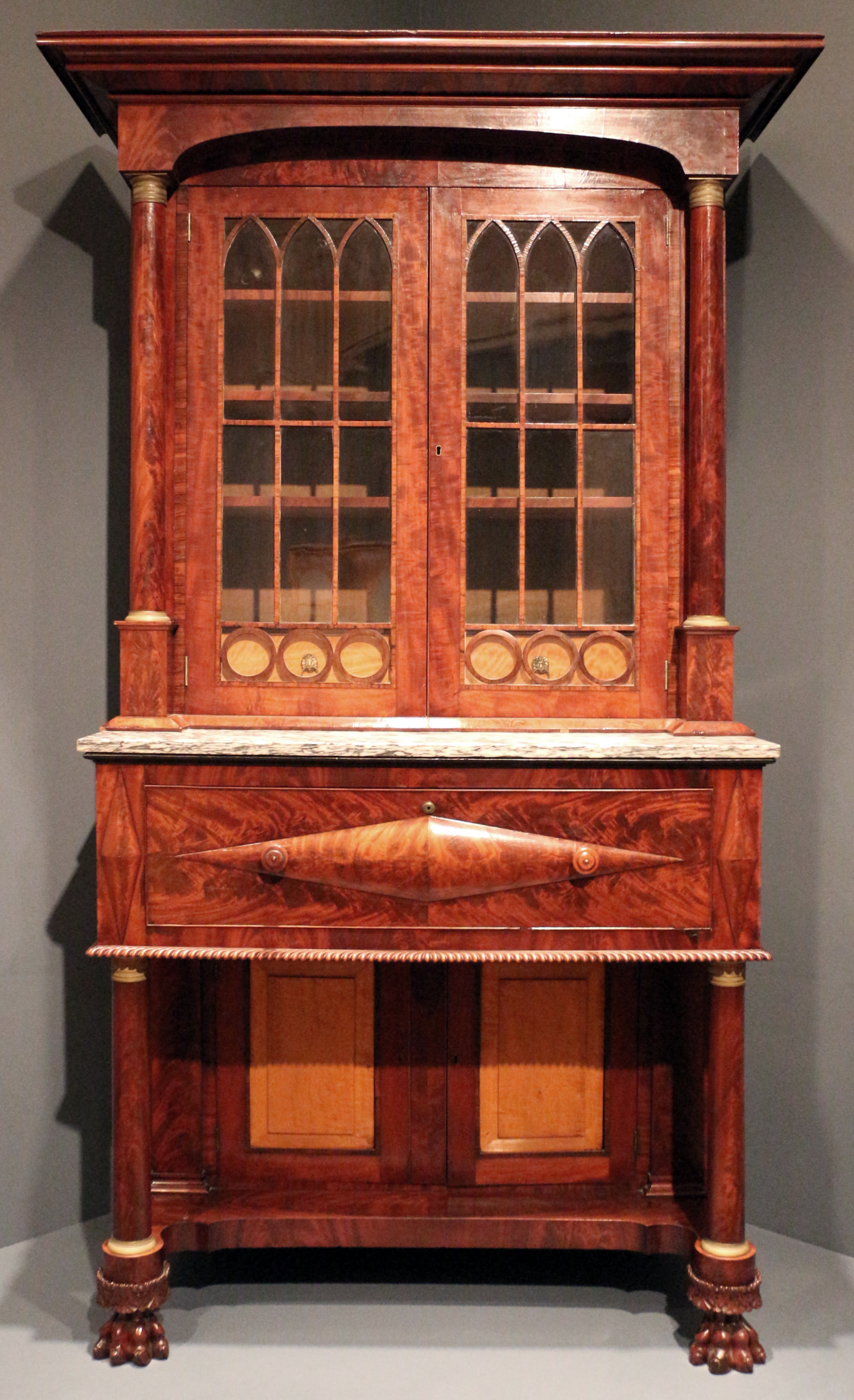
Bookcase, c. 1830-40, probably from New York, maker unknown. Rosewood, mahogany, Bird's eye maple veneer, marble, ormolu, and leather. In the collection of the Cincinnati Art Museum

American Empire is a French-inspired Neoclassical style of American furniture and decoration that takes its name and originates from the Empire style introduced during the First French Empire period under Napoleon's rule. It gained its greatest popularity in the U.S. after 1820 and is considered the second, more robust phase of the Neoclassical style, which earlier had been expressed in the Adam style in Britain and Louis Seize, or Louis XVI, in France. As an early-19th-century design movement in the United States, it encompassed architecture, furniture and other decorative arts, as well as the visual arts.

In American furniture, the Empire style was most notably exemplified by the work of New York cabinetmakers Duncan Phyfe and Paris-trained Charles-Honoré Lannuier. Other major furniture centers renowned for regional interpretations of the American Empire style were Boston, Philadelphia, and Baltimore. Many examples of American Empire cabinetmaking are characterized by antiquities-inspired carving, gilt-brass furniture mounts, and decorative inlays such as stamped-brass banding with egg-and-dart, diamond, or Greek-key patterns, or individual shapes such as stars or circles.

The most elaborate furniture in this style was made around 1815-25, often incorporating columns with rope-twist carving, animal-paw feet, anthemion, stars, and acanthus-leaf ornamentation, sometimes in combination with gilding and vert antique (antique green, simulating aged bronze). The Red Room at the White House is a fine example of American Empire style. A simplified version of American Empire furniture, often referred to as the Grecian style, generally displayed plainer surfaces in curved forms, highly figured mahogany veneers, and sometimes gilt-stencilled decorations. Many examples of this style survive, exemplified by massive chests of drawers with scroll pillars and glass pulls, work tables with scroll feet and fiddleback chairs. Elements of the style enjoyed a brief revival in the 1890s with, particularly, chests of drawers and vanities or dressing tables, usually executed in oak and oak veneers.

This Americanized interpretation of the Empire style continued in popularity in conservative regions outside the major metropolitan centers well past the mid-nineteenth century.

== Gallery ==
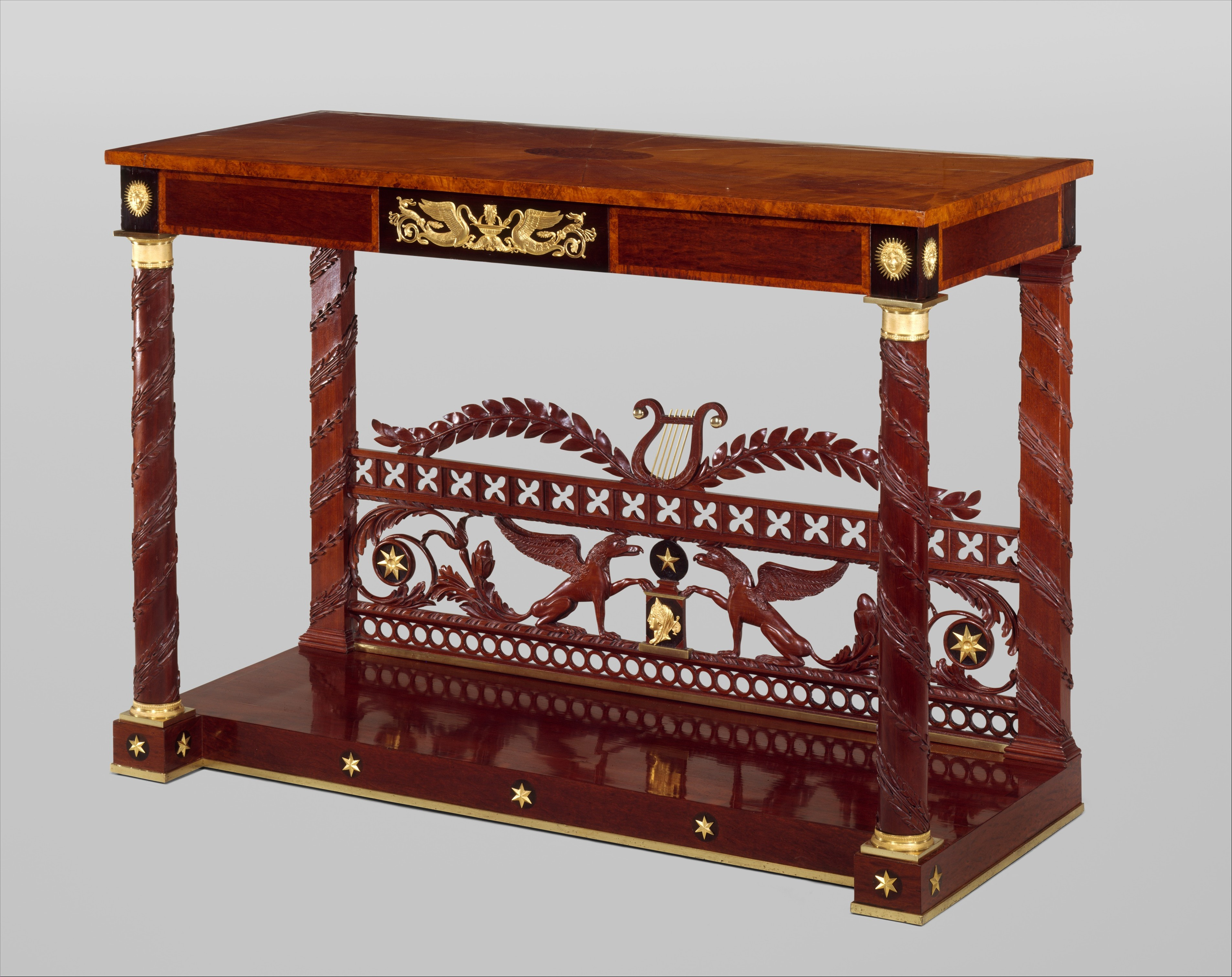
Pier table, Joseph B. Barry and Son, Made in Philadelphia, Pennsylvania, 1810–15

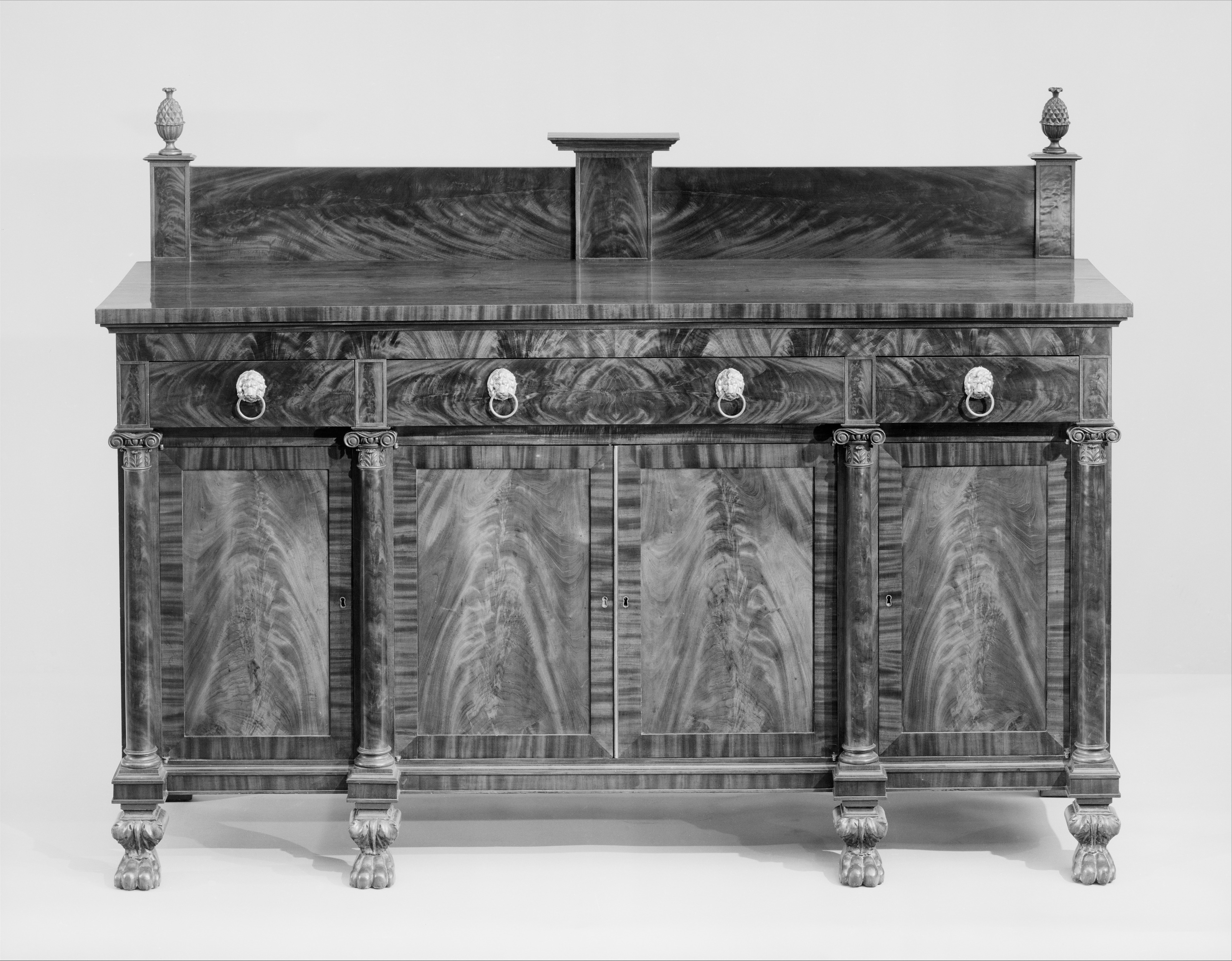
Sideboard Table, Charles-Honoré Lannuier, Made in New York, New York, 1812–19

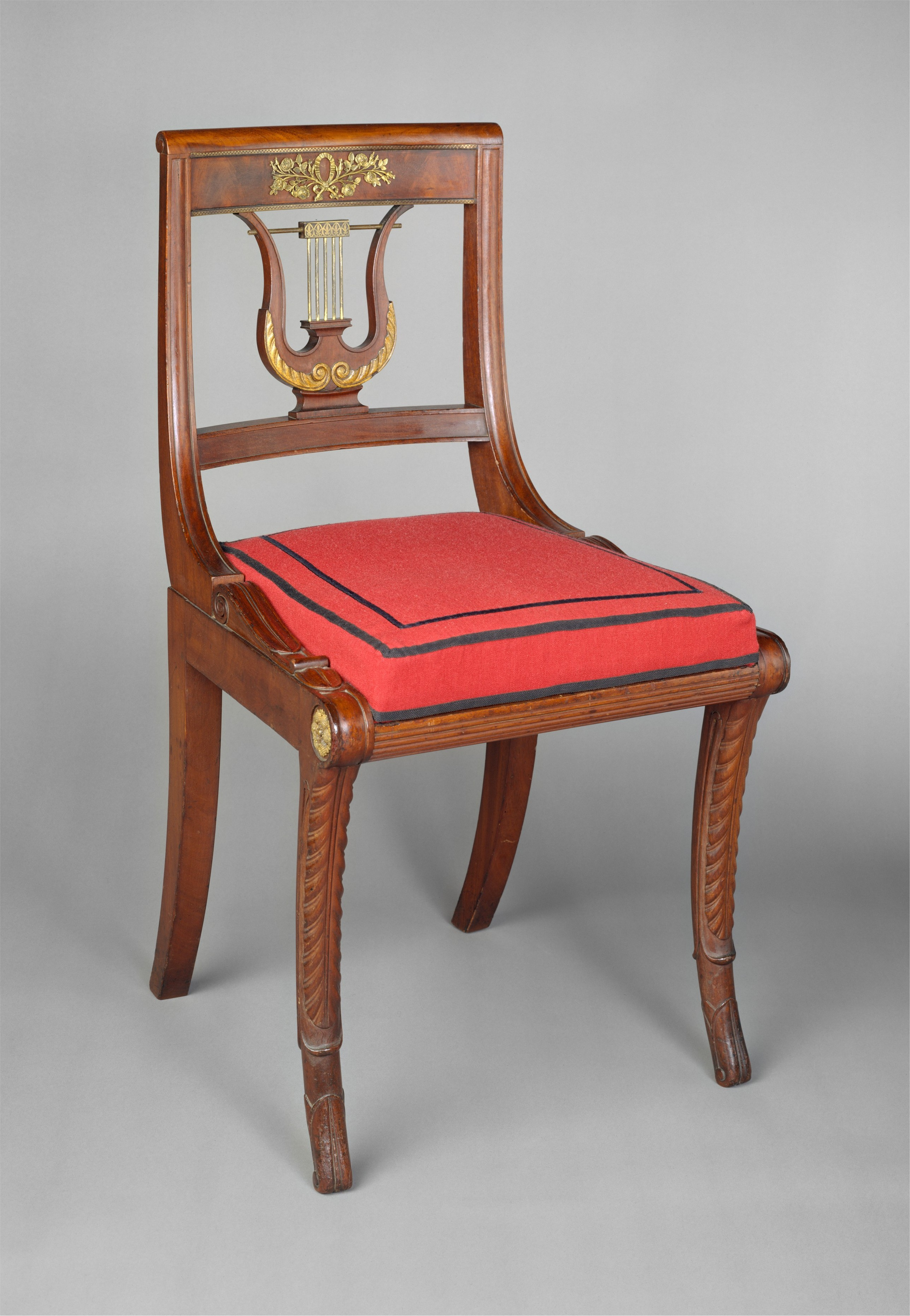
Side chair, Attributed to Charles-Honoré Lannuier, Made in New York, New York, 1815–19

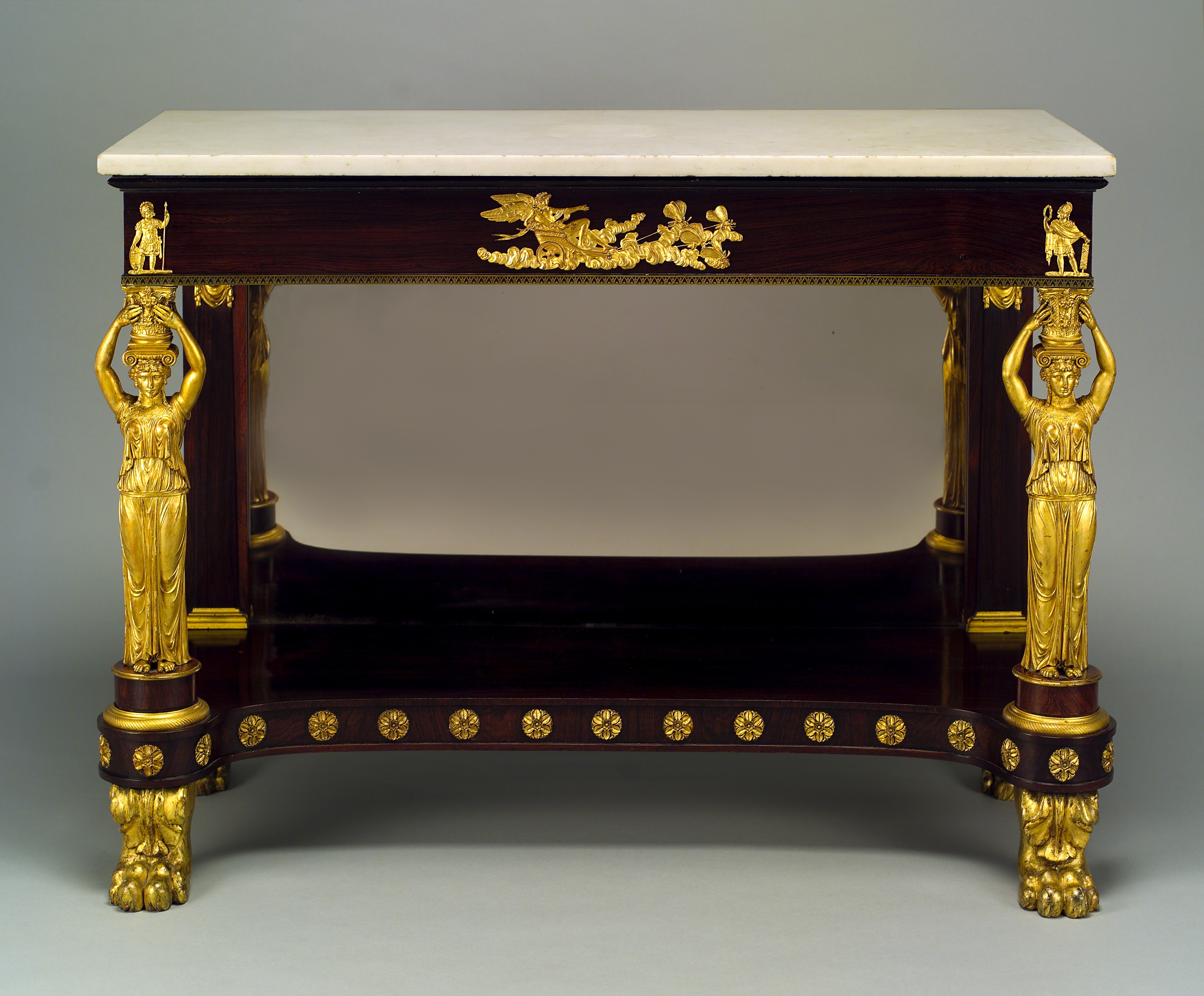
Pier table, Charles-Honoré Lannuier, Made in New York, New York, 1815–19

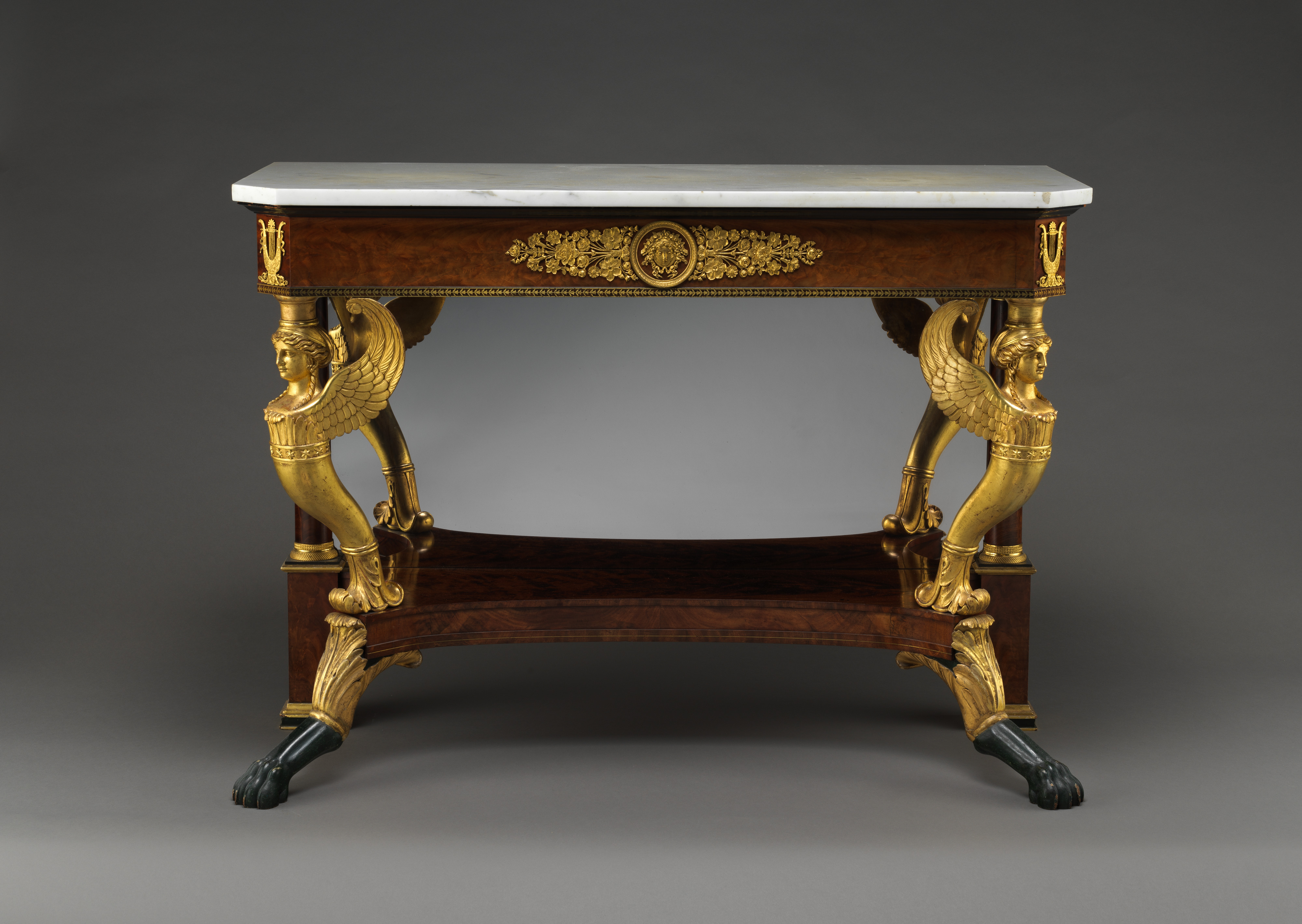
Pier Table, Charles-Honoré Lannuier, Made in New York, New York, 1815–19

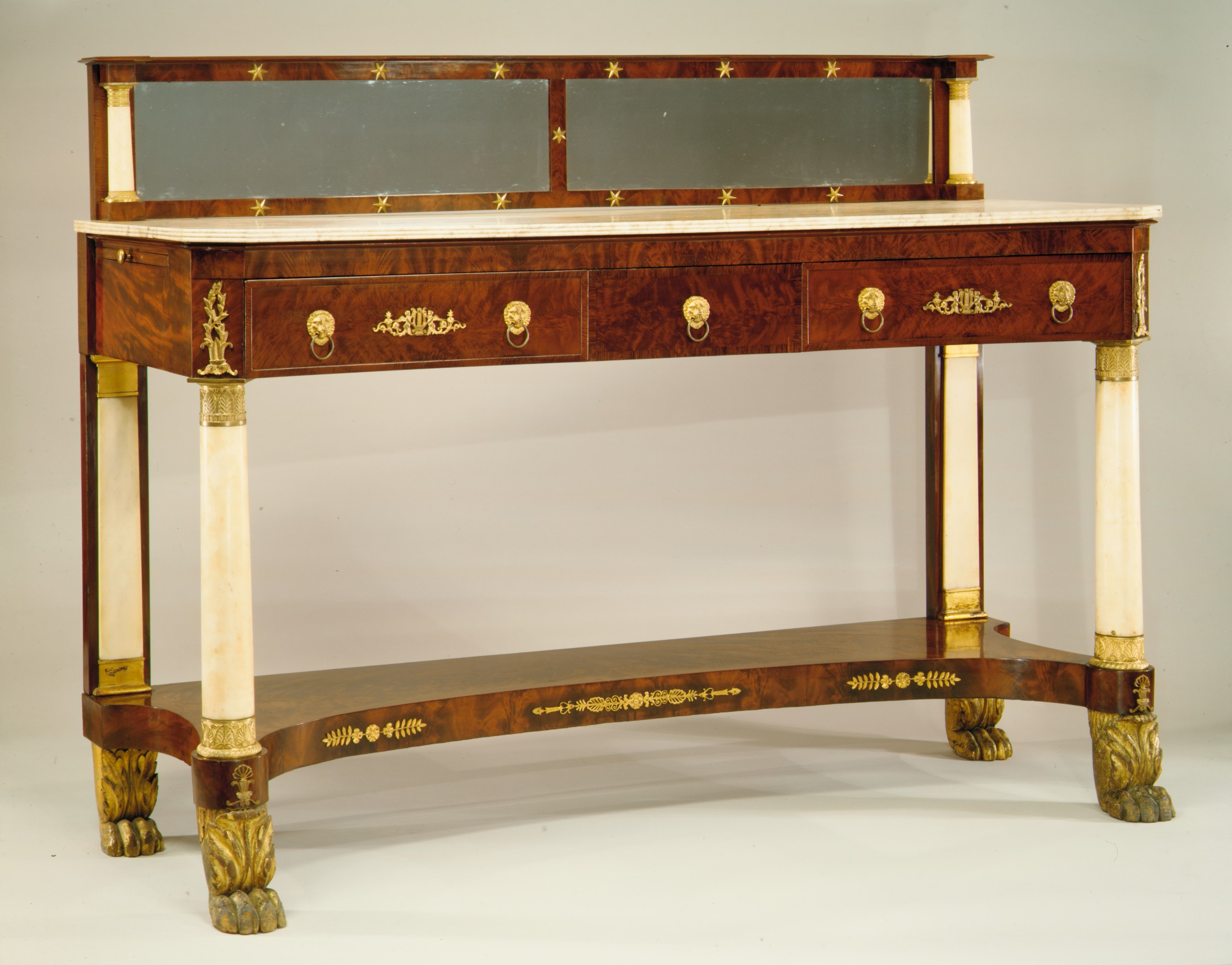
Sideboard Table, Made in New York, New York, 1815–20

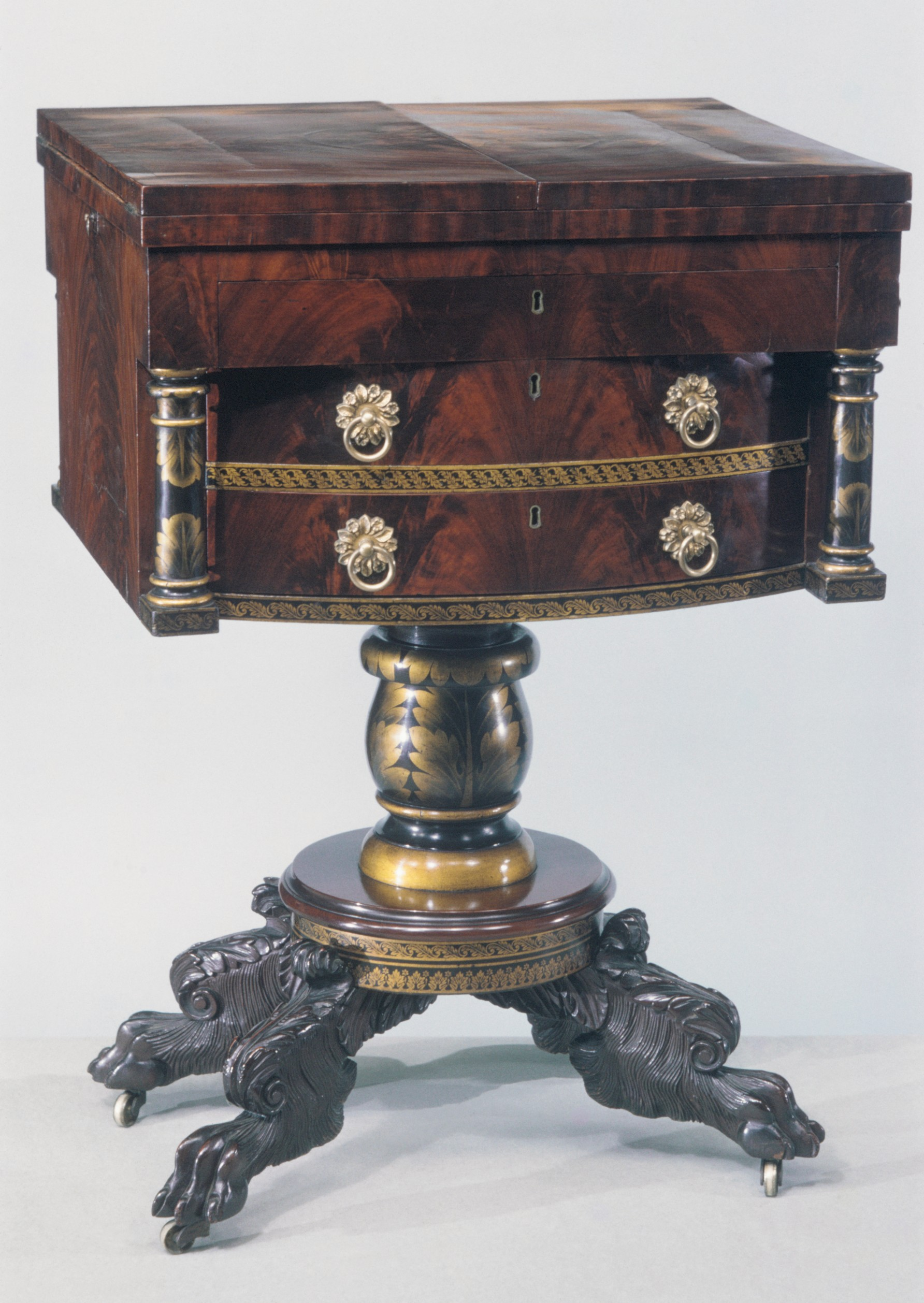
Work Table, Made in New York, New York, 1815–20

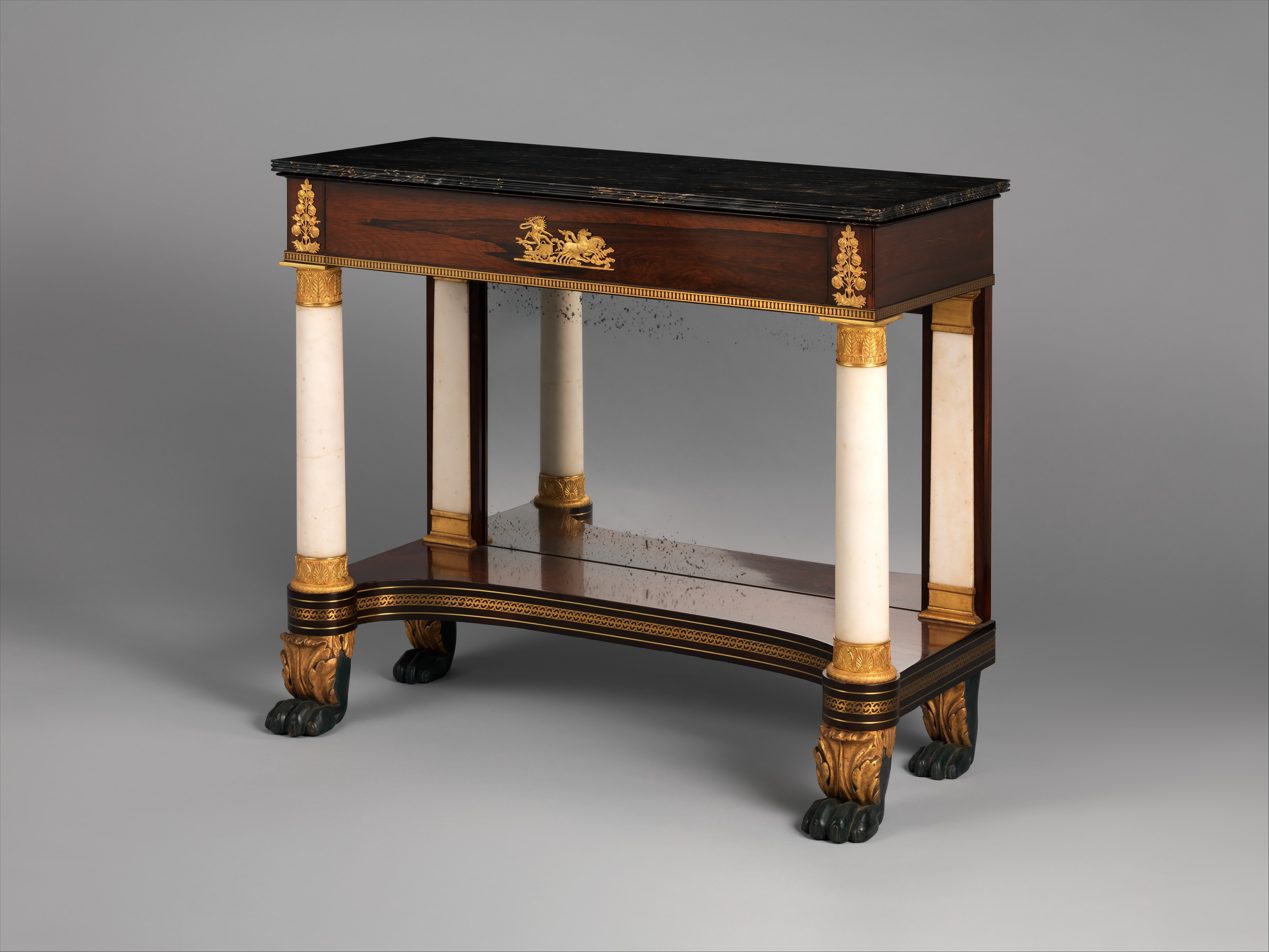
Pier Table, Attributed to Duncan Phyfe, Made in New York, New York, 1815–25

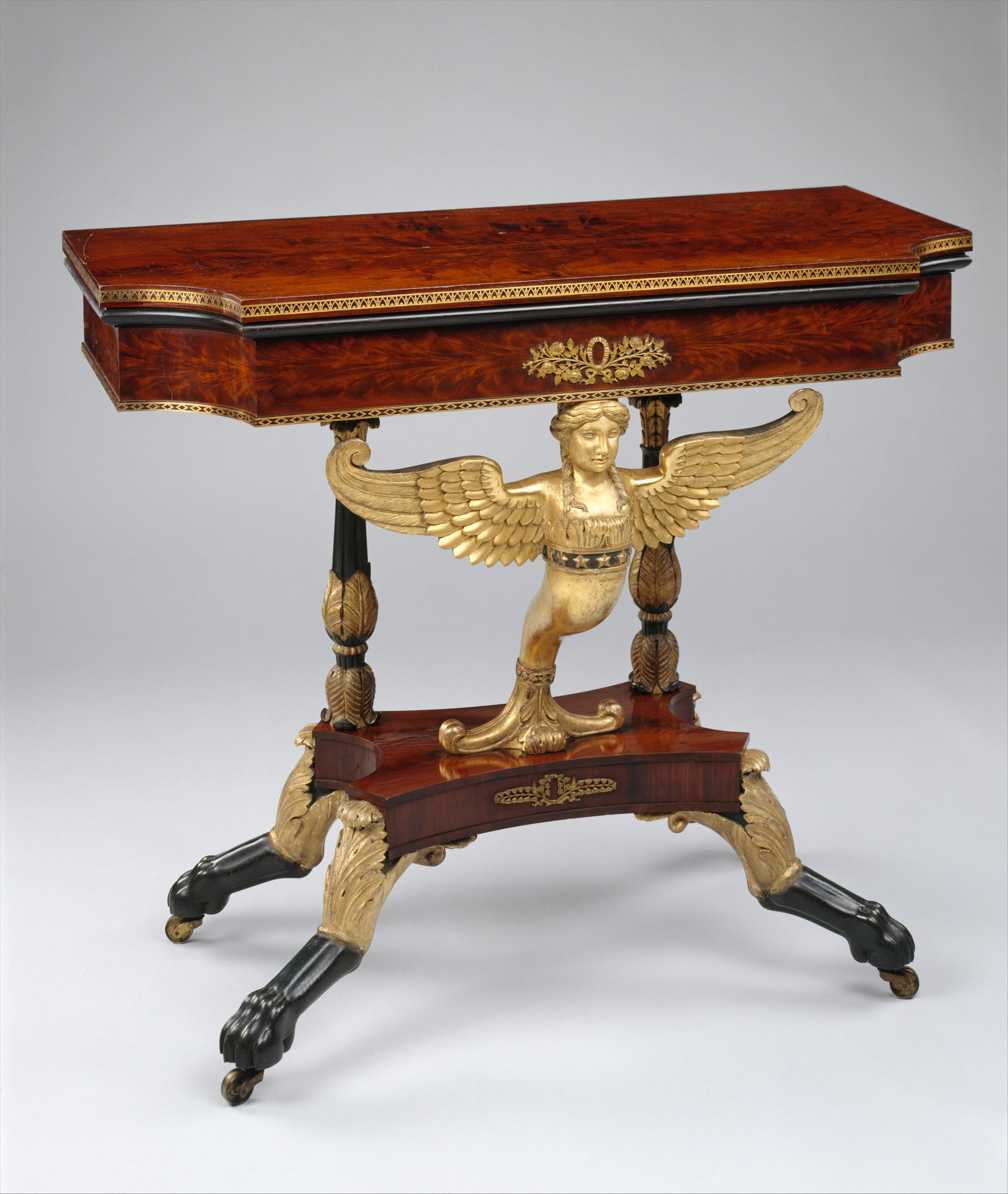
Card table, Charles-Honoré Lannuier, Made in New York, New York, 1817

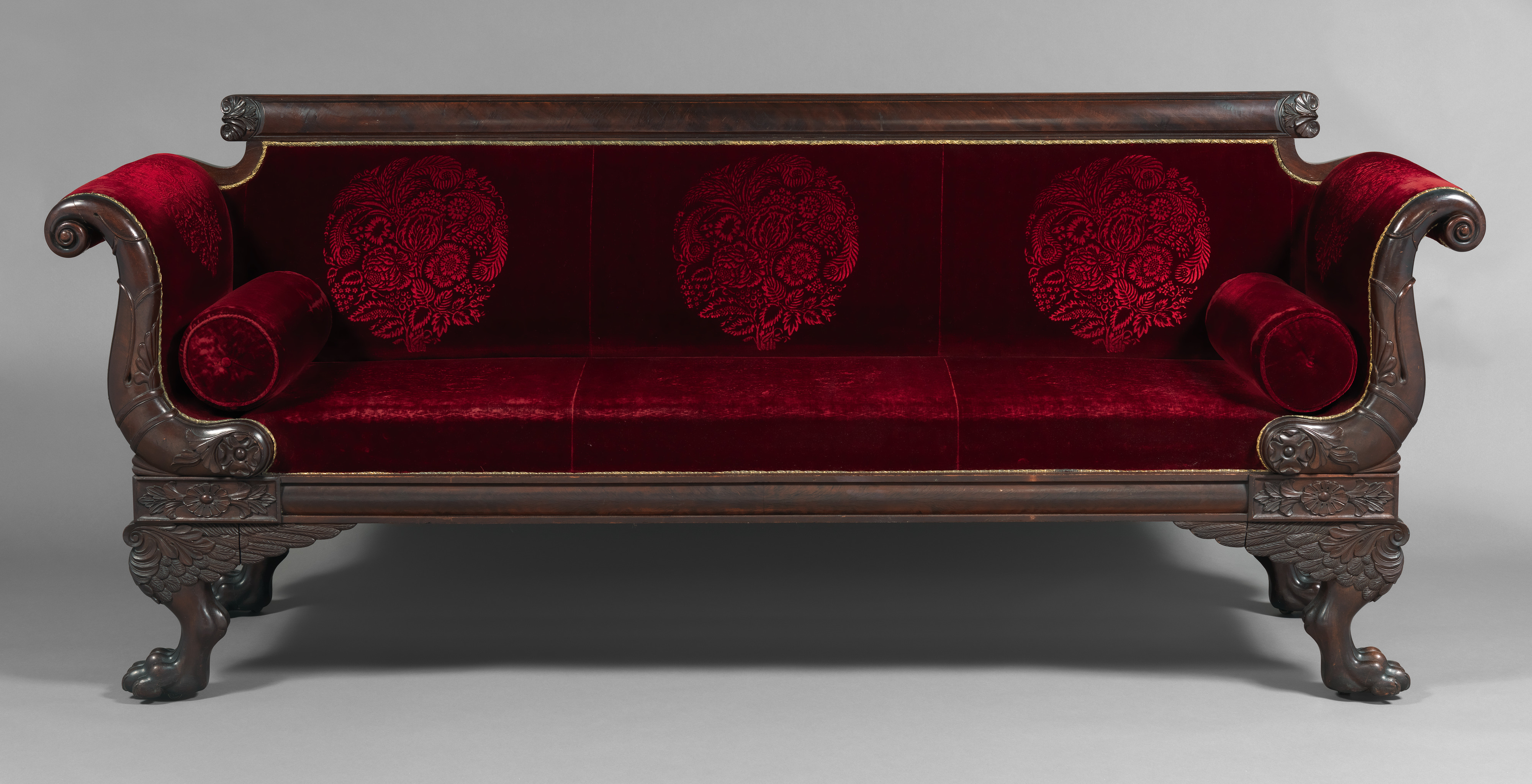
Sofa, Made in Boston, Massachusetts, circa 1820

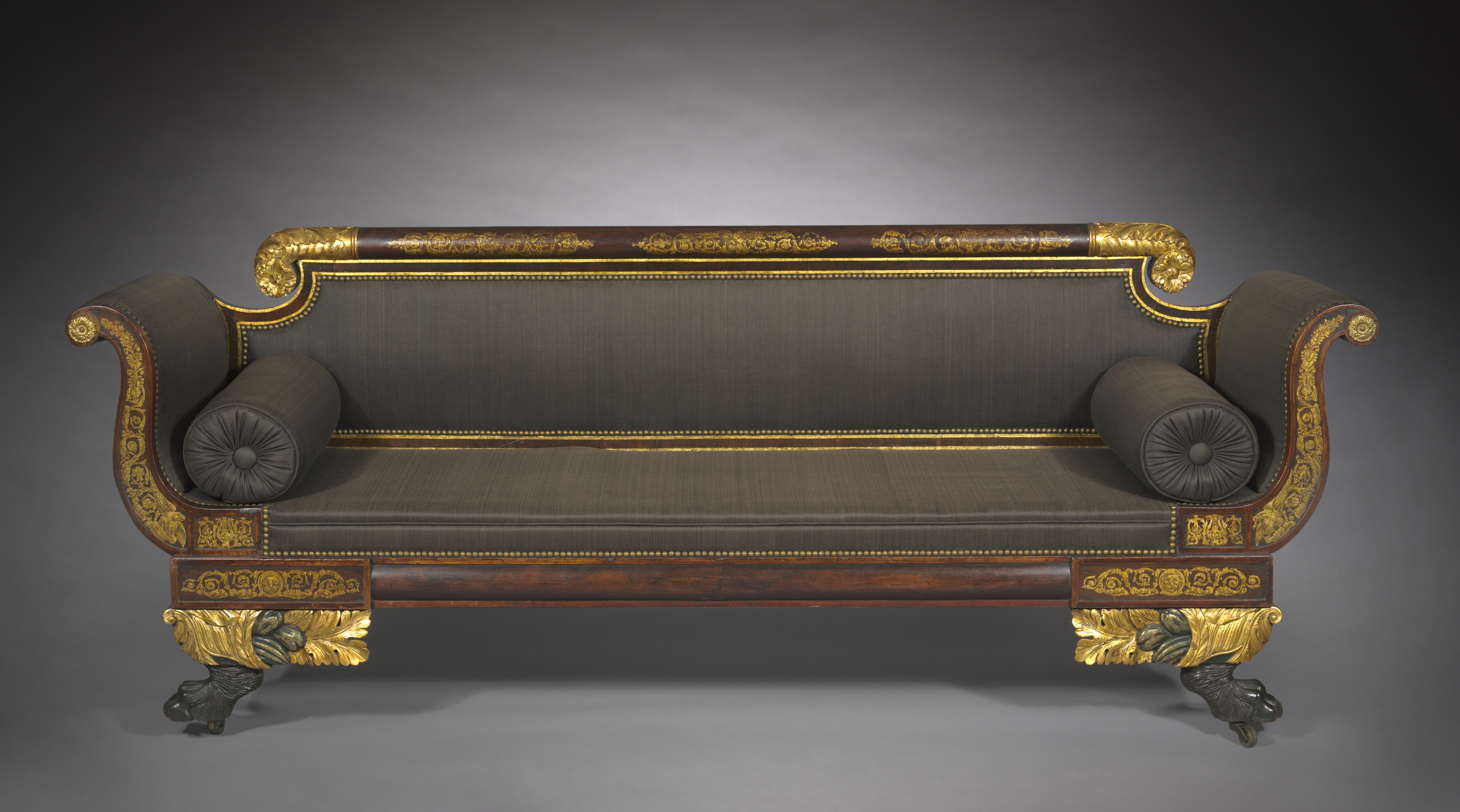
Sofa, Made in New York, New York, circa 1820

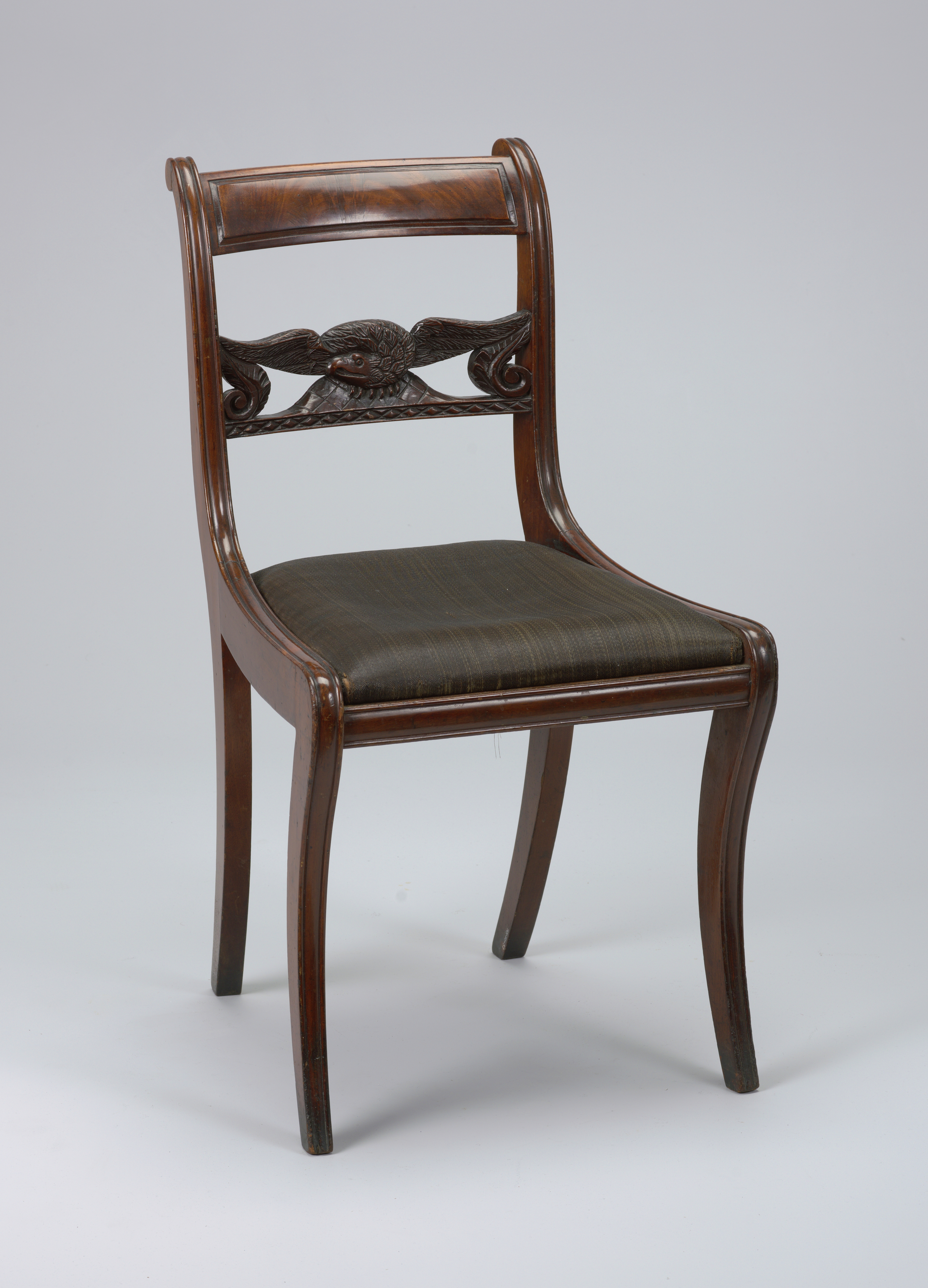
Side Chair, 1820–25

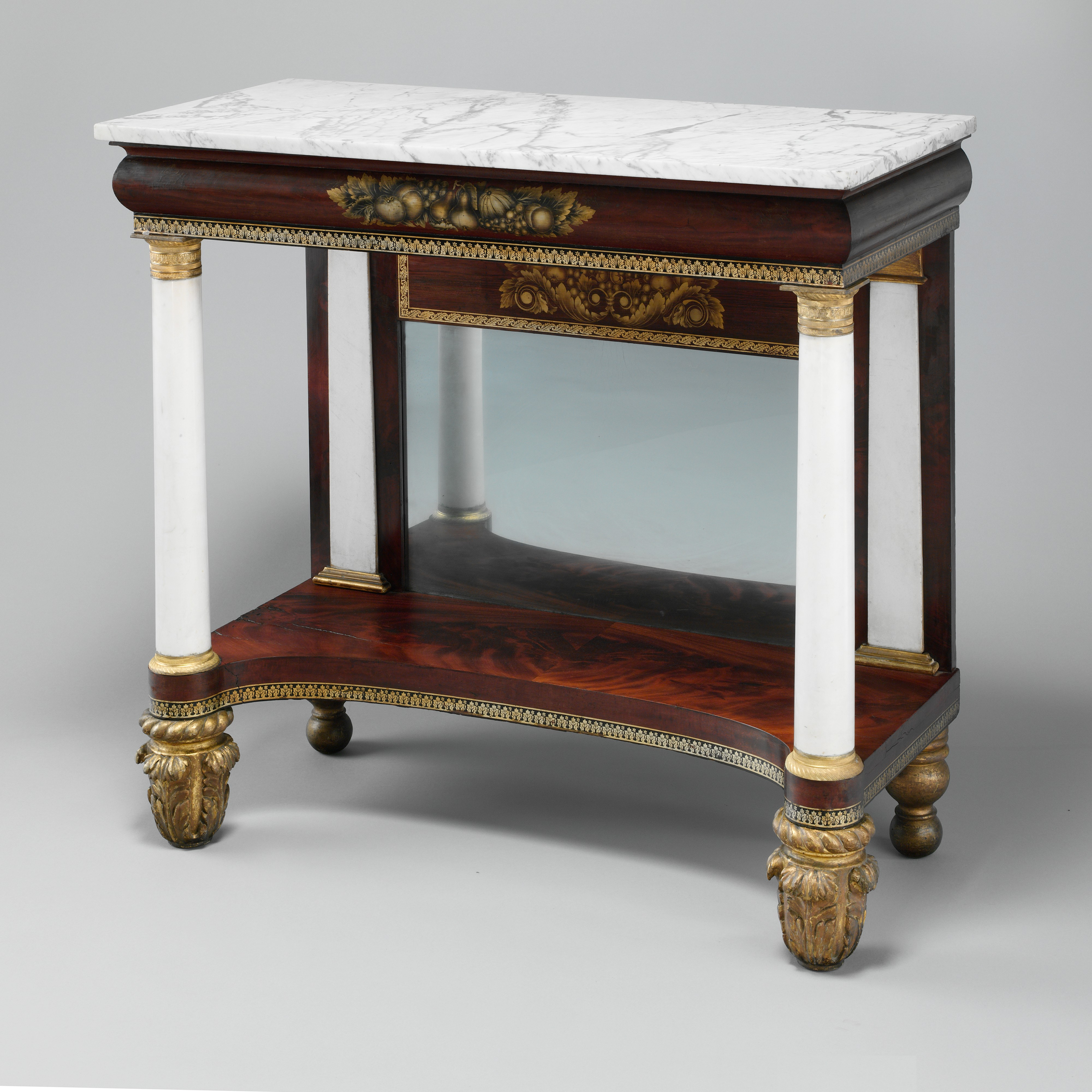
Pier Table, Holmes and Haines, Made in New York, New York, 1820–25

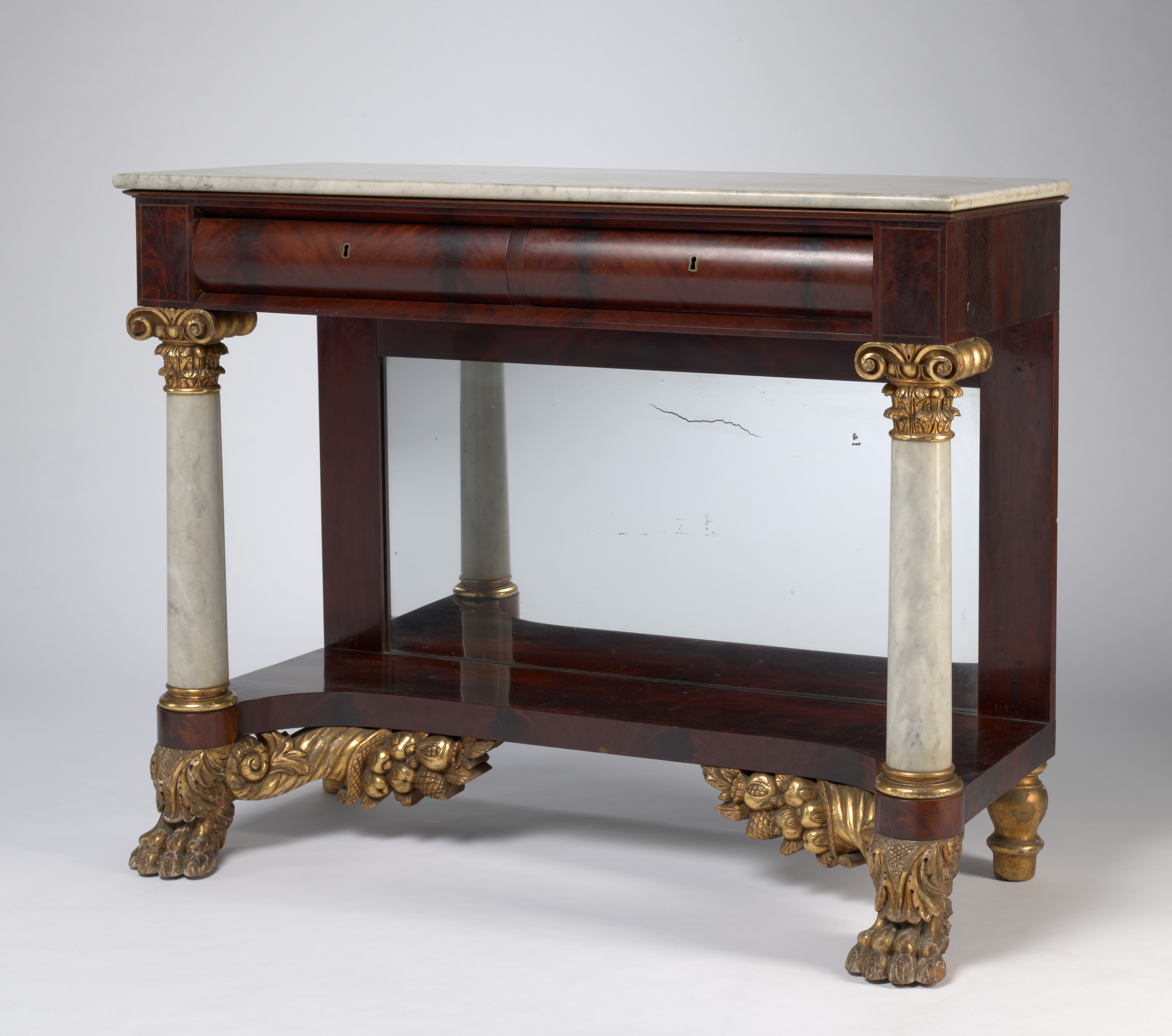
Console Table, 1820–30

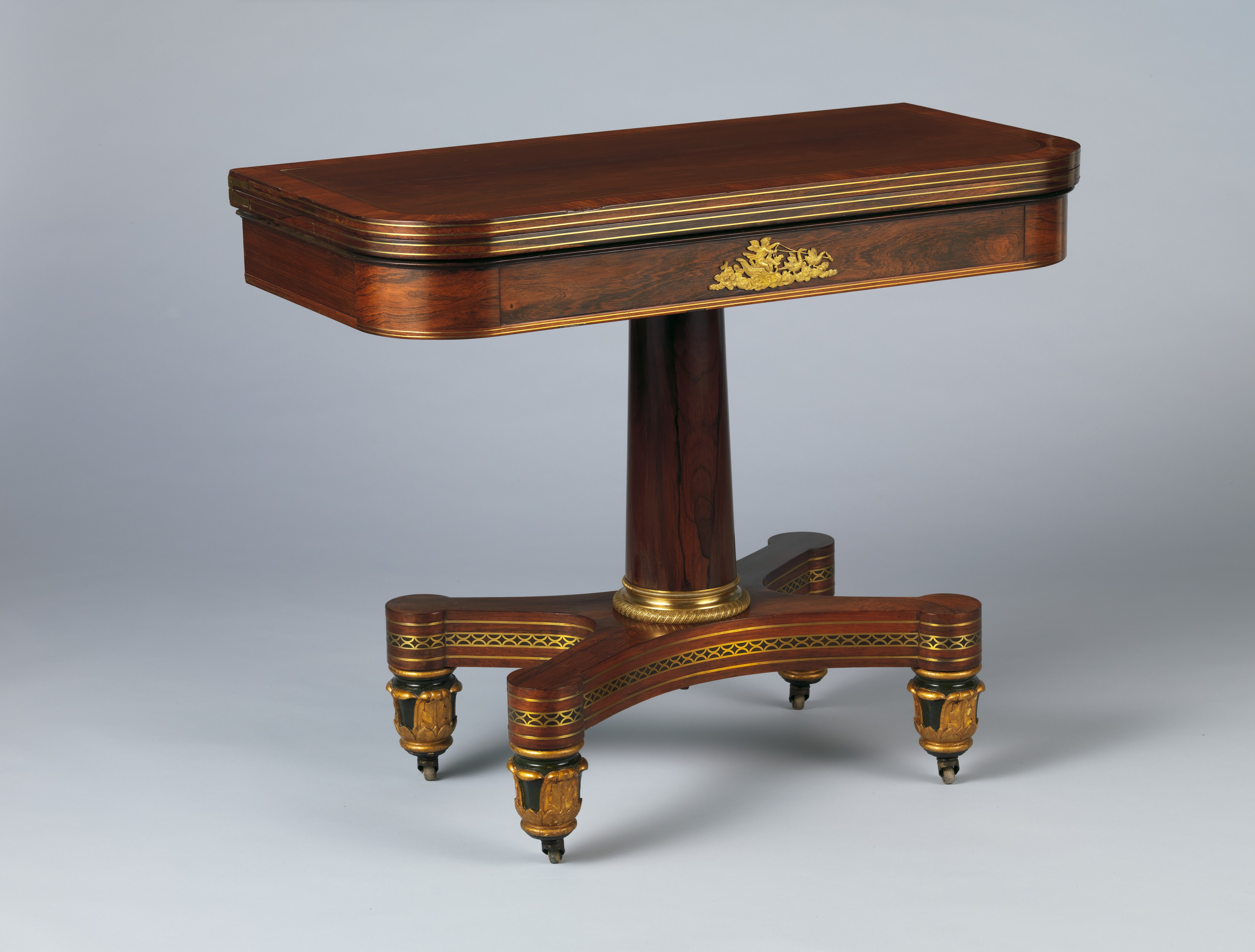
Card Table, Attributed to the Workshop of Duncan Phyfe, Made in New York, New York, circa 1825

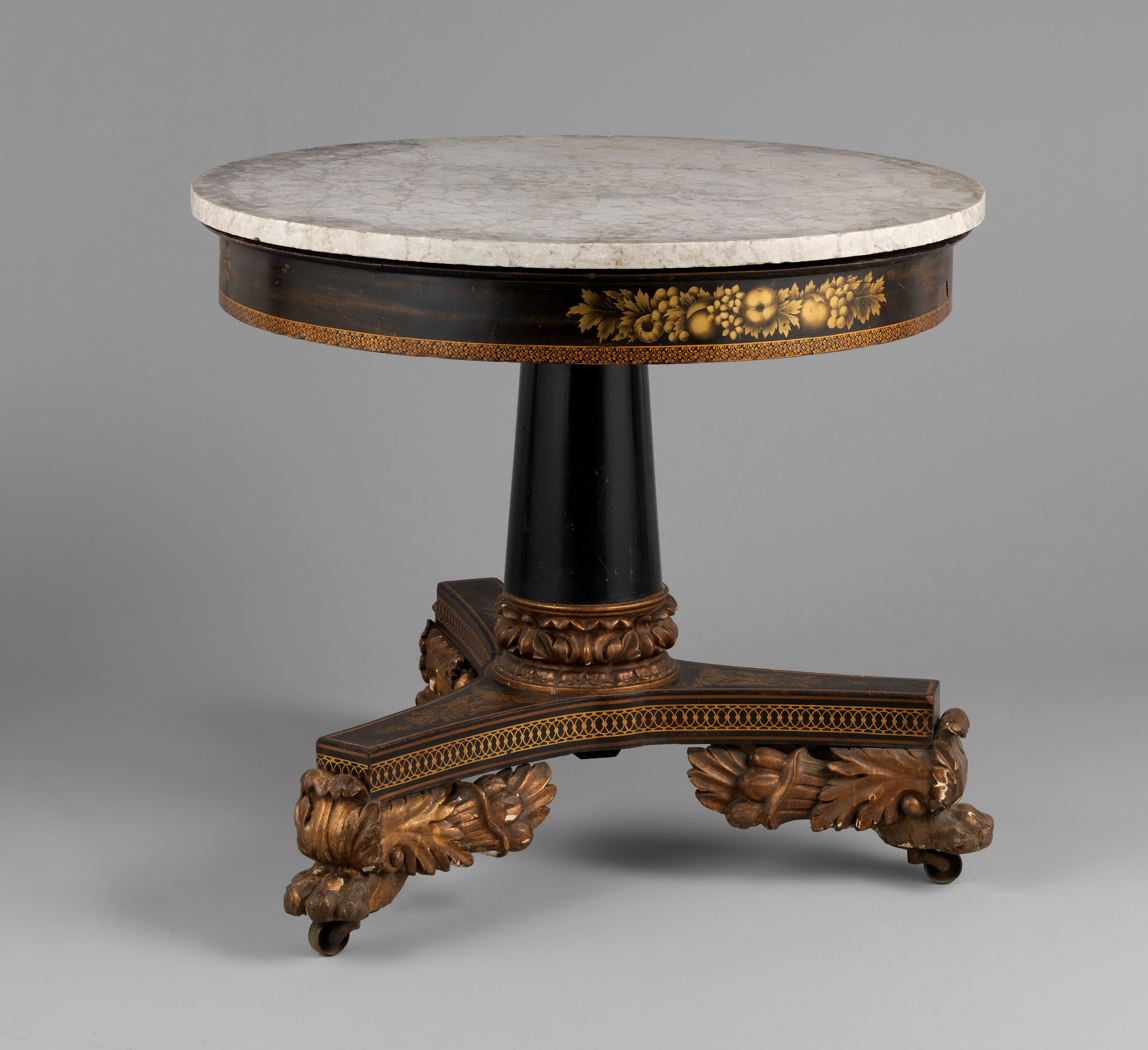
Center Table, Made in New York, New York, 1825–30

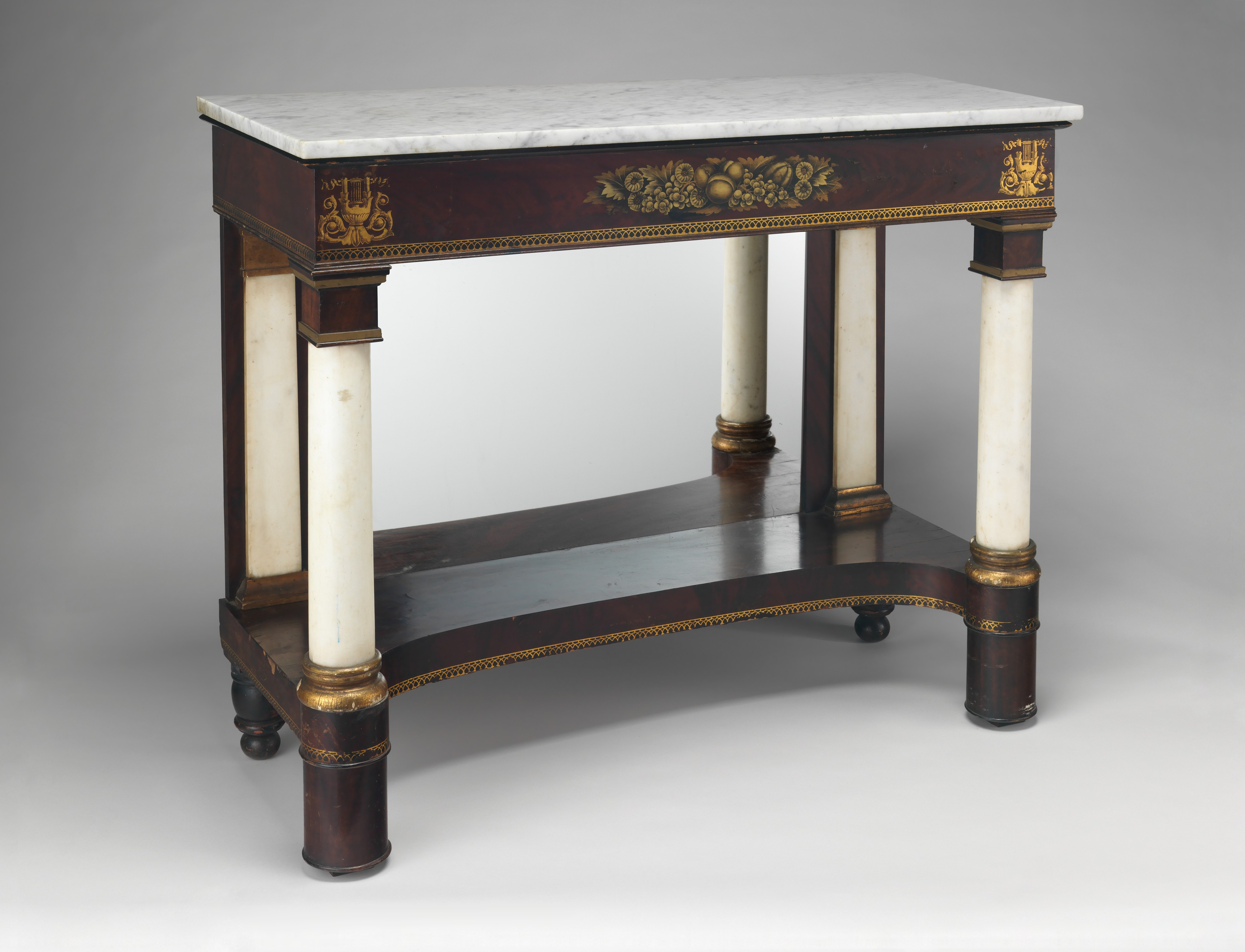
Pier table, Made in New York, New York, 1825–30

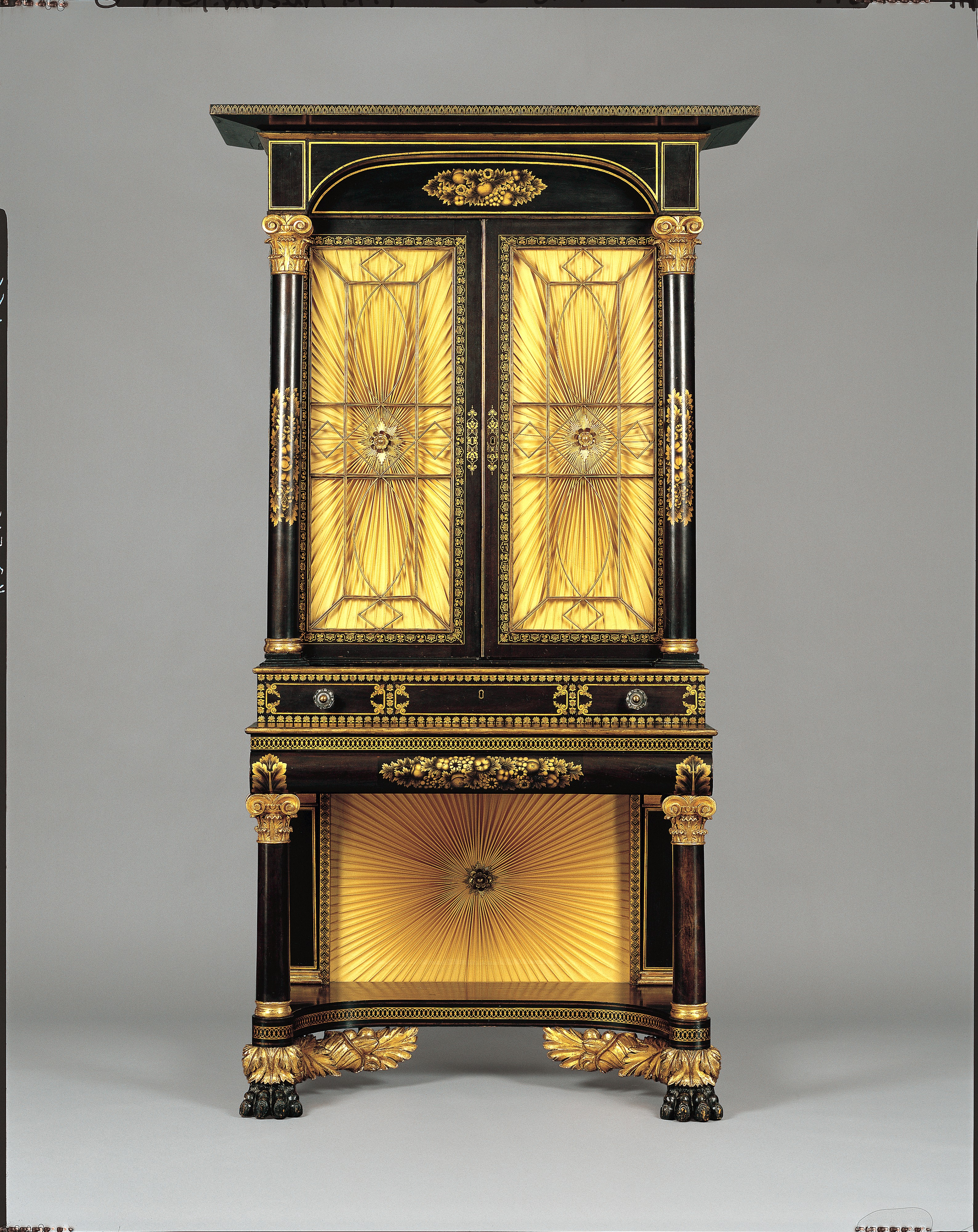
Secretary-bookcase, Possibly by Robert Fisher, Made in New York, New York, 1825–35

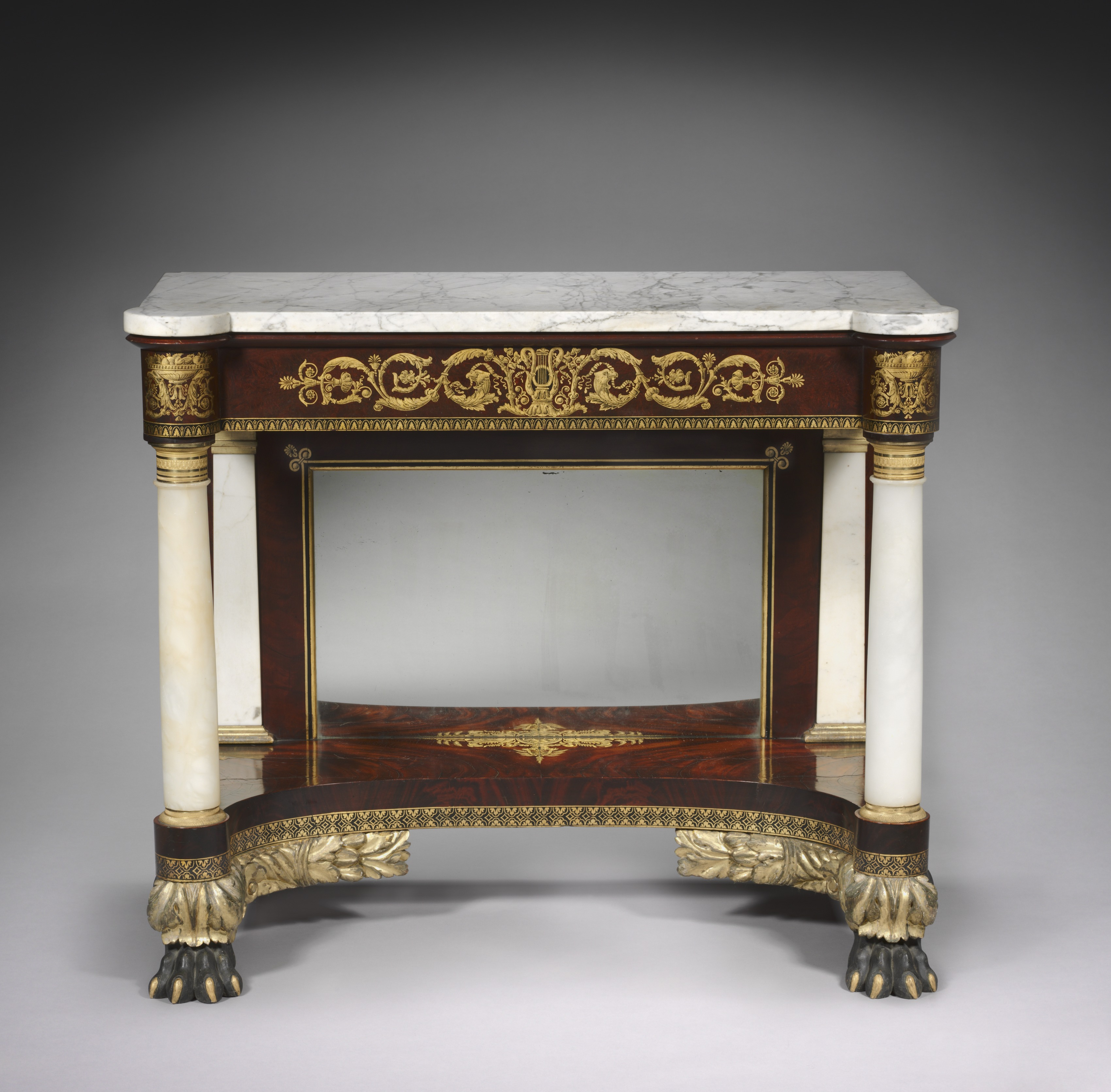
Pier Table, Joseph Meeks and Sons, Made in New York, New York, circa 1829–35

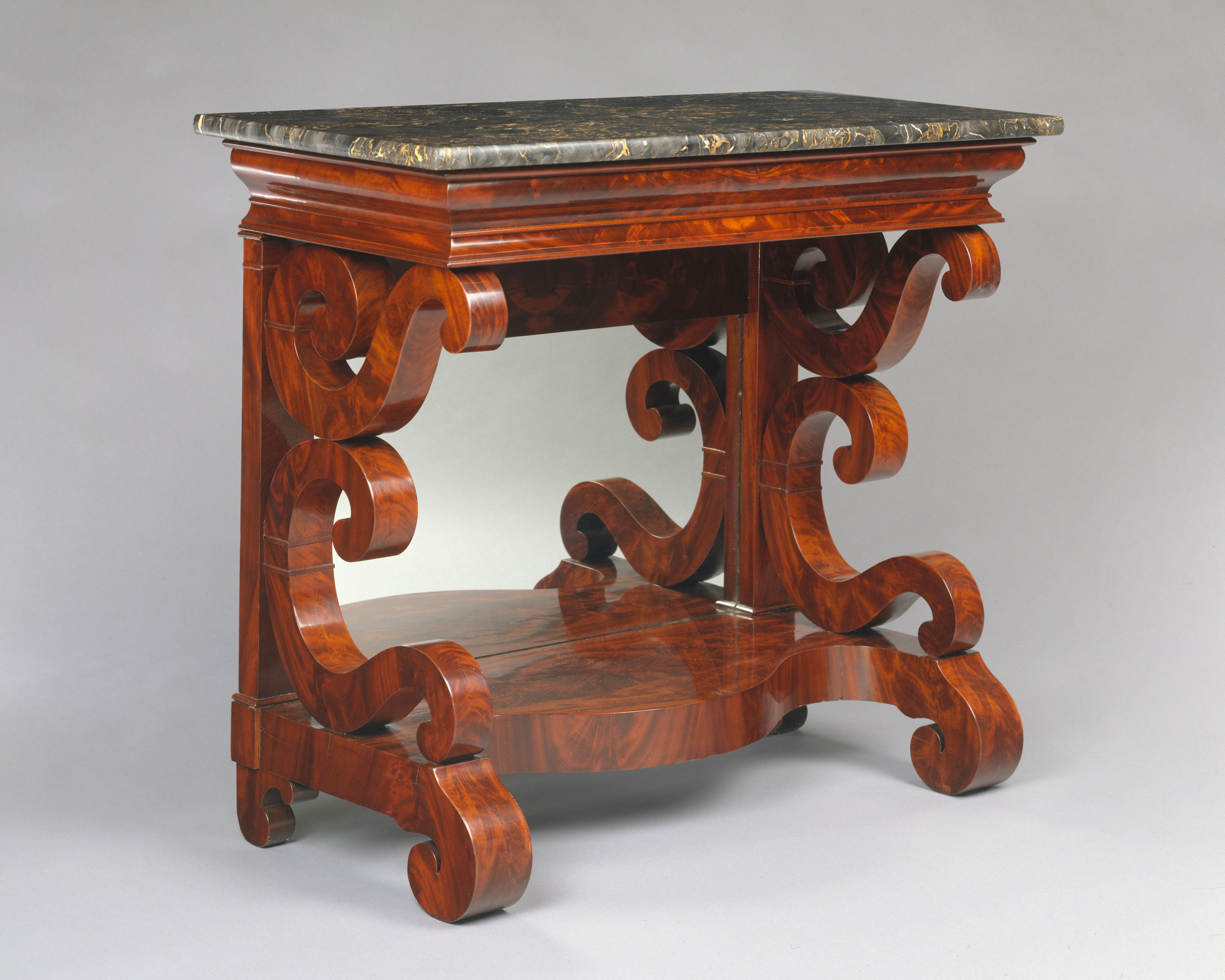
Pier Table, Joseph Meeks & Sons, Made in New York, New York, 1829–35

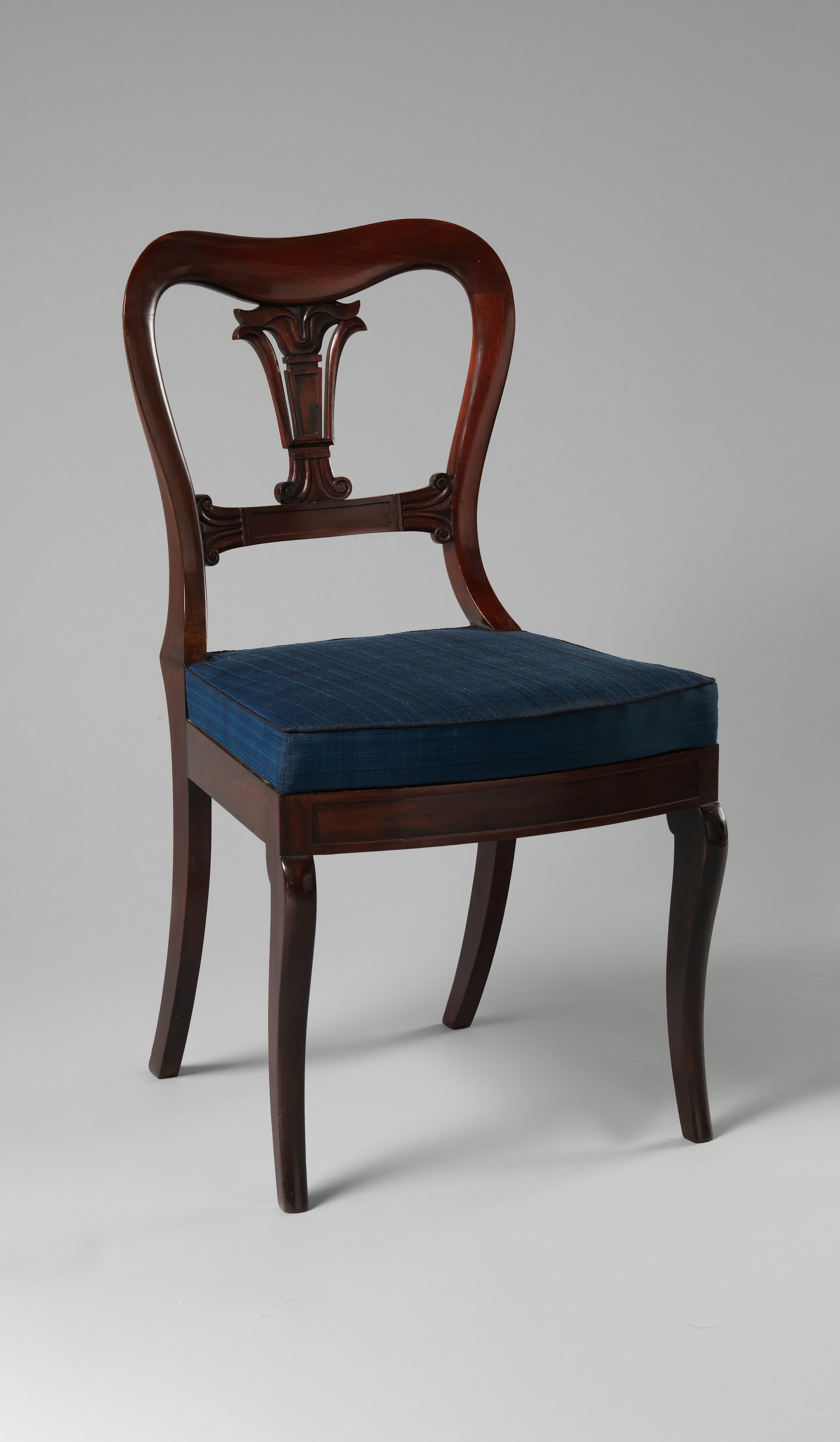
Side Chair, Possibly from the Workshop of Duncan Phyfe, Made in New York, New York, circa 1830

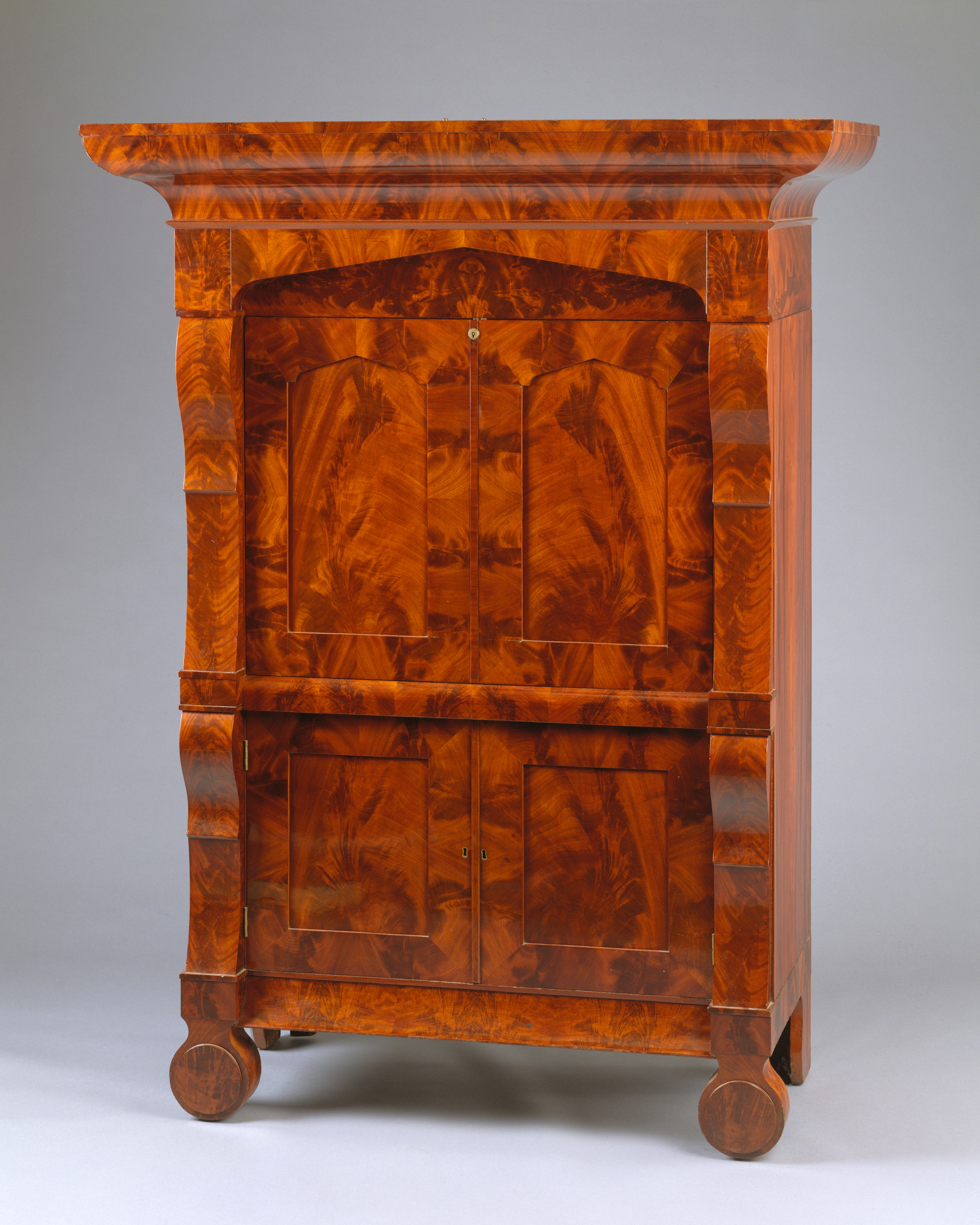
Fall-front Secretary, 1833–ca. 1841

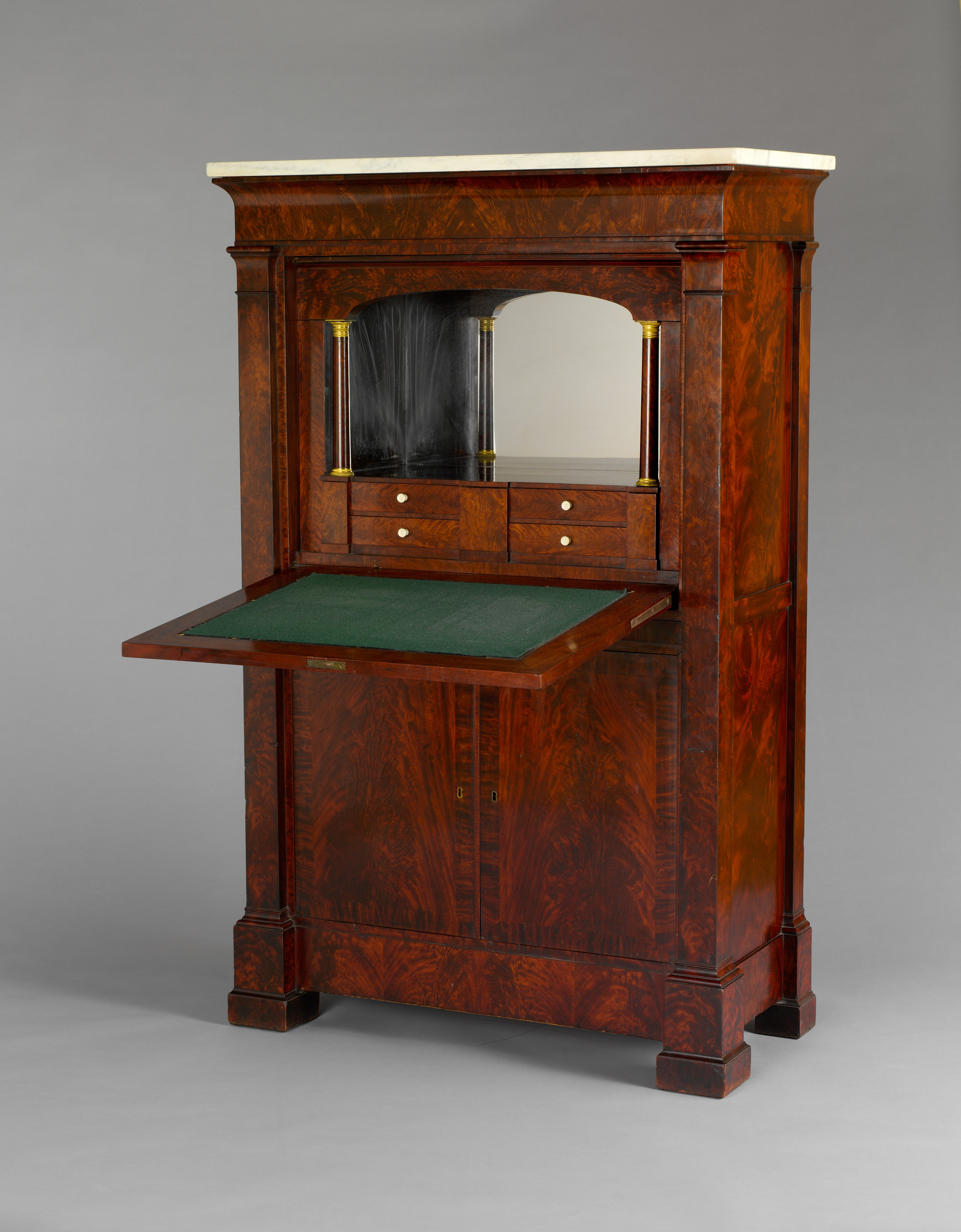
Secrétaire à abattant, Attributed to the Workshop of Duncan Phyfe or attributed to Duncan Phyfe & Sons, Made in New York, New York, 1835–47

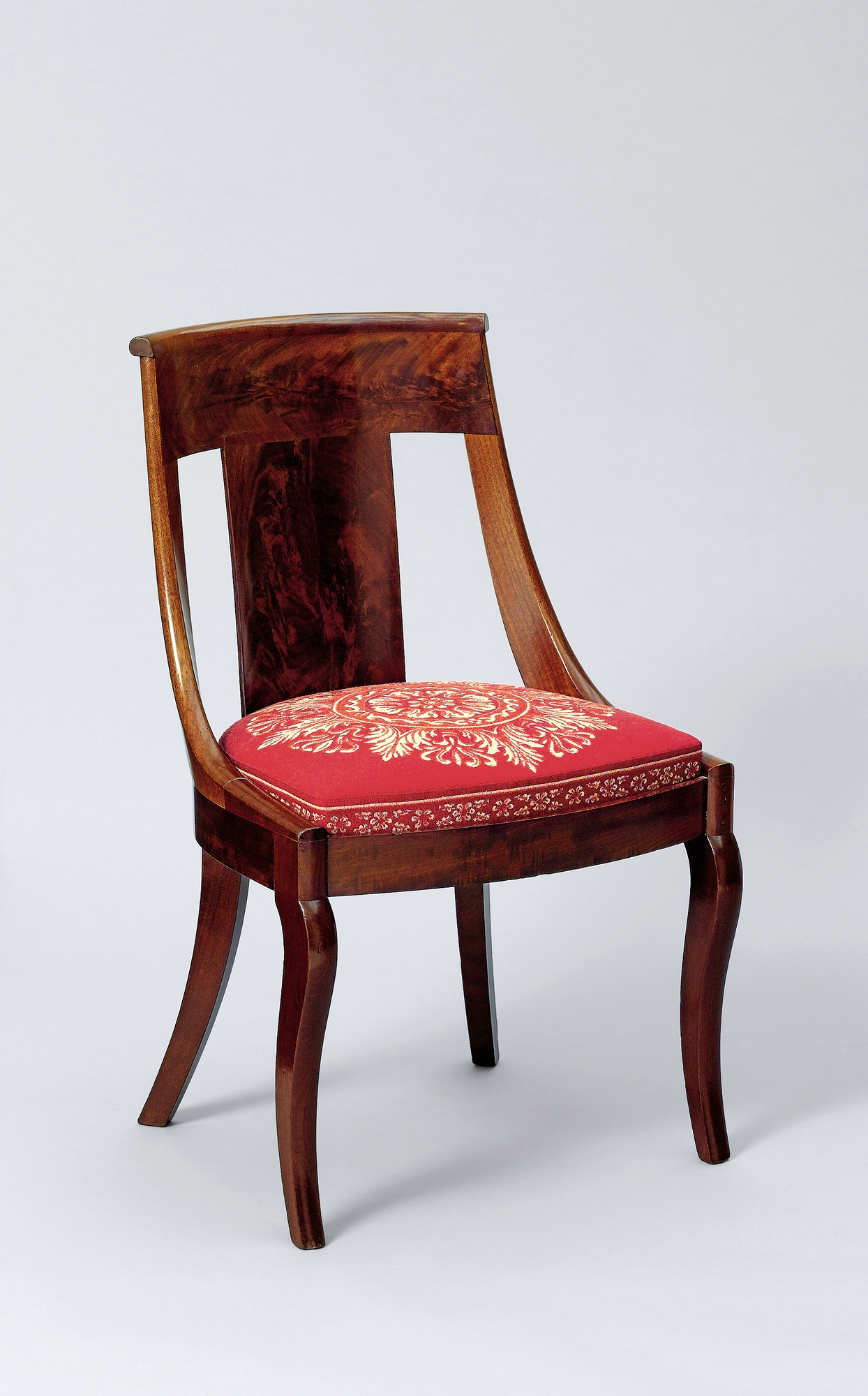
Side Chair, Attributed to Workshop of Duncan Phyfe, Made in New York, New York, circa 1837

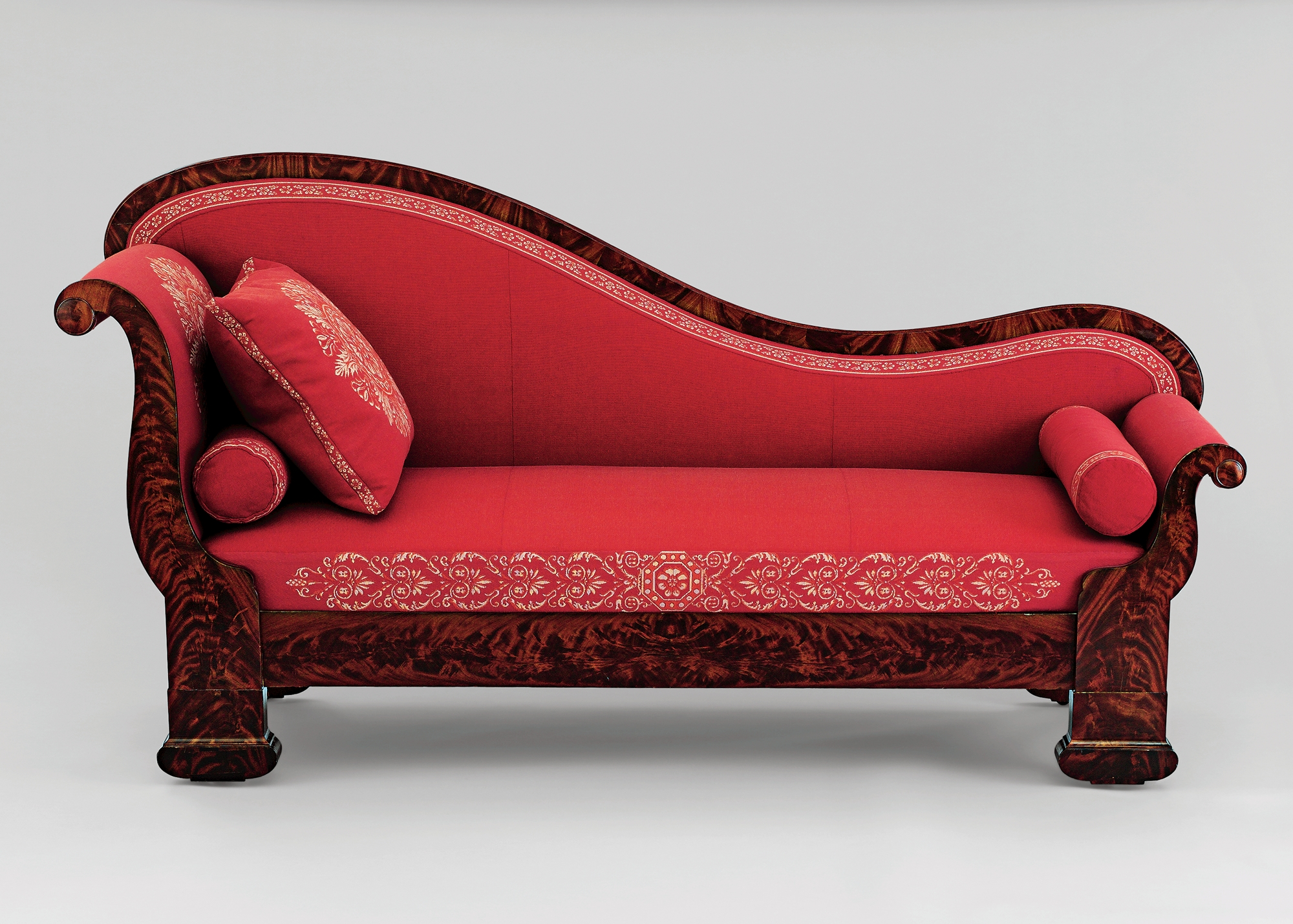
Couch, Attributed to the Workshop of Duncan Phyfe, Made in New York, New York, circa 1837

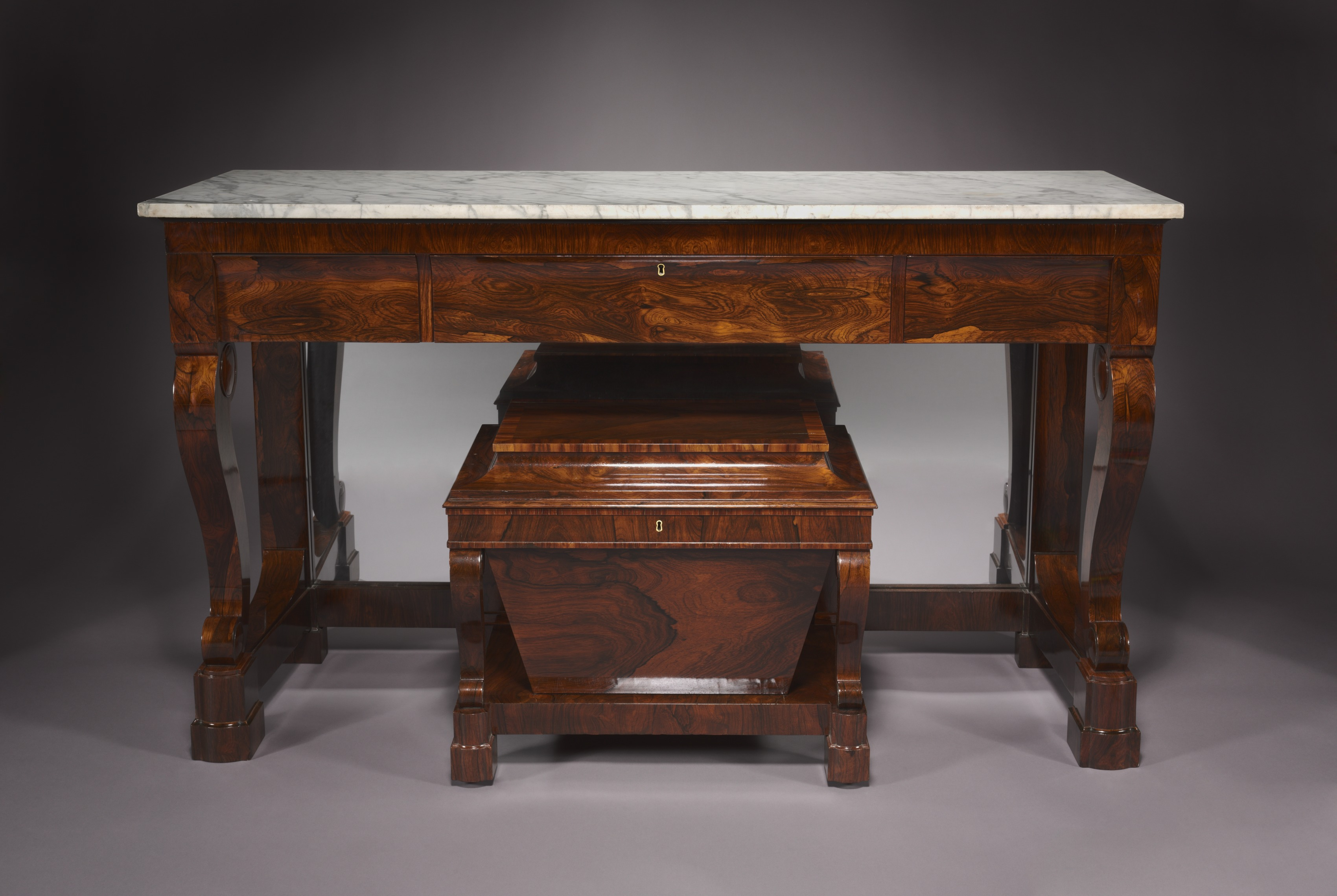
Sideboard and Cellarette, Duncan Phyfe and Son, Made in New York, New York, circa 1840

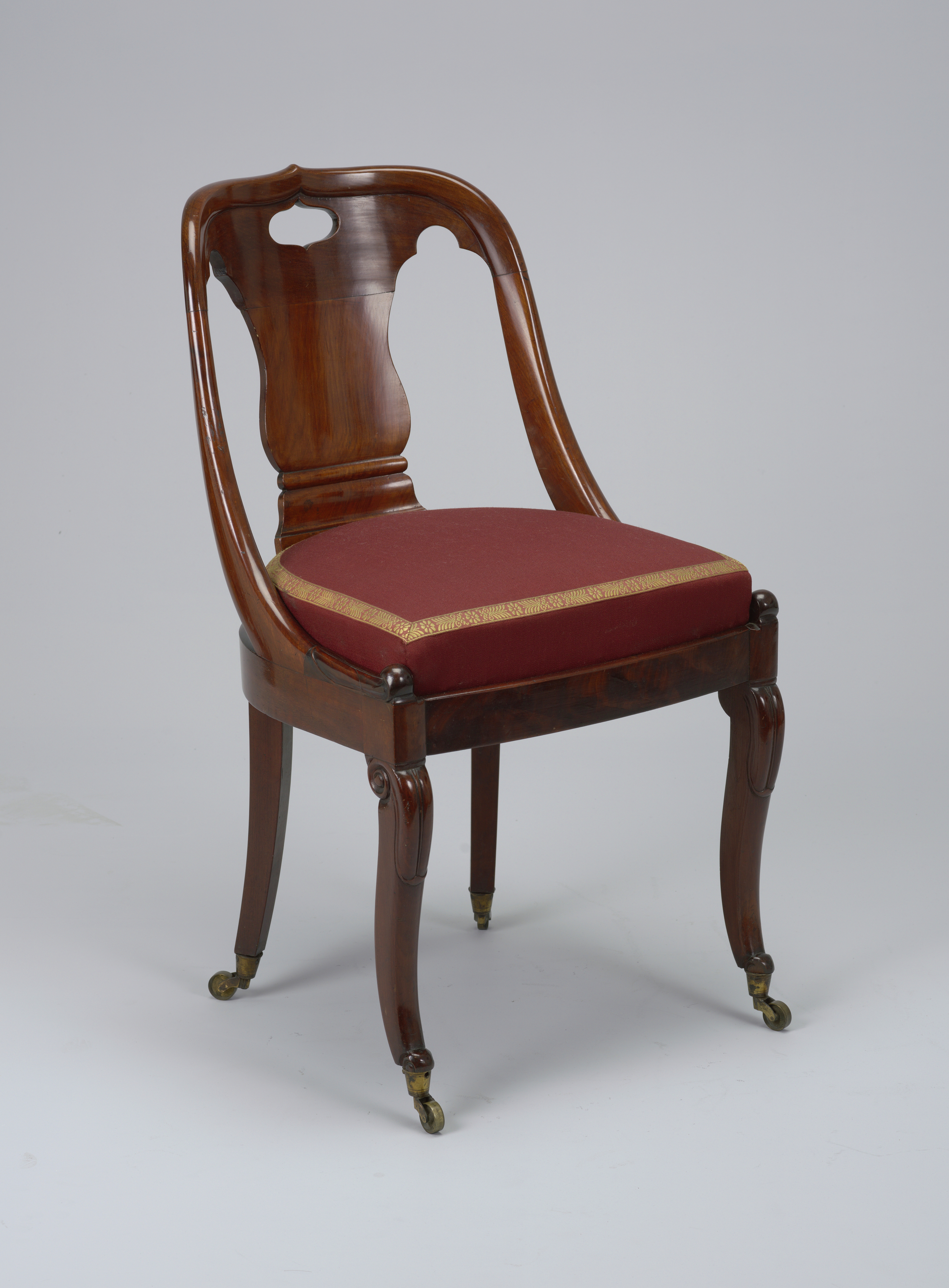
Side Chair, circa 1840

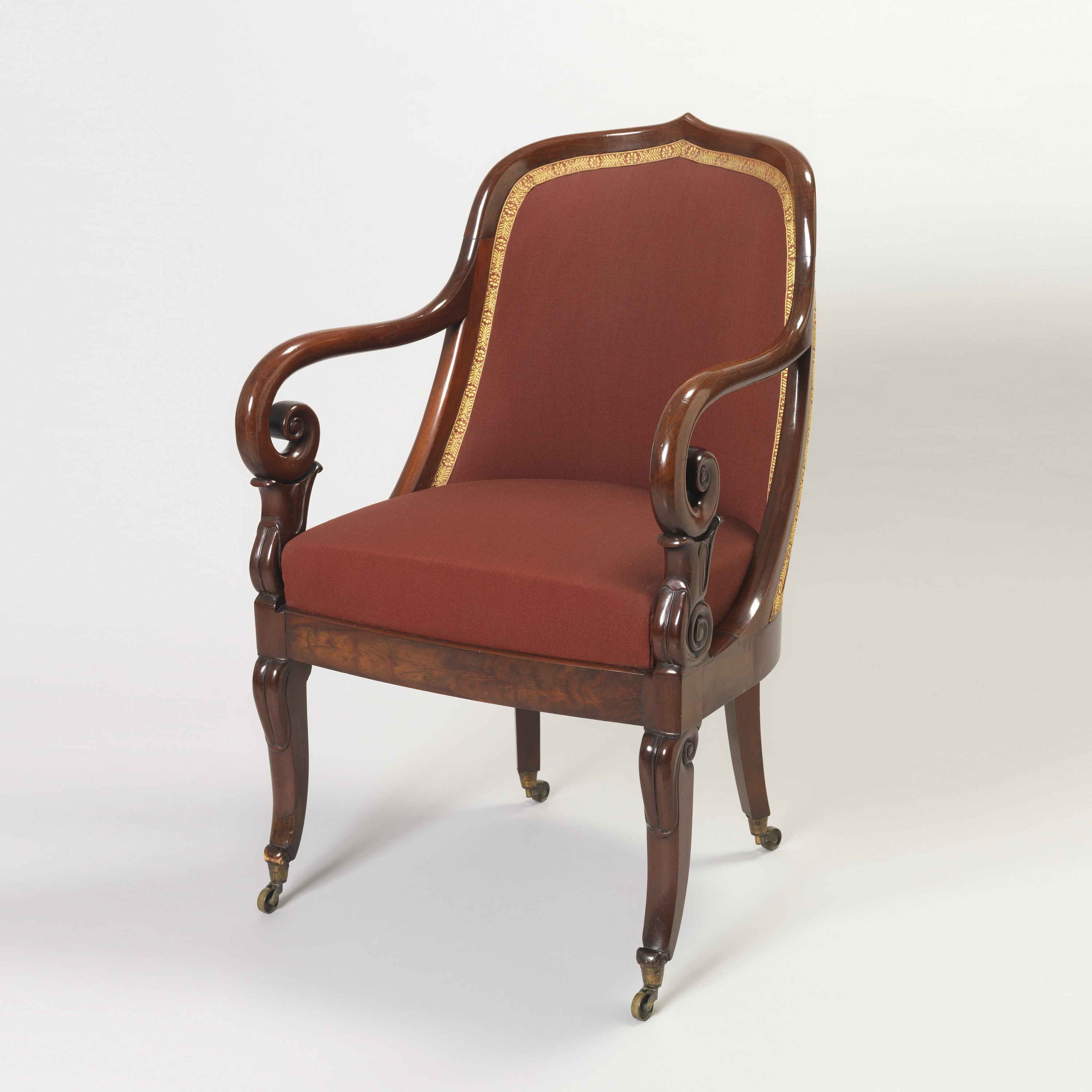
Armchair, circa 1840

== See also ==
- Federal furniture
- Lighthouse clock
- Classical American Homes Preservation Trust
