= America's Caribbean =

Loosely used nickname for the U.S. Virgin Islands and for Florida's Key West

America's Caribbean is a loosely used nickname for the U.S. Virgin Islands and for Florida's Key West. For instance the U.S. Travel and Tourism Administration and the USVI Commissioner of Tourism as well as other tourist and cruise companies use this term thus avoiding mentioning specific destination.
