= Jed Johnson (interior designer) =

American designer and film director

- Johnson by Andy Warhol in 1973
- Born: December 30, 1948; Alexandria, Minnesota, U.S.
- Died: July 17, 1996 (aged 47); Atlantic Ocean, off the coast of East Moriches, New York, U.S.
- Occupations: Film director, interior designer
- Partner(s): Andy Warhol (1968–1980); Alan Wanzenberg (1980–1996)
- Relatives: Jay Johnson (twin brother)

Jed Johnson (December 30, 1948 – July 17, 1996) was an American interior designer and film director. He first came to prominence through his close association with pop artist Andy Warhol before becoming recognized for his influential design work. The New York Times hailed him as "one of the most celebrated interior designers of our time."

Raised in California, Johnson moved to New York in 1968, where he began working at Warhol's Factory performing odd jobs. Following an assassination attempt on Warhol, Johnson moved in with the artist to aid in his recovery, and the two maintained a romantic partnership for 12 years. At the Factory, Johnson progressed from assisting Warhol and director Paul Morrissey to directing his own film, Bad (1977). He also edited several notable works, including Trash (1970), Heat (1972), Flesh for Frankenstein (1973), and Blood for Dracula (1974). After Warhol's death, Johnson was a founding member of the Andy Warhol Art Authentication Board.

In addition to his work in film, Johnson became a highly acclaimed interior designer. Beginning with the decoration of the townhouse he shared with Warhol, he developed a distinctive style that combined minimalist elegance with bold, dramatic accents. He collected antiques and built a high-profile clientele that included Mick Jagger, Pierre Bergé, Yves Saint Laurent, and Barbra Streisand. Johnson's career was cut short when he was killed in the explosion of TWA Flight 800 in 1996.

Leaving behind a lasting impact on contemporary interior design, Johnson was posthumously inducted into the Interior Design Hall of Fame in 1996. Architectural Digest later named him as one of "The World's 20 Greatest Designers of All Time." In 2005, Rizzoli published Jed Johnson: Opulent Restraint, Interiors, a monograph and tribute by his twin brother, Jay Johnson, documenting his work.

== Life and career ==
=== Early life and education ===
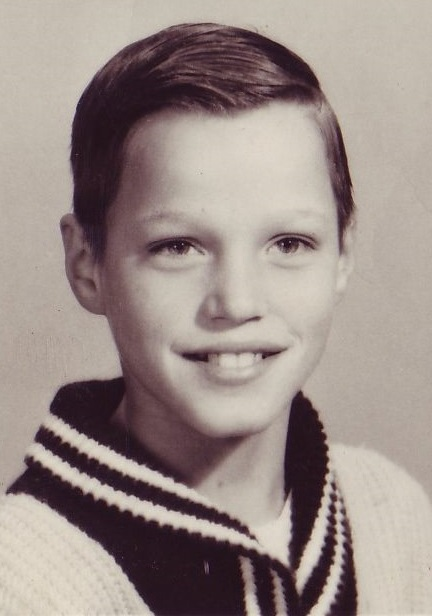
Childhood photo of Johnson

Jed Johnson was born in Alexandria, Minnesota, on December 30, 1948. He was the fourth of six children, born fifteen minutes after his fraternal twin brother Jay Johnson. They had two older brothers, Craig and Larry, and two younger sisters, Nancy and Susan. At the age of 10, Johnson's family moved to Scottsdale, Arizona, for eight months before settling in Fair Oaks, California, where his father worked in construction. His mother, Vivian Christopher, was the family's sole provider after his parents' divorce, and his father returned to Minnesota.

Johnson and journalist Joan Lunden were junior high school sweethearts and remained lifelong friends. While in high school, Johnson took a summer school class in architecture at American River Junior College in Sacramento, California. After graduating from Bella Vista High School in 1967, he attended American River College.

Johnson and Jay decided to take a semester off and drive cross-country to Montreal, Canada, by car with an AWOL soldier. Their first stop was San Francisco, where they went to the Avalon Ballroom, and they saw musician Jimi Hendrix perform at The Fillmore in February 1968. Their car broke down on the Santa Monica Freeway while they were leaving Los Angeles after a brief stop, so they hitchhiked to Chicago, where they saw their father, who was visiting family. They boarded a train bound for Montreal, but immigration officials stopped them near Buffalo, New York. They were kicked off the train because they were thought to be draft evaders, so they took a Greyhound bus to New York City instead.

=== Early days in New York and the Factory ===
The brothers found an apartment in Manhattan's East Village through a heroin addict, but were mugged and lost their last $200. When they went to collect money their mother had sent them, they were instead offered jobs at Western Union.

On his third day working for Western Union in February 1968, Johnson delivered a telegram to the Decker building at 33 Union Square West, where Pop artist Andy Warhol had recently relocated his studio, the Factory. Paul Morrissey, Warhol's film collaborator and overseer of the Factory, liked the well-mannered messenger and hired him to help get the Factory into shape. Johnson began by stripping wood and quickly advanced to more general tasks, becoming the Factory's first regular salaried employee since Gerard Malanga. According to Malanga, Johnson briefly assisted Warhol with silkscreening, but disliked the hands-on, messy nature of the process, prompting Warhol to call Malanga back to resume the work.

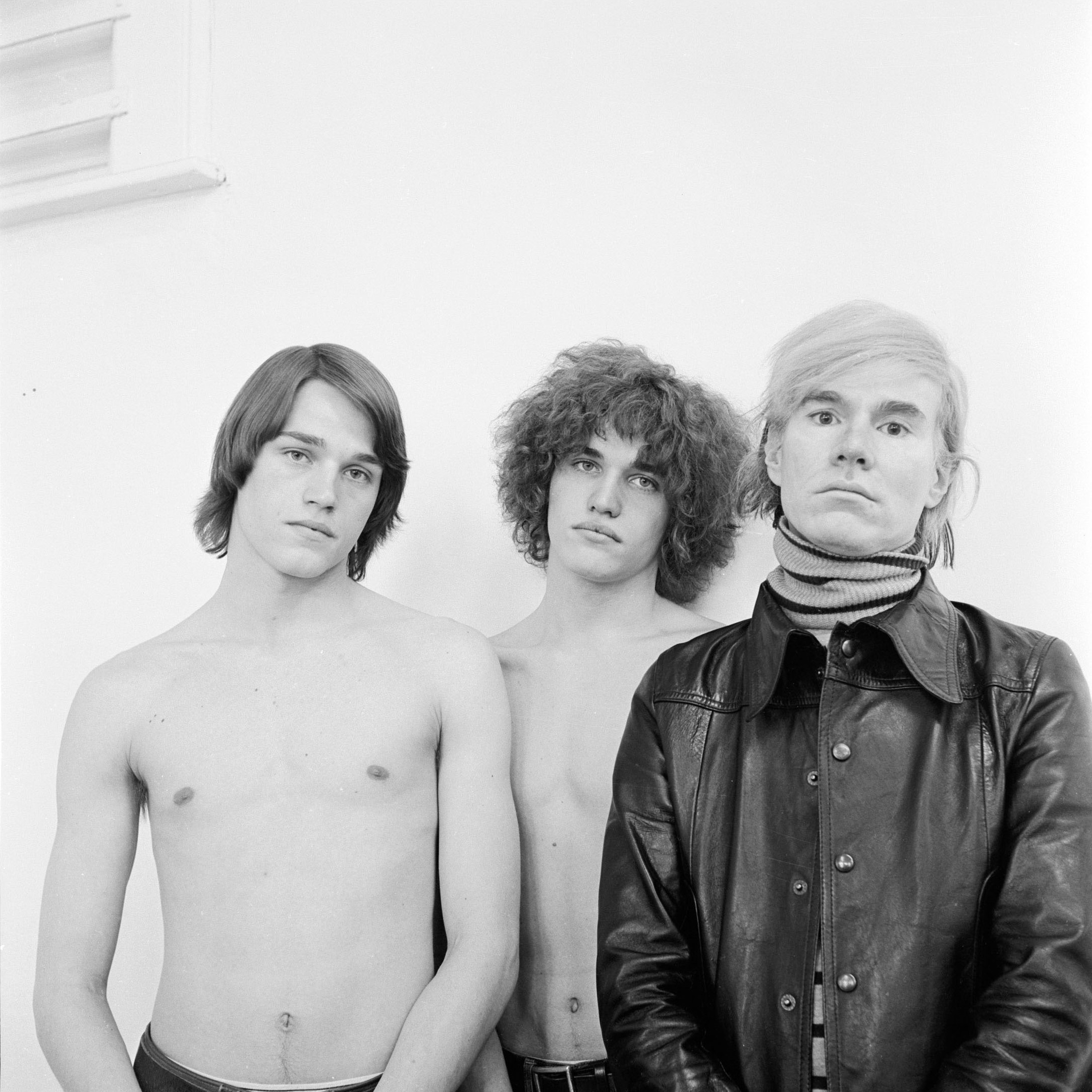
Johnson, Jay Johnson, and Andy Warhol photographed by Cecil Beaton at the Factory, 1969.

Warhol also allowed Johnson and his brother to use his charge account at Max's Kansas City. After seeing their building, he expressed concern about the neighborhood's safety and encouraged Johnson to find a better apartment. They soon moved to a sixth-floor walk-up on East 17th Street and Irving Place with help from Warhol, who loaned Johnson $350 in key money for the deposit. The new apartment—still modest, with a bathtub in the kitchen and a toilet in the hall—placed them close to the Factory and around the corner from Max's.

Shortly after their move, radical feminist Valerie Solanas shot Warhol at the Factory on June 3, 1968. Warhol and Solanas had arrived at the building at the same time as Johnson, who had just returned from the hardware store, and the three rode the elevator up together. Johnson was in the back installing fluorescent lights when Solanas opened fire. He hid in Warhol's office, and when Solanas attempted to enter, he held the door shut to keep her out. As Warhol was taken to Columbus Hospital, Johnson and Warhol's business manager Fred Hughes were detained for questioning at the 13th Precinct police station until Solanas surrendered later that evening.

=== Relationship with Andy Warhol and film career ===
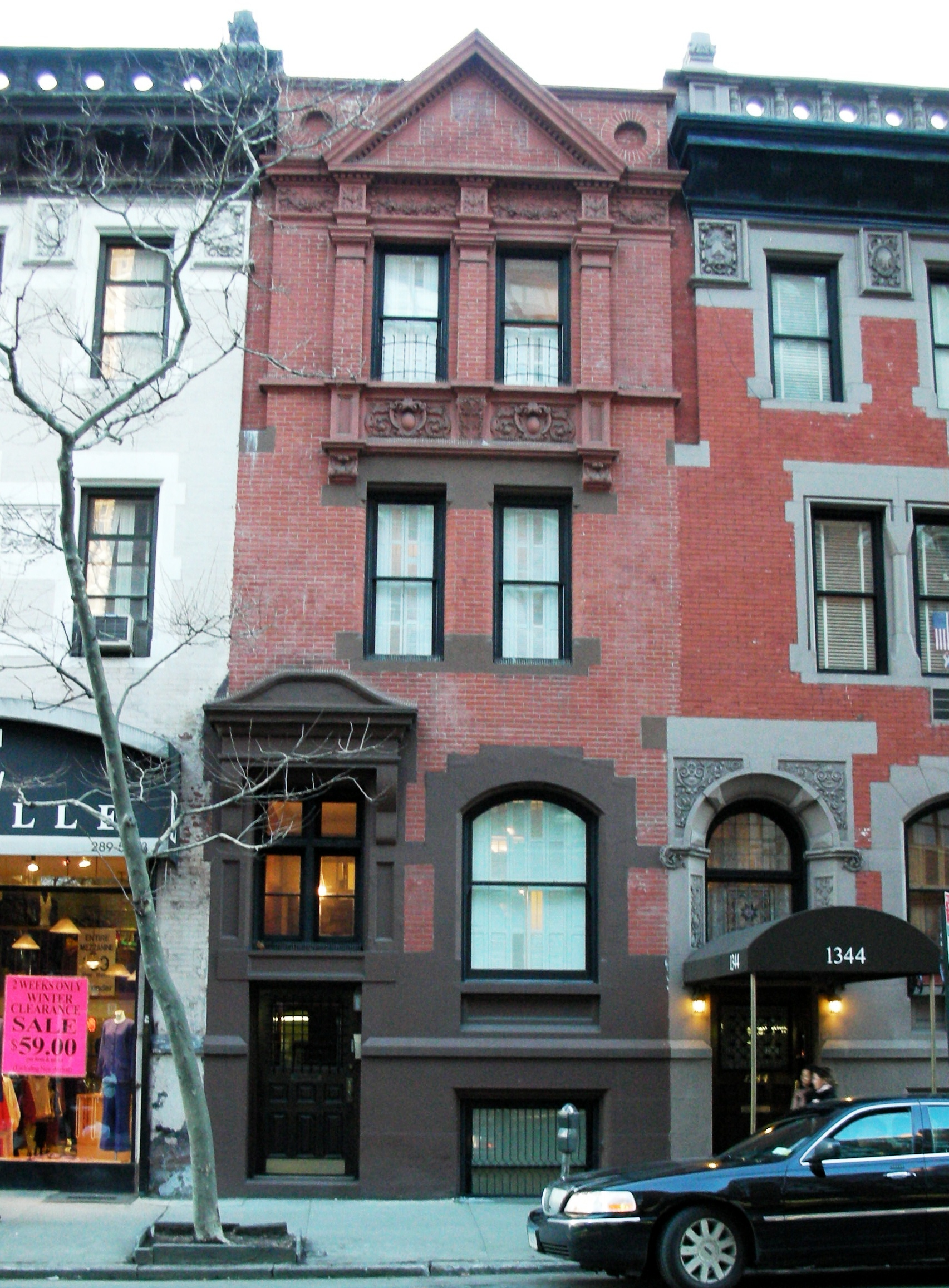
From 1968 to 1974, Johnson lived with Andy Warhol at 1342 Lexington Ave in the Carnegie Hill neighborhood of Manhattan.

Johnson visited Warhol daily during his hospitalization, and the two developed a close and enduring bond. Subsequently, Johnson moved into Warhol's Northern Renaissance Revival-style townhouse at 1342 Lexington Avenue in Carnegie Hill to help him recuperate and look after his ailing mother, Julia Warhola. During Warhol's recovery, a romance blossomed, and Johnson came to "fill the traditional role of a devoted young spouse." Johnson brought order to the household by painting the walls, arranging the furniture, and clearing out the clutter in the townhouse. He also accompanied Warhol's mother on weekly visits to the doctor and cared for her two elderly cats. Warhol's physician and friend Denton Cox later recalled of Johnson, "Jed was not in it for ulterior reasons. He loved Andy. In the early years, they were joined at the hip."

After expressing interest in working on sound, Warhol and Morrissey trained Johnson, and he started assisting them on their underground films. He taught himself how to edit film on the Factory's Moviola using clips of Lonesome Cowboy (1968). Warhol had intended for Johnson to edit his film San Diego Surf (1968), but after he was shot, the project was shelved. While Warhol was hospitalized, Johnson assisted Morrissey with filming Flesh (1968), in which he makes a cameo, and he did the sound for Blue Movie (1969). He also appeared as a hippie partygoer in John Schlesinger's Midnight Cowboy (1969).

Like Warhol, Johnson developed a strong interest in photography. In 1969, his work appeared in Al Hansen's underground magazine Kiss, which featured a gossip column by Warhol. Later that year, he became a staff photographer for Warhol's Interview magazine.

Described as intensely quiet and shy, Johnson was Warhol's constant companion. He was an integral part of Warhol's inner circle, traveling with him for museum exhibitions, gallery shows, and portrait commissions. The press referred to Johnson as "Andy's shadow" and "Warhol's new standard of male beauty." In 1971, Warhol designed the cover for the Rolling Stones' album Sticky Fingers, which features a man's crotch in blue jeans with a real zipper. Although several people have claimed to be the man on the album cover, Johnson is generally believed to have been the model.

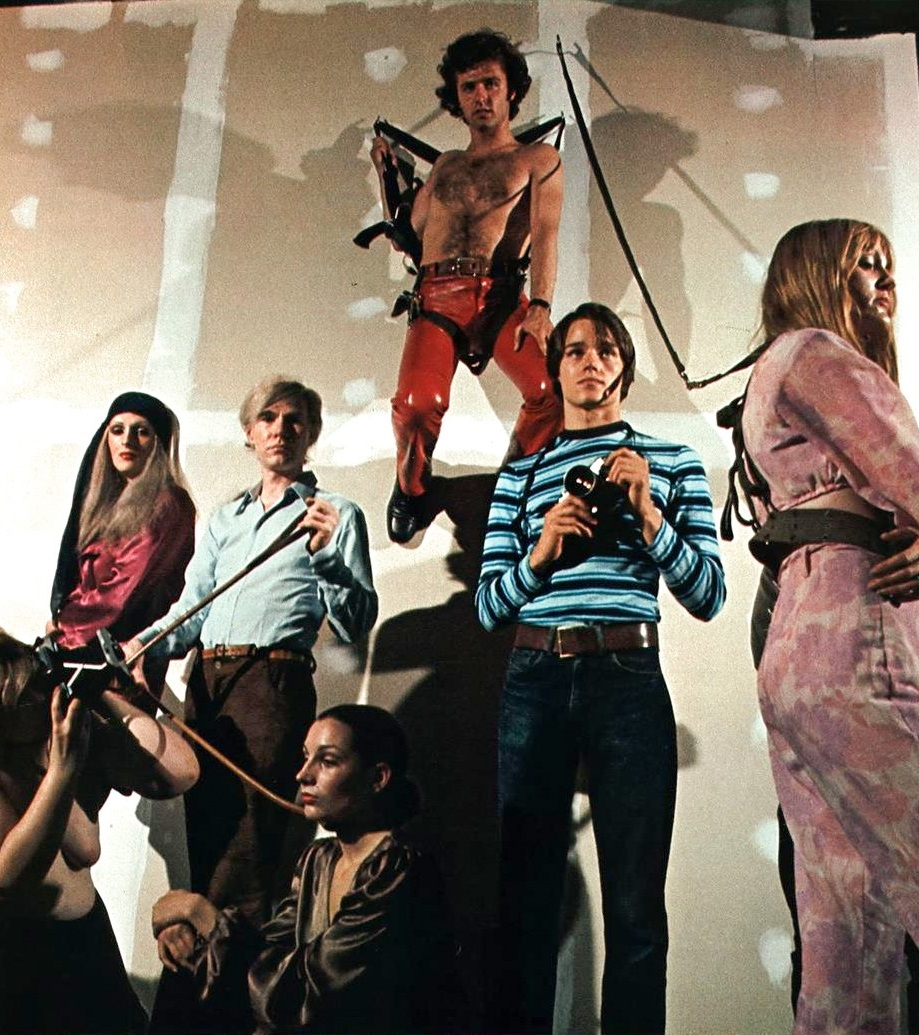
Johnson (holding a camera) with Warhol and members of the Factory: Candy Darling, Brigid Berlin,Geraldine Smith, Gerard Malanga, and Ingrid Superstar. Photo by Claude Picasso for Esquire, 1969.

As an editor, Johnson worked on the films Trash (1970), Heat (1972), L'Amour (1972), Flesh for Frankenstein (1973), and Blood for Dracula (1974). He made his directorial debut with Bad (1977), starring Carroll Baker, which received mixed reviews. Although the film was a commercial failure, Johnson maintained that it was a good film while acknowledging that he had been in over his head. After its release, he abandoned filmmaking and began buying and selling antiques. His film Bad has since become a cult classic.

In 1977, Johnson's relationship with Warhol began to deteriorate, spurred on by Warhol's partying and his friendship with Victor Hugo. Johnson recalled: "When Studio 54 opened things changed with Andy. That was New York when it was at the height of its most decadent period, and I didn't take part. … I was always really shy and had a really hard time socially anyway, and I didn't like the people. Andy was just wasting his time, and it was really upsetting."

Johnson struggled with depression, which was exacerbated by Warhol being emotionally distant. during their relationship, he attempted suicide twice, in 1970 and 1978. Johnson also aspired to become a pilot and paid for flying lessons in the early 1970s, but was unable to obtain his license due to his first suicide attempt. "Jed missed the affection—verbally and physically. Andy wasn't capable of expressing it in the way Jed needed … Jed felt very strongly about the relationship. He definitely had strong feelings for Andy, and it caused him a lot of pain," his brother Jay Johnson said.

In October 1980, while still residing with Warhol, Johnson purchased a duplex apartment to use as an office for his decorating business at 15 West 67th Street. On December 21, 1980, Johnson informed Warhol that he had decided to move out and live in the duplex when he returned from a skiing trip in Colorado. A few days later, Johnson called Warhol on Christmas, but he would not come to the phone. He also gave him a Christmas card in which he wrote: "Andy, I don't know what you are looking for. Sorry you didn't find it at home. I don't think (or don't want to think) you'll get it from your Victors and Kevins and nights at Studio 54. You did have all my love and respect. I'm sorry it went wrong. Thinking of you with sincere love, Jed." Following their split, they shared custody of their two dachshunds, Archie and Amos.

In 1982, Warhol amended his will to exclude Johnson. His business manager Fred Hughes remained the executor, and Vincent Fremont, vice president of Andy Warhol Enterprises, replaced Johnson as the backup executor. Despite this, friends and Factory associates perceived their breakup as one of Warhol's biggest regrets. According to a friend, Warhol showed him a photograph of Johnson that he kept in his wallet several years after their separation. Likewise, Johnson was devastated when Warhol died following gallbladder surgery in February 1987. He later spoke to biographer Victor Bockris about the "real strong influence" of Warhol's presence in his life. He said, "I still feel him today. When I do something I think, Well, gee, how would Andy do it?" In 1995, Johnson became a founding member of the Andy Warhol Art Authentication Board, which was a private corporation that certified the authenticity of works by Warhol.

Throughout their relationship, Johnson amassed several of Warhol's paintings, including Silver Elvis, Front and Back Dollar Bills, Mao, Flowers, Self-Portrait, and a print portfolio of Electric Chair. Warhol also created portraits of Johnson and their dachshunds. Johnson's twin brother Jay Johnson inherited his art collection after his death.

=== Early interior design career ===
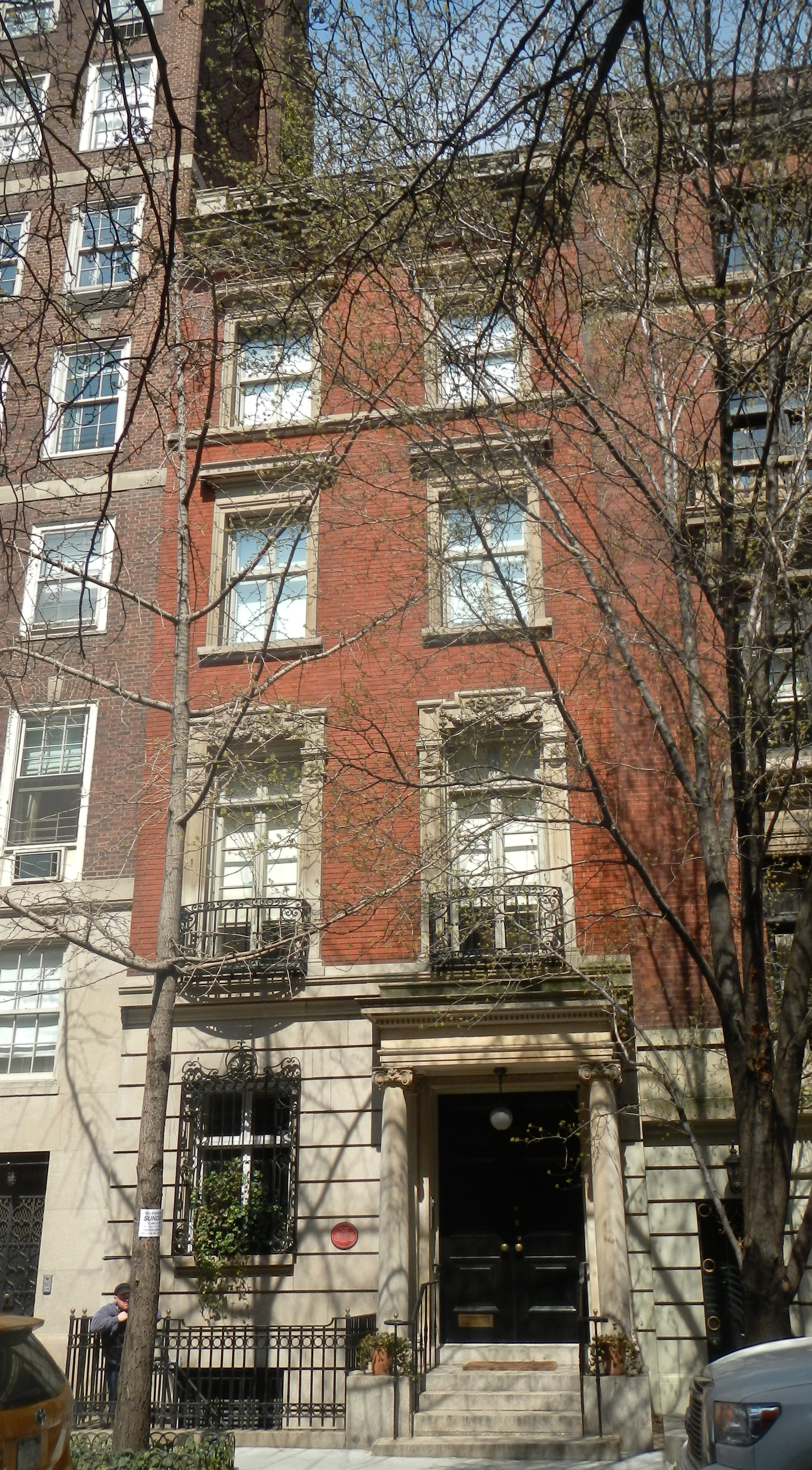
From 1974 to 1980, Johnson lived with Warhol at 57 E 66th St on the Upper East Side of Manhattan. He ran his decorating business from the townhouse, which was designated a cultural landmark in 1998.

As Warhol's collecting increasingly overwhelmed their Lexington Avenue townhouse, Johnson encouraged him to move to a larger home. By late 1973, Johnson was scouting properties and reporting back to Warhol. In January 1974, Warhol purchased a Neo-Georgian townhouse at 57 East 66th Street in Lenox Hill, reflecting his investment in their domestic life. Johnson, who had enjoyed organizing their previous home, oversaw the interior decoration and collaborated with architect Peter Marino on renovations to the kitchens and bathrooms.

The townhouse served as a canvas for Johnson, who drew inspiration from the furniture and collections he saw during his travels with Warhol over the years. When Warhol saw that the few pieces of "primitive country furniture" he had purchased looked out of place in the townhouse's "new high, classical spaces," he encouraged Johnson to find more appropriate furniture. Johnson's shopping became a dedicated search for period furnishings suited to their home. He assigned various rooms in the house to distinct period styles, experimenting with three different styles: Neoclassical, Art Deco, and Victorian. Art collector Stuart Pivar, a friend of the couple, said, "Jed built period rooms of such refinement and perfection. The level of quality in that house had no equal." "Jed influenced Andy to appreciate fine old things. It probably influenced Andy towards the classical theme of art," he added.

In 1974, Warhol relocated the Factory from the Decker Building at 33 Union Square West to the Butler Building at 860 Broadway, and Johnson enlisted Marino to assist him with the remodeling. In 1977, Johnson established a decorating business with antique collector Judith Hollander, operating from a room on the fourth floor of his townhouse.

Johnson was a close friend of Sandy Brant, who was the director of advertising for Warhol's Interview magazine. Her husband, businessman Peter Brant, helped finance Interview and Warhol's films. In 1977, Johnson collaborated with Sandy on interior schemes for an office building in Greenwich, Connecticut owned by Peter and his business partner Joe Allen.

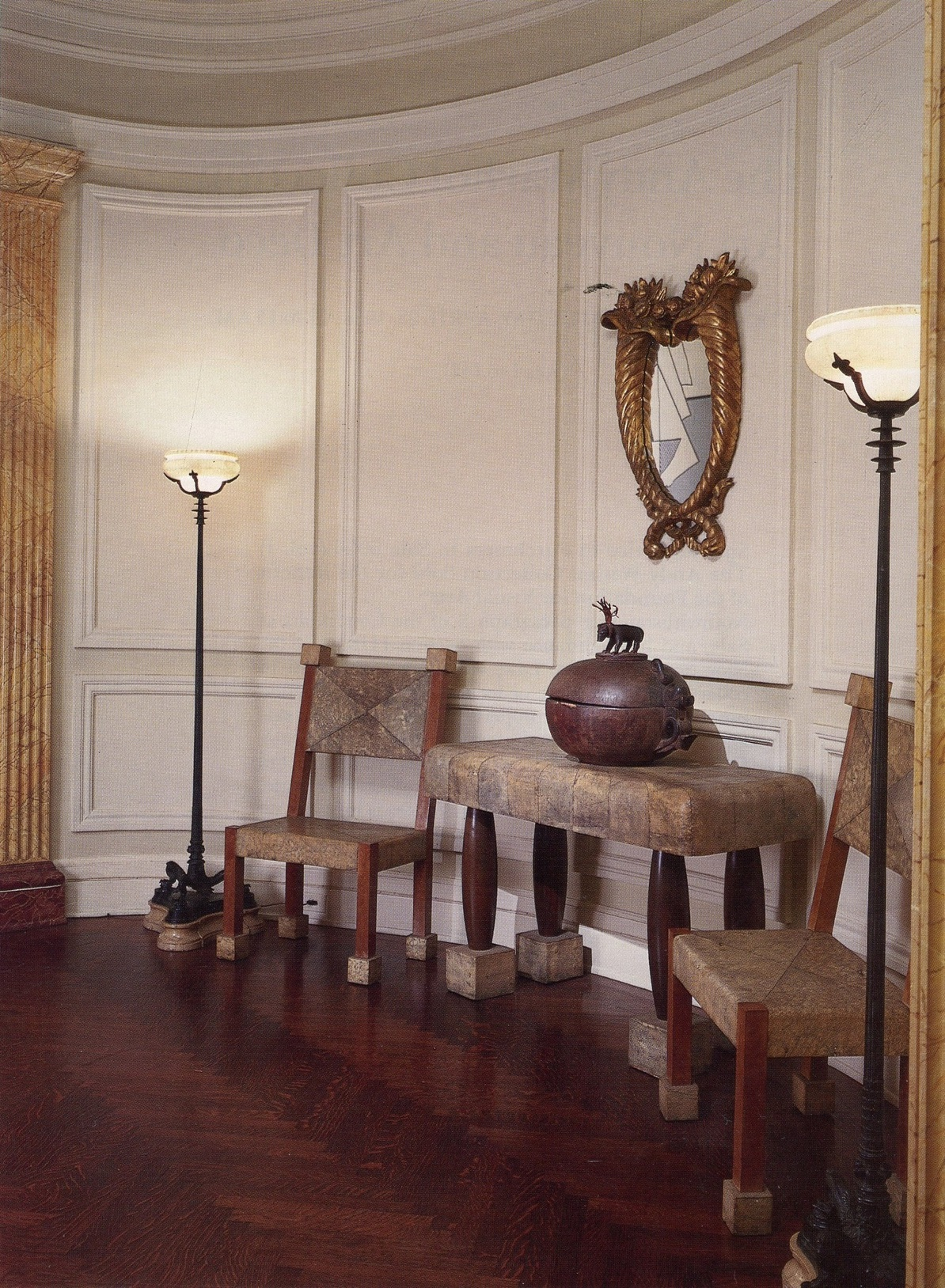
The second-floor landing of Andy Warhol's townhouse, designed by Johnson, featured Legrain throne chairs and a console.

Johnson also purchased a house in Vail, Colorado with the Brants, where their commissioned ski house—known as the Brant-Johnson House—was completed in 1977. Designed by Venturi & Rauch, the residence was featured in the October 1977 issue of Progressive Architecture. Its design drew on Art Nouveau and the Arts and Crafts movement, emphasizing vertical massing, angular geometry, and extensive use of natural wood. The interiors incorporated built-in wooden furnishings alongside period wicker and Mission-style oak furniture by Gustav Stickley. Johnson later decorated the Brants' White Birch Farm home in Greenwich after its completion in 1983.

Warhol's connections helped Johnson build a network of celebrity clients. He recommended Johnson to French businessman Pierre Bergé and his business partner Yves Saint Laurent, suggesting they adopt the aesthetic of his own townhouse. This led to Johnson's first commission: decorating Bergé's pied-à-terre at The Pierre hotel in New York City. "Jed took me to see Mark Twain's house," Bergé recalled. "I saw the stencils and then the furniture. And it seemed like a great idea to do an American apartment."

Johnson collaborated with Hollander and Marino on the project. The apartment featured Neo-Grec and American Empire style furniture, stenciled friezes, and lush furnishings. It was showcased in Vogue's May 1979 issue, which described it as having "a warm, comfortable, rich ambience unlike any other in the city." In 1979, Johnson and Hollander designed the Yves Saint Laurent Enterprises offices in New York with architect Michael Hollander.

=== Design partnership with Alan Wanzenberg and later life ===
In 1980, Johnson met architect Alan Wanzenberg through a mutual friend, art dealer Thomas Ammann. After becoming friends, the two began working together professionally and subsequently had an affair. By 1981, Wanzenberg had moved into Johnson's apartment on Manhattan's West Side. In 1982, they co-founded a design firm, which they operated jointly until establishing separate practices years later as Alan Wanzenberg Architect P.C. and Jed Johnson & Associates. Despite the split, they continued to collaborate professionally, sharing a home office and resources. Although Johnson completed much of his later work with Wanzenberg, he also enjoyed collaborating with other architects, designing interiors for houses by Cesar Pelli, Hugh Newell Jacobsen, Samuel White, and others.

By the mid-1980s, Johnson's business was billing millions of dollars annually and had attracted high-profile clients such as Mick Jagger, Jerry Hall, Bianca Jagger, Barbra Streisand, Richard Gere, and Carl Icahn. Johnson was also known for his generosity, often sending furniture to friends who could not afford his services.

During Andy Warhol's lifetime, he did not allow his townhouse to be photographed for design magazines. After his death in 1987, Johnson worked with photographer Elizabeth Heyert to document the interiors for her book Metropolitan Places (1989), preserving the atmosphere he had created in the house before Warhol's collection was dispersed. Johnson also wrote an essay for Vol 5: Americana and European and American Paintings, Drawings and Prints, of the Sotheby's catalog for the landmark auction of Warhol's collection in 1988. That year, Johnson and the dachshunds Archie and Amos, whom he had raised with Warhol, were photographed for an ASPCA benefit exhibition. The show, The Four-Footed, Finned or Feathered Four Hundred, featured 245 photographs of prominent New Yorkers and their pets.

In 1988, Johnson designed a new exhibition space for the Sperone Westwater Gallery in New York and was also among the designers invited to participate in the 13th annual WESTWEEK at the Pacific Design Center in Los Angeles. In 1989, he renovated the new headquarters of Interview magazine. They also designed restaurants, including Cafe Spiga at 1022 Third Avenue, which opened in February 1989, and Punsch at 11 West 60th Street, which opened in January 1990.

Johnson was active in AIDS-related fundraising efforts. In 1990, he organized the "A Bid of Love" benefit auction at Sotheby's with ballet dancers Heather Watts, Jock Soto, and art patron Beth Rudin DeWoody. In 1991, Johnson and Wanzenberg participated in Metropolitan Home magazine's ShowHouse benefit for the Design Industries Foundation for AIDS (DIFFA) in New York City.

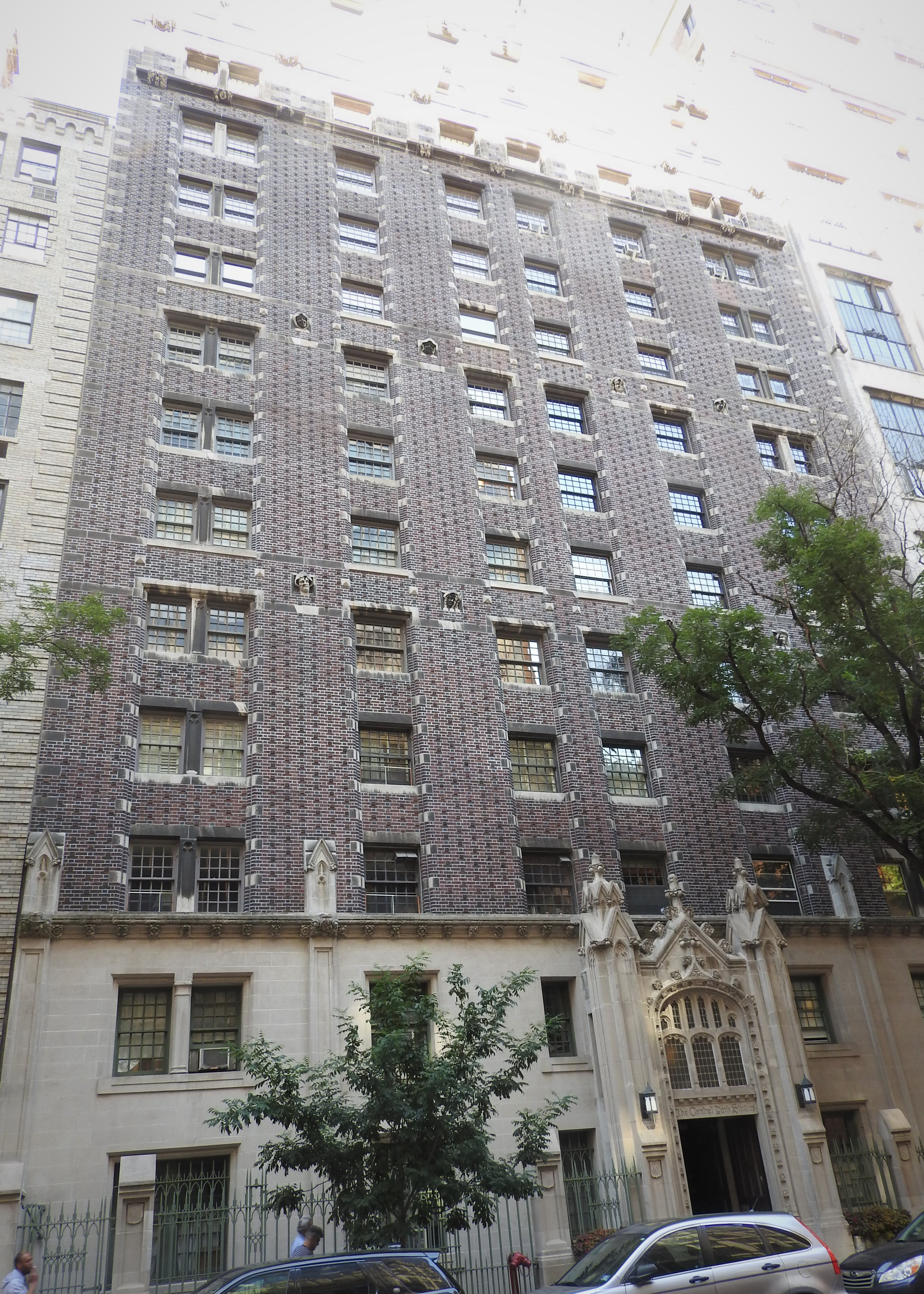
From 1980 to 1996, Johnson resided at 15 W 67th St on the Upper West Side of Manhattan. His duplex also served as the office for his interior design business.

In 1994, Barbaralee Diamonstein and Carl Spielvogel commissioned Johnson, working with architect Samuel White of Buttrick White & Burtis, to renovate their home, Bonnie Dune, in Southampton, New York.

Thurston Twigg-Smith commissioned Johnson to decorate the Twin Farms resort in Barnard, Vermont. Johnson and Wanzenberg oversaw the renovation of the hotel's main house and the construction of three cottages in 1993, followed by the completion of five additional individually designed cottages in 1995.

In 1995, Johnson and Wanzenberg served as honorary chairmen of the Katonah Museum of Art's gala dinner dance at Purchase College in Purchase, New York. In the 1990s, they shared a dachshund named Gus and owned a two-home Fire Island property that had previously belonged to fashion designer Perry Ellis.

In 1996, art dealer Angela Westwater and her husband, David Meitus, enlisted Johnson and Wanzenberg to design their New York apartment. Johnson was the interior design consultant for the five-story Frédéric Fekkai Beauté de Provence Salon salon, located in the Chanel building on 57th Street, which opened in August 1996.

Johnson developed a strong interest in 18th-century crewelwork and embroidery, incorporating such textiles into his interiors. As these materials became increasingly scarce, he began commissioning hand-embroidered reproductions in India, a process that led to a partnership with London-based Mona Perlhagen, who oversaw Chelsea Textiles, the European counterpart to Johnson's planned New York venture, Chelsea Editions. Following his death, the showroom opened in 1996 with the support of his brother.

== Death ==
On July 17, 1996, Johnson was killed at the age of 47, when TWA Flight 800 exploded off the coast of Long Island, shortly after taking off from John F. Kennedy International Airport in New York City. As a passenger in first class, Johnson was killed instantly when the fuel tank exploded, and his body was one of the first recovered, a mile from the crash scene in the Atlantic Ocean. Johnson was traveling to Paris for a shopping trip to find antiques for a client's home. According to his friend Bob Colacello, Johnson was not originally intended to be on that flight, but as a valued customer, TWA offered him an upgrade from business class to first class if he departed the night before.

Johnson's lifelong friend Joan Lunden, co-host of Good Morning America, eulogized him on air. She spoke of their friendship and shared a photo of Johnson with Alan Wanzenberg, and expressed her condolences. She referred to Wanzenberg as his domestic partner, which drew praise from the Gay & Lesbian Alliance Against Defamation because Wanzenberg had only been referred to as Johnson's business partner in initial reports.

On July 24, 1996, a funeral service for Johnson was held at the New York Society for Ethical Culture building in Manhattan, with over 1,000 people—including Lunden, Bianca Jagger, and Joel Siegel—in attendance. Reverend Fred Turpin of the City Church of New York, who presided over the funeral, said "the stench of evil" surrounded the explosion. Fran Lebowitz, Pat Hackett, and Ruby Wax spoke about their friendship with Johnson. Wanzenberg attended the service with Gus, the dachshund he shared with Johnson. Aurora Bugarin, Johnson's housekeeper of 20 years, tried to reach for the casket as it was being put into a hearse after the service, but a friend pulled her back.

A four-year investigation concluded that the accident was most likely caused by the ignition of a flammable mixture of fuel vapor and air inside a fuel tank, triggered by an electrical short circuit. As a result, new regulations were passed to prevent future fuel tank ignitions in airplanes.

== Style and influence ==
Johnson's approach to interior design developed in part through his work organizing Andy Warhol's extensive collection of art, antiques, and decorative objects. Johnson recalled that Warhol "wasn't all that discriminating" in his collecting, which forced Johnson to become more selective and consider how individual pieces would work within an interior. He initially organized Warhol's possessions by period and style, including separate rooms devoted to Art Deco and Herter Brothers furniture, while also studying historical decorating techniques such as stenciling.

Johnson also began collecting furniture himself, purchasing American pieces from dealers and studying the work of Philadelphia cabinetmakers including Antoine Gabriel Quervelle and Joseph Barry. Their continually evolving townhouse became an informal education in design, as did their travels and visits to the homes of figures including Yves Saint Laurent, Hélène Rochas, and Stavros Niarchos. Johnson later described this exposure as an unconscious education in beauty and style: "It wasn't until after I had done several jobs that I said, 'Well, this is what I do.'"

Johnson … had the eye of a connoisseur and the compositional gift of an artist. His rooms were assemblages of splendid pieces, set in sensual wholes. He was as interested in fabric and texture as in mass and shape, which is why he could hang a Cy Twombly painting on eighteenth-century Chinese wallpaper or a Venetian-glass chandelier next to a huge nineteenth-century Irish scagliola urn. It was not the cleverness of the combination that intrigued Johnson; it was the way the shapes and the textures played off each other

— Paul Goldberger

In 1978, Pierre Bergé, chairman of Yves Saint Laurent, hired Johnson to decorate his newly acquired New York apartment. Johnson encouraged Bergé to furnish the apartment entirely with American art and antiques, and introduced him to American furniture and decorative traditions, including stenciled walls. Reflecting on the project in 1991, Johnson recalled, "Pierre's apartment was really my first job. I thought it would be my last. I had never planned to be a decorator." Johnson was subsequently commissioned to design the New York offices of Yves Saint Laurent. These early commissions established Johnson's reputation, and Interview described him in 1980 as a "master of interior design and period restoration."

While lacking formal design training, Johnson was known for his attention to detail and eclectic approach. "I look at all my various jobs as opportunities to learn. And I like to work in different styles. My work doesn't really have a signature to it," he said in 1988. He admired the work of designers including Renzo Mongiardino, Jacques Grange, Patrick Naggar, Peter Marino, Stephen Sill, and Philippe Starck. Alan Wanzenberg, Johnson's partner and professional collaborator, noted that "at a time when no one else did, Jed saw the connection between Arts and Crafts furniture and modern art." Art dealer Angela Westwater, who commissioned Johnson to design her New York residence, described him as a "master colorist," and said, "Jed knew about art—it was part of his vocabulary. The restraint which characterized his design aesthetic combined with his personal experience in the art world were appropriate attributes for creating a context for our art collection."

== Legacy ==
Following his death in 1996, House & Garden devoted an issue to Johnson, while Architectural Digest published a five-page photographic feature on his work. His friend Ingrid Sischy, editor-in-chief of Interview, memorialized him in the magazine's Winter 1996 issue. In 1996, Johnson was inducted posthumously into the Interior Design Hall of Fame.

Johnson's twin brother, Jay Johnson, became president of Jed Johnson & Associates and carried out his plans to open a textiles showroom in New York's Fine Arts Building in 1996. Chelsea Editions specialized in high-quality, historically accurate embroidered textiles for the design trade.

In 1997, Johnson's protégé Arthur Dunnam was appointed the design director of Jed Johnson & Associates and the company became Jed Johnson Associates. In 2017, it was rebranded as Arthur Dunnam for Jed Johnson Studio. In 2024, the company was renamed Dunnam Zerbini Design.

In 2005, Jay Johnson established Jed Johnson Home to pay tribute to and carry on his brother's legacy by offering designers and architects luxury textiles for interior usage.

In 2005, Rizzoli published the book Jed Johnson: Opulent Restraint, Interiors, a monograph documenting his career. Organized by Jay Johnson, the book has contributions from Paul Goldberger, Bob Colacello, Pierre Berge, and Sandy Brant. A celebratory re-edition of the book was released in 2023.

In 2010, Johnson was named by Architectural Digest as one of "The World's 20 Greatest Designers of All Time."

In 2022, Johnson's relationship with Warhol was explored in the Netflix docuseries The Andy Warhol Diaries.

== Filmography ==
Year	Film	Role
1968	Flesh	Actor (uncredited)
1969	Midnight Cowboy	Actor (uncredited)
1969	Blue Movie	Sound
1970	Trash	Editor
1971	Women in Revolt	Associate producer; cinematographer
1972	Heat	Associate producer; editor
1972	L'Amour	Cinematographer; editor
1973	Flesh for Frankenstein	Editor
1974	Blood for Dracula	Editor
1977	Andy Warhol's Bad	Director
