= Alan Wanzenberg =

American architect and designer

- Born: May 5, 1951 (age 75); Evanston, Illinois, U.S.
- Education: University of California, Berkeley (BS); Harvard University (M.Arch.)
- Occupations: Architect, interior designer
- Partner(s): Jed Johnson (1980–1996); Peter Kelly (2003–present)

Alan Wanzenberg (born May 5, 1951) is an American architect and designer based in New York City. He has been named to Architectural Digest's annual AD100 list of leading architects and designers several times.

A graduate of the University of California, Berkeley and Harvard University, Wanzenberg began his architectural career in 1978 at I. M. Pei & Partners in New York. During the 1980s and 1990s, he maintained a professional and personal partnership with interior designer Jed Johnson, collaborating on residential and commercial projects. Wanzenberg established an independent practice and designed several luxury residential developments in Manhattan, including 515 Park Avenue, The Hubert, Chelsea Enclave, and 150 Charles Street. His memoir, Journey: The Life and Times of an American Architect, was published in 2013.

== Life and career ==
=== Early life and education ===
Alan Wanzenberg was born in Evanston, Illinois, the third son of Henry and Doris Wanzenberg. His mother was a homemaker, an avid athlete, and an amateur pianist, while his father worked as a mechanical contractor and civil engineer.

As a child, he would admire the architecture of the neighborhood, which included a number of residences designed by Frank Lloyd Wright. He also spent hours in the Thorne Miniature Rooms at the Art Institute of Chicago. His family spent their summers in Castle Park, Michigan, where he acquired a further appreciation for craftsmanship and traditional shapes from the 19th-century rental cottages at the lakeside resort.

Wanzenberg was classmates with comedian Ruby Wax at Evanston Township High School. He intended to earn a degree in nautical engineering at the University of California, Berkeley. However, he ultimately changed his major and received a bachelor's degree in architecture in 1973. He continued his education at the Harvard Graduate School of Design, where he graduated with a master's degree in 1978. For the following three years, he worked at I.M. Pei's New York headquarters.

=== Design partnership with Jed Johnson ===
In 1980, Wanzenberg met interior decorator Jed Johnson, Pop artist Andy Warhol's longtime partner, through their mutual friend, art dealer Thomas Ammann. They became friends and professional collaborators before beginning an affair several months later. "Initially I didn't pay much attention to him because he was quiet," recalled Wanzenberg. While working on Peter Brant and Sandy Brant's home in Palm Beach, Wanzenberg accompanied Johnson and Warhol to the opening of Warhol's exhibition at the Lowe Art Museum in September 1980. He spent Christmas with Johnson in Vail, Colorado that December.

By 1981, both men had left their respective partners, and they moved into a duplex apartment at 15 West 67th Street on Manhattan's Upper West Side. Following the death of one of Wanzenberg's brothers in a plane accident about eighteen months into their relationship, Wanzenberg said the loss brought him closer to Johnson. In 1982, they established a design firm from their home. Although they later formed separate companies, Alan Wanzenberg Architect P.C. and Jed Johnson Associates, they continued to collaborate on most projects and shared offices.

Fred Hughes, Warhol's business manager, helped secure several early commissions for the pair, including work for Christiane Schlumberger and Katie Jones, nieces of art collector Dominique de Menil, as well as projects for musician Mick Jagger and model Jerry Hall.

In 1988, Johnson described their working relationship to Progressive Architecture by saying, "We do not have ego problems." Their projects included the renovation of the Sperone Westwater Gallery in 1988 and the headquarters of Interview magazine in 1989. They also designed restaurants, including Cafe Spiga at 1022 Third Avenue, which opened in February 1989, and Punsch at 11 West 60th Street, which opened in January 1990. In 1991, they participated in Metropolitan Home magazine's ShowHouse benefit for the Design Industries Foundation for AIDS (DIFFA) in New York City. In 1994, Wanzenberg designed a residence on Manhattan's Lower East Side for Housing Works.

Wanzenberg and Johnson also shared a dachshund, Gus, and a two-home property in Fire Island's Water Island community that had previously belonged to fashion designer Perry Ellis. In 1995, they served as honorary chairmen of the Katonah Museum of Art's gala dinner dance at Purchase College in Purchase, New York.

In July 1996, Johnson was killed in the explosion of TWA Flight 800 shortly after its departure from John F. Kennedy International Airport. His twin brother, Jay Johnson, subsequently became president of Jed Johnson Associates and inherited Johnson's collection of Warhol paintings.

In October 1996, Wanzenberg became involved in a dispute with Elle Decor editor Marian McEvoy after he allowed Architectural Digest access to the guest cottages he and Johnson designed at Twin Farms, a resort in Vermont, for an article published shortly before an eight-page feature on the property was scheduled to appear in Elle Decor. McEvoy criticized Wanzenberg for failing to alert the magazine to the potential conflict.

=== Later career ===
Wanzenberg continued to live and work out of the duplex he shared with Johnson, which was featured in the September 1998 issue of Architectural Digest. Reflecting on the home and Johnson's death Wanzenberg said: "A lot of the collecting I've done and the modifications I've made are the product of a dialogue I feel I've had with him … At times it makes me sad, at times it's been stimulating, at times it's been exhilarating." He sold the duplex and much of its contents for more than $4.3 million in 2012 and moved to a two-bedroom apartment on West 60th Street.

In 1999, Wanzenberg reorganized his practice as Alan Wanzenberg Design LLC. He developed a clientele among Goldman Sachs partners, including Dan Neidich, who involved him in the planning of 515 Park Avenue, where Wanzenberg designed the apartment layouts. He has also conceived designs for the several New York luxury condominium projects, including The Hubert (2003), Chelsea Enclave (2011), and 150 Charles Street (2018).

Wanzenberg served as president of the board of the Skowhegan School of Painting & Sculpture and designed the organization's New York City branch in 2014.

His memoir, Journey: The Life and Times of an American Architect, was published by Pointed Leaf Press in 2013.

=== Relationship with Peter Kelly and later life ===
Wanzenberg met landscape architect Peter Kelly in 2003 during Gay Ski Week in Aspen, Colorado. In 2014, Wanzenberg described Kelly as his "compass for the last decade," adding that " he's like Jed in his values and his work ethic. Wisely, he never tried to challenge Jed's influence on my life."

Wanzenberg and Kelly divide their time between a house Wanzenberg built in Ancram, New York, and a vacation home in Nosara, Costa Rica. They purchased Casa de Mañana, a 1970s bungalow on the Nicoya Peninsula, renovated it, and furnished it with pieces made from local timbers. Their Costa Rican home was featured in WSJ Magazine in 2019, while their Upstate New York home appeared in William Abranowicz's Country Life: Homes of the Catskill Mountains and Hudson Valley (2023).

Wanzenberg is also involved with Opus 40, an environmental sculpture park in Saugerties, New York.

In 2022, he appeared in the Netflix docuseries The Andy Warhol Diaries.

== Awards and recognition ==
Wanzenberg has been named to Architectural Digest's AD100 list of leading architects and designers multiple times. He has also been included on Elle Decor's A-List on several occasions.

In 2018, Wanzenberg's design for the luxury condominium at 150 Charles Street received an AIA Housing Award from the American Institute of Architects.

== Books ==
- Wanzenberg, Alan (2013). Journey: The Life and Times of an American Architect. Pointed Leaf Press. ISBN 978-1-938461-09-5.
