= Obadiah Sypher =

American furniture maker (1833–1907)

- Born: October 10, 1833; Flushing, New York, U.S.
- Died: August 18, 1907 (aged 73); East Orange, New Jersey, U.S.
- Occupation: Businessman
- Spouse: Elizabeth Cynthia Thayer (m. 1867)
- Children: 1

Obadiah Lum Sypher (October 10, 1833 – August 18, 1907) was an American businessman and furniture maker. Originally a furniture store clerk in Manhattan, he bought out his employer, which later became Sypher & Co., and presided over the firm's growth in profitability and clientele.

== Biography ==
Sypher was born on October 10, 1833, in Flushing prior to its consolidation with New York City. He was the oldest of nine children born to Abigail Ann (née Lum) and Abraham Sypher. His family moved to the breadbasket region of Orange County, New York, namely Blooming Grove.

Although he joined his father in working as a miller, he returned to the New York City area by the 1860s after the local wheat industry lost revenue to a growing competition from the American West. By 1863, he was working as a clerk at a furniture store located on 557 Broadway, Manhattan, owned by England immigrant Daniel Marley. (Note: E. J. Sypher writes that while an exact answer is not known, the older Sypher may have been connected to Marley through a family connection or Clarence Cook (who lived near the family in Newburgh).) In 1866, he bought his employer, which he renamed Sypher & Co. (Note: E. J. Sypher cites several possible ways he was able to invest in this decision, including a syndicate of investors and to (a lesser extent) family connections.) He later hired his younger brother Asa, and the business started growing in the coming years. In 1884, Sypher's company moved to the newly-built 860 Broadway.

Sypher's company sold antiques, including furniture, art, and jewelry, and even offered prices as high as $175,000. Sypher's company imported antiques from Europe and Asia, becoming one of the most prominent in that field at the time, and the brother partners visited the former continent to purchase from the collections of Anatoly Demidov, 1st Prince of San Donato and William Douglas-Hamilton, 12th Duke of Hamilton. Additionally, he would destroy counterfeit furniture sold to his firm by smashing them on a sidewalk with an ax. Sypher also specialized in decorative textiles, with demand jumping due to the Second Industrial Revolution.

In addition to the main store in Manhattan, Sypher presided over the opening of branches in and Chicago and Newport, Rhode Island, as well as showrooms and a furniture factory. His customers included U.S. president Ulysses S. Grant; billionaires John D. Rockefeller, Cornelius Vanderbilt, Frederick William Vanderbilt, and art patrons John and Isabella Stewart Gardner; and Sypher was reportedly "personally acquainted with nearly every prominent New Yorker in the period from about 1880 to 1907." In 1893, he served as an organizer for an industrial arts exhibition at Madison Square Garden.

According to E. J. Sypher, Sypher's company was part of the aestheticism trend, and Sypher himself "may be said to have had lasting influence on the appreciation of the decorative arts in the United States". One of his employees, Harriet Hubbard Ayer, later went on to become an independent saleswoman. In addition to other private collections, works sold or made by Sypher's firm have survived in the Cathedral of St. John the Divine, Metropolitan Museum of Art, Museum of the City of New York, Isabella Stewart Gardner Museum, Preservation Society of Newport County, and Rhode Island School of Design Museum.

Sypher married Elizabeth Cynthia Thayer on June 5, 1867; the couple had one child, Bessie (born 1868).

Despite its initial success, Sypher's company went down under amidst 1890s recessions, and significantly downsized after paying off debts reaching $83,404 and selling off large parts of its inventory in two major auctions. He also personally faced legal action on charges of evading custom duties and defaulting on loans. Sypher died on August 18, 1907, at his home in East Orange, New Jersey following a period of heart disease; he was 73. The firm effectively dissolved with the deaths of both Sypher brothers, with W. & J. Sloane employees Mitchell Samuels and Percy W. French taking over and renaming it to P. W. French & Company. His brother Asa's great-grandson F. J. Sypher wrote a history of Sypher's firm.
