= Peter Marino =

American architect (born 1949)

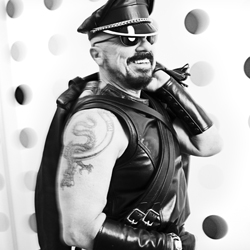
- Marino in July 2012
- Born: August 9, 1949 (age 77); New York City, U.S.
- Education: Cornell University College of Architecture, Art, and Planning
- Occupation: Architect
- Spouse: Jane Trapnell (m. 1983)
- Children: 1
- Practice: Peter Marino Architect
- Website: petermarinoarchitect.com

Peter Marino (born August 9, 1949) is an American architect. He is a Fellow of the American Institute of Architects (FAIA). He founded Peter Marino Architect PLLC in 1978 and has designed boutiques, flagships, residences, hotels, and cultural spaces for major international fashion and luxury brands, including Chanel, Dior, Louis Vuitton, and Bulgari. Marino began his career designing residences for figures in the art and cultural worlds, including his mentor and early patron Pop artist Andy Warhol.

Marino is also an art collector and the founder of the Peter Marino Art Foundation in Southampton, New York, which opened in 2021 and exhibits works from his collection alongside rotating exhibitions and site-specific commissions. His architectural work is characterized by the integration of contemporary art, sculpture, and custom design into both commercial and residential spaces.

== Early life and education ==
Marino was born and raised in Queens, New York. He played the piano until the age of 14. He began drawing as a child and took special art classes. He received a gold medal from Mayor Lindsey for a painting he made in 1966.

Marino graduated at the age of 16 from Francis Lewis High School in Fresh Meadows, Queens. He earned a degree from the Cornell University College of Architecture, Art, and Planning in 1971.

== Career ==
=== Early career ===
After graduation, Marino apprenticed at the New York offices of Skidmore, Owings & Merrill, George Nelson, and I.M. Pei.

In the 1970s, Marino met Pop artist Andy Warhol through Pat Hackett, who was Warhol's collaborator and confidante. His first major independent commission was the renovation of Warhol's manager Fred Hughes's brownstone at 1342 Lexington Avenue, which had previously been occupied by Warhol. Marino later said that this project was important to his career because Hughes frequently entertained guests at his home, giving them an opportunity to see Marino's work firsthand.

Warhol's live-in boyfriend, interior designer Jed Johnson, asked Marino to renovate the bathrooms and kitchen of their townhouse at 57 East 66th Street. Marino prepared the architectural drawings while Johnson handled the interior decoration. Marino described the project as a "fantastic experience, I was a young architect and creating home designs in Andy's city was really exciting." Johnson subsequently approached Marino to collaborate on the renovation of Warhol's Factory at 860 Broadway, which also housed the offices of Interview magazine. Through Warhol's circle, Marino was introduced to prominent families, including the Rothschilds and Agnellis, as well as figures in the fashion world such as Valentino, Pierre Bergé, and Yves Saint Laurent, for whom he later designed residences.

In 1978, Marino founded his architectural firm. The firm is based in New York City with 160 employees, and offices in Philadelphia and Southampton.

=== Notable projects ===
Pierre Bergé residence, New York City (1978)

In 1978, Marino designed the pied-à-terre of French businessman Pierre Bergé at The Pierre hotel in New York City. Bergé had initially hired Marino to design the entire apartment, but Johnson persuaded him to pursue an American-inspired interior and introduced him to Judith Hollander, a friend and collector with an interest in American Empire furniture. Johnson and Hollander oversaw the apartment's interior decoration, incorporating American antiques, stenciled walls, and other period-inspired details, while Marino was responsible for the interior architecture and cabinetry. The apartment was featured in a spread in the May 1979 issue of Vogue.

Gianni and Marella Agnelli residence, New York City (1981)

In 1981, Italian industrialist Gianni Agnelli and his wife, Marella Agnelli moved from their apartment at 720 Park Avenue to a larger pied-à-terre at 770 Park Avenue, where Marella enlisted architect Renzo Mongiardino and Marino to oversee the design. Mongiardino, who had previously designed residences for the couple in Turin and St. Moritz, designed the living and dining rooms, hall, and library, while Marino served as the on-site architect and designed the private rooms, kitchen, and breakfast room.

Barneys New York, New York City (1985)

In 1985, the Pressman family, who owned Barneys New York at the time, hired Marino to design the women's retail concept for the department store. This was Marino's first retail project, which led to his designing 17 freestanding Barneys department stores in the U.S. and Japan between 1986 and 1993. Marino's work for Barneys put him in contact with other fashion designers for whom he went on to design boutiques, such as Calvin Klein, Donna Karan, Giorgio Armani, Ermenegildo Zegna and Fendi, and eventually Chanel, Dior and Louis Vuitton.

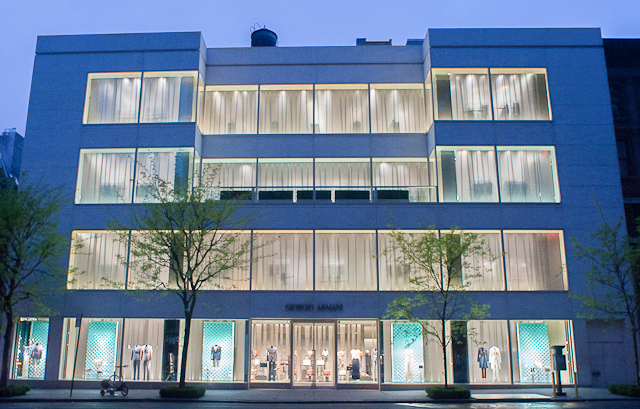
Armani, Madison Avenue, New York City

Giorgio Armani New York, New York City (1996)

In 1996, Marino designed a freestanding boutique on New York City's Madison Avenue for Giorgio Armani. In 2004, The New York Times reported that Marino is "widely credited with proving the theory that architectural design can be a strong component of a shopper's identification with a brand", citing the freestanding Giorgio Armani flagship Marino designed in 1996 on Madison Avenue as the embodiment of Armani's "trademark minimalism."

Chanel Ginza Tower, Tokyo (2004)

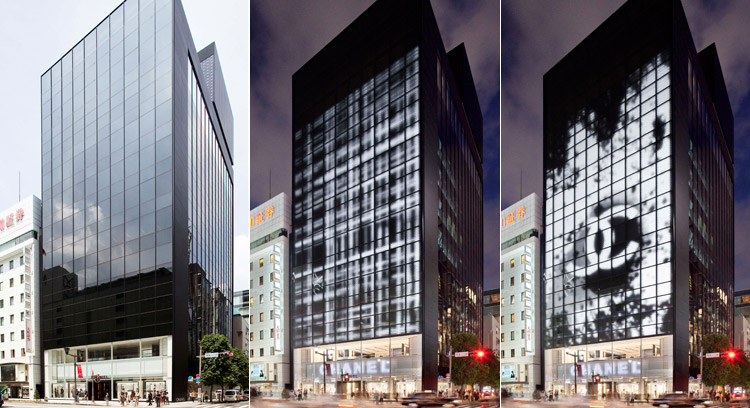
Chanel, Ginza, Tokyo

The New York Times referenced Marino's work on the 2004 Chanel tower in Japan's Ginza district, "that takes Coco Chanel's signature black and white tweed and explodes it into three dimensions." The 56-meter high building incorporated a curtain wall of glass encapsulating a nest-shaped block of aluminum in Chanel handbags’ signature tweed pattern. Notable features included a first of its kind interactive glass façade with 700,000 embedded light-emitting diodes, and a system of 1,120 square meters of canvas roll blinds and state-changing electronic privacy glass which allowed office workers to see out during the day, while providing a black background for the display at night.

170 East End Avenue, New York City (2007)

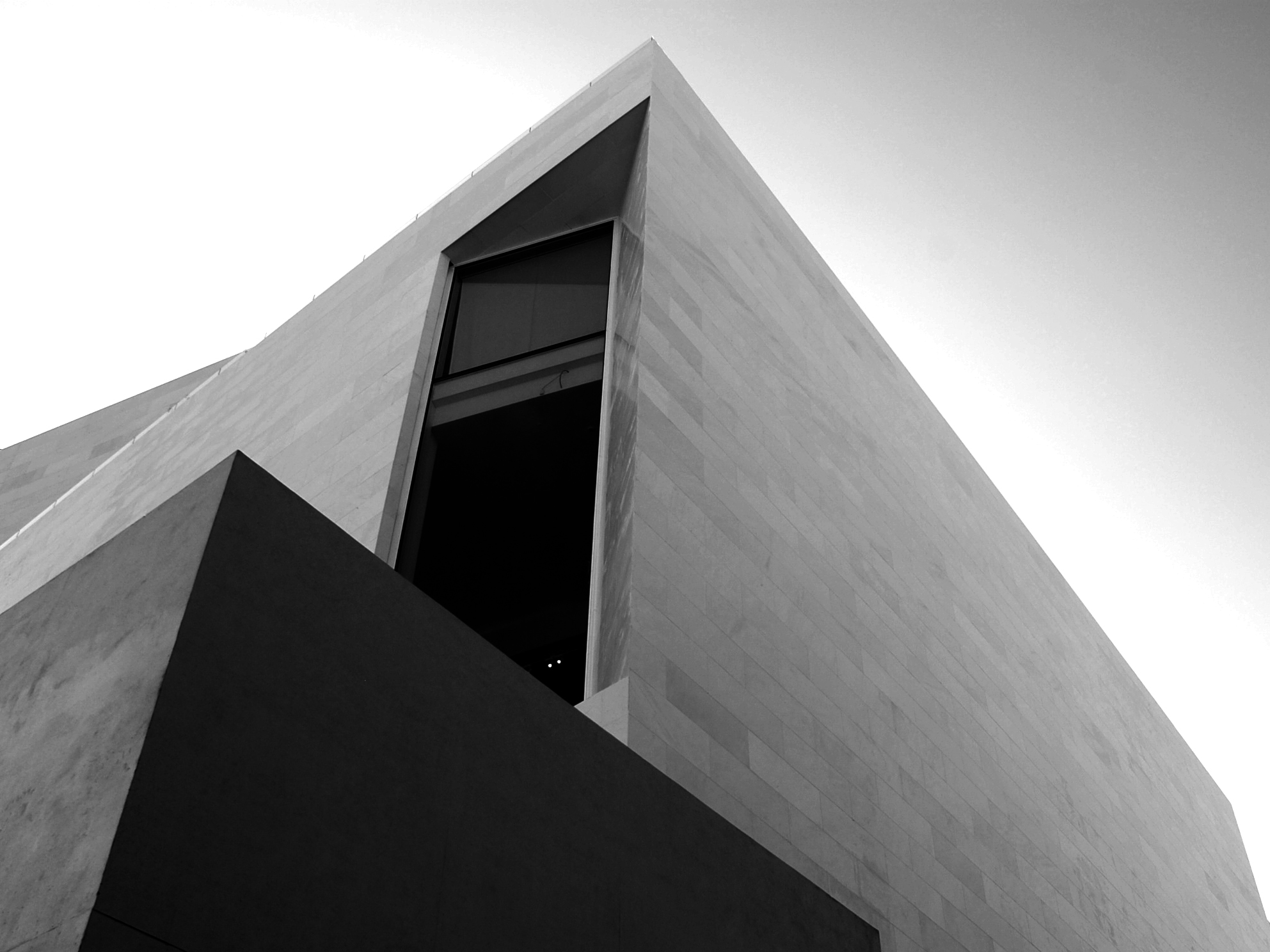
Boontheshop, Seoul

In 2007, Marino's first luxury condominium high rise project opened at 170 East End Avenue in New York City. The building has an expansive marble lobby, leading out to a garden and waterfall in the back.

Boontheshop, Seoul (2014)

In October 2014, Marino designed the flagship store in Seoul, Korea's Cheongdam-dong neighborhood for Boontheshop, a retail brand owned by Shinsegae, a South Korean luxury product specialist. The 55,000 square foot project consists of two angular buildings clad in white marble, connected by glass bridges. It was Marino's first multi-brand store since the Barney's project.

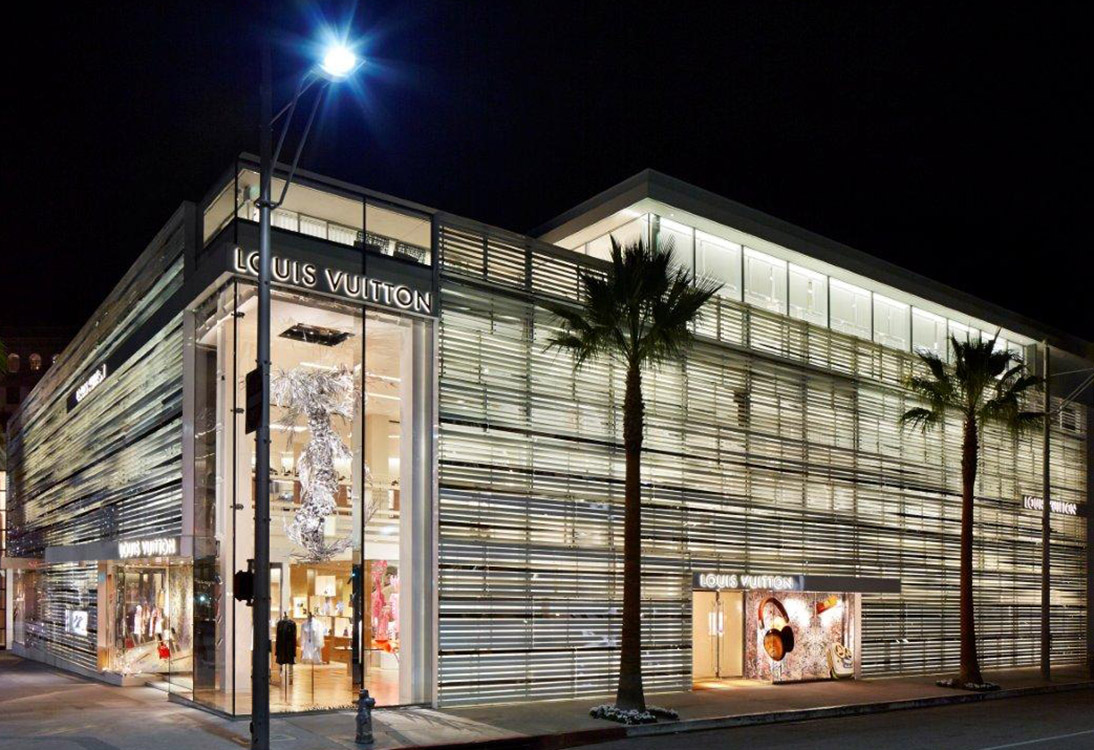
Louis Vuitton, Rodeo Drive, Beverly Hills

Louis Vuitton, Rodeo Drive, Los Angeles (2015)

In January 2015, Marino completed the flagship Louis Vuitton shop on Rodeo Drive, in Beverly Hills, California. The design included a three-layer facade consisting of louver-like stainless steel ribbons over glass over squares of white fabric, which LA Times' fashion reporter Adam Tschorn described as being designed to create an indoor/outdoor feeling.

Hublot 5th Avenue, New York City (2016)

Marino designed both the building and interiors of luxury Swiss watch brand Hublot’s flagship store in New York on Fifth Avenue between 57th and 58th streets. The tall and slender 1500-square-foot building’s design is inspired by the high-end timepieces sold in the store. The facade consists of hundreds of powder-coated black aluminum panels, positioned at various angles, some lined with LED strips. "The sculptural movement inherent in the facade is an abstract notion of time and the perpetual mechanism of the watch," said Marino.

Chanel Badgat Street, Istanbul (2018)

Completed in 2018, the 8,800-squarefoot building for Chanel in Istanbul, Turkey, includes offices and a rooftop terrace and is "set back behind an entry plaza of gray marble pavers with a black granite reflecting pool." Notable features include the angled white marble façade — which Interior Design calls the "architectural equivalent of Coco Chanel’s white pleated blouses" — and the mirrored stairwell, Marino’s homage to the original Chanel headquarters.

Getty Residences, Lehman Maupin Gallery, Hill Art Foundation, New York City (2018)

In 2018, Marino completed the Getty Building, a residential building in New York’s Chelsea neighborhood. The Hill Art Foundation occupies the third and fourth floors of the building, with an entrance located at 239 Tenth Avenue.

Chanel Ginza Namiki, Tokyo (2018)

Also in 2018, Marino completed a slender 9-story tower for Chanel in Tokyo. Mukai designed an art installation for the façade for the building's opening. The building includes a spa and offices, in addition to retail.

Cheval Blanc Paris (2021)

Constructed during the COVID-19 pandemic with its opening delayed until Fall of 2021, Cheval Blanc Paris, adjacent to the iconic ‘La Samaritaine’ department store in Paris put Marino in charge of conceiving 9 floors which includes 72 rooms and suites, lobbies, four restaurants (Le Tout Paris, Plentitude, Langosterie, Limbar), and the luxurious Dior Spa with the longest indoor pool in Europe. "Our intention was to transform the iconic Parisian building without disregarding its existing design heritage", Marino commented.

Dior, 30 Ave Montaigne, Paris (2022)

Marino designed the renovation of the Dior flagship store in Paris. Nicolas Milon of Architectural Digest noted,

Marino pays tribute to the history of the House of Dior, he does so by anchoring it in the present. The contrast between heritage and modernity is expressed throughout the nearly 108,000-square-foot complex, thanks to the combination of more than a hundred different materials, from stone to precious fabrics in a gradation of whites.

== Personal life ==
Marino is married to costume designer Jane Trapnell; the couple have a daughter.

Marino is also notable for his personal fashion style, which he has called a "tattooed biker look", but just as a "decoy". It features mostly black clothing, leather with buckles and studs, and a leather cap.

Marino is an avid collector. He began collecting in the 1970s, initially purchasing French ceramics and decorative objects at flea markets in New York and Paris. He describes his approach as collecting "high and low." At age 22, he made his first major art purchase, acquiring two works by Lucas Samaras. His collection has since grown to more than 1,200 objects, including French porcelain, contemporary and modern art, and French and Italian bronzes dating from the mid-16th to the mid-18th century. In 2010, his collection of bronzes was exhibited at the Wallace Collection in London.

=== Harassment allegations ===
Marino has been at the center of two lawsuits in which he was accused of sexual harassment and racial discrimination by former employees. In December 2015 Marino was sued by Deirdre O'Brien, his former office manager, for allegedly making racist and sexist comments. In May 2016, Jonathan Michaud, a former textile specialist at the firm, filed a lawsuit in New York State Court, accusing Marino of sexually harassing him and making homophobic slurs.

In March 2018 the American Institute of Architects New York (AIANY) announced that it was rescinding Marino's 2018 Design Awards citing the harassment allegations. According to Curbed, citing a spokesperson for Peter Marino Architect (PMA), the sexual harassment suit was resolved, while a countersuit was filed against the other claimant.

== Peter Marino Art Foundation ==
Housed in a 19th-century Queen Anne-style building in Southampton, Long Island, the Peter Marino Art Foundation (PMAF) is an 8,000-square-foot exhibition space showcasing approximately 200 works from Marino's collection. The building was formerly home to the Rogers Memorial Library and later the Parrish Art Museum. Marino purchased the 1895 building, designed by R. H. Robertson, in 2018 and spent three years restoring its historic façade and transforming its interior. He also redesigned the gardens and restored the grounds. The Foundation opened to the public in June 2021. That year, PMAF and Marino received Designboom's Design Prize 2021 for "Best Exhibition."

Marino's private art collection, assembled over more than 40 years, is displayed at PMAF and ranges from Egyptian, Greek, and Roman antiquities to Baroque bronzes, works by Eugène Delacroix, Andy Warhol and Jean-Michel Basquiat, and sculptures by Les Lalanne, as well as 19th-century faience, and photographs by Robert Mapplethorpe. The Foundation presents rotating exhibitions that change seasonally, featuring artists including Vik Muniz, Anselm Kiefer, Melvin Edwards, Sanford Biggers, Jean-Michel Othoniel, and Johan Creten, as well as photographs by Diane Arbus and Priscilla Rattazzi. The exhibitions are accompanied by talks and book signings. Site-specific commissions by artists Peter Dayton and Richard Woods cover the sides of the Foundation's elevator and staircase. Marino also collects contemporary design, including works by Ingrid Donat.

Marino has said that he has long admired house museums such as the Morgan Library & Museum and the Frick Collection, which influenced his decision to display his collection in a space designed to feel lived-in. He has described the Foundation as "a Frick by the sea, if I may say so."

Writer Bob Colacello, who has been Marino's friend since they were both regulars at Andy Warhol's Factory in the 1970s, serves as associate director of the Foundation alongside Marino's daughter, Isabelle Trapnell Marino.

== Awards and recognition ==
In 2012, Marino was awarded the Officier of the Ordre des Arts et des Lettres. from the French Ministry of Culture in recognition of his significant contributions to the arts in France.
