= Frederick W. Hughes =

American businessman (1943–2001)

Fred Hughes
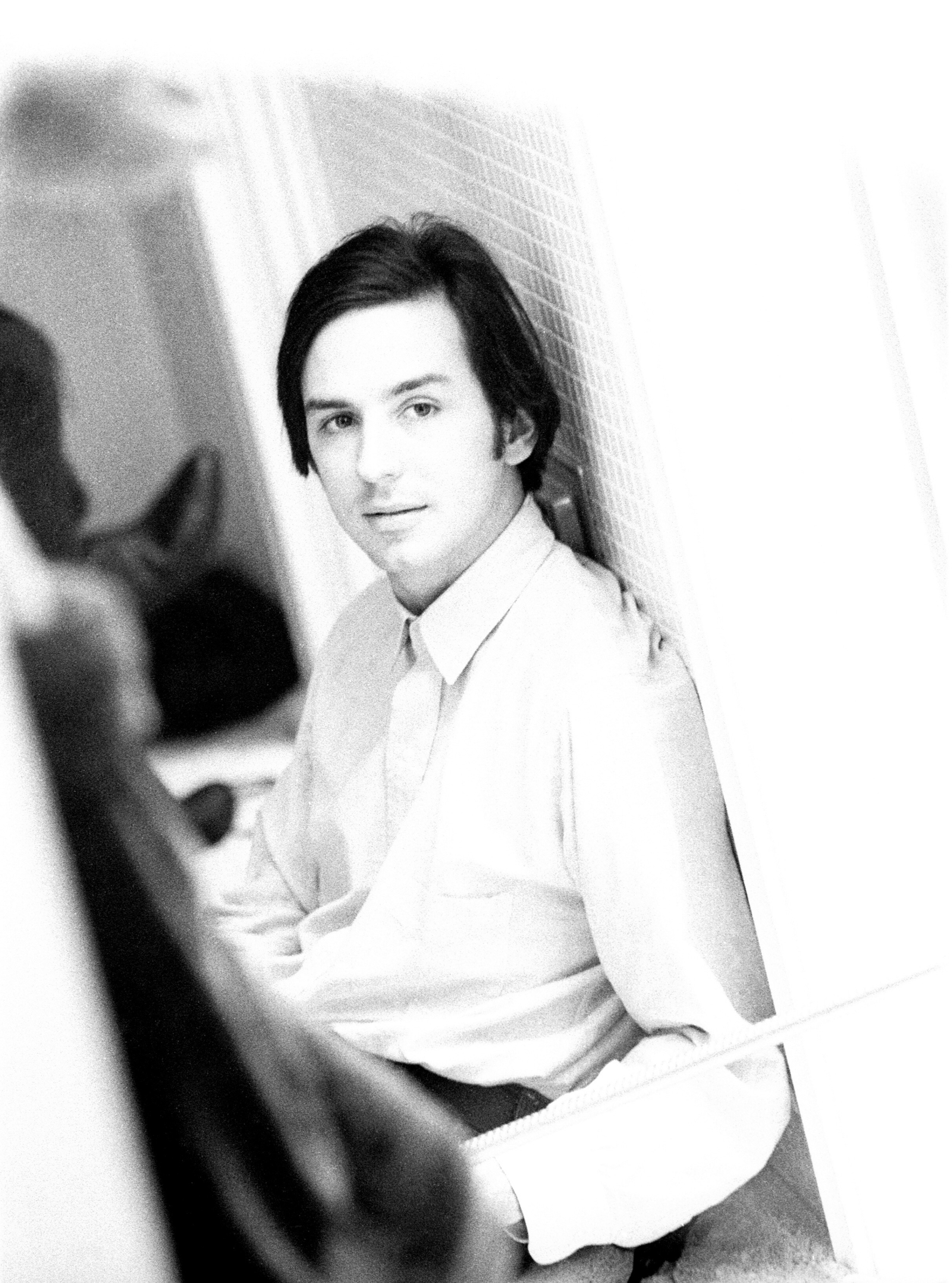
- Hughes by Billy Name
- Born: Frederick Wilson Hughes; July 29, 1943; Dallas, Texas, U.S.
- Died: January 14, 2001 (aged 57); New York City, New York, U.S.
- Education: University of St. Thomas
- Occupation: Businessman
- Spouse: Marina Schiano (1973–1975)

Frederick W. Hughes (July 29, 1943 – January 14, 2001), known as Fred Hughes, was an American businessman and collector. Best known as the longtime business manager of Pop artist Andy Warhol, Hughes played a key role in managing Warhol's finances, cultivating elite patrons, and professionalizing Warhol's commercial operations in the United States and Europe. He later served as publisher of Interview magazine and, following Warhol's death in 1987, was appointed executor of the artist's estate and founding chairman of the Andy Warhol Foundation for the Visual Arts, a position from which he was removed in 1992 after internal disputes with the foundation's president, Archibald L. Gillies, whom Hughes had appointed. He suffered from multiple sclerosis in his later years and died in 2001.

== Early life and education ==
Frederick Wilson Hughes was born in Dallas, Texas on July 29, 1943. His father, Frederick William Hughes, an Army Air Corps officer, flew bombing missions over North Africa and Italy during World War II, earning the Distinguished Flying Cross, the Silver Star, and several presidential citations. After the war, when Hughes was four, the family moved to Houston, Texas, his mother Jennie Wilson Hughes' hometown, and purchased a modest one-story, three-bedroom house in the Hyde Park neighborhood near River Oaks. His father worked as "a manufacturer's representative for several furniture companies, including Chromcraft."

Hughes, the eldest of three children, began taking art classes at the Museum of Fine Arts, Houston, at the age of seven. He attended the Woodrow Wilson Elementary School. and St. Thomas High School in Houston, where he made the honor roll in his sophomore year. He studied art history at the University of St. Thomas in Houston, but he did not graduate because he failed the required theology course.

While at the university, Hughes was mentored by businessman John de Menil and his wife Dominique de Menil, heirs to the Schlumberger oil fortune and major arts patrons who supported the art history department at St. Thomas. Through the de Menils, Hughes accompanied them on art-buying trips to New York and Europe, experiences that helped shape his connoisseurship. They later assisted him in securing his first professional position at the Alexander Iolas Gallery in Paris.

== Management of Andy Warhol's career ==
In 1967, Hughes met Pop artist Andy Warhol at a benefit for Merce Cunningham at Philip Johnson's Glass House in New Canaan, Connecticut. Recalling the meeting in The New Yorker, Hughes said, "I never questioned whether we'd get along or not. For one thing, he knew who I was, and he saw the pot of gold at the end of the rainbow, just like I did." He soon became Warhol's business manager and later served as the publisher of Warhol's Interview magazine.

Filmmaker Paul Morrissey believed Warhol valued Hughes for his reliability and for acting as a private manager and dealer at a lower commission than established galleries, noting that Hughes "came to the office every day" and took "10 or 20 percent… instead of the 50 percent Andy was giving Leo Castelli." Hughes further impressed Warhol by securing $20,000 in financing from John and Dominique de Menil for Sunset (1967).

Hughes later described his de Menil connection as his "dowry" and helped introduce Warhol's work to their children, while persuading Dominique de Menil to commission silkscreen portraits in 1968. These commissions launched Warhol's portrait business, which became a major source of income for ventures such as Interview magazine. Hughes went on to arrange portrait sittings with Eric de Rothschild, Gianni and Marella Agnelli, Hélène Rochas, São Schlumberger, Baroness de Waldner, and Yves Saint Laurent. He also expanded Warhol's European market by cultivating dealers such as Bruno Bischofberger, who became a leading promoter of Warhol’s work in Switzerland and Germany.

Hughes was present at the Factory on June 3, 1968, when radical feminist Valerie Solanas shot Warhol. As Solanas briefly contemplated shooting Hughes, she was distracted by the sound of an elevator and left the building. Hughes and Factory assistant Jed Johnson were later questioned by police as eyewitnesses.

In February 1971, during a tour of Germany, Hughes took Polaroid photographs of Warhol and his entourage and sent them to the Photographers' Gallery in London, where they were sold for $12 each.

=== The Andy Warhol Foundation ===
Following Warhol's death in February 1987, Hughes was bequeathed $250,000 and appointed executor of Warhol's estate. That same year, he founded the Andy Warhol Foundation for the Visual Arts and initially served as its president. Hughes was the driving force behind the widely publicized 10-day Sotheby's auction of Warhol's collection that accumulated $25.3 million. During this period, Hughes and Vincent Fremont, a director of the Warhol Foundation, sold works from Warhol's estate—reportedly totaling approximately $30 million between 1987 and 1989—and received commissions from the sales. Hughes, stricken with multiple sclerosis, appointed Archibald L. Gillies as the president of the foundation in February 1990. That year, the foundation's legal counsel advised that trustee sales were technically permissible under IRS rules but impractical, after which Hughes remained on the board and ceased dealing. Within a year, tensions arose between Hughes and Gillies. Hughes accused Gillies of misusing foundation funds, calling him "an enraptured philistine, a not-for-profit profiteer." In 1992, Hughes was forced out as chairman of the foundation in a boardroom coup led by Gillies. That year, Hughes was sued in a convoluted three-way legal battle with the foundation that also involved Ed Hayes, the lawyer he had hired to manage the estate.

Hughes was largely responsible for the Andy Warhol Museum opening in Pittsburgh in 1994.

== Style and public image ==
Hughes was recognized for his polished and sophisticated style. He favored suits by Everall Brothers and Anderson & Sheppard, shoes by John Lobb, and fragrance from Penhaligon's. Hughes was featured in a February 1971 Life magazine article on the revival of 1930s and 1940s fashion.

Hughes was named to the International Best Dressed List for the fist time in 1972. In 1973, he told Rosemary Kent of Women's Wear Daily, "I only own two suits—a pinstriped one and a tuxedo. That shows you what a joke it is!" Kent wrote, "Elegant and sophisticated-looking with his trademark black patent hair parted in the middle with Sta-Comb, Hughes instantly reminds one of those giddy Yalles who partied with Zelda and Scott Fitzgerald."

Hughes, who was known to wear his tuxedo jacket with blue jeans, had strong views on fashion: "My grandfather and his friends had style. His generation always looked to a leader in men's fashions and for years, it was the late Duke of Windsor. His influence was tremendous on clothing. Now there's a big confusion as to who's the leader. That's one of the reasons men look so horrible today... They're lost. I think Mick Jagger and Chairman Mao are leaders." He added, "It's my dream that Manhattan have a club where men would have to wear evening clothes or not be admitted."

Hughes was named to the International Best Dressed List again in 1976, 1986, and 1987. He was included on the International Best Dressed Hall of Fame List in 1987.

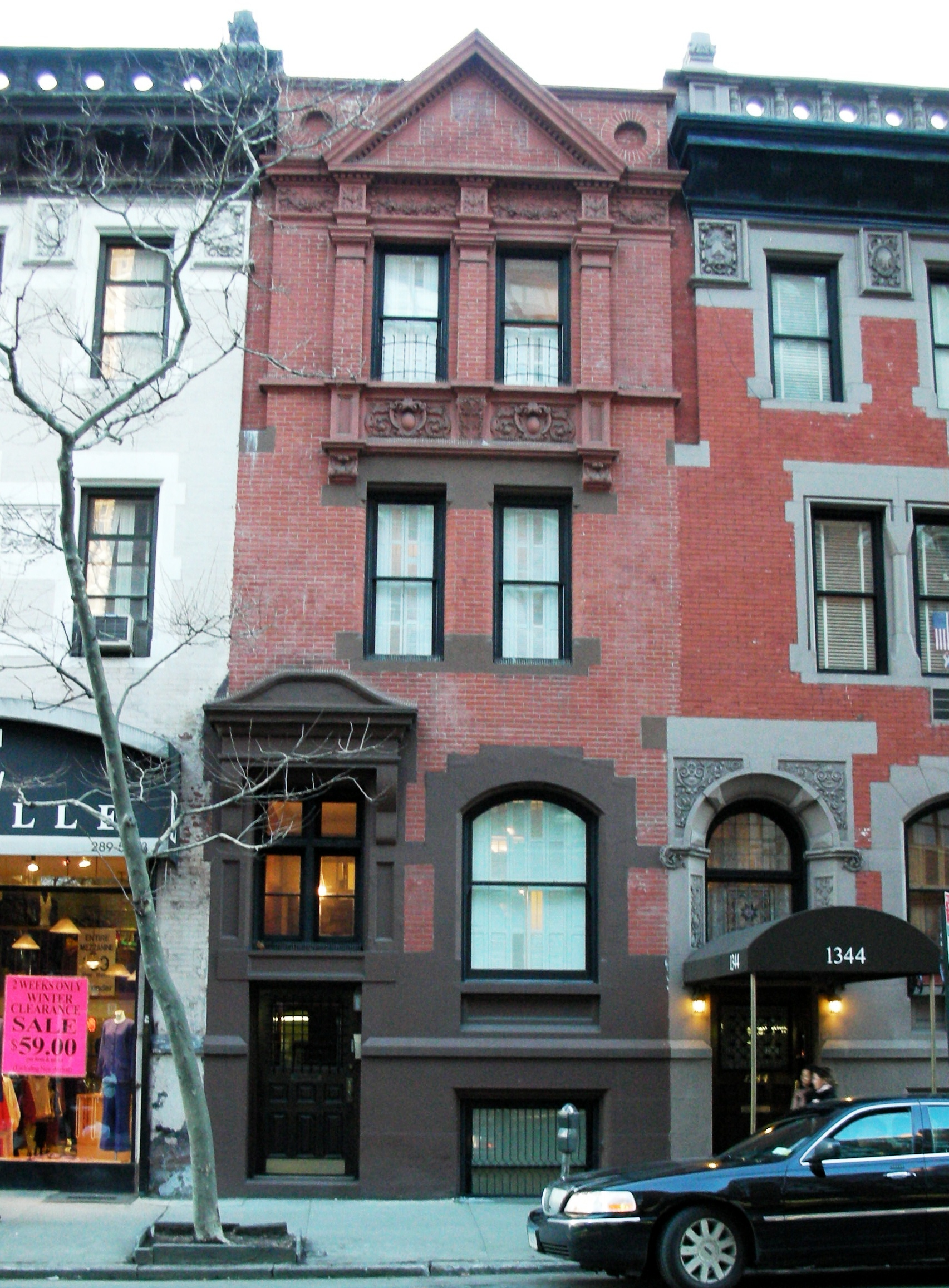
From 1974 to 2001, Hughes lived at Warhol's former home at 1342 Lexington Avenue in the Carnegie Hill neighborhood of Manhattan.

Hughes projected a respectable image in order to establish the Factory socially as well as artistically on an international level. Fashion journalist André Leon Talley, who worked for Warhol at Interview, later recalled: "Fred always wore bespoke everything, including tennis-stripe jackets and skinny jacquard silk ties. His shoes were polished. … His mannerisms, his dandyisms, his snobbism were toxic to my budget but auspicious for my aspirations."

== Personal life ==
=== Residence and collection ===
When Warhol moved to 57 East 66th Street in 1974, Hughes moved into his former residence at 1342 Lexington Avenue on the Upper East Side of Manhattan. He later purchased it from the Warhol estate for $593,500 in 1988.

Hughes was also a discerning collector with a strong appreciation for fine art and design, including Art Deco works. Talley remembered that "Fred's apartment was decorated with first-rate antiques, and he let his house become a bed-and-breakfast for all the young ladies who wanted to be part of the scene. Some would stay indefinitely. Everything was kept in a state of pitch-perfect perfection."

=== Relationships ===
Hughes was married to Italian model Marina Schiano from 1973 to 1975.

In the 1980s, Hughes dated Natasha Grenfell, the daughter of a wealthy banking family in England.

== Illness and death ==
Hughes was diagnosed with a progressive form of multiple sclerosis, a central nervous system disease with widely varying symptoms. His condition worsened rapidly in the late 1980s: during a 10-day Sotheby's auction of Warhol's collection in April 1988 he used a cane, by early 1989 he was largely dependent on it, and by November 1989 he was using a wheelchair.

Hughes died of complications from multiple sclerosis on January 14, 2001, at the age of 57. He was survived by his mother, Jennie Wilson Hughes, his sister Mary-Beth Hansard, and his brother Thomas. A memorial service was held at the Frank E. Campbell Funeral Chapel in Manhattan.
