= Marina Schiano =

Italian model, muse, stylist, journalist, photographer and jewelry designer

- Born: 18 November 1941; Naples, Italy
- Died: 8 September 2019 (aged 77); Porto Seguro, Bahia, Brazil
- Years active: 1950s – 2001
- Known for: YSL
- Spouses: Frederick W. Hughes; Marcus Vinícius Coelho

Marina Schiano (18 November 1941 – 8 September 2019) was an Italian fashion model, muse, fashion stylist, journalist, photographer and a jewelry designer.

== Early life ==
Schiano was born in Naples, Italy to parents Michele Schiano and Anna Facciolli. Her father was involved in construction and her mother had an aristocratic background. Her childhood was said to be unhappy, she was described as tall for her age, strong-willed, a deep husky voice and was described as unattractive, especially by her mother. At age 14 or 15, she left home and traveled to Milan to become a model. After the death of her father, she moved to Rome where her uncle lived and studied political science at university. Returning to Milan later, she met model Elsa Peretti.

== Career ==
Sciano arrived in New York in 1967 with her friend Elsa Peretti. There she was said to have been discovered by photographer Yasuhiro Wakabayashi. In 1968, she appeared in a twenty-eight-page feature in Vogue, photographed by Henry Clark. During her time in modelling and fashion, she worked with many photographers including Jeanloup Sieff, Clive Arrowsmith, Annie Leibovitz, Richard Avedon, John Fairchild, Herb Ritts and Grace Coddington. She appeared in many international editions of Vogue and other fashion magazines. She worked with many fashion designers including Valentino Garavani and Giancarlo Giammetti, in particular a muse to Yves Saint Laurent and François Nars. As a socialite, she became part of the New York society scene, seen regularly with Andy Warhol, Diana Vreeland and Diane von Fürstenberg.

In 1972, she was hired by fashion designer Yves Saint Laurent and his business partner Pierre Bergé to manage the YSL store in New York. Her responsibilities increased and she became YSL's Communications Director and Vice-President for North America and managed their 52 boutiques and 21 licencees. She was responsible for YSL's launch of the perfume Opium in the US in 1977. In 1980 she stepped down at YSL, formed her own public relations firm, and managed the company's image. She ended her relationship with YSL in 1982. She then joined Calvin Klein as their National and International Director of Public Relation, attempting to bring some contacts and glamour to the brand. After three years, she joined Vanity Fair as its Creative Style Director for editor Tina Brown. There she would dress Madonna, Cindy Crawford and K.D.Lang for some of the magazine's famous covers. In 1992 she was retrenched from Vanity Fair in a shake-up by editor Graydon Carter. Schiano then began her own line of over-sized jewelry consisting of semiprecious jeweled silver and gold rings, something she had indulged in before, sold in high-end stores. Around 2001, she withdrew from her New York life and friends and moved to Brazil with her husband.

== Personal life ==
From 1973 to 1975, Schiano was married to Andy Warhol's business manager Fred Hughes. The brief marriage allowed her to obtain a green card. She later married photographer Marcus Vinícius Coelho, with whom she remained married for more than forty years.

== Death ==
Schiano died in Porto Seguro, Brazil from complications following surgery for kidney cancer. She was survived by her husband, Marcus Vinícius Coelho.

== Filmography ==
- Stardust Memories (1980) as Cabaret Patron
