= 860 Broadway =

The Butler Building
- Former names: The Parish Building

General information
- Location: 860 Broadway, Manhattan, New York
- Coordinates: 40°44′14″N 73°59′24″W
- Year built: 1883-94
- Renovated: 1925

Design and construction
- Architect: Detlef Lienau

Renovating team
- Architects: F. H. Dewey & Company

860 Broadway, also known as the Butler Building and previously the Parish Building, is a commercial building in Manhattan, New York City, located at the corner of Broadway and East 17th Street, adjacent to Union Square Park. Originally completed in 1894, the building was later refaced in 1925. It has been used for office and retail spaces and is known for its association with Pop artist Andy Warhol's The Factory studio in the 1970s and 1980s. It was also the location of the Underground nightclub in the 1980s.

== History ==
=== Early history ===
Built in 1884 for the Daniel Parish estate, the Parish Building—later known as the Butler Building—stands on a site formerly occupied by the Henry Parish mansion and mid-19th-century commercial structures on land developed by the Manhattan Bank Company. From the late 19th to early 20th centuries, it accommodated notable jewelers, silversmiths, and home furnishing merchants, including Sypher & Company, Dominick & Haff and Thonet Brothers, and for several years served as the New York City showroom for Butler Brothers, dry goods and general wholesalers.

=== Andy Warhol's The Factory ===
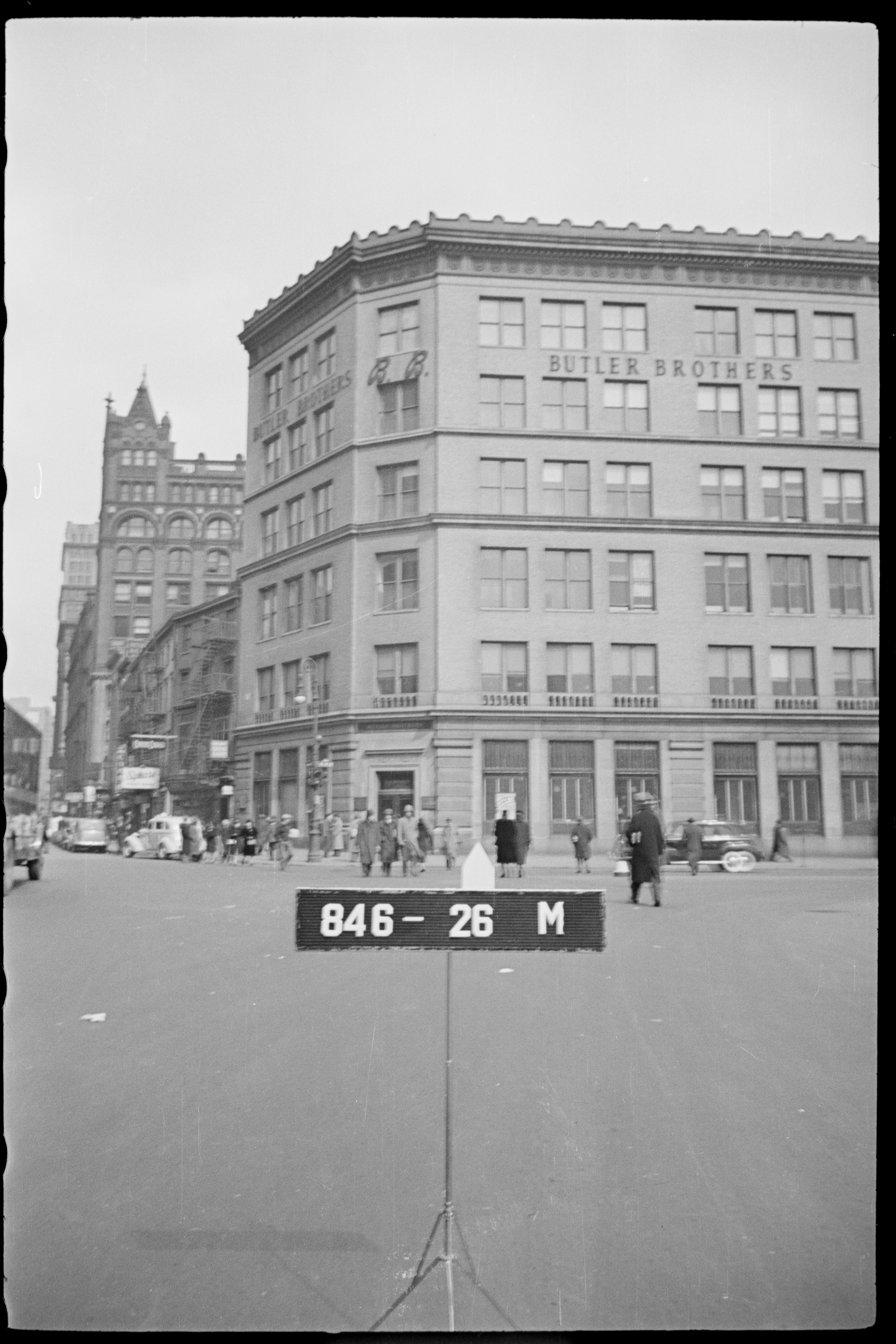
The Butler Building in a 1940 tax photo

In 1974, Pop artist Andy Warhol moved his studio, The Factory, to 860 Broadway, where he occupied the entire third floor. The renovations were overseen by his partner Jed Johnson and architect Peter Marino. The new space featured a more subdued atmosphere than his previous Factories, highlighted by large Art Deco furnishings repurposed from the Paris production of L'Amour (1972). During Warhol's tenure at 860 Broadway, the location became an influential art and cultural hub. In 1984, he moved to 22 East 33rd Street, a former Con Edison substation.

The Public Art Fund commissioned artist Rob Pruitt to design a chrome statue of Warhol that was installed outside 860 Broadway from March to October 2011.

=== The Underground nightclub ===
The Underground nightclub operated at 860 Broadway from 1980 to 1989. It was owned by Jay Levy and Maurice Brahms, a former partner of Steve Rubell and Ian Schrager, the original owners of Studio 54, after Studio 54 closed due to jailing of Rubell and Schrager. The club opened on February 28, 1980. John Blair got his start there. Baird Jones promoted Thursday, Friday, and Saturday night parties from 1983 to 1986. Music videos for "I Want To Know What Love Is" by Foreigner and "Word Up!" by Cameo were filmed at the club. After about a decade, the club was reimagined by BlackBook Magazine columnist Steve Lewis & Co. as Le Palace de Beauté, where RuPaul often performed.

=== Later tenants ===
After the Underground closed, Petco opened, moving in 2022, to 44 Union Square, the former Tammany Hall. Today, the building houses a variety of tenants, including technology, media, and service firms. Notable occupants have included software company Kaltura, architectural design firm Selldorf Architects, flexible workspace provider Industrious, and fintech firm Valon Technologies.

== Architecture ==
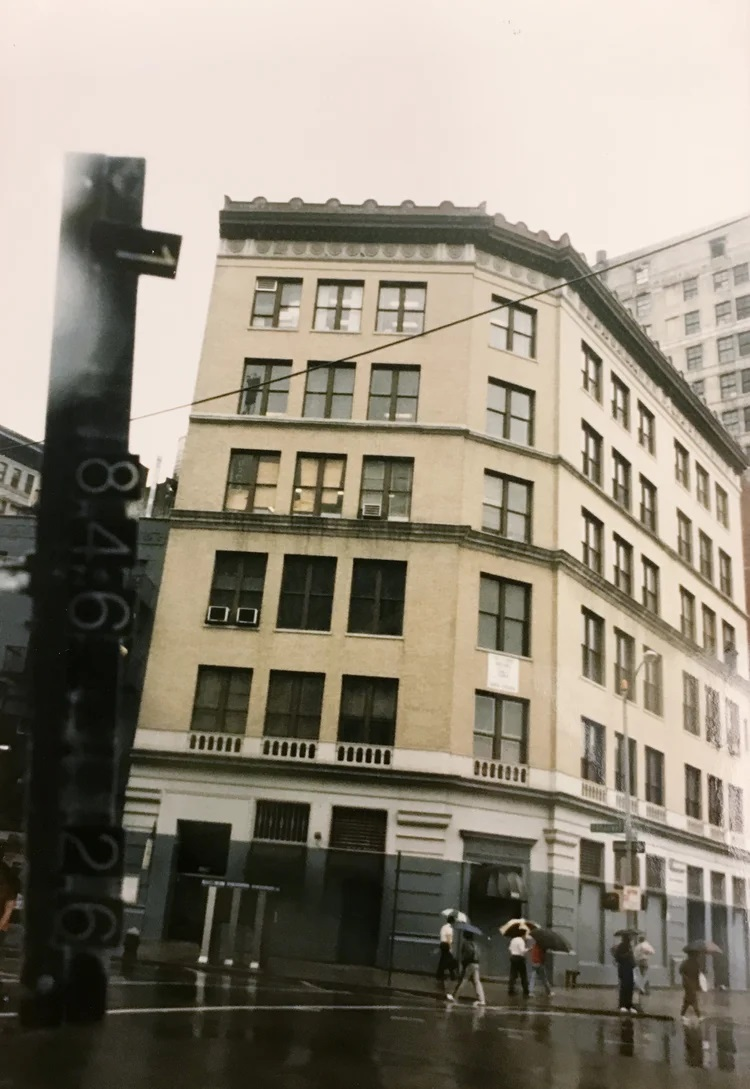
860 Broadway in a 1980s tax photo

860 Broadway is a six-story neo-Grec–style commercial building designed by architect Detlef Lienau and constructed in 1883–84 for the estate of Daniel Parish. Lienau, a student of French architect Henri Labrouste, was among the earliest proponents of the French Second Empire and neo-Grec styles in the United States. The façade of the building was altered in 1925 by F. H. Dewey & Company, which updated its exterior while losing much of its original neo-Grec character.

The structure contains approximately 75,800 square feet, with retail space occupying the ground floor and basement, and full-floor office suites above. The upper floors have large windows that offer views of Union Square Park.
