= Harriet Hubbard Ayer =

American cosmetics entrepreneur and journalist

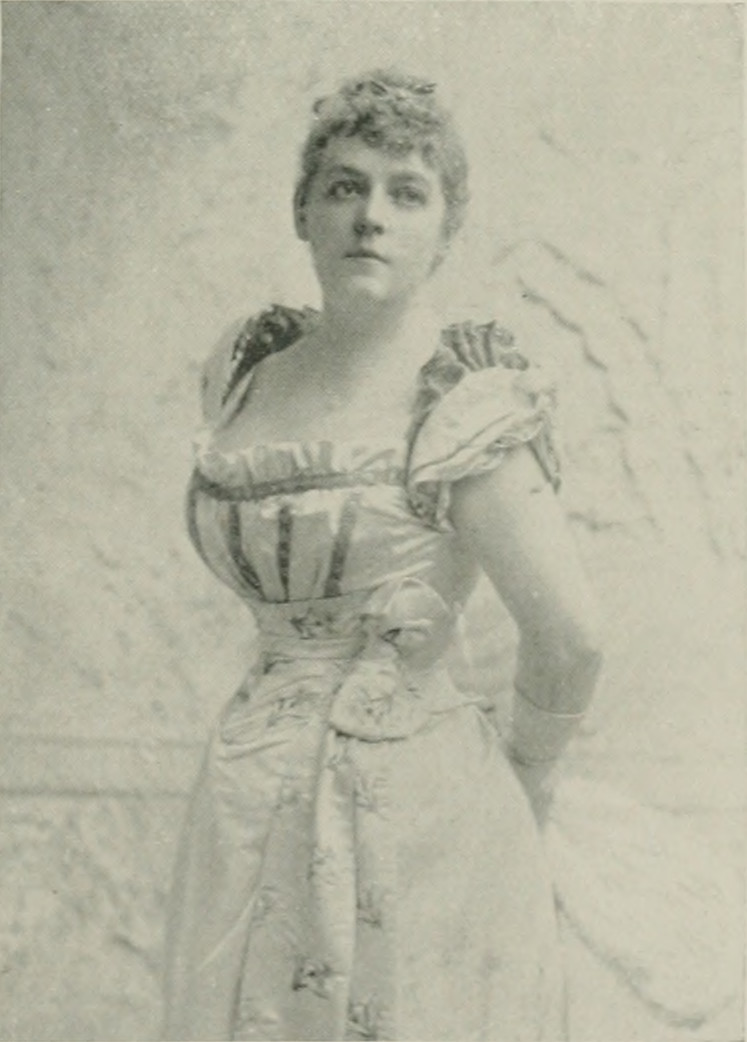
Harriet Hubbard Ayer

Harriet Hubbard Ayer (June 27, 1849, in Chicago, Illinois – November 25, 1903, in New York City) was an American cosmetics entrepreneur and journalist during the second half of the nineteenth century.

== Biography ==
Harriet Hubbard Ayer was a Chicago socialite. She became famous for having initiated the first cosmetic company in the United States and for fighting to maintain her business against male predators. She set the stage for later female cosmetic moguls.

Ayer was highly regarded as the author of articles about beauty, health, and etiquette for Joseph Pulitzer’s New York World. Her essays were compiled into a popular book in 1899 that was reissued in 1974 and more recently in an abbreviated format in 2005.

She was a proto-feminist, and her articles influenced women across the United States and abroad. While Helena Rubinstein, Elizabeth Arden, Hazel Bishop, and Estee Lauder are held in high regard as early women entrepreneurs in the cosmetics field, Harriet Hubbard Ayer was one of the first to have a successful career in the beauty industry.

== Early life ==
Harriet Hubbard Ayer was a Chicago socialite who, by necessity, turned away from her privileged world to achieve wealth and success in business at a time when most genteel women did not work. She was the daughter of Henry George Hubbard and Juliet Elvira Smith. On October 2, 1866, at the age of seventeen, she married Herbert Copeland Ayer, a man fourteen years her senior.

After separating from Herbert at the end of 1882 she took her two daughters, Hattie and Margaret, and moved to New York City. The collapse of the Ayer owned iron business Brown, Bonnell & Co. in 1883, compounded by her mother’s dwindling inheritance, rendered Harriet almost destitute. These circumstances provided the critical motivation for her resolve to support herself and her daughters in the style to which they were accustomed. In desperation Ayer accepted a job as a saleswoman and interior designer for antique furniture store, Sypher & Co.

While spending a year in Paris after the 1871 fire, she discovered a chemist in Paris who created creams and perfumes. Eventually, she bought from him the formula for a face cream that reputedly had been used by the famous French beauty Madame Recamier (1777–1849), and created her own product.

== First career ==
In 1886, she launched Recamier Toilet Preparations, Inc., which she managed and marketed by incorporating her own name on the label and writing strategic, innovative advertising copy. These actions were dually audacious, especially the use of her family name and crest on her products. People of her class were appalled at such indiscretions, but Harriet understood that it actually encouraged women who aspired to a higher social status to purchase her products. Her products included creams, balms, scents (such as Dear Heart, Mes Fleurs, and Golden Chance), brushes, soaps and more which brought in over one million dollars a year. She used much of her earnings for advertisements, paid endorsements by famous entertainers, and advertorials. Her advertising acuity led to her commercial success.

== Scandals ==
Between 1887 and 1893, at the height of her career as the head of her cosmetics company. Blanche Howard, the mistress of the finishing school in Stuttgart, Germany that Ayer's daughters attended, turned them against her. Ayer was publicly accused of scandalous behaviour in five lawsuits in 1889, which were broadcast weekly in the newspapers. During her attempt to regain control over her children, she was drugged and isolated and eventually institutionalized in 1893 by her former husband, encouraged by James M. Seymour, who plotted to take over her business.

Every period in Ayer's life revolved around a difficult relationship with a man. Her husband Herbert Copeland Ayer turned out to be an alcoholic philanderer; a later partner, General E. Burd Grubb, left her for a younger woman; and the man who funded her business, James Seymour, proved to be a swindler and a rake.

Ayer's mental symptoms, a combination of "Melancholia" and addiction to doctor prescribed morphine for headaches, exhaustion, and insomnia, led to her commitment as a ‘lunatic.’ It took fourteen months for her to escape from the Bronxville Insane Asylum. While recovering from her ordeal and to regain the respect of her daughters and the community, Ayer gave dramatic lectures in 1895 documenting the intolerable conditions in asylums. Her career as a journalist commenced a year later, when in 1896 she was hired by the New York World to write and edit their new weekly woman’s section. Her articles and her book were in the vanguard for women seeking to improve themselves during the last quarter of the nineteenth century.

== Editor of the New York World women's pages ==
Following her success as an entrepreneur, her articles and book about women’s health and beauty were in the vanguard, tapping into feminine desires that were far more than just health and beauty, but also dreams of transformation and social advancement. Although she did not belong to the emergent feminist movements of her day, she epitomized the independent woman, played a part in the new mass journalism, and paved the way for later women entrepreneurs.

It is Harriet Hubbard Ayer who inaugurated the beauty industry and women’s acceptance of cosmetic products that would help change grooming habits. She anticipated modern American consumer culture and identified women as consumers for whom shopping became a leisure activity and makeup a necessity. This was the beginning of a new identity for women as consumers to whom advertisers directed their promotions.

When Ayer died of pneumonia and nephritis at the age of 54 in New York, she was the highest paid female journalist in the United States and was receiving 20,000 letters a year.
