= Andy Warhol Art Authentication Board =

The Andy Warhol Art Authentication Board was a committee established in 1995 by the Andy Warhol Foundation for the Visual Arts to examine and determine the authenticity of works attributed to Pop artist Andy Warhol. It operated for 17 years before being dissolved in 2012, after facing multiple costly legal challenges, and was intended to protect the integrity of Warhol's oeuvre while supporting the foundation’s mission.

== History ==
The organization was created in association with the Andy Warhol Foundation for the Visual Arts in 1995. The Board, which was based in New York City, consisted of six members. The original Board members were former vice president of Andy Warhol Enterprises Vincent Fremont, Warhol's longtime partner and interior designer Jed Johnson, art curator David Whitney, and Warhol experts George Frei, Neil Printz, and Sally King-Nero. After Johnson was killed in the TWA Flight 800 explosion in 1996, he was replaced by art historian Robert Rosenblum. Fremont eventually stepped down from the authentication board to avoid a conflict of interest between his board role and selling Warhol works as the foundation's agent, but he remained a non-voting consultant.

The board met three times a year to examine works and made determinations only of authenticity, not market value. Appraisals took one month, and ARTnews reported that around 10 to 20% of submitted works were "considered questionable." The Board did not share its methodology, citing privacy concerns.

The Board sometimes received criticism for its operating methods and what was perceived as arbitrariness in judging whether or not a work was an authentic Warhol. Works deemed inauthentic that were covered prominently in the press include Brillo Boxes produced after Warhol's death and a 1964 silkscreen self-portrait that had earlier been authenticated by Warhol's business manager.

== Dissolution ==
In October 2011, the Andy Warhol Foundation Board of Directors announced they would dissolve the Authentication Board. The board had cost around $500,000 each year to run, and in 2010 they spent nearly $7 million defending an antitrust lawsuit brought by collector Joe Simon-Whelan, who accused the board of "engaging in a conspiracy to restrain and monopolise trade in the market for Warhol works."

Speaking to The New York Observer, Warhol Foundation President Joel Wachs explained the reasons for the decision, saying the Authentication Board was subjected to legal action "10 or so times" in its 15 years of operation. While it "won every single one of those lawsuits, […] the process was extraordinarily expensive, costing us at least $10 million defending ourselves. Eventually, we decided that we wanted our money to go to artists and not to lawyers."

The Foundation continues to support development of the Warhol catalogues raisonnés, which encompass judgements about the authenticity of individual works. Wachs explained that the catalogue project is primarily scholarly and not explicitly connected to the art market. The editors review works submitted for possible inclusion, but do not render judgement outside the context of the catalogues themselves.
