= 57 East 66th Street =

House in Manhattan, New York

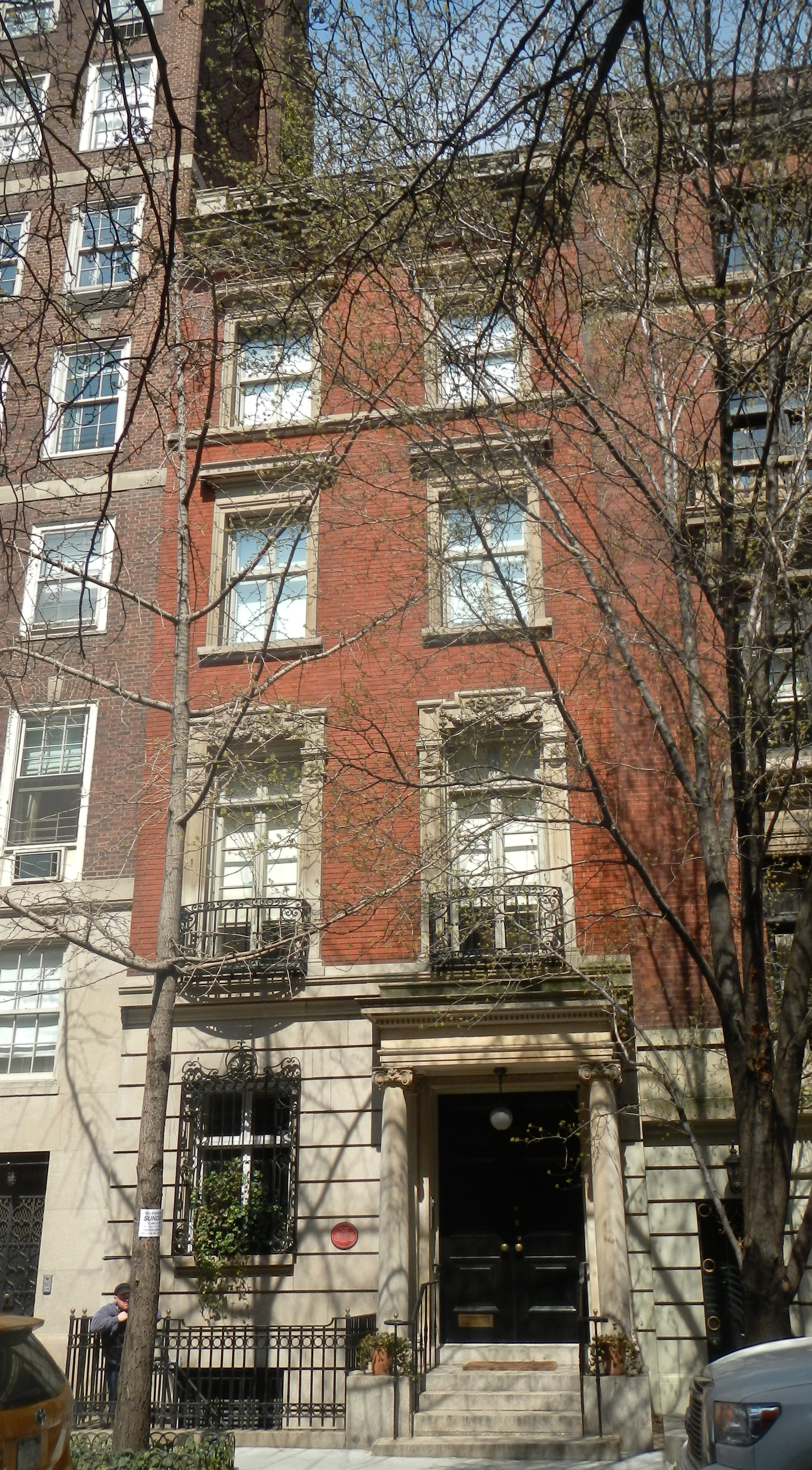
- Interactive map of the 57 East 66th Street area

General information
- Architectural style: Neo-Georgian
- Location: 57 East 66th Street; Manhattan, New York City
- Coordinates: 40°46′04″N 73°58′02″W
- Year built: 1902

Technical details
- Size: 8,000 sq ft

Design and construction
- Architect: Augustus N. Allen

57 East 66th Street, also known as the J. A. Murray House, is a townhouse located on the Upper East Side of Manhattan in New York City. Built in 1902, the residence is best known for its association with Pop artist Andy Warhol, who lived there from 1974 to 1987. The townhouse was designated a cultural landmark with a commemorative plaque unveiled in 1998.

== Early history (1877–1900) ==
Designed by architect J. H. Valentine and completed in 1877, the original four-story brownstone was built as the home of Ira E. Doying. In 1890, the residence was acquired by Henry Van Deventer Black and his wife, Jennie Prince Black. Mrs. Black, a composer and musician, was a prominent figure in New York society and the author of nearly 100 musical compositions. She was also the founder of the committee that raised funds for and oversaw the erection of the Washington Irving Memorial.

By the turn of the 20th century, the character of the neighborhood was shifting as Fifth Avenue and the Upper East Side began to see the construction of larger, more architecturally ambitious residences. On December 22, 1900, The New York Times reported that Jennie P. Black had sold "the four-story brownstone-front dwelling, 57 East Sixty-sixth Street" to Samuel C. Herriman, amid a wave of high-profile real estate transactions that included properties associated with Andrew Carnegie and John Jacob Astor.

== The J. A. Murray House (1902–1927) ==
The original brownstone was replaced by a new residence commissioned by Lawyer John Archibald Murray. Murray engaged architect Augustus N. Allen to design a four-story mansion in a restrained Neo-Georgian mode that incorporated elements of neo-French Classic design. Constructed between 1901 and 1902, the brick-and-limestone house reflected a broader stylistic shift on the Upper East Side away from ornate Italianate and French palace forms toward greater architectural reserve. The rusticated base and columned portico evoked English Georgian precedents, while carved limestone swags framed the second-story windows.

Soon after the Murray family moved in, their youngest daughter, Beatrice, died at the house in October 1902 at the age of one. Murray and his wife, Alice Rathbone of Albany, raised their two daughters, Leslie and Barbara, in the house and were active participants in New York society, hosting receptions, teas, and debutante events. Leslie Murray was introduced to society in 1917 and later married Major Lewis Stuyvesant Chanler Jr. on April 17, 1920, a union widely noted in the press for joining two long-established New York families. The wedding reception was held at the East 66th Street house. A year later, the Murrays hosted a debutante dinner for their daughter, Barbara. After both daughters married, they sold the house in 1927.

== The Bartow family (1927–1962) ==
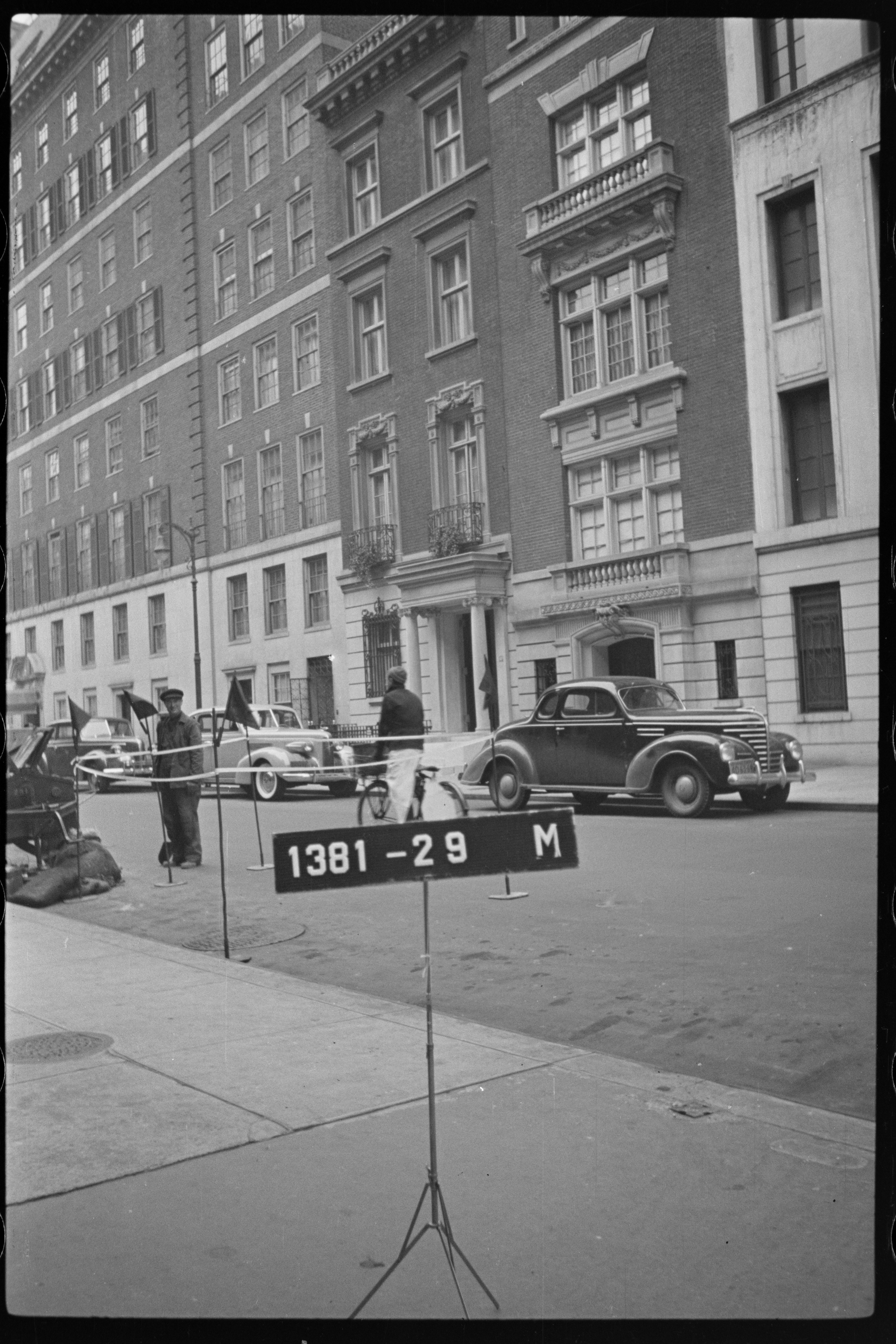
57 East 66th Street as it looked in a 1940 tax photo

The house next became the residence of Francis Dwight Bartow, a vice president of J. P. Morgan & Co., who lived there with his wife and two sons. During the Great Depression, the Bartow family was publicly recognized for its participation in charitable relief efforts. The New York Times reported on April 1, 1932, that the family of "F. B. Bartow, 57 East Sixty-sixth Street" was the first to be placed on an official honor list for subscribing to the American Federation of Labor's block-aid campaign to support the unemployed.

Bartow continued his financial and corporate career through the early 1940s, serving as a director of General Electric until 1941, when he resigned his vice presidency at J. P. Morgan & Co. He died in 1945 at his winter home near Charleston, South Carolina. His widow remained in the East 66th Street house with their sons. Their elder son, Clarence Whittemore Bartow, later married in 1949, while the younger, Francis D. Bartow Jr., a partner in Bartow, Leeds & Co., continued to live in the house with his mother until his death in 1962.

== Andy Warhol residence (1974–1987) ==
Pop artist Andy Warhol's Lexington Avenue townhouse had become overcrowded from his growing collection, prompting him to search for a larger residence. His live-in boyfriend, Jed Johnson, toured dozens of properties, jotting down notes to keep Warhol abreast of the search. Johnson found the East 66th Street townhouse, which Warhol purchased in January 1974 for $310,000—a bargain attributed to the recent stock market crash. Despite passing inspection, the house had early issues with plumbing and the elevator. By the end of the summer, Warhol had invested an additional $70,000 in renovations, installing high-end kitchen appliances and a custom stereo system with six walnut speakers. Johnson collaborated with architect Peter Marino to renovate the kitchens and bathrooms.

Warhol entrusted the decoration of the townhouse to Johnson, who transformed it into a curated display of historical design. Influenced by the interiors he had seen while traveling with Warhol to the homes of prominent collectors and designers in Europe, Johnson applied a mix of Neoclassical, Art Deco, and Victorian styles. He assigned each room a distinct period, acquiring furniture to suit the architecture, and he later enlisted craftsman Leo Sans to create elaborate Oriental stencils on the walls. The foyer featured a bust of Napoleon, while Warhol's bedroom combined 19th-century Federal and American Empire furnishings with decorative textiles and wallpaper. The parlor was arranged with antique seating and carpets, and the Art Deco sitting room included furniture by leading early 20th-century designers. Despite his extensive art collection, he did not display his own work at home.

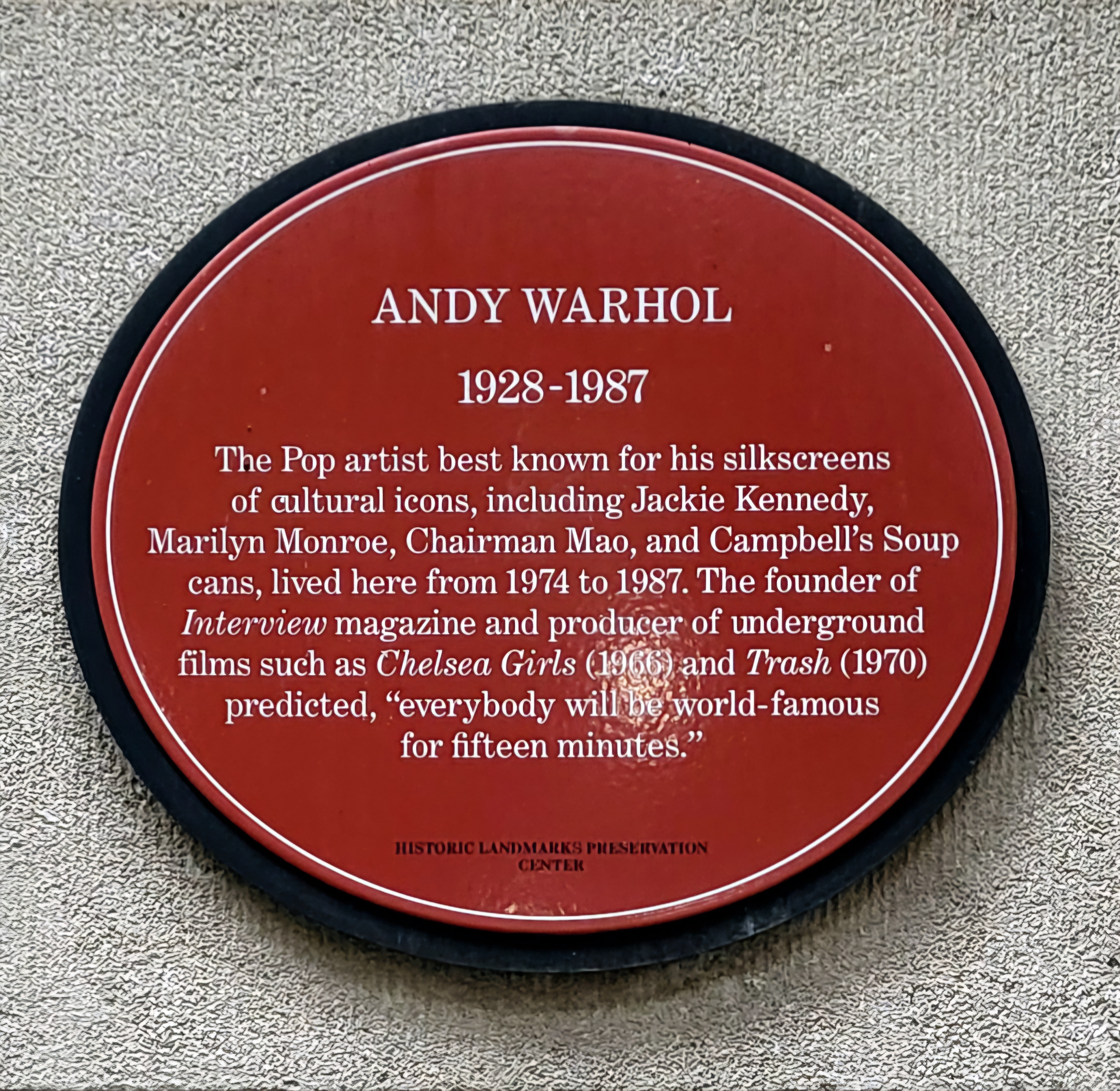
Commemorative plaque for Andy Warhol

While Johnson lived with him, Warhol promised to store his shopping bags in closets and top-floor storage rooms. Johnson ran his decorating business from the fourth floor until 1980. After he moved out, the house became increasingly filled with Warhol's acquisitions. At the time of Warhol's death in February 1987, he occupied a second-floor bedroom and a basement kitchen; all other rooms—except for quarters used by his housekeepers—were devoted to storage.

Although Warhol had a reputation for allowing virtually anyone to enter his studio, the Factory, he rarely entertained guests at his home. It was not until after Warhol's death that Johnson's work on the house was widely documented. The interior was photographed by Evelyn Hofer for the July 1987 issue of Vanity Fair, by Robert Mapplethorpe for the December 1987 issue of House & Garden, and in 1987 by Elizabeth Heyert for her book Metropolitan Places (1989). Some argued Warhol's house should be preserved as an "art-world Graceland," but his will made no provisions for maintaining the home or his collection. In April 1988, a private tour of his home was arranged by Sotheby's before his enormous collection was sold during a 10-day auction.

On August 6, 1998, in celebration of Warhol's 70th birthday, the Historic Landmark Preservation dedicated a plaque to the townhouse to honor the artist.

== Later owners (1991–Present) ==
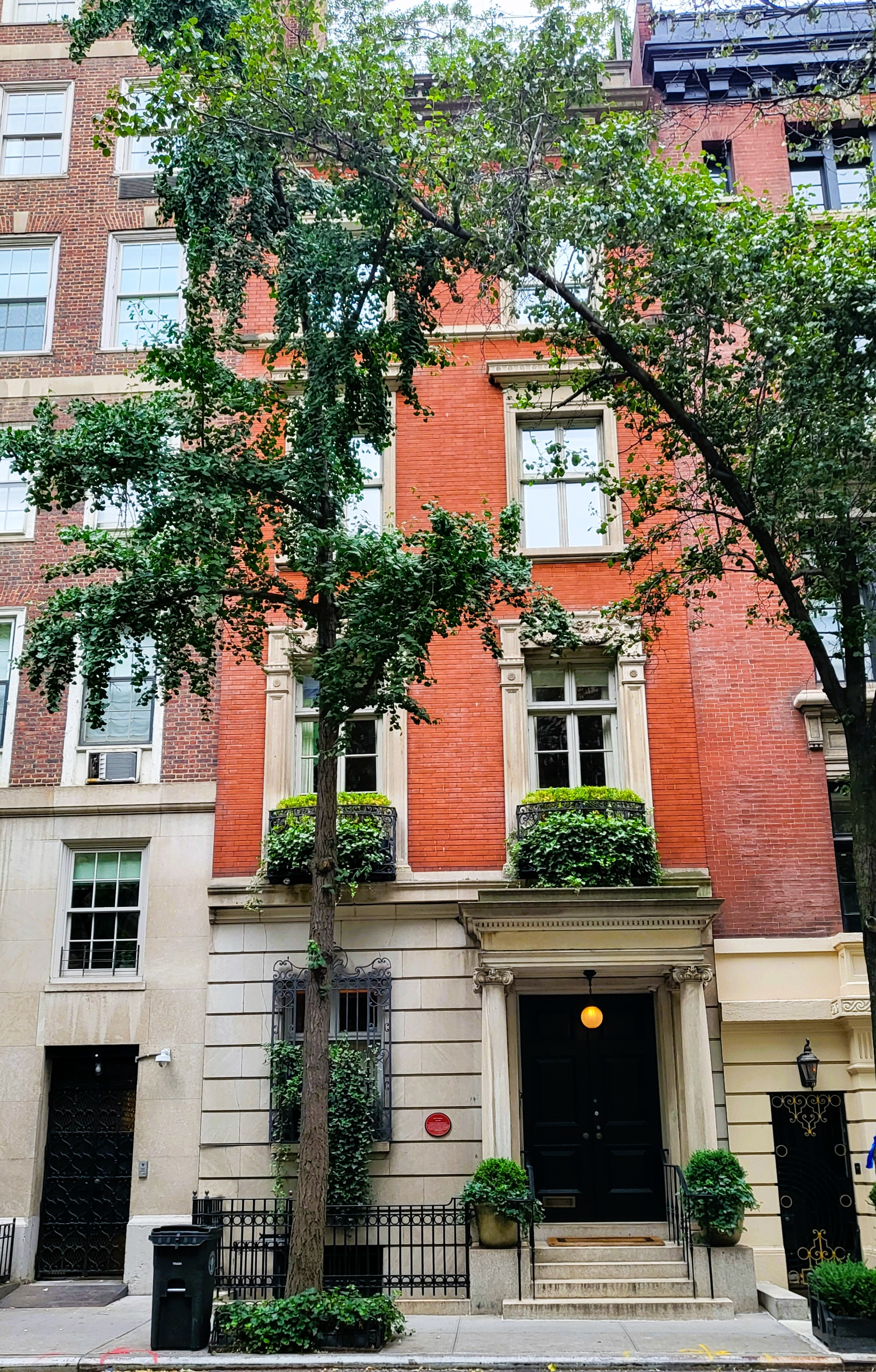
The townhouse pictured in 2025

Soon after Warhol's death, the street number "57" was stolen from the façade, prompting later owners, Adolfo Barnatán and Elena Benaroche, to install a gate at the front of the property, which has since been removed. In 1991, the townhouse was purchased for $3 million by Barnatán and Benaroche, who never occupied it. Two years later, they sold the house for $3.35 million. The subsequent owners made some upgrades but preserved the original architecture.

In January 2000, the 8,000-square-foot townhouse was sold to Tom Freston, chairman of MTV, for $6.5 million. Freston remodeled the property and listed it for $38.5 million in 2008, later reducing the asking price to $35 million before taking it off the market later that year.
