= Vincent Fremont =

Vincent Fremont (born 1950) is an American art magazine publishing executive, film director, and producer. A key figure in Pop artist Andy Warhol's circle during the 1970s and 1980s, Fremont served as vice president of Andy Warhol Enterprises. After Warhol's death in 1987, he became a founding director and sales agent of the Andy Warhol Foundation for the Visual Arts. He later served on the Andy Warhol Art Authentication Board. Fremont produced the television series Andy Warhol's TV (1980–1983) and Andy Warhol's Fifteen Minutes (1985–1987), was associate producer of Slaves of New York (1989), and co-directed and co-produced Pie in the Sky: The Brigid Berlin Story (2000). In 2016, he was appointed CEO of ARTnews, stepping down the following year while remaining an adviser.

== Biography ==
Fremont was born the son of two artists in San Diego and raised in Los Angeles.

As a teenager, Fremont played in a band called the Babies, which was taken under the wing of underground filmmaker Paul Morrissey in 1969. Morrissey, who had previously managed the Velvet Underground, invited the group to stay at his apartment in the East Village, Manhattan. In August 1969, Fremont visited New York for the first time and stopped by the Factory with friends. Struck by "the brilliance of Andy Warhol's vision," he became determined to join Warhol's circle.

After the Babies disbanded, Fremont relocated to New York and was hired full-time at the Factory in 1971. He started "at the bottom" by sweeping the floors, answering the phone, and running film cans up to the lab. As Warhol became more fascinated with documenting his daily life, Fremont was tasked with videotaping the ongoing activity at the Factory. He also managed Warhol's rental property at his Eothen estate in Montauk, New York.

By the late 1970s, Fremont had become the vice president of Andy Warhol Enterprises. He produced Andy Warhol's TV (1980–83) and Andy Warhol's Fifteen Minutes (1985–87). Following Warhol's death in 1987, Fremont was a founding director of the Andy Warhol Foundation for the Visual Arts. From 1987 to 2010, he was also the foundation's sales agent. He was briefly a board member of the Andy Warhol Art Authentication Board.

Fremont was an associate producer of the 1989 film Slaves of New York, adapted from the short story collection of the same name by Tama Janowitz. Fremont and his wife Shelly Dunn Fremont co-directed and co-produced Pie in the Sky: The Brigid Berlin Story (2000), a documentary on Warhol superstar Brigid Berlin.

In 2016, Fremont was named CEO of ARTnews, Ltd, the parent company of ARTnews, Art in America, The Magazine Antiques, and Modern. He stepped down from the executive position in 2017 but stayed on as an advisor to the company.

In 2017, Fremont and Shelly were honored for their philanthropy at Artwalk, an annual event supporting the homeless in New York. Their friend, the frontwoman of Blondie, Debbie Harry presented the award to them.

Fremont and Shelly were among the on-screen interviewees in the 2022 Netflix docuseries The Andy Warhol Diaries.
