= Andy Warhol's Fifteen Minutes =

- Country of origin: United States
- No. of seasons: 1
- No. of episodes: 5

Original release
- Network: MTV
- Release: October 20, 1985 – 1987

Related
- Andy Warhol's T.V.

Andy Warhol's Fifteen Minutes is an American talk show hosted by artist Andy Warhol, that aired on MTV from 1985 to 1987. One of the network's earliest series, it featured interviews with up-and-coming musicians such as Courtney Love. Other such talk show guests include Debbie Harry and Chris Stein of Blondie, Nick Rhodes of Duran Duran, Ric Ocasek of the Cars, the Ramones, Grace Jones, Yoko Ono, Judd Nelson, Kevin Dillon, John C. McGinley, and William S. Burroughs.

== See also ==
- 15 minutes of fame
