= Dominick & Haff =

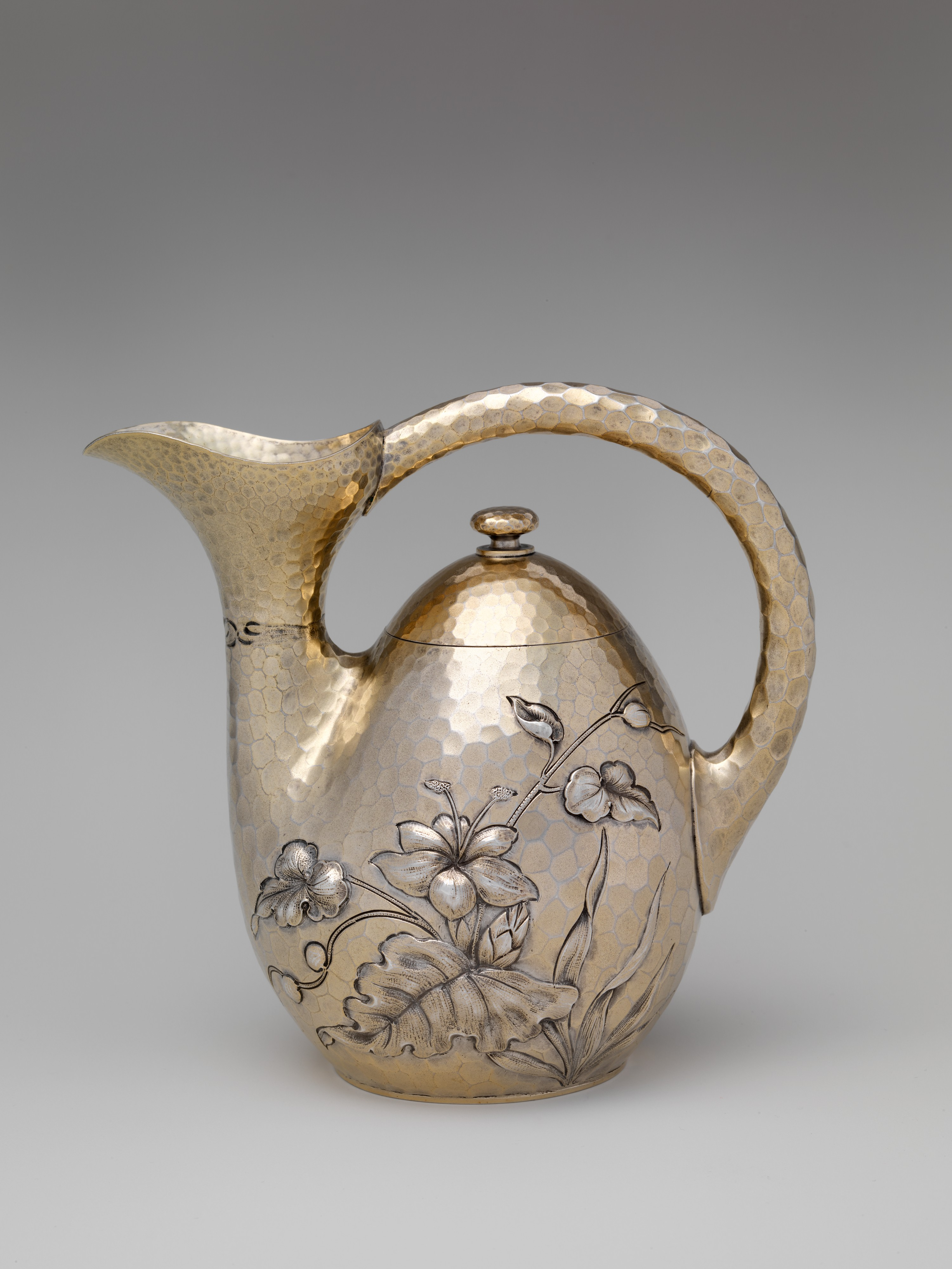
A Dominick & Haff wine pot at The Met.

Dominick & Haff was an American silver manufacturer based in New York City. It was co-founded by Henry Blanchard Dominick and Leroy B. Haff in 1872, incorporated in 1889, and it closed down in 1928. The firm designed pots, mugs, centerpieces, spoons, tea sets and kettles. Examples can be seen at the Metropolitan Museum of Art, the Brooklyn Museum, Cooper Hewitt, the Indianapolis Museum of Art, the Art Institute of Chicago, the Museum of Fine Arts, Houston, and the Rhode Island School of Design Museum.
