= Elizabeth Heyert =

American photographer and author (born 1951)

Elizabeth Heyert (born 1951 in New York City) is an American photographer and author. She received her master's degree in photography and the history of photography from the Royal College of Art, London, where she studied with Bill Brandt. She is known for experimental portrait photography, most notably her trilogy The Sleepers (2003), The Travelers (2005), and The Narcissists (2008), and her groundbreaking project The Bound (2016).

Heyert is the author of numerous books of and about photography including The Glass-House Years (Allanheld and Schram, 1979), Metropolitan Places (Viking Studio Books, 1989), The Sleepers (Sei Swann, 2003), and The Travelers (Scalo Verlag, 2006), The Narcissists (Silvana Editoriale, 2008) and The Outsider (Damiani 2017).

== Career ==
After shooting around the world for publications such as The New York Times, New York Magazine, Vogue and British Vogue, Elle Decor, and Architectural Digest, and for clients including Ralph Lauren, Cartier, American Express, and Tiffany & Co. her successful career allowed her to close her commercial studio in 1999, to return to a more personal exploration of photography. She began The Sleepers with the idea of experimenting with unconventional forms of portrait photography. Within three years she was offered her first one-person show of these works, which opened at the Edwynn Houk gallery in New York, in January 2003. The Sleepers, a series of monumental toned black and white photographs of sleeping nudes, is a meditation on the mystical world of sleep and the emotional journey we travel in our unconscious state. Reviewing the exhibit The New Yorker wrote that the work: "conjures thoughts of human fragility and impermanence even if the sleepers have become heroic sculptures rising from a deep slumber." Sei Swann published a monograph of The Sleepers, with an essay inspired by the works, written by the playwright John Guare, in January 2003.

Heyert's obsession with sleep and the unconscious led her inevitably to photograph The Travelers, a series of large-scale color post-mortem portraits. The photographs stirred discussion and controversy when they were first exhibited in New York. The New York Times, in a feature article about the works, described these photographs as a "peek beneath the surface at the vibrant, living face beneath the mask of death." Scalo Verlag published her book, The Travelers, in March 2006. At the end of the year Photo-Eye Magazine named The Travelers one of the best photography books of 2006.

The 30 x 40 inch photographs have been widely exhibited internationally: at the Musée de l'Élysée in Lausanne, Switzerland; at the Hayward Gallery in London; in Austria in New Art/New York: Reflections of the Human Condition; and in a solo museum show at the Malmo Museer in Sweden. In May 2007, 18 life size prints of The Travelers were exhibited on a small island in Naarden, The Netherlands, accessible only through an ancient stone tunnel, as part of an exhibition entitled In Memoriam. The works have also been the subject of television programs by ARD Kulturweltspiegel in Germany and by TVE Spain, a National Public Radio program, and feature articles in Sueddeutsche Zeitung, El Mundo, in the Swiss publications Le Temps and Femina, and Vrij Nederland among others.

Heyert's work has been extensively reviewed and discussed in leading international publications such as The New York Times, the Times of London, Le Monde, and Stern and in contemporary publications such as The Drawbridge and Dazed and Confused. Her photographs are part of the permanent collections of the Metropolitan Museum of Art and the San Francisco Museum of Modern Art, the J. Paul Getty Museum, and the Beinecke Library of Rare Books, and Manuscripts at Yale as well as numerous private collections.

Her most recent projects include The Bound (2016), which explores the body as a site for experimentation and transformation, and The Outsider (2017), a conceptual photography project shot in China. She is currently at work on The Idol, a new series that explores religion and popular culture, and the ways society creates myths and false images about women.

== Books ==
- The Glass-House Years (1979) ISBN 0-86043-199-1
- Metropolitan Places (1989) ISBN 0-670-81743-0
- The Sleepers (2003) ISBN 1-56466-105-9
- The Travelers (2006) ISBN 3-908247-93-4
- The Narcissists (2008) ISBN 978-0-615-28012-7
- The Outsider (2017) ISBN 978-88-6208-544-1
