= Metropolitan Home =

American magazine

- Editor-in-Chief: Donna Warner
- Categories: Interior design
- Frequency: Bi-monthly
- Publisher: Hearst Magazines
- Founded: 1974, 2016 (relaunch)
- Country: United States
- Based in: New York City, New York
- Language: English
- Website: metropolitanhome.com
- ISSN: 0273-2858

Metropolitan Home is an interior design magazine published by Hearst Magazines. The magazine focuses on "high-end modern design and interiors, blended with intelligent reporting, to connect with a progressive reader mindset."

== History and profile ==
The magazine was launched in 1969 as Apartment Life. It focused primarily on urban lifestyles. The final issue of Apartment Life was February 1981. In April 1981, the publisher rebranded it as Metropolitan Home.

Metropolitan Home was part of the Meredith Corporation until 1992 when it was acquired by Hachette Publications. The first issue under Hachette appeared in January 1993. The publisher reduced it from monthly to bi-monthly publication. Its annual Design 100 issue was their largest selling single issue.

In 2009, Hachette decided to concentrate on its top interior design magazine, Elle Decor, and shut down Metropolitan Home. The December 2009 issue of Metropolitan Home was the last issue published until 2016.

In 2016, new owner Hearst began publishing Metropolitan Home.
