= Collection of Andy Warhol =

Andy Warhol's collection was an eclectic body of objects, artworks, books, furniture, and jewelry, amassed by the American Pop artist Andy Warhol. Warhol was a collector and compulsive shopper, frequently visiting antique shops, flea markets, and auction houses in search of new acquisitions. He also created the Time Capsules, a long-running project of sealed containers filled with personal memorabilia, correspondence, photographs, and other ephemera from his daily life.

Warhol's extensive collection reflects his interest in consumerism, antiques, and fine art. Most of his collection remained private during his lifetime, although select items were displayed in the exhibition Andy Warhol's Folk and Funk at the Museum of American Folk Art in 1977. After his death, the contents of his collection were dispersed in a monumental 1988 Sotheby's auction in New York, where nearly 10,000 items were sold over ten days for $25.3 million, often achieving prices well above estimates and attracting high-profile bidders. The sale revealed the extraordinary scale and variety of his collection, and underscored the market value attached to Warhol's provenance.

== Collecting habits ==
He shopped for two or three hours a day for as many years as I can remember. He started buying American Indian artifacts first ... He bought Americana then, too, because he loved everything he saw at Serendipity. ... the Tiffany lamps, the carousel horses, the Punches and old trade signs that helped propel him toward Pop insights. After that he bought primitive portraits and country painted furniture, then high-style painted furniture. Then on to Federal furniture in 1974 after he bought a Georgian-style townhouse.

— Jed Johnson (1988)

Andy Warhol was an avid collector described as a "pack rat" who preserved a vast array of objects and personal effects. He often concealed the extent of his possessions and wealth. According to his partner Jed Johnson, "Andy had the peasant's wisdom that if people (either the very rich or the very poor) knew that you had anything good, they'd probably try to take it away from you. So he hid what he had. It was inconspicuous consumption." Warhol stored valuables in unconventional ways such as hiding jewelry in Famous Amos cookie tins atop the canopy of his bed and keeping cash in his mattress. Although Warhol did not drive, he owned a Mercedes-Benz, and later a Rolls-Royce Silver Shadow, which he instructed Johnson to explain that it had been traded for art.

Warhol frequently purchased items on daily shopping excursions, and in later years was often accompanied by his friend, art collector Stuart Pivar, who recalled that they sought "to see if we could come across a couple of masterpieces or some amusing junk." Pivar regarded Warhol as the quintessential connoisseur who navigated society through flea markets, antique shops, and Christie's and Sotheby's salerooms. He observed that Johnson "influenced Andy to appreciate fine old things." "Andy loved to horse-trade," said Pivar, "especially trading things against his own work." When Warhol painted Pivar's portrait, he received art in exchange, including a 19th-century harem scene attributed to Georges Clairin. He also noted that Warhol envisioned "Warhol Hall" on Madison Avenue, a large gift shop and museum to display his collection of sculptures. Warhol's business manager and estate executor Fred Hughes confirmed these plans, adding that they had even considered operating a flea market booth.

Warhol agreed to confine his shopping bags to closets and top-floor storage areas while Johnson lived with him, but after Johnson's departure in December 1980, his townhouse was quickly overrun by his accumulating acquisitions. By the time of his death in February 1987, Warhol occupied only a bedroom and the basement kitchen, while most of the townhouse—aside from the quarters of his Filipino housekeepers, Nena and Aurora Bugarin—was used for storage.

Essays in the Sotheby's catalogs for the sale of Warhol's collection emphasized his compulsive collecting: Interior designer Suzie Frankfurt wrote that he "believed in holding on to everything, squirreling it all away," recalling he occasionally wore jewelry "in secret," while printmaker Rupert Jasen Smith quipped, "Perhaps he should have gone to Collectors' Anonymous." "The incongruities amount to a universe of objects, possessions and collections of collections," said art curator Henry Geldzahler. Johnson described his collecting as driven by "the action," and art critic David Bourdon noted he was "forever searching for that mythical $5 find that would turn out to be worth $1 million."

== Time Capsules ==
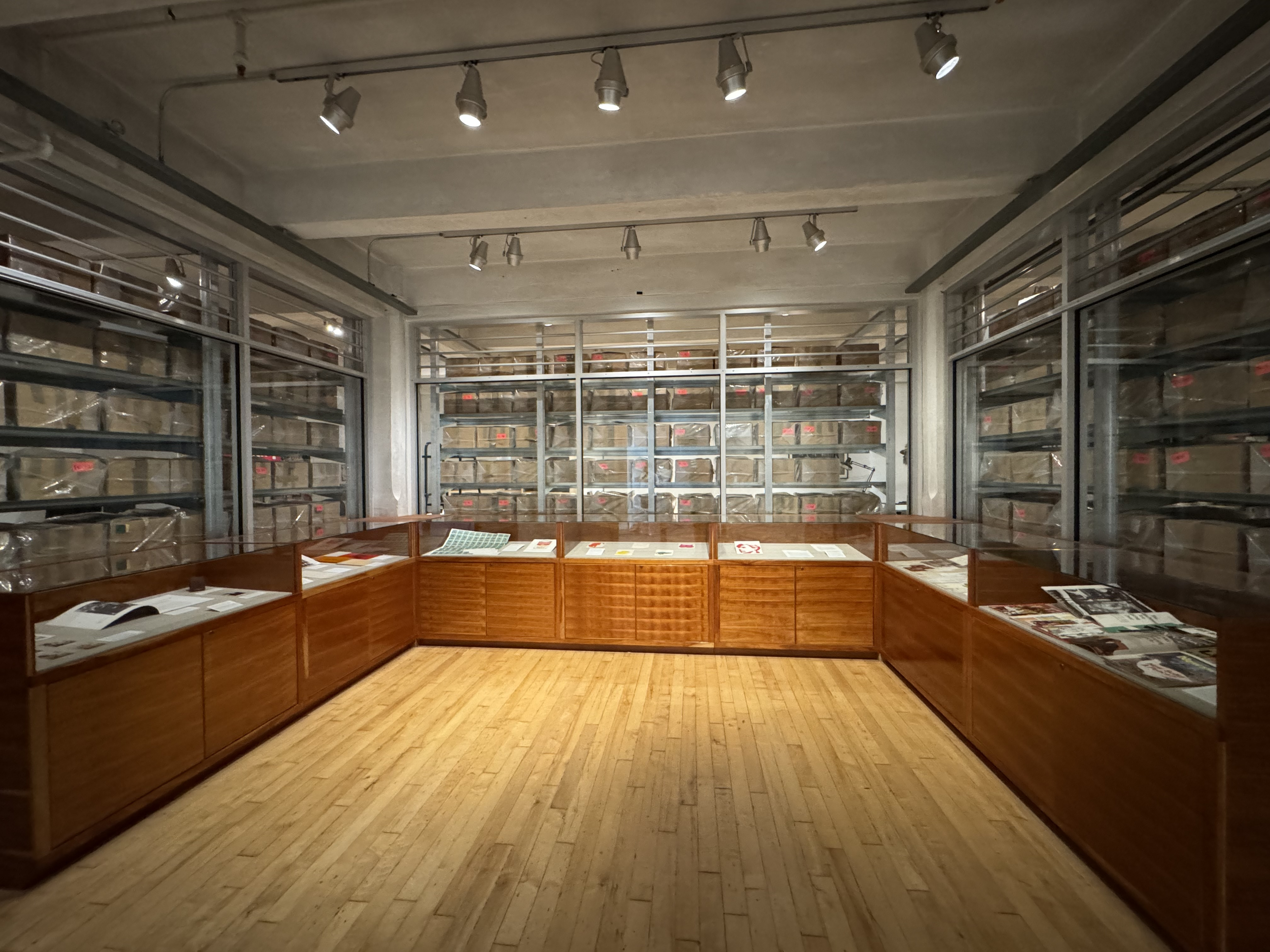
Warhol's Time Capsules on display at the Andy Warhol Museum

Beginning in 1974, Warhol assembled his Time Capsules, a conceptual archive made up of 610 containers, each holding an average of 800 items. The majority of the containers are standard cardboard boxes, with a large trunk and forty filing cabinet drawers. This also includes the time capsules that Warhol created at home, which hold a plethora of personal memorabilia like letters, telephone messages, photographs, and his mother's possessions. These containers documented his daily life and working habits, as well as his relationships and interests. After Warhol's death, his Time Capsules were transferred to the Andy Warhol Museum in Pittsburgh.

== Decorative arts ==
=== Folk art ===
Warhol began collecting American folk art in the 1950s, making it one of his earliest areas of interest. In 1977, Warhol's collection was the subject of the exhibition Andy Warhol's Folk and Funk at the Museum of American Folk Art in New York. Highlights of the show included a cracked 1830 bust of Leonardo da Vinci, a c. 1875 tobacconist's shop sign with a pipe held by a stylized hand, and a carousel horse. Critics emphasized the attic-like installation and linked the exhibition to Warhol's broader collecting practices. However, the full extent of his holdings became widely known only after his death.

His collection reflected a strong engagement with 19th-century and early 20th-century American popular culture. His possession included unpainted wooden store figures and Coca-Cola memorabilia, trade signs, Navajo blanket rugs, a painted cast-iron Washington stove figure, as well as a carved and painted pine cigar store princess and a bear pull-toy. Among the most notable pieces was a carved and painted pine Punch attributed to "Jersey Jim" Campbell of New Jersey, c. 1870–1880, depicting a Pierrot-costumed figure with a tasseled cap. When asked how his interest developed, Warhol replied: "Well—um... the reason. I like folk art is that most of the best of it—the quilts, the painted furniture—was done by women." He added, "It's the best woman‐art around."

=== The Factory ===
Later incarnations of Warhol's studio, the Factory, were shaped in part by the presence of large Art Deco furnishings. The screening room featured a complete set of twelve bronze side chairs upholstered in red leather, designed by Edgar Brandt. The wooden paneled executive office contained a large oval table veneered in Macassar ebony, accompanied by twelve matching chairs designed by Émile-Jacques Ruhlmann. According to Warhol some of the furniture had originally been acquired as "used furniture," having previously served as props for a film production. He also had Carlo Bugatti furniture. Warhol had an interest in taxidermy and kept stuffed animals at the Factory, which are now at the Andy Warhol Museum in Pittsburgh.

=== Home and furnishing ===
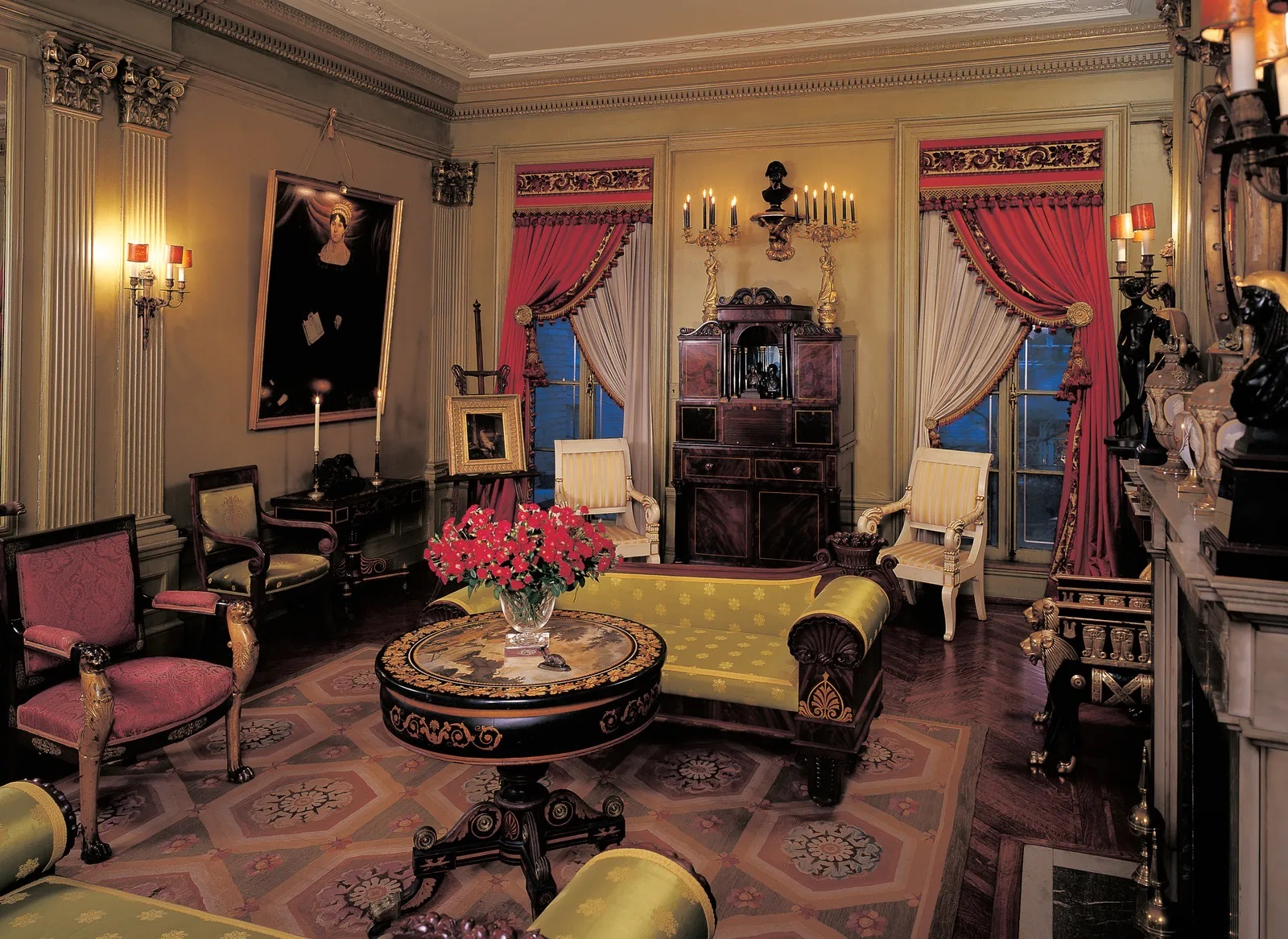
The parlor with Federal furniture, Aubusson carpet, and traditional paintings, including a Lawrence Alma-Tadema and a Guy Pène du Bois. An Egyptian Revival chair is beyond the fireplace, and a mahogany secretary.

Warhol's collecting extended to interior decoration, providing an opportunity for his partner Jed Johnson to develop his craft. Johnson organized Warhol's collection at their home at 1342 Lexington Avenue in Manhattan, but as acquisitions increasingly overwhelmed the townhouse, they relocated to a larger residence at 57 East 66th Street in 1974. After months of preparation by Johnson, movers spent five days transferring the contents of the house. Johnson created several ornate neoclassical period rooms and described his work on the four-story townhouse as "experiments in decoration."

The foyer was dominated by a large bust of Napoleon and a life-size painting by George Bellows. The Federal-style parlor featured an array of early 19th-century American furniture, carefully arranged by Johnson. He chose a yellow-green wall color and period-style draperies with handmade silk trim to complement the setting, which included a pair of 1835 gilded and carved mahogany Récamier sofas by Anthony Quervell of Philadelphia flanking the fireplace, a painted and stenciled brass-mounted slate-top table attributed to John Finlay of Baltimore, an Egyptian Revival gilt and painted arm chair from the early 20th century, a carved, gilded, and inlaid mahogany secretary made in Philadelphia about 1820, and a French Aubusson carpet. The parlor was Johnson's twin brother Jay Johnson's favorite room, who recalled:

He [Jed] spent hundreds of hours researching the Federalist period and tried to make the room as authentic as possible. He bought the best collection of American Federalist furniture that he could find and had the curtain-maker from the Metropolitan Museum craft the draperies. It was a room that was never used by anyone. It was like a period room at the Met. The few people that came over always stood in the doorway as if it were roped off and just looked."

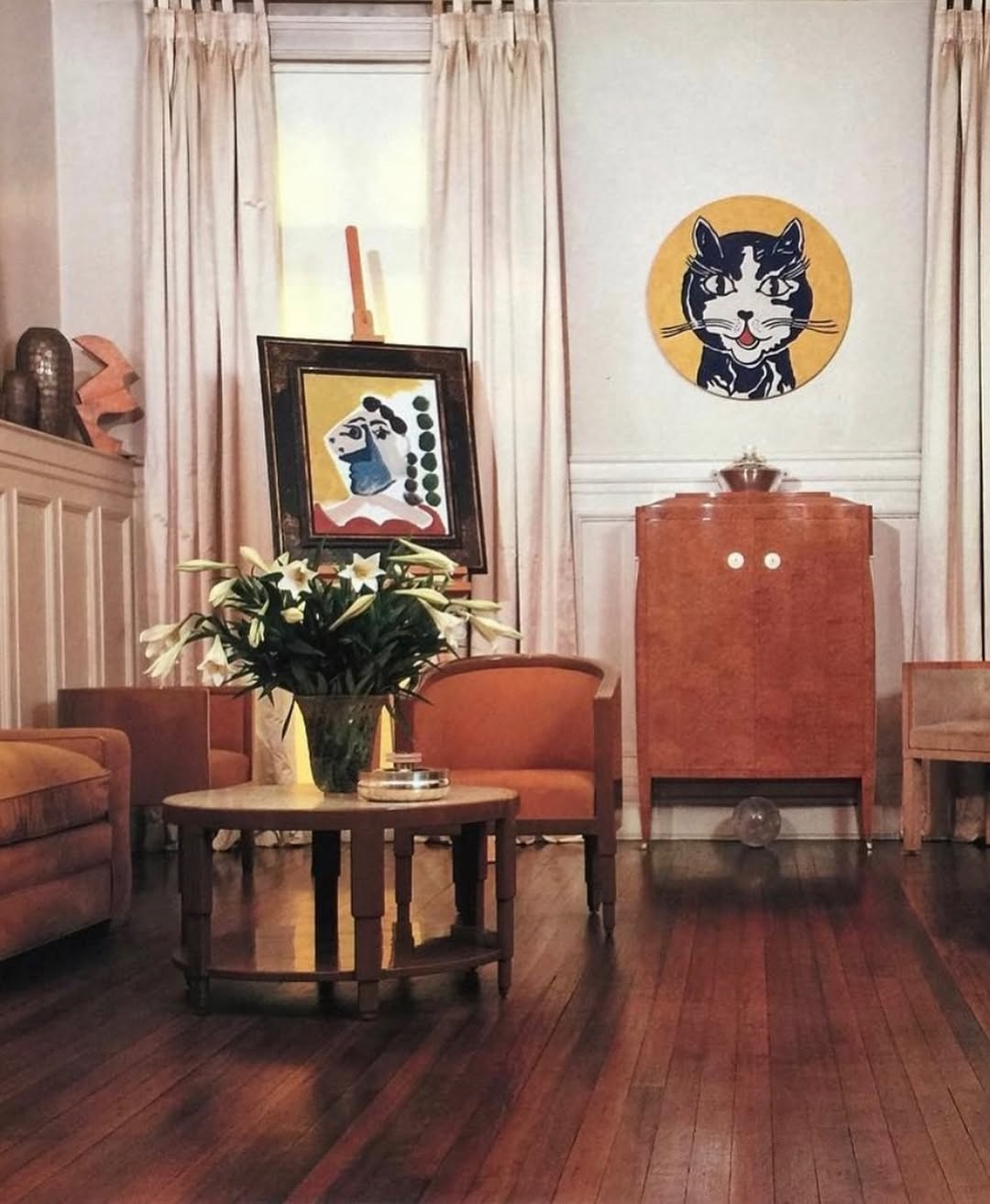
In the sitting room, Laughing Cat (1961) by Roy Lichtenstein hangs over a Jacques Émile Ruhlmann cabinet. On the right, a chair by André Groult. On the left, a sofa by Jean-Michel Frank, two lacquer chairs and silver by Jean Puiforcat on the table. Photo by Robert Mapplethorpe for House & Garden, 1987

In the Art Deco sitting room, furnishings included a 1926 amboyna cabinet by Jacques-Émile Ruhlmann, a Pierre Legrain galuchat cabinet, an upholstered sharkskin chair by André Groult, a sofa by Jean-Michel Frank, two lacquer chairs and a table with an eggshell finish by Jean Dunand.

Warhol assembled a wide-ranging decorative arts collection, including silver by Jean Puiforcat, a five-piece panelled tea and coffee set (c. 1925–30), and a silver and aventurine tureen (c. 1930–40), alongside pieces by Gérard Sandoz and Jean Després. He also collected silver from the Wiener Werkstätte, including 41 works primarily designed by Josef Hoffmann, notably a pair of trumpet-form vases and a tazza (both c. 1910).

His collection of French art glass comprised 31 works, chiefly by René Lalique, as well as pieces by Jean Luce, Almeric Walter, and Gabriel Argy-Rousseau, including a molded amber glass vase (c. 1925) and a pâte-de-verre clock. Warhol also amassed large groups of American decorative objects, including 175 cookie jars and 332 pieces of Fiesta ware.

Warhol's bedroom was centered on a Federal carved mahogany four-poster bed and secretary, made in Philadelphia around 1820. He also had American Empire furniture, including a miniature sleigh bed, originally a doll's bed (c. 1840), for his dachshunds Archie and Amos, along with an extensive toy collection for them. His bedroom also featured French antique wallpaper by Joseph Dufour, chintz curtains from Warhol superstar Baby Jane Holzer, paintings by Henri Rousseau and John Blunt, and a Tiffany Favrile lamp. Craftsman Leo Sans was commissioned by Johnson to create elaborate Oriental stencils on the walls and ceiling.

The fourth-floor guest bedroom featured hand-stenciled walls and original 19th-century curtains, arranged around a suite of furniture by Gustave Herter. Decorative elements included a bronze figure of Mercury, a valise by Marcel Duchamp placed on an American Renaissance Revival chair, and a bronze sculpture by Antoine-Louis Barye, and a gold sculpture by Jean-Léon Gérôme. The lighting fixtures—a lamp and wall sconces—were by Cornelius & Co.

Although Warhol was known for welcoming a wide range of visitors to the Factory, he seldom received guests in his home. It was only after his death that Johnson's work on the townhouse became widely recognized. The interiors were documented through photographs by Evelyn Hofer for Vanity Fair (July 1987), Robert Mapplethorpe for House & Garden (December 1987), and Elizabeth Heyert for her book Metropolitan Places (1989).

=== Jewelry ===
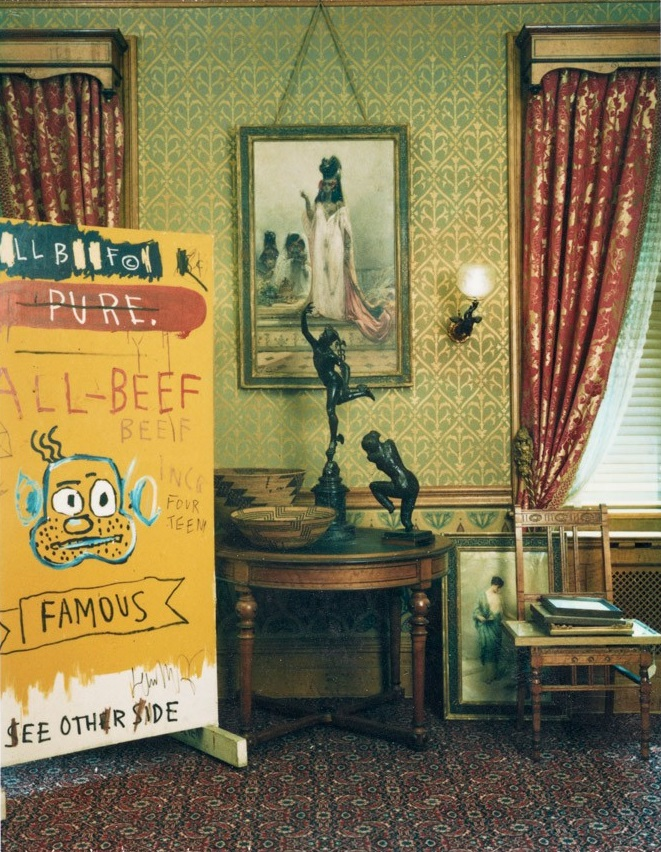
In the guest room, Jean Michel Basquiat's All Beef (1983) with a statue of Mercury on a Herter table. 19th-century curtains and sconces by Cornelius & Co. on both sides of Georges Clairin's Harem Woman. Photo by Robert Mapplethorpe for House & Garden, 1987

Warhol rarely wore jewelry but when he did wear a diamond necklace, he would often hide it beneath his clothing. He collected Art Deco jewelry and objets de vertu, assembling rings, brooches, boxes, and cigarette cases, utilizing materials such as gold, silver, ivory, bloodstone, agate, onyx, and enamel. He owned an Edwardian diamond tiara and a 9-carat diamond ring.

An early collector of 1940s jewelry, Warhol acquired numerous pieces by Cartier and Van Cleef & Arpels, favoring design over the size of gemstones. He also had jewelry by David Webb and Elsa Peretti, whose designs he particularly admired.

Warhol accumulated up to 313 watches. His collection of watches included Swiss manufacturers Rolex, Patek Philippe, and Vacheron Constantin, as well as American manufacturers Waltham Watch Company, Hamilton Watch Company, Bulova, and Movado. He also had watches by Cartier, Bulgari, Tiffany, and Piaget.

=== Fragrances ===
Warhol had a lifelong fascination with perfume and maintained what he called his "permanent smell collection." Beginning in the early 1960s, he saved bottles of fragrances after wearing them, typically using one perfume for about three months before switching to another. He associated each scent with the period in which he wore it, regarding perfume as a means of preserving memories. In his book The Philosophy of Andy Warhol (1975), Warhol said that he wanted to create a "smell museum" so that particular scents would not be lost forever.

His collection included bottles of Halston spray cologne, Penhaligon's Blenheim Bouquet, Braggi International cologne, Ma Griffe by Carven, Paris by Yves Saint Laurent, and Devin by Aramis. Warhol reportedly rubbed Joy perfume on his dachshund Archie. At Warhol's funeral, his friend Paige Powell tossed copies of Interview and a bottle of Estée Lauder's Beautiful Eau de Parfum into his grave.

Warhol also incorporated fragrances into his work. In 1967, he created You're In / Eau d'Andy by filling silver-painted Coca-Cola bottles with a citrus-scented perfume. In 1985, he produced silkscreens depicting Chanel No. 5 bottles for his Ads series.

== Fine art ==
Warhol's art collection comprised 19th-century, modern, and contemporary art. His postwar holdings prominently featured contemporaries such as Jasper Johns, Roy Lichtenstein, Robert Rauschenberg, James Rosenquist, David Hockney, and Cy Twombly, as well as younger artists who emerged in the 1980s such as Sandro Chia, Jean-Michel Basquiat, and Keith Haring. Despite his own fame as an artist, Johnson said Warhol considered it "too corny" to hang his own work at home.

Highlights included works acquired directly from Johns, such as Screen Piece (1967) and Light Bulb (1958). Paintings in the collection included by Portrait of Two Girls in Pantaloons (mid-1800s) by Joseph Whiting Stock, Mignon Pensive (1869) by William-Adolphe Bouguereau, Miss Bentham (1906) by George Bellows, Peinture féminin (1954) by Man Ray, Laughing Cat (1961), Mirror (1971), and Sailboats (1974) by Lichtenstein, Dos Cabezas (1982) and All Beef (1983) by Basquiat. At the Factory, The Wind (c. 1919) by David Forrester Wilson hung in the wooden paneled boardroom.

His collection extended to 19th-century European art, including sculptures by Antoine-Louis Barye, Antonio Canova, Jean-Baptiste Carpeaux, and Jean-Léon Gérôme, as well as additional works by artists including Marcel Duchamp, Henri Rousseau, Georges Clairin, and Franz Hagenauer.

== Books ==
Warhol collected many books, with more than 1,200 titles in his collection. His collection, which reflects his eclectic taste and interests, included:

- Dream Days (1902) by Kenneth Grahame
- The Decorative Art of Leon Bakst (1913) by Leon Bakst
- Artists in Uniform (1934) by Max Eastman
- Blood of a Poet (1949) by Jean Cocteau
- Genius and the Mobocracy (1949) by Frank Lloyd Wright
- My Life's History (1952) by Grandma Moses
- Hidden Faces (1944) by Salvador Dalí
- Observations (1959) by Richard Avedon
- Hell's Angels (1967) by Hunter S. Thompson
- The Great Book of Jewels (1974) by Ernst A. Heiniger
- Flashbacks: An Autobiography (1983) by Timothy Leary
- Hollywood Wives (1983) by Jackie Collins
- The Dinah Shore Cookbook (1983) by Dinah Shore
- Interference (1984) Nick Rhodes
- D.V. (1984) by Diana Vreeland
- The Two Mrs. Grenvilles: A Novel (1985) by Dominick Dunne

== Estate auction ==
Following his death in 1987, some people felt that Warhol's house should be preserved as an "art-world Graceland," keeping his enormous collection intact as a record of contemporary consumer culture. However, Warhol's will made no provisions for maintaining the house or specifying the future of his collection. In April 1988, Sotheby's arranged a private tour of Warhol's Upper East Side townhouse ahead of its monumental auction of his collection.

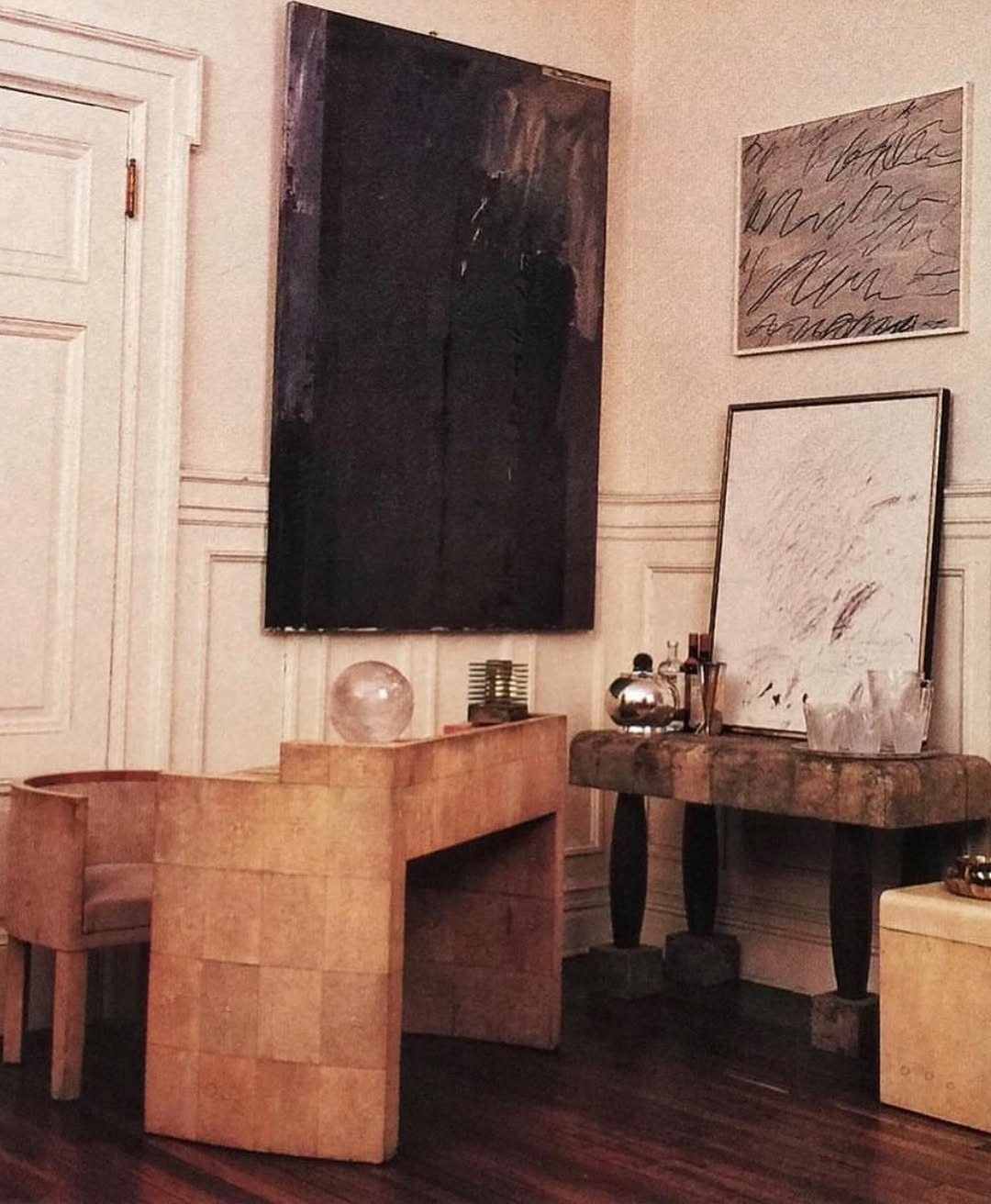
In Warhol's home, a sharkskin desk and chair are under Jasper Johns's Screen Piece (1967), and a Legrain table is under two Cy Twomblys, Roman Notes (c. 1970), and Untitled (1961). Photo by Robert Mapplethorpe for House & Garden, 1987

In 1988, Warhol's estate was auctioned at Sotheby's, where 3,436 lots comprising nearly 10,000 items were sold over ten days for a total of $25.3 million. The sale was organized by six category across multiple days: Art Nouveau and Art Deco (April 23); collectibles, jewelry, furniture, decorations, and paintings (April 24–26); jewelry and watches (April 27); American Indian art (April 28); Americana, paintings, drawings, and prints (April 29–30); and contemporary art (May 2–3).

The contents of the auction were documented in six Sotheby's catalogs—issued as a $95 box set—and for the first time in Sotheby's history, distributed to bookstores nationwide by Harry N. Abrams Inc.; each volume included an introduction written by one of Warhol's friends, offering both a comprehensive overview of the collection and personal reflections.

The auction far exceeded expectations, with many items selling for double or triple their pre-sale estimates and generating intense international interest. By the midpoint of the sale, totals had already surpassed projections, and auctioneers attributed the high prices largely to the added value of Warhol's ownership. Record prices were achieved across categories while strong attendance and competitive bidding signaled a booming market. Notable bidders included Paloma Picasso, Dick Cavett, Baby Jane Holzer, Fran Lebowitz, Peter Max, and Gedalio Grinberg.

After the auction concluded, two curators of the Andy Warhol Foundation discovered a hidden cache of jewelry at the bottom of a filing cabinet used to store Warhol's drawings and prints at his townhouse. The collection, which included hundreds of diamonds, dozens of sapphires, a 300-carat emerald, and 96 watches by makers such as Patek Philippe, Rolex, and Cartier, was sold at Sotheby's in December 1988 for $1.6 million.
