= Disappearance of Heather Elvis =

American disappearance case

Heather Elvis
- Image of Elvis circulated after her disappearance
- Born: Heather Rachelle Elvis; June 30, 1993; Horry County, South Carolina, U.S.
- Disappeared: December 18, 2013 (aged 20); Carolina Forest, South Carolina, U.S.
- Status: Missing for 12 years, 10 months and 29 days
- Education: St. James High School
- Occupations: Waitress, makeup artist
- Employer(s): Tilted Kilt, House of Blues

On December 17, 2013, Heather Elvis (born June 30, 1993), of Carolina Forest, South Carolina, United States, went on a first date with a man that ended when he dropped her off at her apartment the following morning at 1:15 a.m. The date had been Elvis's attempt to move on after a relationship with Sidney Moorer, a repairman she had met through her job at a local restaurant. At 1:44 a.m., Elvis called her roommate, Brianna Warrelmann, who was visiting family, to tell her how the date had gone. The conversation lasted approximately ten minutes. Warrelman had advised Elvis against returning Sidney's calls, and cautioned Elvis "not to do anything rash and to get some sleep." Elvis' cell phone activity ended that day around 6 a.m., and she has not been seen or heard from since.

According to some accounts, Elvis's disappearance had been a result of Sidney's wife, Tammy, learning of her husband's affair. She sent Elvis several confrontational text messages but denies any role in her disappearance. Phone records show that Elvis's and Sidney's phones were used to call each other several times in the early hours of December 18; he says the two did talk with each other briefly on two occasions, but also denies any wrongdoing—despite security camera footage showing a truck believed to be his driving to and from the boat landing where Elvis's car was found that evening.

Four months later, both Moorers were charged with murder, kidnapping, obstruction of justice, and indecent exposure; investigation also led to the couple being charged with Medicaid fraud. The murder and indecent exposure charges were dropped in 2016, but Sidney was convicted of the obstruction charge the following year. His trial on the kidnapping charges ended in a hung jury; he was convicted on retrial two years later. Shortly after the mistrial the Moorers were indicted on an additional charge of conspiracy. Tammy was convicted of both charges in October 2018. Both Moorers have lost appeals against their convictions.

Despite the convictions, many of the facts of the case remain in dispute. In text messages and posts on social media, Tammy depicted Elvis as an obsessed stalker whose attention to her husband would not have bothered her if she had not become physically threatening to the family; Elvis's friends have suggested, in turn, that Sidney privately told Elvis he wanted to continue the affair to the point of leaving his wife, who reportedly handcuffed him to the bed at night to keep him faithful to her and, Sidney's family claims, physically abused him. Sidney reported to the police several instances in which he was physically threatened while on bail from the murder charges, and posted signs decrying harassment of his children on his property; similarly, the Elvises held a news conference to denounce what they claimed was organized online harassment of them.

== Background ==
Heather Elvis was a native of Horry County, South Carolina and the older of two children of Terry and Debbie Elvis; she had a younger sister, Morgan. She graduated in 2011 from St. James High School in Murrells Inlet. She moved into her own apartment shortly afterwards in Carolina Forest, which she shared with Brianna "Bri" Warrelmann, a roommate from out of state. Elvis worked as a hostess at the Tilted Kilt in Myrtle Beach and House of Blues in North Myrtle Beach while studying cosmetology.

=== Affair with Sidney Moorer ===
In June 2013, Elvis took notice of Sidney Moorer, a 37-year-old married resident of Socastee who repaired the kitchen equipment at the Tilted Kilt; she tweeted early that month that she had "a taste for men who're older." Warrelmann, also a coworker at that time, recalled that Elvis pointed Moorer out to her at work. Almost a month later, on her Twitter page, Elvis expressed sexual interest in "the guy who builds things at my job" and expressed a desire to rape him. A July 10 tweet, responding to a friend who had told Elvis she had "a lot of explaining to do", named a "Sidney" as someone she would go out of her way to see; four hours afterward she followed up with "baby did a bad bad thing" and, "I'm in way too deep. But watch me get in deeper".

Friends and coworkers recalled that Elvis also discussed the relationship she was having with them as well. Moorer would often come to the restaurants when he was not working to deliver coffee and bagels to her. He considered asking Elvis to work as his children's nanny should he and his wife move to Florida, as they were considering doing.

Moorer said his affair with Elvis was primarily confined to September 2013. Late that month, Elvis tweeted that, "Once upon a time, an angel and a devil fell in love. It did not end well", which has since been interpreted as referring to the relationship, by then ended. Shortly afterwards, Moorer's wife Tammy found out about the affair and became very angry. According to Warrelmann, Tammy made Sidney call Elvis and end the affair with her listening. Sidney, she says, told Elvis that she was "nothing to me ... just someone who spread your legs". Warrellmann said Sidney "basically tore Heather apart as a human being ... and made her feel horrible about herself." Tammy, who later told a friend that her husband and Elvis had confined their relations to oral sex, also sent the younger woman texts and pictures of herself and Sidney in sexual situations.

To make sure Sidney remained faithful to her, Tammy handcuffed him to the couple's bed every night, changed his phone password to one only she knew and accompanied him whenever he traveled outside the house, he said later. Sidney agreed to all these restrictions in order to save their marriage. Tammy also made Sidney get her name tattooed above his crotch.

However, Tammy continued to contact Elvis, sending threatening texts or implying that she was going to kill her husband. On November 1, Elvis texted back that she was "no one you need to worry about anymore". A text that said "by the way, dad no longer has his phone", presumably referring to Sidney, drew a period in response from Elvis, her only other direct response to the many messages she received from Tammy. Tammy also tried to get Elvis fired from her job at the Tilted Kilt, calling the restaurant regularly and telling them her husband would stop repairing their equipment as long as Elvis continued working there. At one point, Sidney reportedly managed to begin texting Elvis again, telling her that his wife had not objected to the affair itself, since she also had a lover, but to his lying about it. Elvis asked him when he would have his phone back, and he said the relationship was over. She agreed, but said she wanted Tammy to stop calling the Tilted Kilt. "I lost hours today because they sent me home after she kept calling", she wrote at one point.

On November 5, Elvis retweeted a joke by comedian Daniel Tosh that seemed to be indirectly referencing the affair: "hey married fellas, you can either cheat on your wife OR murder her. never both. that's when you get caught." The Moorers and their two children left South Carolina to drive to Disney World for a vacation on November 19. They returned on December 11.

== Disappearance ==
At the time of the Moorers' return, Elvis, according to her friends and family, was moving on from the affair. She had gotten a job at a beauty parlor in Myrtle Beach, starting just before Christmas, which she was eagerly anticipating, and resolved, along with Warrelmann, to begin attending church regularly. However, Elvis had put on weight and coworkers at the Tilted Kilt noted that her uniforms had gone up three bra sizes. She was concerned she had become pregnant, possibly by Sidney. Her manager at the Tilted Kilt said she had taken one pregnancy test, which came back as "error".

On the night of December 17, Elvis went on a first date with another man, Steven Schiraldi. Starting at 10 p.m., he drove her around in his car looking at residential Christmas lights in the area. They later drove to the parking lot of the Inlet Square Mall, where he taught her how to drive his manual transmission vehicle. Elvis sent photos of herself using the stick to her father and to Warrelmann.

Schiraldi dropped Elvis off at her Carolina Forest apartment around 1:15 a.m. EST. He is the last person known to have seen her. Twenty minutes later, a call was placed from a payphone to Elvis' cell phone, lasting five minutes. Shortly afterwards, she called Warrelmann, who was then out of state visiting her family for the holidays. Elvis said that Sidney had called, telling her he was planning to leave his wife, and asked her to meet him. Warrelmann, who described her roommate as "hysterical" during the conversation, counseled her not to do so. After two minutes, the call was ended. Elvis' whereabouts have not been conclusively established beyond 1:45 a.m. on December 18.

== Investigation ==
On the evening of December 19, Elvis' green Dodge Intrepid was found, parked perpendicular to the spaces it was in, at the Peachtree Landing boat launch along the Waccamaw River in Socastee, about eight miles (13 km) from her apartment. The car was locked, and when opened, Elvis' phone, keys and purse were not inside. Calls to her phone went unanswered, and she was not at her apartment nor either of her jobs.

Horry County police began a missing person investigation; Schiraldi, the last person known to have seen Elvis, was quickly cleared. The day after the car was found, a search of the area around the boat landing found no sign of Elvis; later searches of the riverbed down to Winyah Bay by a team of rescue divers from Coastal Carolina University were likewise fruitless. A set of bones discovered in another area nearby around New Year's Day were later found to belong to a male.

=== Cell phone records ===
Investigators were able to obtain Elvis' phone records, which showed considerable activity on the preceding morning over the two hours after she had told Warrelmann that Sidney had called her, although they cannot say whether Elvis was the one using it. Pings showed that at 2:30 a.m., a call had been made from the phone to the payphone that had made the call Elvis said came from Sidney, but no one answered. Shortly afterwards, it was taken to Longbeard's Bar and Grill elsewhere in Carolina Forest, where it remained for 15 minutes.

After the phone left, it was taken as far away as Augusta Plantation Drive (roughly 4 mi (6.4 km) from Longbeard's), whereupon it was returned to Longbeard's for another 15 minutes. At the end of that time period, a call was placed to Sidney's cellphone, but was not answered. Elvis' phone appeared to be in motion, suggesting it had left Longbeard's. Within five minutes it was back at Elvis's apartment and remained there for another five minutes. During that time it called Sidney's phone again, then located at his home, resulting in a four-minute conversation.

At 3:37, about eight minutes after that call ended, the phone was taken to Peachtree Landing. A minute later, three attempts were made to call Sidney's phone within the space of two minutes; all were unanswered. At 3:41, another attempt was made. A minute and a half later, data records for Elvis' phone end; its location could only be identified as somewhere in the Waccamaw National Wildlife Refuge.

Tammy and Sidney's phone records were also examined. There had been no communication between the two via those phones from November 2, the day Sidney would later testify he surrendered his phone to Tammy as a condition of remaining married, until 3:37 a.m. December 18, when she sent him a text asking for "the pot stickers and orange juice". "Yes ma'am" he replied immediately afterwards.

=== Security camera footage ===
Police found video evidence further linking Sidney with Elvis's activities in the early hours of December 18. Surveillance video from a Myrtle Beach Walmart showed that at 1:12 a.m. that night, Sidney entered the store, purchased cigars and a pregnancy test, and left after seven minutes. Footage from a Kangaroo gas station on Joe White Avenue showed Sidney making the call from the payphone across the street to Elvis's cellphone at 1:35 a.m.

Investigators also reviewed footage from private security cameras along the three miles (5 km) between the Moorers' house and Peachtree Landing. Two – one at a home midway along the route and another closer to the landing – showed a dark Ford F-150 passing, in the direction of the landing, at 3:36 and 3:39 a.m. respectively. At 3:45 and 3:46, the vehicle returns going the opposite direction. Its license plate is not visible; however, after analysis and enhancement of the video by both the South Carolina Highway Patrol's accident investigation unit and the FBI, it was determined to be Sidney's and subsequently searched.

== Arrests and charges ==
The first two arrests related to the case were not the Moorers, or anyone else suspected of involvement in Elvis' disappearance. On January 28, 2014, William Christopher Barrett and Garrett Ryan Starnes were arrested and charged with obstruction of justice. Police said both men had posted information on social media about the case that was either false or misleading, and that investigators had wasted time being diverted from the case when they looked into the posts. Both were released after posting bond; the charge against Starnes was dismissed in April when the charging officer missed the preliminary hearing because he mistakenly believed the case had been continued. Starnes was indicted on the charge in July.

Twice during February, Sidney told police that people had fired at him or brandished weapons while he was driving on local roads with his family due to publicity over his possible role in Elvis' disappearance. In the former incident, Georgetown County deputy sheriffs who responded saw no signs that his truck had been hit despite Sidney's claim that he had heard bullets strike it. Sidney claimed later that in addition to those incidents, he had been followed and received threats against himself and his home, and the family's pets had been killed and mutilated. Later, he posted signs outside the family home lamenting the threats and the impact they had had on his children; some of them, he said, had been directed by name.

On February 21, police closed off the section of South Carolina Highway 814 next to the Moorer residence to execute a search warrant for the property. After 11 hours in which law enforcement searched thoroughly, the Moorers were both arrested at home and charged with murder, kidnapping, obstruction of justice and two counts each of indecent exposure. The latter charge resulted from sexually explicit images found on their phones that they were determined to have taken of themselves in public places. The obstruction charges against Sidney were later specified as resulting from his early denial of his use of the payphone, a claim he reportedly retracted only when confronted with the security camera footage from the gas station showing him making the call. At a news conference announcing the arrests, police did not go into detail about what evidence supported the murder and kidnapping charges.

The Moorers posted the $20,000 bond set for the obstruction and exposure charges but later waived the bond on the kidnapping charges in favor of the murder charges, on which they were initially held without bond. A month after the arrests, the court imposed a gag order on all participants in the case. Investigators also announced that they would later be making additional charges unrelated to the Elvis case that instead involved "financial discrepancies filed with the State of South Carolina on behalf of the occupants of the residence". In June these charges were formally filed as related to Medicaid fraud; investigators said that on a 2007 application for benefits that exceeded $10,000 the Moorers had failed to disclose the income from their businesses.

In the wake of the arrests, the Moorers drew heavy support on social media. Tammy and Sidney had disparaged Elvis as a stalker beforehand on various sites, particularly their Facebook pages, suggesting the police had framed them and were protecting the real killers. The Elvis family tried to fight back but felt overwhelmed. At one point, they barred a local newspaper that had repeated allegations against them in its coverage from a news conference they held discussing the online harassment.

In early 2015, the Moorers were released from jail, where they had been held for the preceding 11 months, after a judge accepted Tammy's mother's house as collateral sufficient to guarantee the $100,000 bond on the murder charges. At the bond hearing, prosecutors told the court they still had no direct evidence linking the couple to Elvis's disappearance. The Elvis family argued against the release, claiming they had received threats from the Moorer family and their supporters. The court required Sidney and Tammy to agree to GPS monitoring of their whereabouts, to stay 5 miles (8.0 km) away from the Elvis family home at all times and to avoid interacting with any of them on Facebook or other social media.

Due to the continuing threats against Sidney and Tammy and their difficulties finding work in Horry County, in September, the court allowed the Moorers to move to Florida, where Sidney had found a job, while the case was still pending. They were required to continue to meet their bail conditions and waive extradition from Florida should they violate them.

In March 2016, prosecutors dropped the murder charges against both Sidney and Tammy; without prejudice, the charges could be reinstated later should the state decide. The indecent exposure charges were dropped as well, along with the obstruction charge against Tammy. The charges related to the alleged Medicaid fraud remained. The Elvises said that while they were disappointed, they understood that prosecutors had to make decisions and hoped that further investigations and trials on the outstanding charges would eventually lead to them finding out what had happened to their daughter.

== Trials ==
There have been three trials so far related to the case.

=== Mistrial ===
In June 2016, the first trial in relation to Elvis' disappearance took place when a jury was seated to decide whether Sidney had kidnapped her. Over the next four days the state presented its case. Elvis's coworkers testified that she had had an affair with Sidney and that they, along with Elvis herself, believed she had gotten pregnant as a result. Law enforcement specialists documented the phone and video records that prosecutors argued connected Sidney to Elvis the morning she disappeared. The jurors were also taken to see both Peachtree Landing and the Moorers' house.

The last day of the trial was taken up by Warrelmann's testimony. She described the affair between Elvis and Sidney in greater detail and became upset recalling her last conversation with her roommate. On cross-examination, the defense asked her about some times Elvis had had difficulties with her family, and a reportedly-abusive former boyfriend who Elvis had dated prior to meeting Sidney. After the judge rejected the defense motion for a directed verdict of not guilty, Sidney's attorney Kirk Truslow rested his case, making his closing argument to the jury that the case against his client was entirely circumstantial and had only proved that he and Elvis had had an affair.

After deliberating for seven hours, the jury informed the judge that they were irreconcilably divided. Ten of them wanted to convict, but two did not. Due to this hung jury, the judge declared a mistrial. As of December 2018, a new date for that trial has not been set; Sidney's motion for a change of venue was granted, so when he is retried it will be in neighboring Georgetown County.

On the trial's second day, Sidney spoke to a media outlet about the case. After the trial, the judge found him in contempt of court for violating the gag order and sentenced him to five months in jail. He was released after two due to good behavior. Upon release he spoke again to the media, saying he felt the jury in the trial had not been impartial and that the whole case amounted to "malicious prosecution."

=== Obstruction of justice ===
Court proceedings related to the case resumed over a year later. In late July 2017 a hearing was held to determine whether Tammy had violated the gag order and should be charged with contempt of court. Neither the circumstances that necessitated the hearing, nor its disposition, were made public. Sidney was tried on the obstruction charge, a rare instance of that charge actually reaching that stage in South Carolina, shortly afterwards.

The case again focused on the cell phone records and video from the morning Elvis disappeared, as the prosecution attempted to prove to the jury that Sidney's initial denial that he had made the payphone call to Elvis, only to admit to it when confronted by the video evidence, hindered the progress of the investigation. A cousin of Tammy's also testified that at some point after the disappearance Sidney had shown him something on his phone which indicated that he had known more about the case than he had told police at that point, but did not elaborate in court as to what Sidney had shown him. In a Dateline episode that aired in March 2021, prosecutors revealed that Tammy's cousin was referring to a photograph of Heather in which she appeared to be clearly deceased, with blood on her shirt and scratches on her face.

After three days, Sidney was convicted. The judge sentenced him to ten years in prison, the maximum for the offense, with credit for nearly a year of time served over a year earlier. Truslow said he would appeal, since as the offense is largely a matter of common law in South Carolina rather than statutorily defined, he felt it was so vague and overbroad as to be unconstitutional when applied to his client in this case. "I also believe it is obvious that much more of the trial had to do with the underlying allegations", he said. While Sidney had indeed lied to the police, he claimed it did not seriously hinder their investigation, and accused prosecutors of "just trying to put somebody away, just so [they] can say [they] put somebody away?"

In April 2018, a grand jury indicted Sidney and Tammy on a single count of conspiracy to kidnap, the first time in the case charges had been brought that way. Prosecutors would not elaborate on the specifics of the charges, citing the standing gag order, but commentators believed the indictment, and especially the additional charge, suggested that either new evidence had been found or one of them had agreed to testify against the other. "[T]he only way you're gonna get a conspiracy conviction is if the co-conspirator comes forward", said one. Failing that, the goal might have been to put pressure on them both to do so.

In 2019, shortly after Sidney was convicted of kidnapping, he appealed the obstruction conviction, arguing his motion for a directed verdict should have been granted because the evidence was insufficient. The conviction was sustained; he appealed that decision to the South Carolina Supreme Court, which upheld the lower courts.

=== Kidnapping and conspiracy ===
In October 2018, almost five years after Elvis's disappearance, Tammy went on trial, drawing national media attention. In addition to the documentary evidence that had been introduced in Sidney's trial, the prosecution introduced the threatening text messages she had sent Elvis to support the state's theory that Tammy had been driven into a jealous rage when she knew of Elvis' possible pregnancy, giving her a motive to hurt her. Shortly after the disappearance, Tammy had called Elvis a "psycho whore" in a Facebook post and suggested that the younger woman had been stalking her and her children. Sidney's mother testified that a few days after learning of the affair, Tammy beat her husband severely.

Sexually explicit texts Tammy had sent to her lover were also introduced, prompting the defense to move for a mistrial since, they argued, they were so prejudicial to her character that a jury could be moved to convict her from them despite what they considered to be minimal relevance to the charges she faced. But, her attorneys pointed out, in the same message she had also said the affair itself had not bothered her, since she had herself taken a lover; rather it was Elvis stalking the family that upset her. In a police interview played for the jury, Tammy claimed to have had an open marriage. When she herself took the stand later in the trial, she said she had actually had a "nice conversation" with Elvis the month before her disappearance and resolved any issues the two had.

However, a detective who interviewed Tammy recalled that she had characterized Sidney's relationship with Elvis as inconsequential. She showed Tammy a hotel room key found in Elvis's car, as well as a receipt indicating Sidney had paid for the room, suggesting it had been somewhat more serious. Prosecutors brought this up on cross-examination, as well as eliciting from Tammy an admission that she and Sidney were now legally separated due to her disappointment over him not having taken the stand in his own defense during either of his trials. Tammy's lawyers responded that her only response to learning that Sidney's liaison with Elvis had included a hotel room stay was to take a photograph of the receipt with her phone.

Tammy's defense had to change its presentation before presenting any witnesses after five of them—her children, mother, and another who had not been identified—were accused of violating a sequestration order forbidding them from watching live coverage of the trial. A deputy sheriff testified in a hearing that he had seen them watching news coverage on a laptop while waiting to testify; although the Moorers' son denied it, the judge ruled that they had and barred the defense from presenting them. After a recess, the defense thus began its case with Tammy's sister Ashley Caison, who disputed several aspects of the prosecution case.

Caison testified that Sidney had gotten his tattoo in January 2012, long before he had met Elvis, and that she could prove this with texts between herself and the tattooist's wife. She also said that Tammy did not handcuff Sidney to the bed, only that they liked to use the cuffs for sexual roleplaying, in which capacity she would sometimes handcuff him to the bed. On cross-examination, the prosecution confronted her with her police interview, where she had said otherwise. The defense also elicited from Caison some testimony about the events of the night Elvis disappeared. While Caison had been watching the Moorer children until 3 a.m., she said this was not an unusual occurrence since the children were homeschooled and often stayed up late. Tammy had texted her at 3:10 a.m. that she and Sidney were home, whereupon the children walked back there.

Sydney Moffitt, a former roommate of Elvis', testified about her abusive previous boyfriend, and recounted an incident in 2012 where Elvis returned from work with bruises on her neck that she did not explain; however, she said on cross-examination that she had not had much contact with Elvis since that year. Two men who knew Elvis testified: one said that he had had a sexual relationship with her but offered no other details, and the other that he had possibly seen her at a bar in Murrells Inlet the night of December 20. However, he admitted on cross-examination that it could not have been her since security camera footage of the encounter showed that the woman did not have Elvis's distinctive tattoos.

On the stand, Tammy threw further doubt on the handcuffing claim, saying that the couple at that time slept in a sleigh bed and thus there was no way that anyone in it could be handcuffed to it. While she had initially been angry when she learned of Sidney's affair, she got over it within a few days and was past it after returning from the trip to Disneyland. On the night of Elvis's disappearance, she said, she and Sidney had gone out to have sex in his truck and buy the pregnancy test, since they had been trying to have another child and she had miscarried while in jail; the test came back negative. After returning to the house at 3:10 a.m, Tammy did not go right to bed since she still had work to do around the house after returning from a long vacation. However, she said that shortly afterwards it had been Sidney who took the call from Elvis on his phone, but stayed home after that.

The attorneys reiterated their themes in their closing arguments. The prosecutor, drawing on the Moorers' love for Disney movies and parks, likened the defendant to the Evil Queen in Snow White and the Seven Dwarfs: "When you mix jealousy, deceit and just an absolute crazed woman so worried about [Elvis] stealing her husband, that is when unnatural things happen." In turn, Tammy's lawyer brought up reasonable doubt, suggesting that there was no way the Moorers could have made Elvis disappear without a trace in the 55 minutes between the end of her cell phone activity and Tammy's text to her husband about the pot stickers.

After the 11-day trial, the jury convicted Tammy of both charges following four hours of deliberations. She was sentenced to 30 years for each, to run concurrently, with credit for time served. Shortly afterwards, Tammy said she would be appealing the verdict since it was based entirely on circumstantial evidence, with different lawyers representing her.

The day after the trial ended, Terry Elvis, Heather's father, appeared in court to face a contempt charge. One of Tammy's lawyers, Casey Moore, alleged that on the first day of the trial, Terry had yelled obscenities and insults at him as they met at the bathroom, violating the court's injunction not to have any verbal contact with the Moorers or their attorneys. Through his own lawyer, Terry admitted the contact but denied being verbally abusive. He insisted in his defense that Moore had used the bathroom on the side of the courthouse that was supposed to be used by the Elvises. The court found him guilty and fined him $400, which he said he would pay even though the Elvis family felt the charge was misguided, since the case had lasted so long.

In September of 2019, Sidney Moorer was also found guilty of kidnapping Heather Elvis, and sentenced to 30 years.

== Appeals ==
Tammy's appeal was heard in late 2021. She argued that the judge's decision to bar family members who were ready to testify in support of her alibi from the witness stand after they had reportedly been following the trial on livestream before being called to testify, in apparent defiance of the sequestration order, denied her a fair trial. She also argued that the testimony of the state's expert witness who identified Sidney's truck on video leaving Peachtree Landing, based upon the vehicle's headlights, was subjective and unscientific and should not have been admitted. Lastly she said the explicit text messages between her and Sidney should also have been excluded as irrelevant and prejudicial. Sidney Moorer also appealed, arguing that he was denied a fair trial by the decision to hold his second kidnapping trial in Horry County, that there was insufficient evidence for a conviction, and that the expert testimony linking his truck to the crime scene should have been barred as inadmissible. Both Moorers had their appeals denied by the South Carolina Court of Appeals in June 2023, with the court holding that there was no evidence their trials were prejudiced by social media, that there was substantial evidence pointing to their responsibility for Elvis' disappearance, that the expert testimony about Sidney's truck was fairly admitted, and that the text messages did not substantially affect Tammy's trial. The Moorers then requested that the South Carolina Supreme Court review the decision, but the court denied both their requests. Tammy Moorer's projected release date is currently May 9, 2043, whereas Sidney Moorer is projected for release on March 31, 2044.

In 2025 Sidney, on his own behalf, filed a motion for a new trial. He asked that it be held in a different jurisdiction from Horry County, alleging that evidence existed that would prove jury intimidation and that the county clerk of courts was a relative of Elvis's. He further alleged that the state had allowed witnesses to perjure themselves and withheld DNA evidence pointing to a different suspect. Sidney also claimed ineffective assistance of counsel.

== See also ==
- Crime in South Carolina
- Murder of Brittanee Drexel, 2009 disappearance in Myrtle Beach where arrest on murder charge was made in 2022
- List of kidnappings
- List of people who disappeared mysteriously: post-1970
