= Murder of Brittanee Drexel =

2009 murder of American teen

- Image of Drexel distributed after her disappearance
- Date: April 25, 2009; 17 years ago
- Location: Georgetown, South Carolina, U.S.
- Type: Murder by strangulation, abduction, sexual abuse
- Deaths: Brittanee Drexel
- Convicted: Raymond Moody
- Verdict: Pleaded guilty
- Convictions: Murder; Kidnapping; First-degree criminal sexual misconduct
- Sentence: Life imprisonment without the possibility of parole plus 60 years

On the night of April 25, 2009, 17-year-old Brittanee Drexel of Chili, New York, United States, left a hotel in Myrtle Beach, South Carolina, where she had been staying with friends over spring break. Drexel walked to another hotel a short distance away, and from there, texted her boyfriend to say that she was heading back to her hotel. It was the last time she was known to be alive.

Police investigated Drexel's disappearance but no developments were made public until 2016, when it was announced that a prison inmate had told them that she had been abducted and killed. The man accused by the informant denied knowledge of any alleged crime. Based on that information, the FBI considered the case a homicide.

In May 2022, police arrested Raymond Moody, a registered sex offender in the area, on charges of murder, kidnapping, and first-degree criminal sexual conduct; he pleaded guilty to all charges in October. Drexel's skeletal remains were recovered a week later in a wooded area in Georgetown, about 33 mi (53 km) from where she originally went missing.

== Background ==
Brittanee Drexel was born in Rochester, New York, on October 7, 1991, to John Kahyaoglu, who was of Turkish descent, and her mother Dawn. The two were teens and not married. Shortly after Brittanee was born, Dawn married Chad Drexel, who adopted her at that time. After Chad's military service ended, the family lived in the Rochester suburb of Chili.

Drexel was born with persistent hyperplastic primary vitreous in her right eye, which required several surgeries and rendered the eye blind. To cover the eye's tendency to wander, she wore contact lenses that gave her a distinctive appearance.

In April 2009, Drexel asked her mother if she could go to Myrtle Beach, South Carolina, over spring break with some friends. Her mother refused, since she did not know the other teenagers and there were no accompanying adults on the trip; she also had a premonition that something bad would happen. This led to arguments between the two for several days until April 22, when Drexel asked if she could go to a friend's house for a day or two to calm down, to which Dawn agreed. That day, Drexel left for South Carolina with the other students without telling her mother.

Three days later, after she and her group had arrived at the Bar Harbor Hotel in Myrtle Beach, Drexel called her mother once during the daytime and told her that she was at the beach. Her mother was not alarmed, as she assumed that Drexel had been referring to a beach along the Lake Ontario shoreline. A trip there seemed plausible to her since the temperature in the Rochester area had reached an unseasonable high of 83 °F (28 °C) in the area that day.

== Disappearance ==
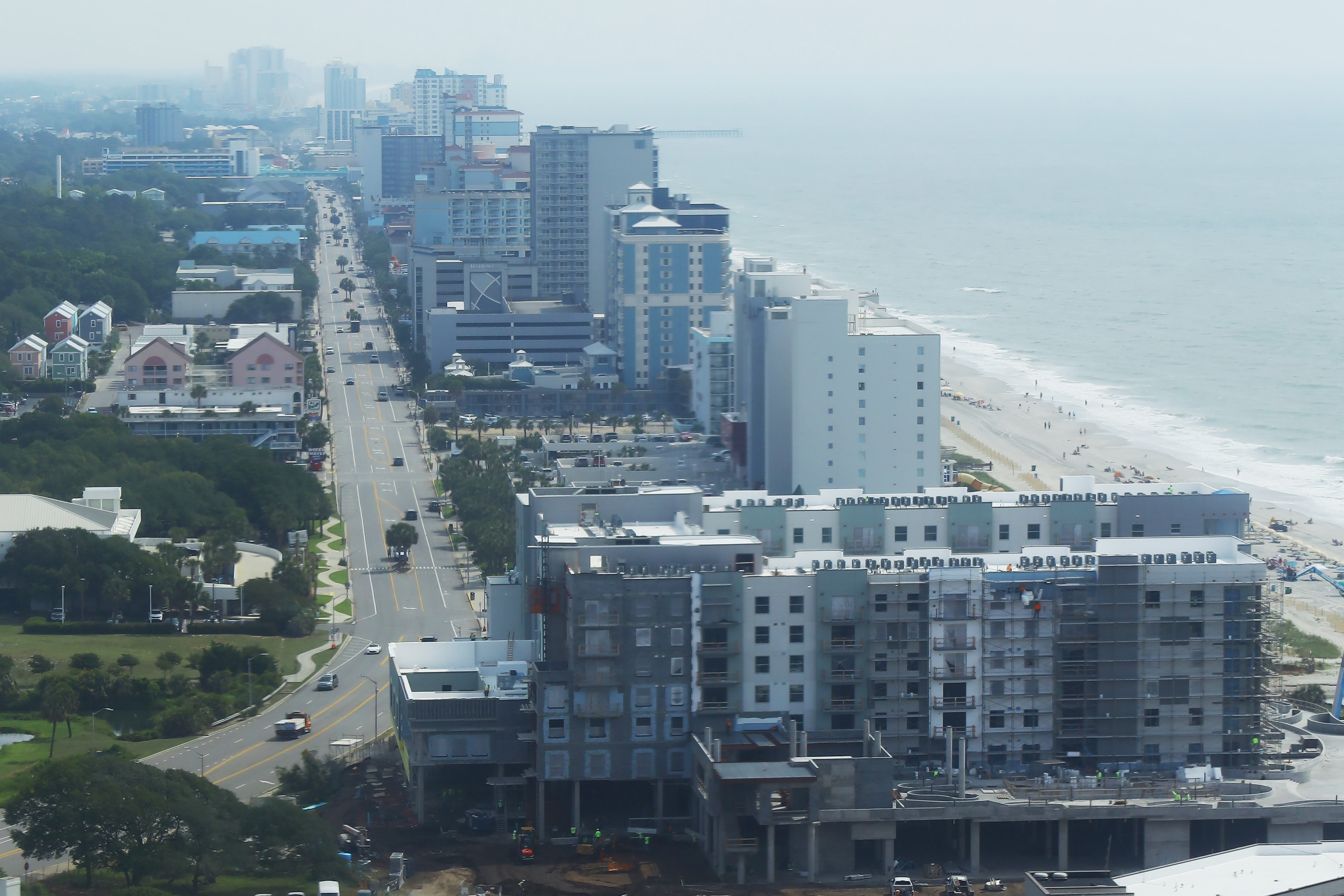
Drexel walked down South Ocean Boulevard to visit a friend at the Blue Water Resort.

That night, around 8 p.m., Drexel left her friends at the Bar Harbor Hotel beachfront to walk 1.5 miles (2.4 km) south down South Ocean Boulevard to visit a longtime friend who was staying at the Blue Water Resort. Security cameras at the resort showed her arriving. Drexel was carrying a beige purse and wearing a black-and-white tank top, flip-flops and shorts. The cameras captured her leaving around 8:45 p.m.

Drexel was texting her boyfriend, John Grieco, who had stayed in the Rochester area because of work commitments. They had been texting back and forth, but around 9:15 p.m. her texts suddenly stopped and Grieco began calling her friends in Myrtle Beach to see if they knew where she was or what had happened.

When those efforts failed, Grieco called Drexel's mother Dawn, who had not known that her daughter was in Myrtle Beach until she was contacted. Dawn called Chad and then the Rochester police, hoping that they could establish communications with their counterparts in South Carolina. Repeated calls and texts to Drexel's phone went unanswered.

== Investigation ==
Myrtle Beach police began looking for Drexel the following morning. They located the security camera footage from the Blue Water Resort and found the friends she had visited. The last person who had reported seeing Drexel before she had left was identified as Peter Brozowitz, a 20-year-old nightclub promoter she had known from the Rochester area and who was also vacationing in Myrtle Beach. They had apparently met at a local nightclub the night before. After police interviewed Brozowitz and the men with whom he was sharing his hotel room, they said that "no one has been ruled in or out," adding that they did not have any persons of interest.

Police searched Drexel's hotel room, finding all of the clothes she had packed, but not her purse or cell phone. The phone's network pings were tracked on a path leading 50–60 miles (80–97 km) south of Myrtle Beach, in an area along U.S. Route 17 near the Georgetown–Charleston county line. The pings had stopped abruptly early on the morning of April 26, the day after her disappearance. Areas near there and around Myrtle Beach where a body might have been disposed of were then searched for eleven days. In 2011, police searched an apartment in Georgetown County, but that effort did not yield any information that helped identify a suspect.

Dawn and Brozowitz had several confrontations on the television show Dr. Phil, during which Brozowitz often expressed frustration at the damage to his reputation. Dawn, who had driven to Myrtle Beach the day after her daughter's disappearance, eventually relocated there permanently to be close to where Drexel had last been seen and to better monitor the progress of the investigation. In a 2014 newspaper article on the case's fifth anniversary, she expressed her theory that Drexel had defied her to go to Myrtle Beach because she had been "promised something" of interest, such as a modeling job.

Dawn believed that her daughter had been trafficked, but the Myrtle Beach police did not believe this was a strong possibility due to their claim of little or no trafficking taking place in their jurisdiction. A 2019 report conducted by the South Carolina Human Trafficking task force rated Horry County as the number one county in South Carolina for reported human trafficking victims.

== Timothy Taylor allegations ==
In June 2016 the FBI held a news conference during which they stated that they believed that Drexel had been murdered shortly after her disappearance. She had been abducted from Myrtle Beach and taken somewhere in the vicinity of Georgetown, near where the cell phone pings had ended, before being killed there. The Bureau put up a $25,000 reward for information leading to the resolution of the case.

Two months later, the Charleston Post and Courier reported new developments from a bond hearing for Timothy Da'Shaun Taylor, an inmate then serving time in state prison on an unrelated charge. FBI agent Gerrick Muñoz testified that earlier that year Taquan Brown, another South Carolina inmate who had begun serving a 25-year sentence for manslaughter, told them that in 2009, shortly after Drexel disappeared, he had gone to visit a McClellanville "stash house" to give money to Taylor's father.

As he walked through the house, Brown had told Muñoz, he saw Taylor sexually assaulting Drexel with others present. He continued to the backyard, where he found Taylor's father and made his payment. As they talked, Drexel ran from the house but was soon recaptured. Brown said he saw Taylor pistol-whip Drexel, then take her back inside. He then heard two gunshots, which he assumed were the sounds of the young woman being killed. Brown claims to have seen a wrapped body being removed from the house, then dumped in one of many alligator ponds in the area.

Brown's statement to investigators, Muñoz said, was partially corroborated by information received from another informant who was not identified but was described as having been incarcerated at the Georgetown County jail at the time he had talked to authorities. According to the second inmate, Taylor had picked up Drexel in Myrtle Beach and taken her to McClellanville, where he showed her off to friends and tried to sell her to them for trafficking purposes. Brown said that when the case drew heavy media attention Taylor decided to kill Drexel to avoid arrest.

=== Federal charges ===
The bond hearing had been held after Taylor's arrest on a federal indictment for interfering in interstate commerce by threat or violence, a charge stemming from his role as the getaway driver in a 2011 robbery of a McDonald's restaurant in Mount Pleasant. Unusually, Taylor had already been convicted for his involvement in the crime in state court and had been sentenced to probation, which he had finished by the time of the federal charges. Taylor's lawyer called the new charge a "squeeze" based on nothing more than the statement of two jailed informants; his mother called them "craziness," since she believed that her son and husband could never commit such a crime.

Winston Holliday, the federal prosecutor at the hearing, admitted to the judge that the suspicions in the Drexel case were among the government's reasons for having brought the new charge for the conduct South Carolina had already sentenced Taylor for. In response to questions of whether this amounted to double jeopardy, Holliday cited a federal law that states that the federal government may bring charges for a crime if it believes the state prosecution led to an unfair outcome. In this case, Holliday noted that the other two participants in the robbery had both been sentenced to prison, with the gunman, who shot the restaurant's cashier twice, serving a 25-year minimum term.

In June 2017, as part of his plea bargain negotiations, Taylor took a polygraph test. Some answers to the polygraph were labeled "deceptive" by the FBI. According to the federal government's sentencing memorandum the only possible knowledge of the case to which Taylor admitted involved having overheard part of an argument between two people over who had Drexel's cell phone, a discussion that he said had made him suspicious. But when Taylor was connected to the polygraph and asked whether he had seen Drexel after her disappearance, or if he knew who was involved, the examiner determined he was not being truthful. Under the plea bargain he would thus face at least ten years in prison for his role in the 2011 robbery. After reviewing the results with Taylor's lawyer, the examiner attempted to continue but Taylor was too angry to do so. The government's memo recommended the minimum sentence.

Before the sentencing hearing was scheduled, Taylor was found to have violated the terms of his bail and was held in Charleston County jail. In August, presiding federal district judge David C. Norton ordered his bail reinstated on the condition that he remain on house arrest until the U.S. Supreme Court decided the case of Gamble v. United States, a constitutional challenge to the dual sovereignty doctrine, which allows separate state and federal prosecutions for the same criminal offense. The development pleased activists who had been attempting to draw national attention to what they considered to be a "witch hunt."

In June 2019, the Supreme Court decided Gamble in favor of the government, upholding dual sovereignty and allowing the federal government to proceed with its case against Taylor. Six months later, Norton sentenced Taylor to time served, 319 days, after a guilty plea forced by his similar disposition in state court. Taylor filed suit against the FBI on March 25, 2024.

=== 2019 interview ===
In February 2019, Brown gave a telephone interview to Rochester station WHEC-TV from McCormick Correctional Institution, where he was incarcerated. He said he had actually seen Drexel four times after her disappearance. In addition to the first encounter, Brown said he had seen her again a month later, and it was at that time she was killed.

Brown claimed he saw Drexel being sexually assaulted by a group of eight to twelve young men at the McClellanville stash house on April 27, two days after her disappearance. He did not recognize her at the time but realized who she was a month later when publicity arose surrounding the case. His second encounter with Drexel came a few days later; this was the event that he had described to the FBI with the gunshots inside the building, and the body being carried out in a rug. Brown claimed his third encounter was five days later when he saw Drexel on a lightly traveled dirt road near his cousin's residence in Jacksonboro, 80 miles (130 km) south of McClellanville. Brown claimed to have seen Drexel for the last time in late May, once again on his cousin's property, while visiting with another friend. In a wooded area at the rear of the property, Brown claimed to have witnessed Drexel being murdered by a man Brown knew only as "Nate," who shot her twice with a double-barreled shotgun. Brown and his friend left immediately, fearing being considered as accomplices if they had remained.

WHEC was able to partially corroborate Brown's account. His description of the McClellanville stash house matched the station's own reporting from a 2016 visit. His account of the second visit, when he believed Drexel had been shot, is consistent with his original story as told to the FBI. The station was unable to locate the friend Brown said had accompanied him on the last visit. The cousin who owned the property where Drexel was purportedly killed had since died. Another witness Brown had named could not be found.

Brown filed suit against Muñoz, Holliday and other federal officials he said had identified him publicly or played a role in doing so. By doing so, he alleged, they gave him a reputation as a "snitch" and put his life in danger. Brown claimed that Taylor offered a bounty to anyone who killed Brown and that he had already been assaulted.

== Arrest and guilty plea ==
In early May 2022, Raymond Moody, a 62-year-old registered sex offender, turned himself in to the Georgetown County Sheriff's Office on the basis of an obstruction of justice charge. Police had first considered Moody a person of interest in Drexel's disappearance as early as 2012.

Moody confessed to the crime after turning himself in, and provided the location of potential remains. The FBI excavated the site over the next three days. By May 11, human remains were located, buried in the woods off a gated private drive outside Georgetown, about four feet into the ground; they were identified as Drexel's through DNA and dental records on May 15.

The arrest warrant alleged that Drexel had been strangled and then buried by the morning of April 26, 2009. Georgetown County Sheriff's Office, along with Drexel's family, made the information public on May 16, along with the announcement of Moody's arrest. Moody was arrested again and charged with murder, kidnapping and first-degree criminal sexual misconduct, all alleged to have occurred on the day Drexel disappeared. On October 19, Moody pleaded guilty to all charges and was subsequently sentenced to life in prison with an additional two consecutive terms of 30 years. Moody's girlfriend Angel Vause first claimed she was not with Moody at the time of the crime. But later, she said and Moody had approached Drexel with an offer to smoke marijuana which Drexel accepted, though once Drexel was in their car Moody forcefully abducted her.

In March 2024, Moody's girlfriend, Angel Vause, was arrested on three federal charges for lying to the FBI regarding her whereabouts on the night of Drexel's disappearance. In September, Vause pleaded guilty to all counts. She was sentenced to 18 years in prison on February 13, 2025.

== See also ==
- Crime in South Carolina
- Disappearance of Heather Elvis, 2013 case in Myrtle Beach where foul play is also suspected
- List of Disappeared episodes
- List of solved missing person cases (post-2000)
- Murder of Jerry Michael Williams, 2000 case in Florida where absence of victim's body was initially explained as resulting from consumption by alligators
