= Andy Warhol Foundation for the Visual Arts =

American nonprofit organization

- Formation: 1987
- Founder: Andy Warhol
- Type: Nonprofit organization
- Headquarters: New York City, U.S.
- Key people: Joel Wachs (president)
- Website: warholfoundation.org

The Andy Warhol Foundation for the Visual Arts is an American nonprofit organization established in 1987 following the death of Pop artist Andy Warhol. Created in accordance with Warhol's will, the foundation serves as the artist's estate and supports contemporary visual arts through grants, exhibitions, publications, and other initiatives focused on experimental and innovative artistic expression.

The foundation is among the largest grant-giving organizations for the visual arts in the United States. It also oversees the publication of the Andy Warhol Catalogue Raisonné and has donated thousands of works by Warhol to the Andy Warhol Museum in Pittsburgh.

== History ==
Andy Warhol's will stipulated that his entire estate, aside from modest bequests to his business manager, Fred Hughes, and two brothers, John Warhola and Paul Warhola, be used to establish a foundation dedicated to the visual arts. Following his death in February 1987, the Andy Warhol Foundation for the Visual Arts was formally established to administer Warhol's estate and advance its mission of fostering innovative artistic expression and the creative process, particularly challenging and experimental work.

In 1988, Sotheby's auctioned contents from the collection of Andy Warhol over a 10-day period, generating approximately $25.3 million for the foundation.

The Andy Warhol Foundation provides grants and support to museums, arts organizations, curators, and artists throughout the United States and internationally. It is considered one of the largest private funders of contemporary visual art in the United States.

In 2007, the foundation marked its 20th anniversary with the publication of a three-volume annual report documenting its history, grants, exhibitions, and legacy programs: Vol. I, 1987–2007; Vol. II, Grants & Exhibitions; and Vol. III, Legacy Program.

The foundation has donated more than 3,000 works of art and archival materials to the Andy Warhol Museum in Pittsburgh, which houses the largest collection of Warhol's art and archives.

== Catalogue raisonnés ==
The Andy Warhol Foundation oversees publication of The Andy Warhol Catalogue Raisonné: Paintings, Sculptures, and Drawings, a multi-volume scholarly catalogue documenting Warhol's paintings and sculptures. The project was initiated in 1977 by Swiss art dealer Thomas Ammann while Warhol was still alive. After Ammann's death in 1993, his sister Doris Ammann continued the project in collaboration with the Andy Warhol Foundation and Phaidon Press, resulting in the publication of Paintings and Sculptures 1961–1963 in 2002 and Paintings and Sculptures 1964–1969 in 2004. Since then, the foundation has assumed full stewardship of the catalogue and continued publishing subsequent volumes with Phaidon. The sixth volume was published in 2024, with a seventh in preparation and three additional volumes on Warhol's 1980s work planned.

List of volumes:

- Volume 1: Paintings and Sculpture 1961-1963
- Volume 2: Paintings and Sculptures 1964-1969
- Volume 3: Paintings and Sculptures 1970-1974
- Volume 4: Paintings late 1974-1976
- Volume 5: Paintings 1976-1978
- Volume 6: Paintings and Sculptures mid-1977-1980
- Volume 7: Paintings late 1979-1981

The foundation has also provided significant financial support for several major Warhol reference publications, including Andy Warhol Prints: A Catalogue Raisonné 1962–1987 (2003), Andy Warhol Screen Tests: The Films of Andy Warhol Catalogue Raisonné, Volume 1 (2006), and The Films of Andy Warhol Catalogue Raisonné: Volume 2, 1963–1965 (2021).

== Authentication ==
In 1995, the foundation established the Andy Warhol Art Authentication Board, an advisory board created to evaluate and determine the authenticity of works attributed to Warhol. The board costed around $500,000 each year to run. In 2010, the board pent nearly $7 million defending an antitrust lawsuit brought by collector Joe Simon-Whelan. In 2012, the board was dissolved. Foundation president Joel Wachs stated that the decision would allow the organization to focus its resources on supporting artists rather than legal disputes.

In 2026, former Miami art dealer Leslie Howard Roberts pleaded guilty to conspiracy to commit wire fraud after admitting to selling counterfeit artworks as authentic works by Warhol. Roberts told buyers that he had obtained genuine Warhol works directly from the Andy Warhol Foundation for the Visual Arts and used forged authentication documents, fabricated identification numbers, and counterfeit stamps. Through his Miami Fine Art Gallery, Roberts obtained approximately $2.58 million from the sales. He was sentenced to 46 months in federal prison and ordered to forfeit the proceeds.

== Copyright and image rights ==
The Artists Rights Society serves as the United States copyright representative for the Andy Warhol Foundation for most works by Warhol. Rights for Warhol film stills are administered by the Andy Warhol Museum.

The foundation has also entered into agreements governing Warhol image licensing and archival materials. Digital images of Warhol have been managed through agreements with Corbis, while transparency images have been managed by Art Resource.

== Andy Warhol Foundation for the Visual Arts, Inc. v. Goldsmith ==
The Andy Warhol Foundation was involved in the United States Supreme Court case Andy Warhol Foundation for the Visual Arts, Inc. v. Goldsmith, which concerned the doctrine of fair use in copyright law. The dispute arose from Warhol's 1984 silkscreen portraits of musician Prince, which were based on a 1981 photograph taken by photographer Lynn Goldsmith.

After Prince died in 2016, the foundation licensed one of Warhol's Prince images to Vanity Fair for a commemorative magazine cover. Goldsmith subsequently argued that the use infringed upon her copyright. The foundation filed a preemptive lawsuit seeking a declaratory judgment that Warhol's works constituted fair use, while Goldsmith countersued for copyright infringement.

In 2019, the United States District Court for the Southern District of New York ruled in favor of the foundation, finding that Warhol's works were transformative and constituted fair use. The decision was reversed in 2021 by the United States Court of Appeals for the Second Circuit, which held that the works were not sufficiently transformative to qualify for fair use protection.

On May 18, 2023, the Supreme Court ruled 7–2 against the foundation, holding that the commercial licensing of Warhol's image to a magazine did not qualify as fair use because it shared substantially the same commercial purpose as Goldsmith's original photograph. The decision was widely regarded as a significant ruling affecting appropriation art and the application of fair use in contemporary art practice.

== See also ==
- Andy Warhol Museum
- Andy Warhol Art Authentication Board
- Artists Rights Society
