= Georges Clairin =

French painter and illustrator (1843–1919)

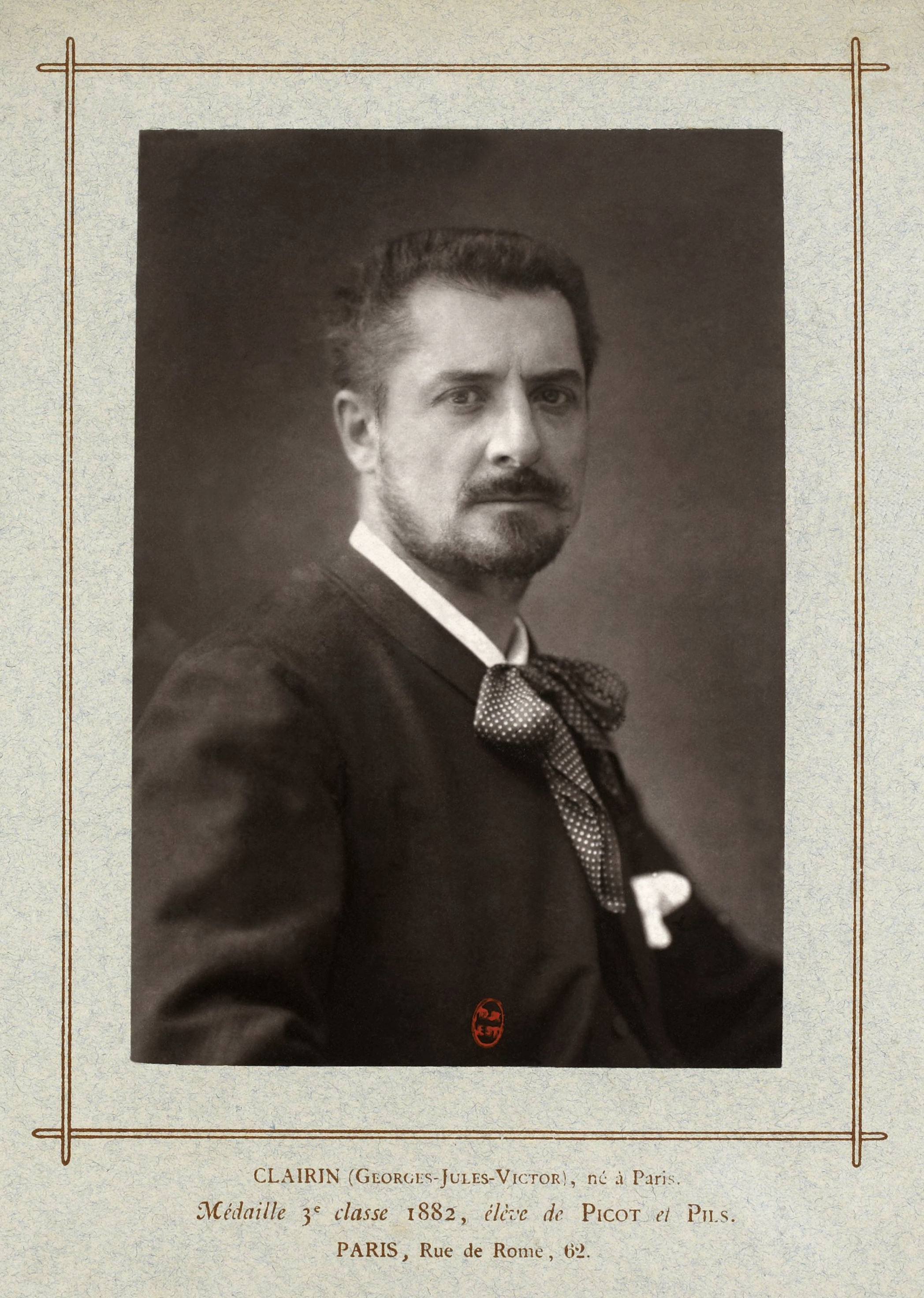
- Born: 11 September 1843; Paris, France
- Died: 2 September 1919 (aged 75); Clohars-Carnoët, France
- Education: Isidore Pils; François-Édouard Picot; École des beaux-arts de Paris
- Movement: Orientalist

Georges Jules Victor Clairin (11 September 1843 – 2 September 1919) was a French Orientalist painter and illustrator. He was influenced by Eastern imagery Moorish architecture, and visited North Africa many times, in particular Algeria, Morocco and Egypt. In Paris he led the life of a socialite, and befriended the glamorous actress Sarah Bernhardt, his friend for 50 years, and is today best known for his 'in costume' and informal intimate portraits of her.

== Life ==
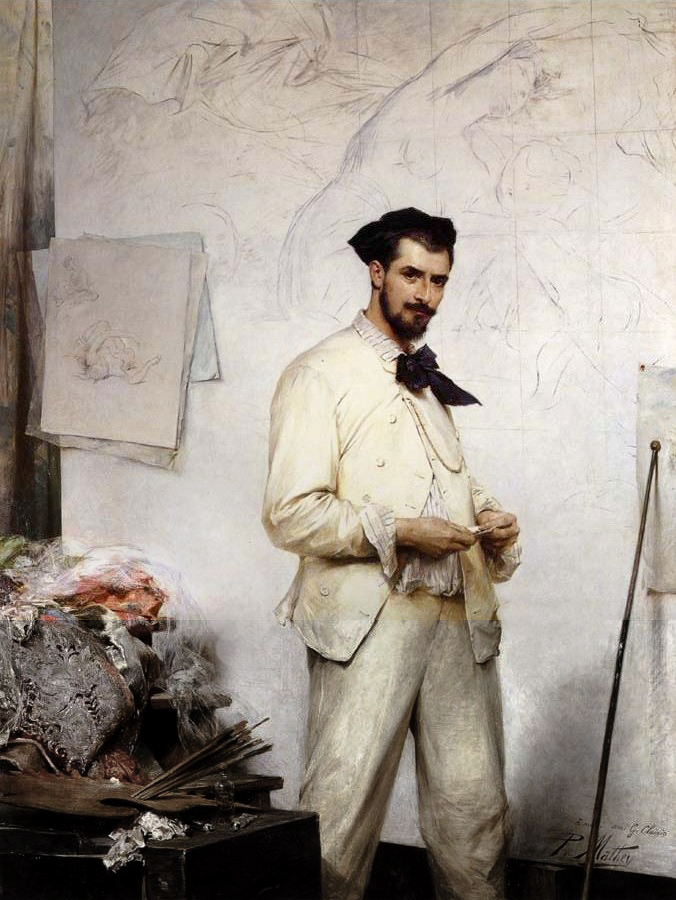
Georges Clairin depicted by Paul Mathey

Clairin was born in Paris. He apprenticed in the workshops of Isidore Pils and François-Édouard Picot. In 1861 he entered the École des beaux-arts de Paris, and in 1866 first displayed his work. He travelled to Spain with Henri Regnault and to Italy with François Flameng and Jean-Léon Gérôme. He met the Catalan painter Marià Fortuny in Morocco and they visited Tétouan together. In 1895, he travelled to Egypt with the composer Camille Saint-Saëns.

He is best known for his portraits of Sarah Bernhardt, with whom he had a long friendship and whom he depicted in costume for a number of her roles, including as the queen in Ruy Blas (1879), Mélisande in La Princesse Lointaine (1895 and 1899), Cleopatra (1900), Theodora (1902) and Saint Teresa of Ávila; he also showed her in less formal poses. Clairin painted many ceilings, among them the foyers of the Opéra Garnier (1874) and the Le Trident, the theatre of Cherbourg.

He died in 1919 in Pouldu, Clohars-Carnoët.

He was the uncle of the painter Pierre-Eugène Clairin.

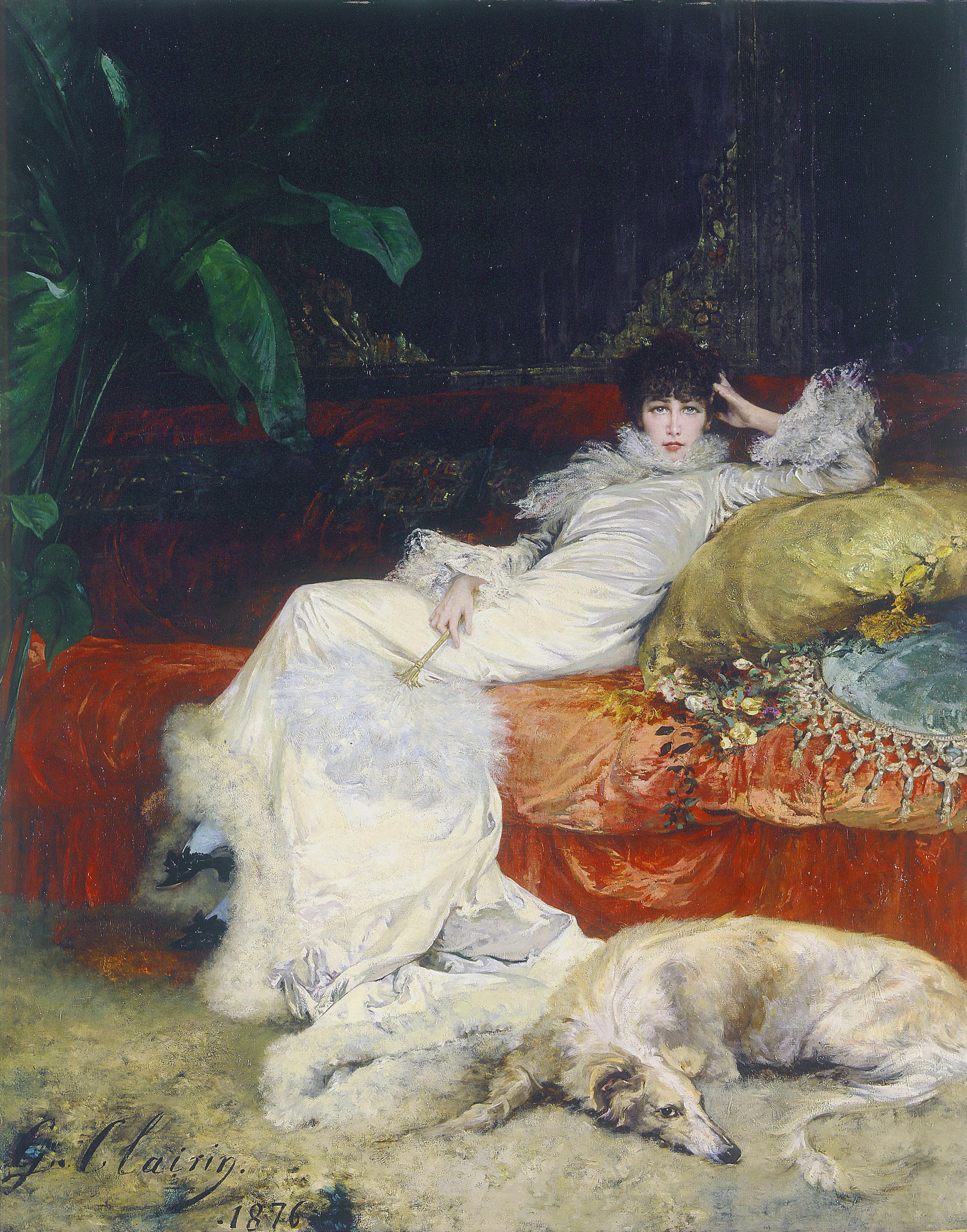
Portrait de Sarah Bernhardt (1876), Musée du Petit Palais

== Portrait of Sarah Bernhardt, 1876 ==
Clairin's 1876 portrait of Sarah Bernhardt drew praise. Théodore Véron said of it:

The portrait of Mademoiselle Sarah Bernhardt is assuredly one of the most prominent of the Salon, as much for the originality of its composition as for the splendour of its colour.

Monsieur Clarin shows us her wrapped in a long robe of white satin with a trailing train, she is resting on a luxurious divan of pink satin and leaning on a cushion of the same material draped in gold; to her right and in the depths of this Oriental apartment is a Venetian mirror surrounded by purple velvet curtains; to her left a tropical plant lowers its green leaves over the meditating actress and sculptress; at here feet a yellow hound of a large breed rests on its long legs and stretches out its proud and aristocratic head.

Emile Zola found that: "Mademoiselle Sarah Bernhardt isn't pretty but she has fine intelligent features and Clairin has been able to give her a smooth little face and vulgar sensuality like Cabanel would paint."

== In popular culture ==
In the 2024 French biopic Sarah Bernhardt, la Divine, Clairin was played by Clément Hervieu-Léger of the Comédie Française.

== Works ==
- Entrée à la mosquée du Chérif de Ouassam (1875)
- Les Favorites du sultan (1875)
- À l'extérieur du harem (1875)
- Portrait de Sarah Bernhardt (1876)
- Les brûleuses de varech à la Pointe du Raz (1882)
- Danseuse Ouled-Naïl (1885)
- L'Asie, L'Afrique (1889), Bourse de commerce de Paris
- Le Carnage (1890), Princeton University Art Museum
- Frou-Frou (1892)
- Fête fleurie
- Au balcon
- À l'opéra
- Portrait d'Alexandre Dumas fils
- Soldats français devant le temple de Karnak (1897)
- Sarah Bernhardt en Cléopâtre (1900)
- Retour des conscrits (désert d'Égypte) (1900)
- Marché à Madrid (1907) shown at the salon
- La Fantasia au Maroc (1907) shown at the salon
- Allah ! Allah ! (1908) shown at the salon
- Au lever du soleil, les moissonneurs arabes font leur prière (1909) shown at the salon
- Portrait de M. Terace à cheval, ministre de France à Tanger
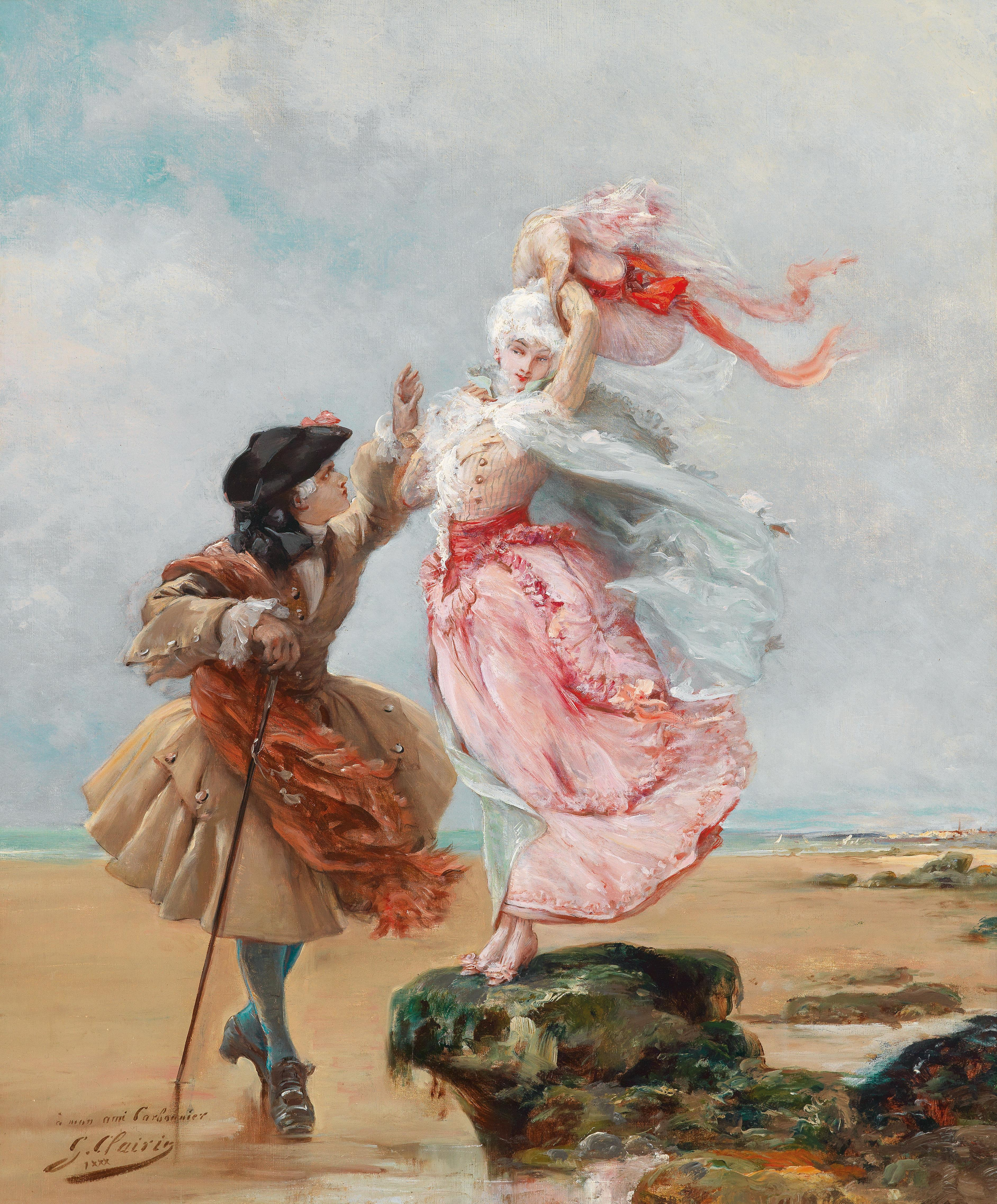
A galant couple from c. 1919

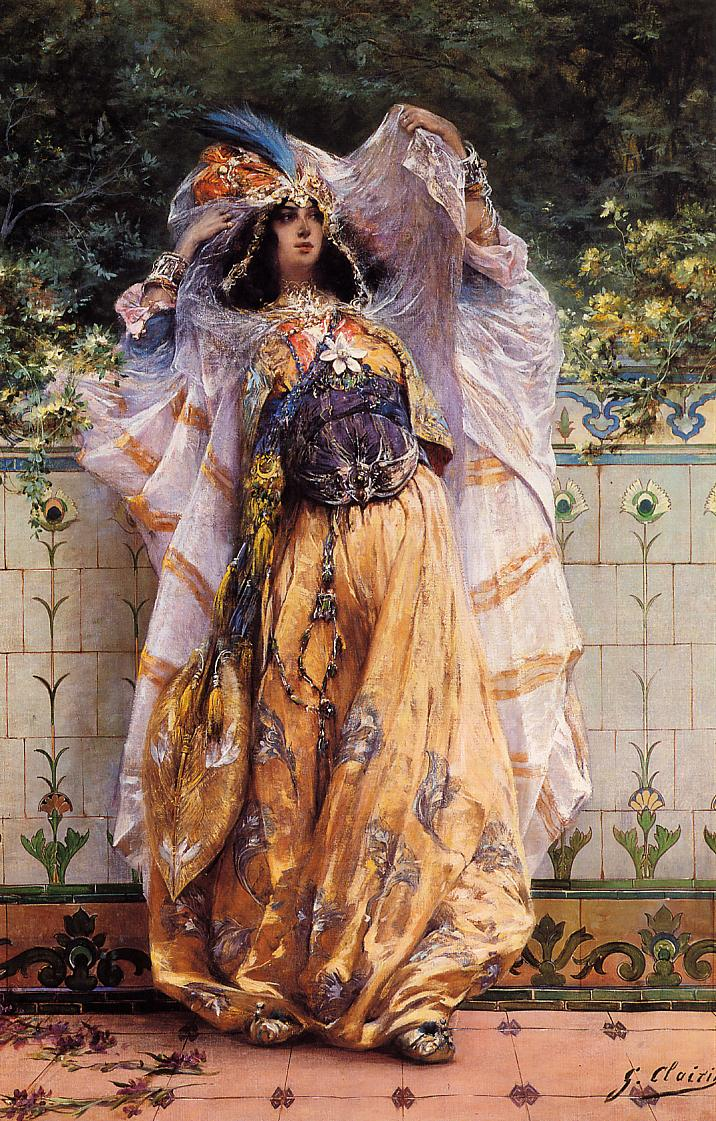
An Ouled Nail Tribal Dancer, 1895

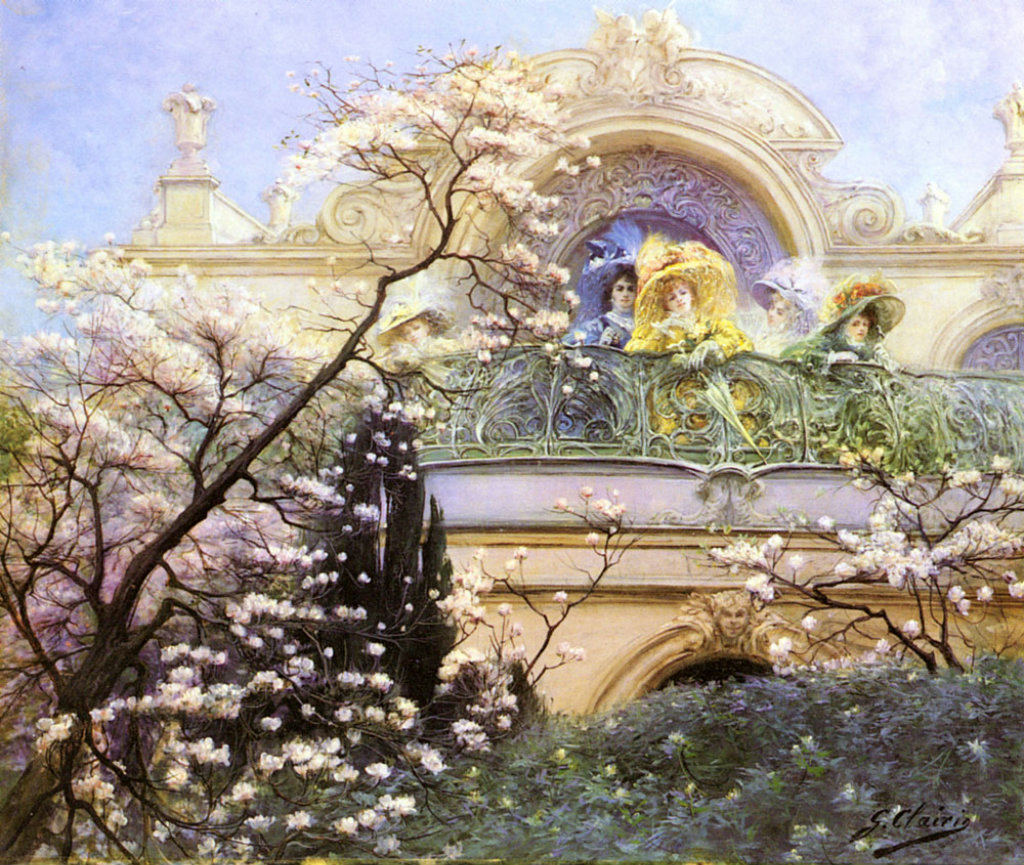
On the Balcony, c. 1910

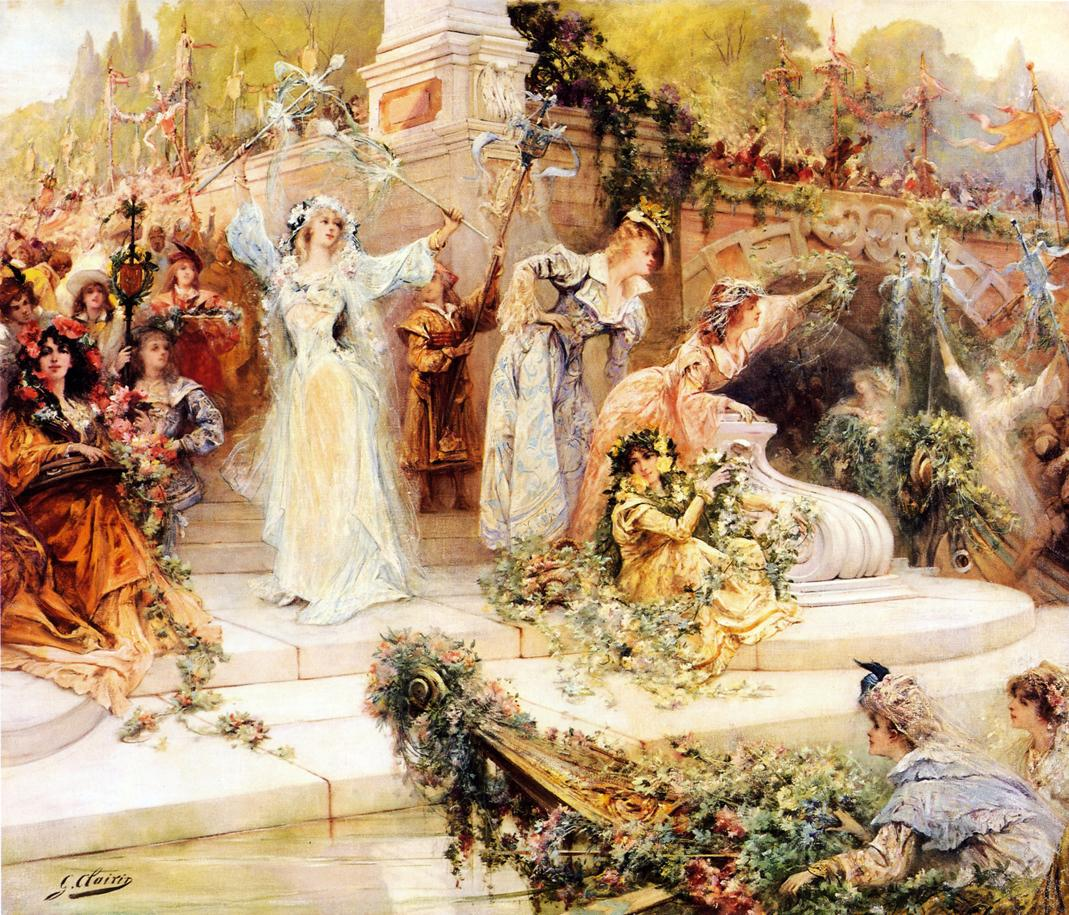
La Fête fleurie

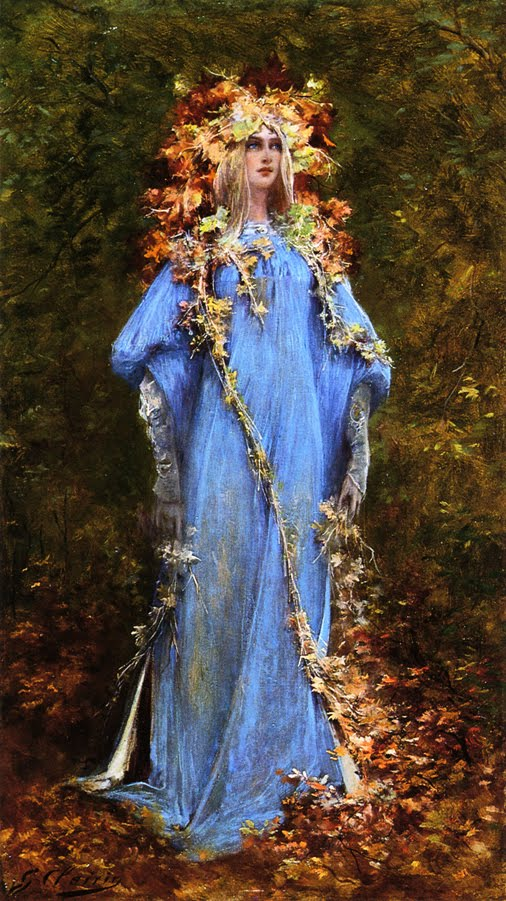
Actress in the role of Ophelia

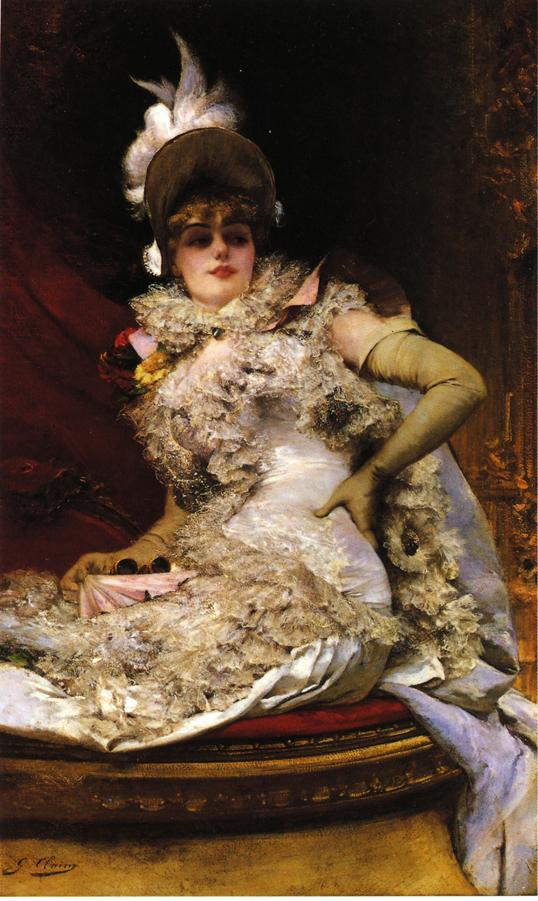
At the Opera, c. 1900

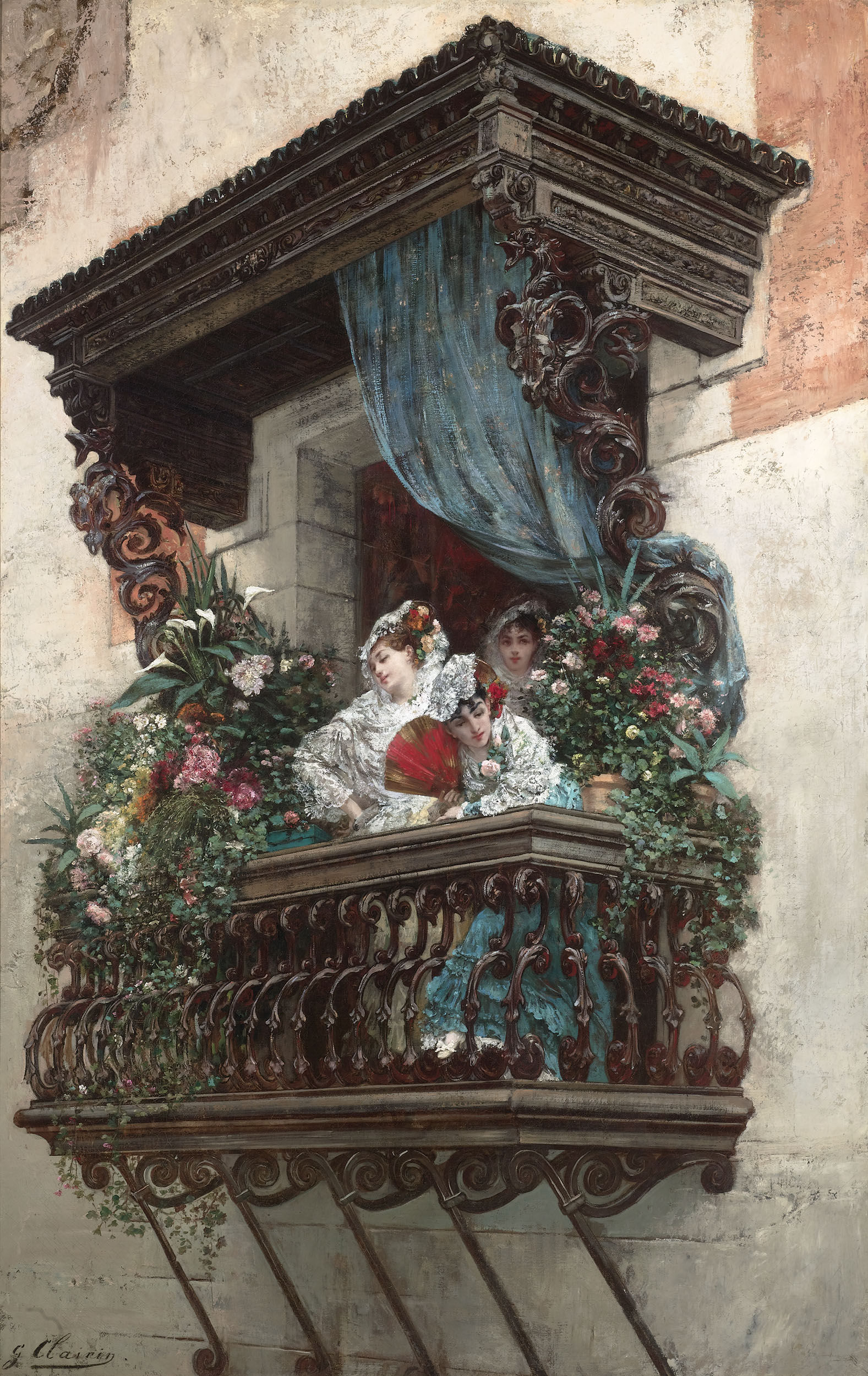
Spanish Women on Balcony

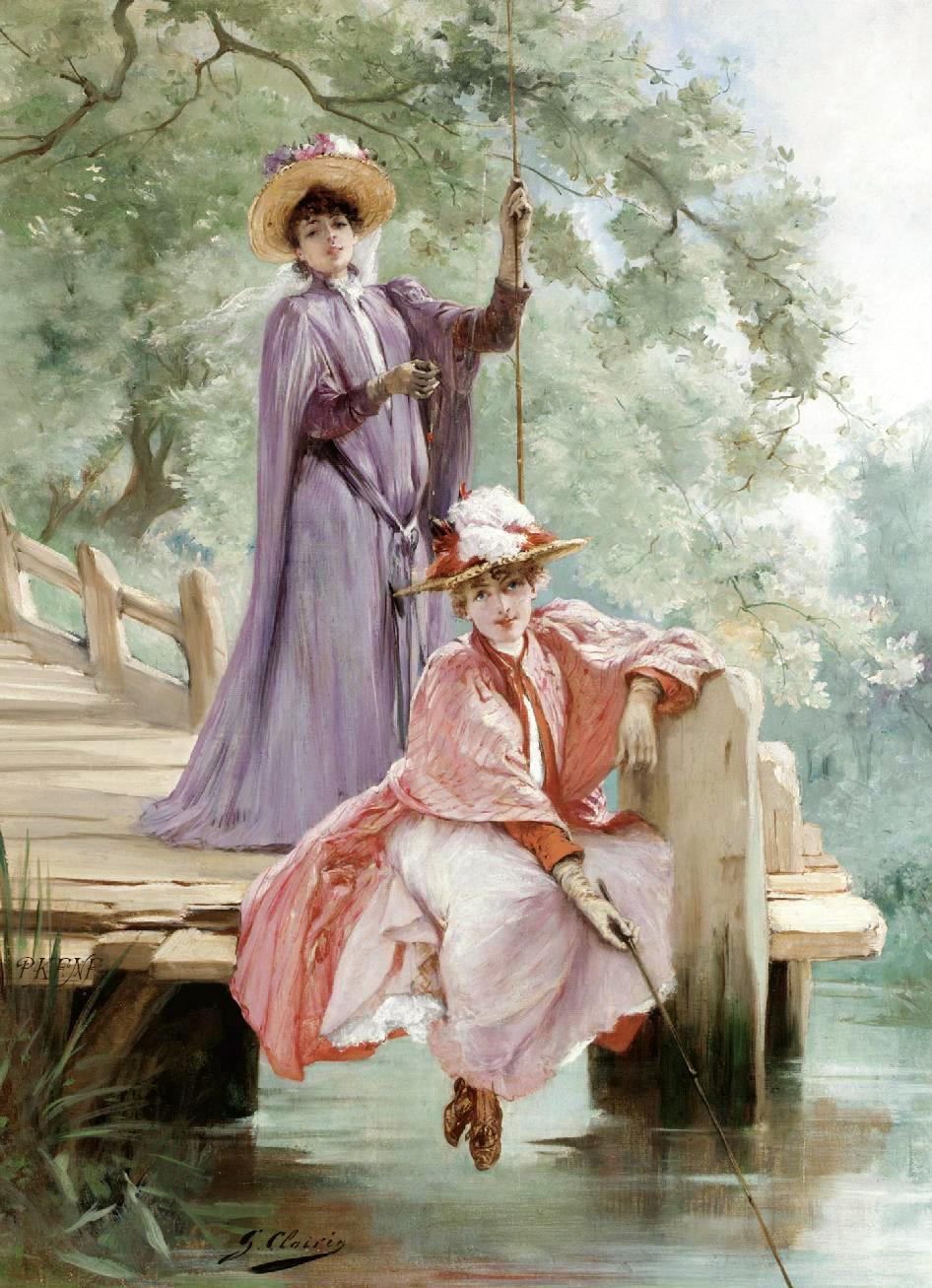
Sarah Bernhardt

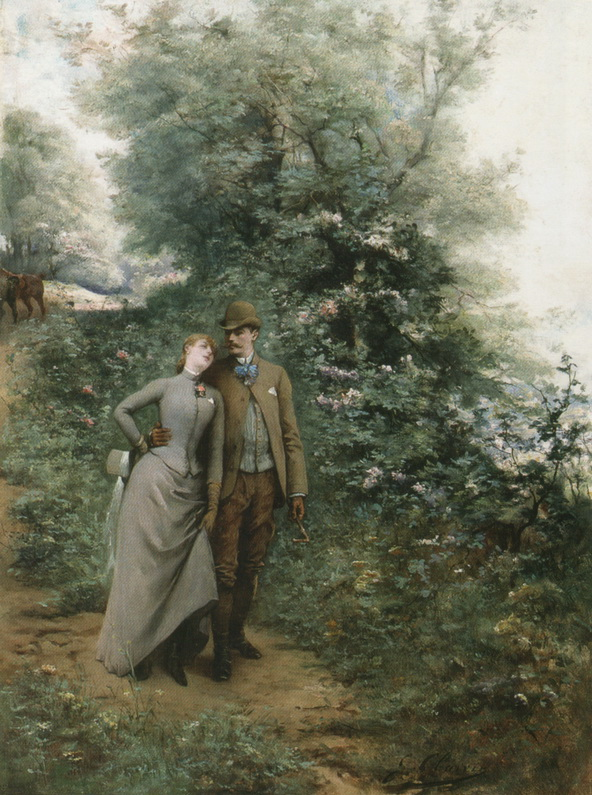
Walk in the Woods, c. 1900

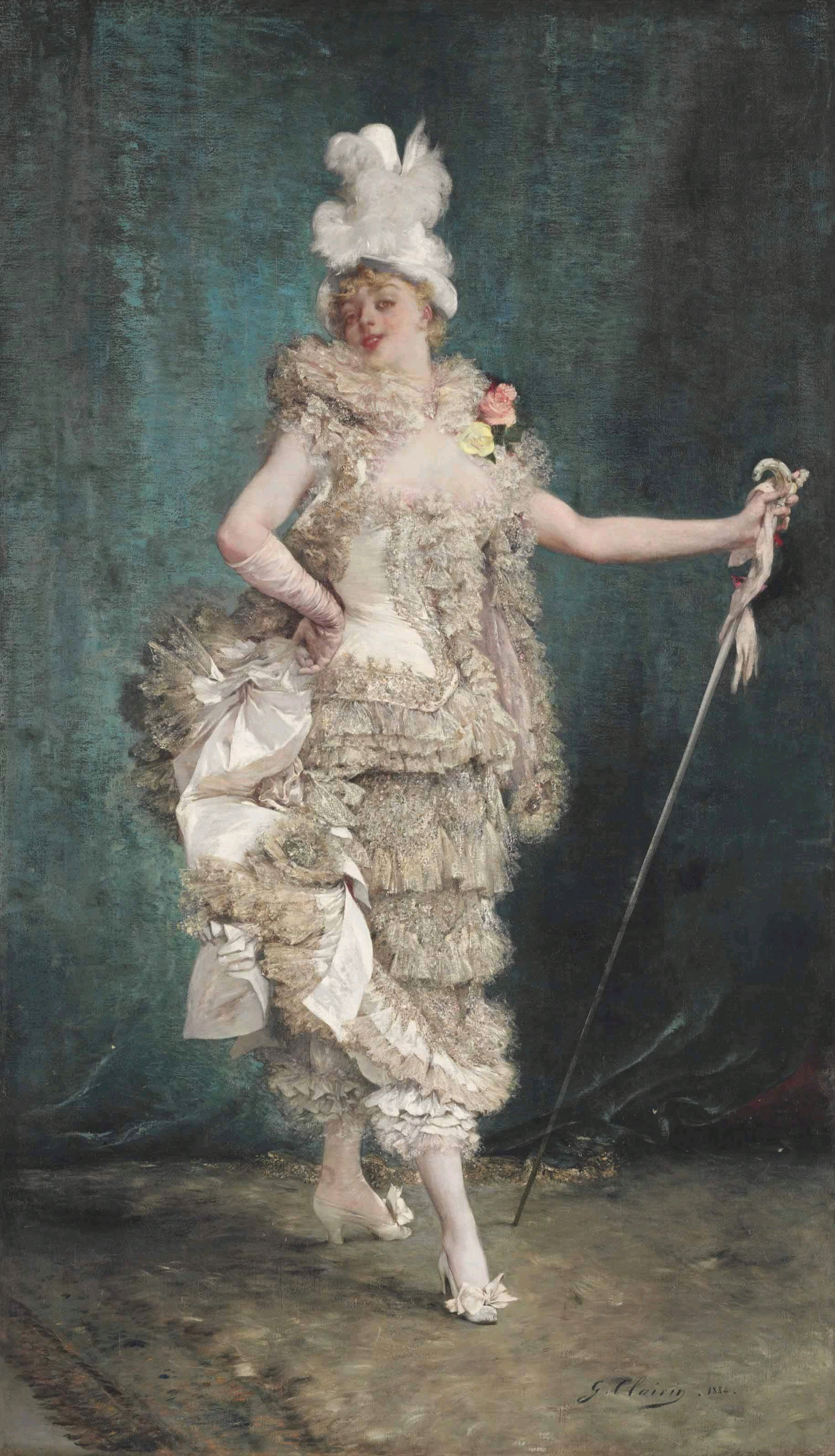
Frou Frou, 1882

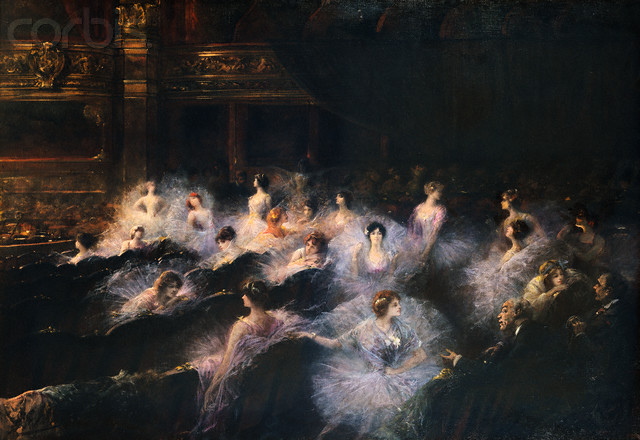
À l'opéra, or At the Opera, c 1900

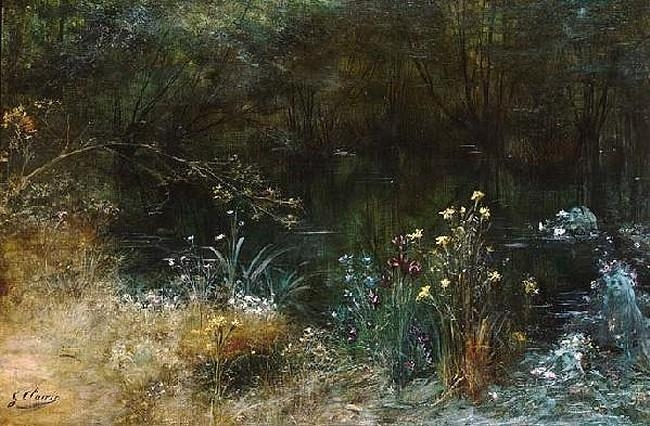
A lake with Naiads, c 1900

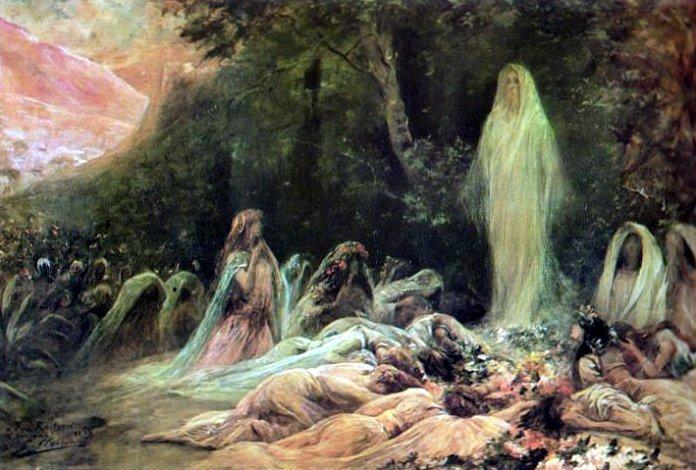
The distant Princess, c 1900

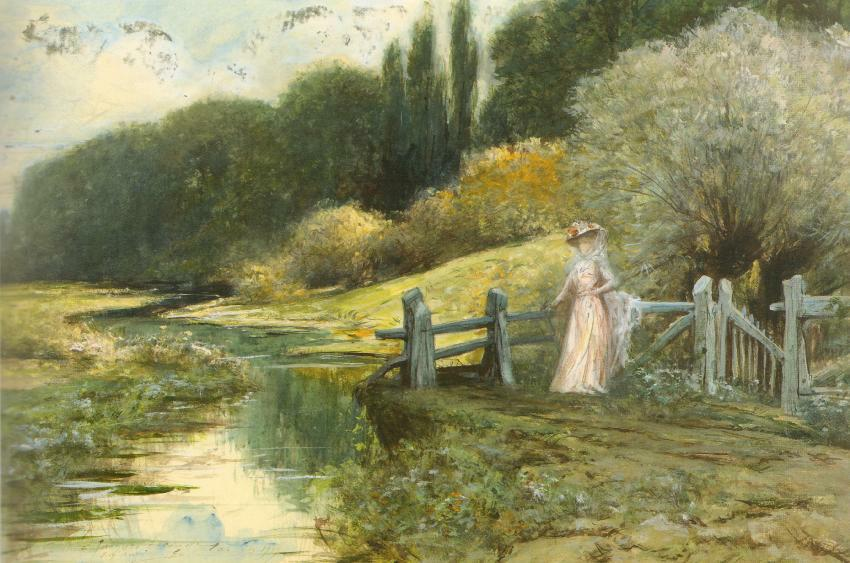
Young woman in the morning, 1909

== See also ==
- List of Orientalist artists
- Orientalism

== Bibliography ==
- Christine Peltre, Dictionnaire culturel de l'orientalisme, Éditions Hazan, Paris, 2008 ISBN 2-85025-882-2
