= Sleigh bed =

Style of bed resembling a sled

A sleigh bed is a style of bed with curved or scrolled foot and headboards, thus resembling a sled or sleigh.

Often made of wood and quite heavy, the sleigh bed is a result of the French and American Empire period of the early 19th century. The Empire style, and thus the American Empire style, drew its inspiration from the empires of ancient Rome and Greece.

Today's sleigh beds are made from a variety of materials including wood, iron, steel and aluminium, and often possess less exaggerated curves of the foot and headboards.

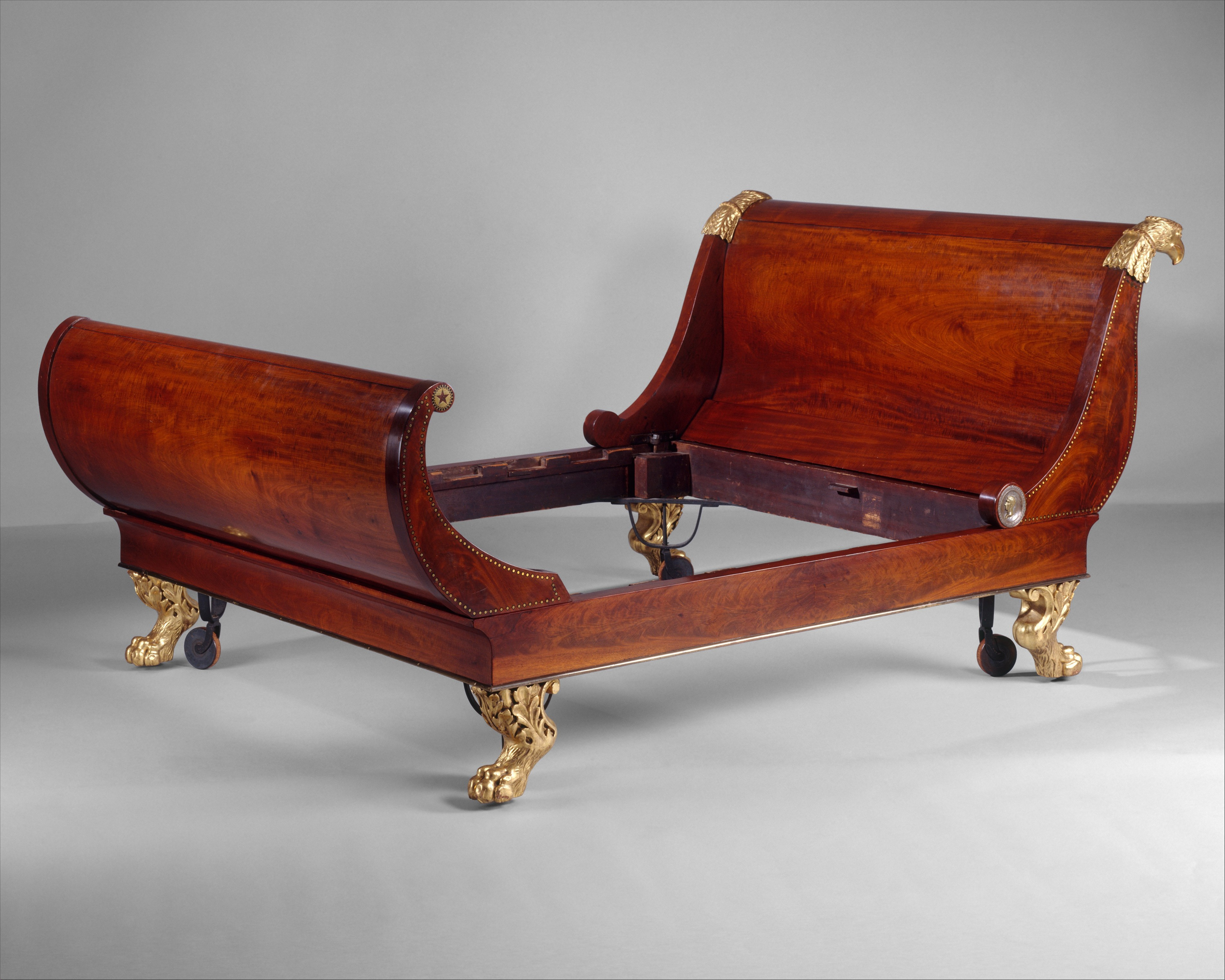
Bedstead (c. 1805/1808) by Charles-Honoré Lannuier, Classical galleries, Metropolitan Museum of Art, New York City

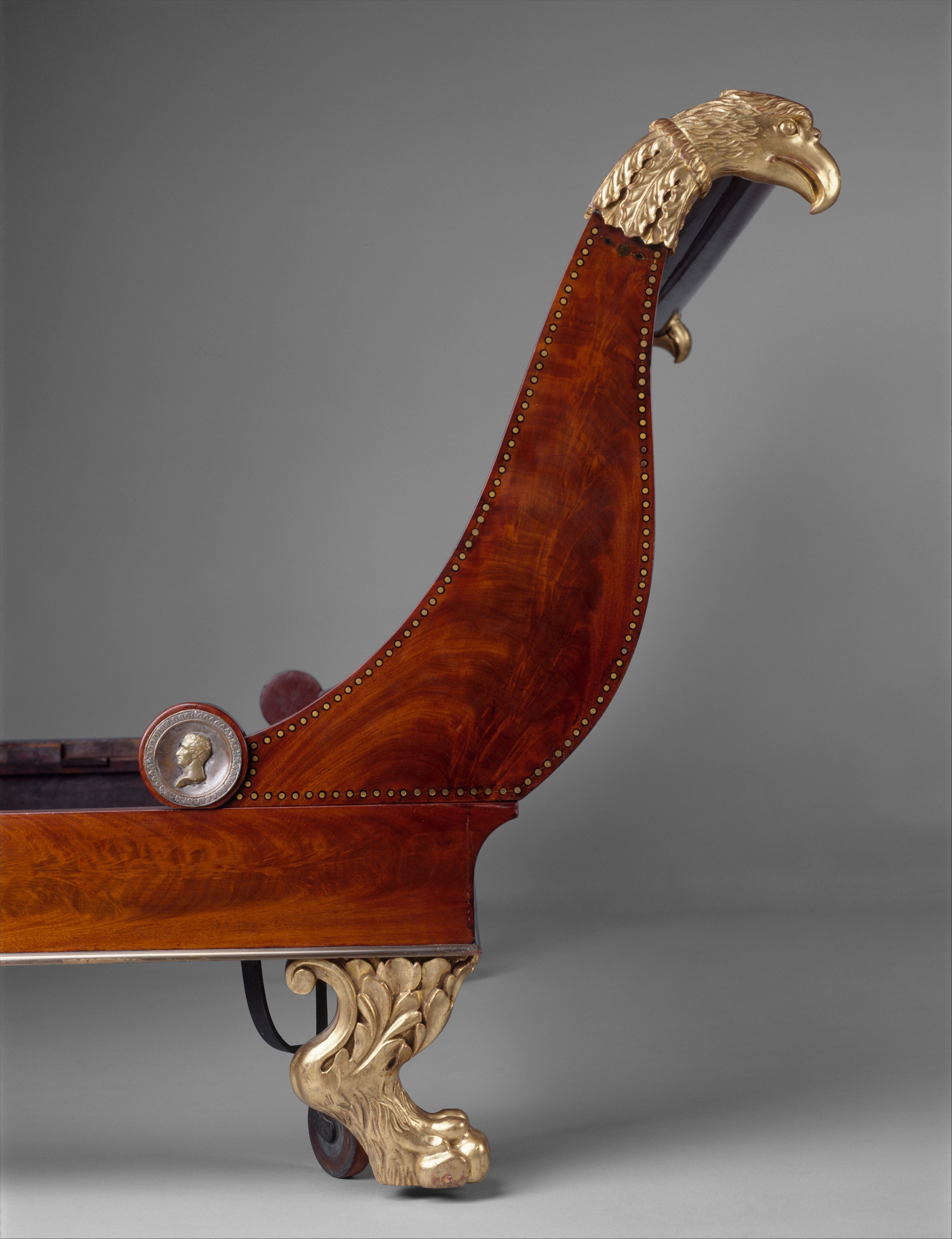
Bedstead (c. 1805/1808) by Charles-Honoré Lannuier, detail

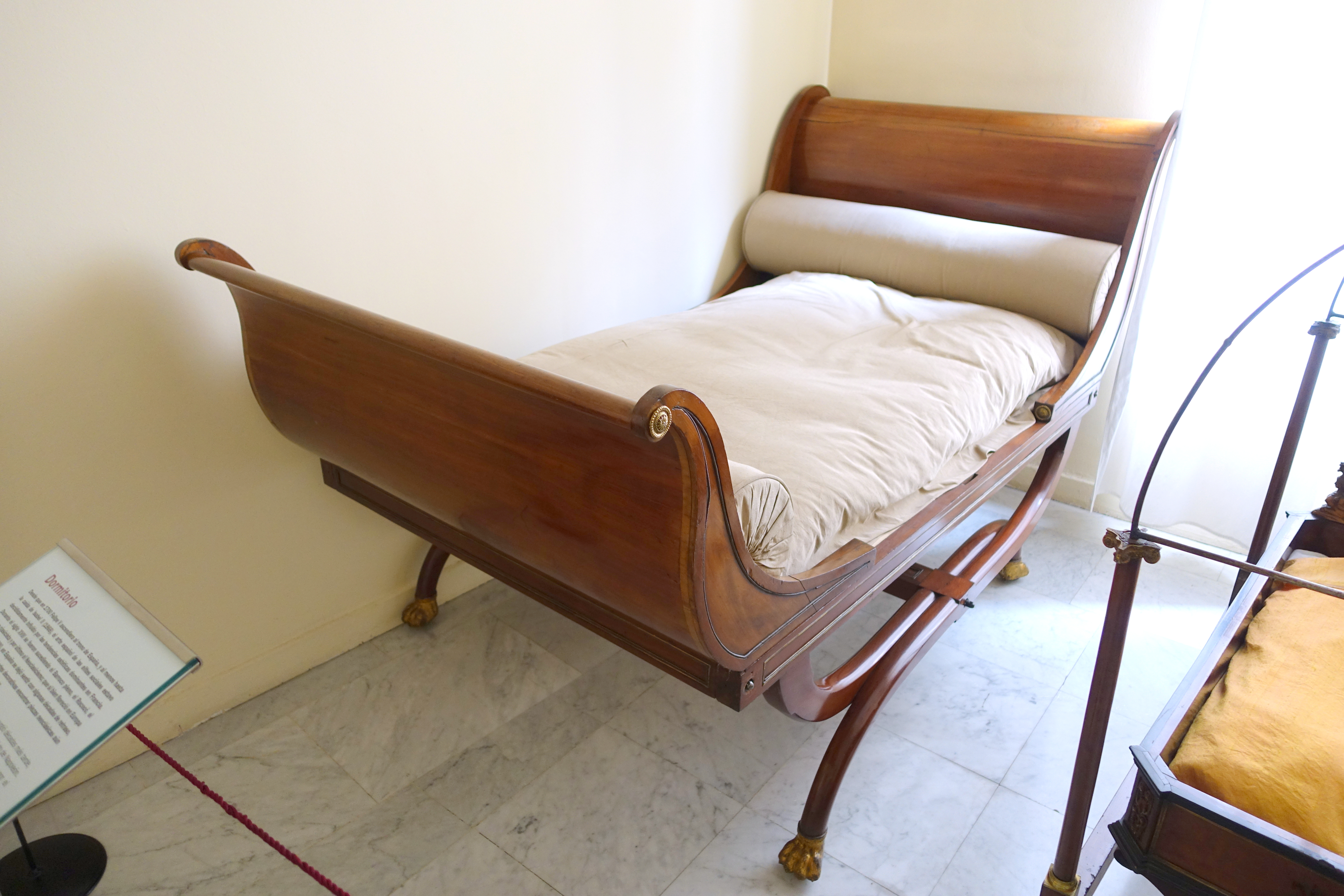
Sleigh bed (c. 1820), Museo Nacional de Artes Decorativas, Madrid, Spain

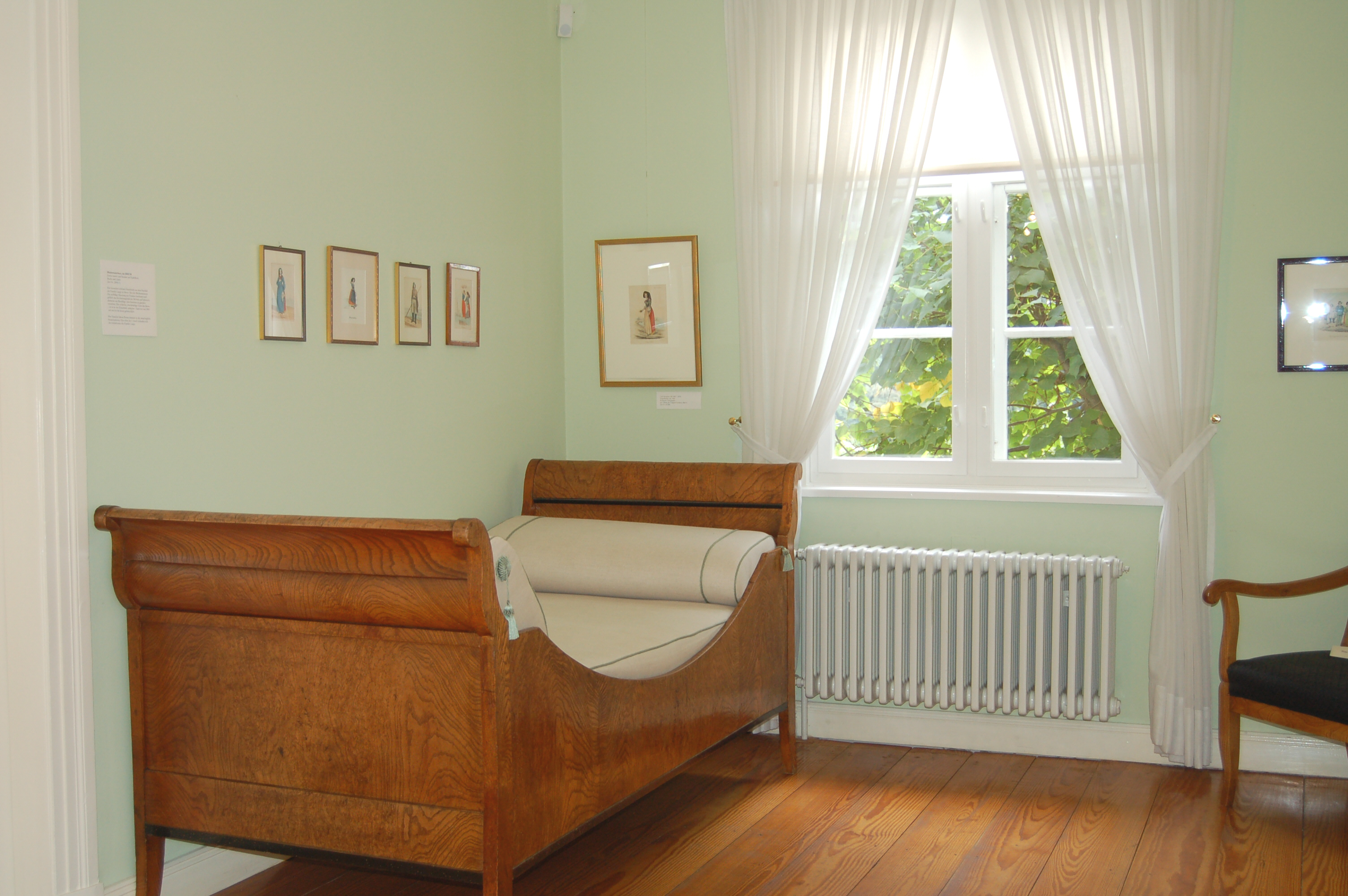
Sleigh bed (c. 1820/1830) in the Helgoland room, Museum Langes Tannen, Uetersen, Germany
