= Miguel Ángel Rojas =

Colombian conceptual artist (born 1946)

- Born: 1946 (age 78–79); Bogota, Colombia
- Known for: photography, video art

Miguel Ángel Rojas (born 1946, Bogotá, Colombia) is a conceptual art and filmmaker. His work includes drawing, painting, photography, installations and video and is often related to contexts expanding on issues of sexuality, urban culture, systems of violence, substance abuse, and economic inequalities. He has been working as a photographer, painter and architect since the 1970s.

== Artistic career ==
=== Education ===
Miguel Ángel Rojas completed his studies in painting at the School of Fine Arts at the National University of Colombia and in architecture at the University Javeriana.

=== Exhibitions ===
His work has been shown individually and collectively since 1972 in several countries around Latin, Central and North America, as well as Europe and Asia, such as the United States, Colombia, Venezuela, Australia, Puerto Rico, Cuba, United States, Japan, Brazil, England, Mexico, among others.

In 2024, Ángel Rojas's work was included in the 60th Venice Biennale's central exhibition Foreigners Everywhere, curated by Adriano Pedrosa. In his Venice Biennale debut, he exhibited the pieces El Negro (1979) and El Emperador (1973–1980) commenting on queer intimacy through a cinematic approach.

Miguel Ángel Rojas is featured in The Days That Build Us (2024-2025), a group exhibition centered on films and organized by PAMMTV, the video streaming platform, at Pérez Art Museum Miami. Rojas's Caqueta (2007) was shown alongside moving image artworks by Deborah Jack, Tania Candiani, Dara Friedman, and Rivane Neuenschwander.

=== Awards ===
His work has been awarded first prize in photography of the XXXII Salon of Colombian Artists in 1989; The II International Biennial of San Juan Prize 1979; León Dobrzinsky Prize 1981; Prize of the XXX Salon of Colombian Artists 1986 in Medellín with special notation of the V American Biennial of graphic arts 1988 in Cali; Prize of the Riogrande national Contest 1989."

== Exhibition History ==
=== Solo exhibitions ===
- 2021 Regreso a la Maloca, Bogotá Museum of Modern Art, Bogota, Colombia (Curated by Eugenio Viola)
- 2012 Camino Corto (Short Way), Art Museum of the National University of Colombia, Bogota, Colombia
- 2012 El nuevo Dorado (The New Dorado), ARCH: International Fair of Contemporary Art, Madrid, Spain
- 2011 At the Edge of Scarcity, Sicardi Gallery, Houston, Texas
- 2009 Pueblito (Little Town). Museum Bolivariano of Contemporary Art, Santa Marta, Colombia
- 2008 Fotofest 2008, Sicardi Gallery, Houston, Texas
- 2007 Objetivo-Subjetivo (Objective-Subjective), Museum of Art of the Bank of the Republic, Bogota, Colombia
- 2007 David, La vitrina, Lugar a Dudas, Cali, Colombia
- 2006 Fotofest 2006, Sicardi Gallery, Houston, Texas
- 2002 La Cama de Piedra (The Stone Bed), Colombian National Museum, Bogota, Colombia
- 2001 Sub, Valenzuela Gallery – Klenner, Bogota, Colombia
- 2000 La Cama de Piedra (The Stone Bed), French Alliance, Bogota, Colombia
- 1995 Pascal y Pascual (Pascal and Pascual), Museo Universitario del Chopo, Mexico City, Mexico
- 1992 Debug y Pintura (Drawing and Painting), Artery Gallery, Barranquilla, Colombia
- 1991 Bio, Bogotá Museum of Modern Art, Bogota, Colombia
- 1990 Miguel Ángel Rojas, Cartagena Museum of Modern Art, Cartagena, Colombia
- 1990 Miguel Ángel Rojas obra en process (Miguel Angel Rojas work in process), Medellin Museum of Modern Art, Colombia
- 1985 Bio, INTAR (International Arts Relations, Inc.), New York, New York
- 1982 Subjetivo (Subjective), Gallery Garcés-Velásquez, Bogota, Colombia
- 1981 Works on Paper, Americas Society, New York, New York
- 1980 Grain, Bogota Museum of Modern Art, Bogota, Colombia

Group exhibitions

- 2024 The Days That Build Us, PAMMTV, Pérez Art Museum Miami, Florida
- 2024 Nucleo Contemporano, 60th Venice Biennale, Venice, Italy
- 2012 La idea de América Latina (The idea of Latin America), Andalusian Centre of Contemporary Art of Seville, Seville, Spain
- 2012 Perder la forma humana. Una imagen sísmica de los años 80 latinoamericanos (To lose the human form. A seismic image of the years 80 of Latin America), Museo Nacional Centro de Arte Reina Sofía, Madrid, Spain
- 2010 29th São Paulo Art Biennial, “There is always to cup of sea to sail in”, São Paulo, Brazil.
- 2010 Multiple Landscape: Latin America in the MUSAC Collection, MUSAC, Spain.
- 2010 Cosmopolitan Routes: Houston Collects Latin American Art, MFAH, Sicardi Gallery, Houston, Texas
- 2010 A cidade do homem nu, São Paulo Museum of Modern Art, Sao Paulo, Brazil
- 2010 Al calor del pensamiento (To the heat of thought), Daros Collection at Bank Santander Foundation, Boadilla del Monte, Madrid, Spain
- 2008 Opening – Colombia, Station Museum of Contemporary Art, Houston, Texas
- 2005 Fotográfica Bogotá (Fotographic Bogota), Bogota, Colombia
- 2004 Cantos Cuentos Colombianos (Colombian Song Tales), Daros Collection, Zurich, Switzerland
- 2004 39 Artists National Salon, Bogota, Colombia
- 2003 Colombia 2003, Buenos Aires Museum of Modern Art, Buenos Aires, Argentina
- 2003 The American Effect, Whitney Museum of American Art, New York, New York
- 2002 VIII Biennial of Bogota, Bogotá Museum of Modern Art, Bogota, Colombia
- 2001 Colombia Visible e Invisible (Visible and Invisible Colombia), Fernando Pradilla Gallery, Madrid, Spain
- 1999 Re-Aligning Vision, Miami Art Museum (current PAMM), Florida
- 1998 Re-Aligning Vision, Archer M. Huntington Art Gallery, Texas University, Austin, Texas; Museo de Bellas Artes (Caracas), Caracas, Venezuela; Museo de Arte Contemporáneo de Monterrey, Monterrey, Mexico
- 1997 Re-Aligning Vision, Museo del Barrio, New York; Arkansas Art Center, Little Rock, Arkansas
- 1997 Premio Marco 96, Museo de Arte Contemporáneo de Monterrey, Monterrey Mexico
- 1996 Art, Political and Religion, Barbican Centre, London, United Kingdom
- 1996 Realismo Mágico? Arte Figurativo de Los Años Noventas en Colombia (Magic realism? Figurative Art of the 90s in Colombia), Galerie Théoremes, Brussels, Belgium; Melina Mercury Cultural Center, Athens, Greece; University of Essex & Aberysmith, United Kingdom
- 1996 Latin America 96 in the Fine Arts Museum, Museo Nacional de Bellas Artes (Buenos Aires), Buenos Aires, Argentina
- 1996 V Biennial of Bogota, Bogotá Museum of Modern Art, Bogota, Colombia
- 1996 Marco Prize 95, Museo de Arte Contemporáneo de Monterrey, Monterrey, Mexico
- 1995 Arte, Política y Religión (Art, Politics and Religion), Mead Gallery, Warwick Art Centre, University of Warwick, Coventry, United Kingdom
- 1995 A Propósito de Colombia (Apropos Colombia), Kulturhaus Lateinamerika, Cologne, Germany, Marco Prize, Museo de Arte Contemporáneo de Monterrey, Monterrey, Mexico
- 1994 V Havana Biennial, Museum of Fine Arts, Havana, Cuba
- 1993 Latin American Artists of the Twentieth Century, Museum of Modern Art, New York (MoMA), New York
- 1992 Echo Art, Museum of Modern Art, Rio de Janeiro, Brazil
- 1992 Joan Miro Sculpture Prize, Miro Centre, Barcelona, Spain
- 1992 Latin American Artists of the Twentieth Century, Plaza de Armas, Seville, Spain
- 1992 Colombian Contemporary Art, Expo Seville 92, Seville, Spain
- 1992 America Latins Art Contemporain, Hotel give Arts, Foundation National give Arts, Paris, France Echo Art, Museum of Modern Art, Rio de Janeiro, Brazil
- 1991 Myth and Magic in America, The Eighty, Museum Marco, Monterrey, Mexico
- 1990 Images of Silence, Bronx Museum of the Arts, New York; Museum of Contemporary Art, San Juan, Puerto Rico
- 1990 Bogota Art Biennial, Museum of Modern Art, Bogota, Colombia
- 1989 Images of Silence, Museum of Modern Art of Latin America, Washington, D.C.
- 1987 A Body Marginal, Center for Photography, Paddington, Australia
- 1986 Cem Anos de Arte na Colombia, Imperial Palace, Rio of Janiero, Brazil
- 1986 IV Biennial American of Graphic Arts, Museum The Social Gathering, California
- 1986 II Havana Biennial, Museum of Fine Arts, Havana, Cuba
- 1983 World Print Four, Museum of Modern Art, San Francisco, California
- 1982 4th Biennial of Sydney, Sydney, Australia
- 1982 Muñoz-Astudillo-Rojas-Ramírez, Museum The Social gathering, Cali, Colombia
- 1981 Graphic arts Panamericanas, Center for Inter-American Relations, New York, New York
- 1981 4th Biennial of Art of Medellín, Palace of Exhibitions, Medellín, Colombia
- 1981 16th Sao Paulo Biennial, Sao Paulo, Brazil
- 1979 11th Biennial International of Recorded, Tokyo, Japan
- 1979 Il Trienal Latin American of Recorded, Arts Centre and Communication, Buenos Aires, Argentina
- 1979 IV Biennial Latin America of Graphic Arts, San Juan, Puerto Rico
- 1979 I Biennial International of Painting, Municipal Museum of Modern Art, Cuenca, Ecuador
- 1977 The Plastic Colombian of This Century, House of The Americas, Havana, Cuba
- 1977 The Novisimos Colombian, Museum of Art Contemporaneo, Caracas, Venezuela
- 1976 III Biennial Latin American of Graphic Arts, San Juan, Puerto Rico

== Collections (selection) ==
- Pérez Art Museum Miami, Florida
- Museum of Modern Art, New York, New York
- Kadist, San Francisco, California
- Art Institute of Chicago, Illinois
- Museum of Fine Arts, Houston, Texas
- La Caixa Foundation, Barcelona Spain
- Luis Angel Arango Library of the Republic Bank, Bogota, Colombia
- Daros Latin America Collection, Zurich, Switzerland
- Colombian National Museum, Bogota, Colombia
- National University Museum of Art, Bogota, Colombia
- House of the Americas, Havana, Cuba
- Instituto Nacional de Bellas Artes y Literatura, Mexico DF, Mexico
- MUSAC, Museum of Contemporary Art of Castile and Leon, Spain
- Museo de Bellas Artes (Caracas), Caracas, Venezuela
- Museum of American Art of Managua, Managua, Nicaragua
- Museum of Contemporary Art, Vigo, Monterrey, Mexico
- Bogotá Museum of Modern Art, Bogota, Colombia
- La Tertulia Museum, Cali, Colombia
- Museum of Modern Art, Bucaramanga, Colombia
- Colección de la Rectoria de la Universidad Nacional de Colombia, Bogota, Colombia
- Collection Embassy of Colombia in Spain, Madrid, Spain
- Museum of Modern Art, Barranquilla, Colombia
- Embassy of France, Bogota, Colombia
- Museum of Modern Art, Cartagena, Colombia
