= Dara Friedman =

German-American video artist

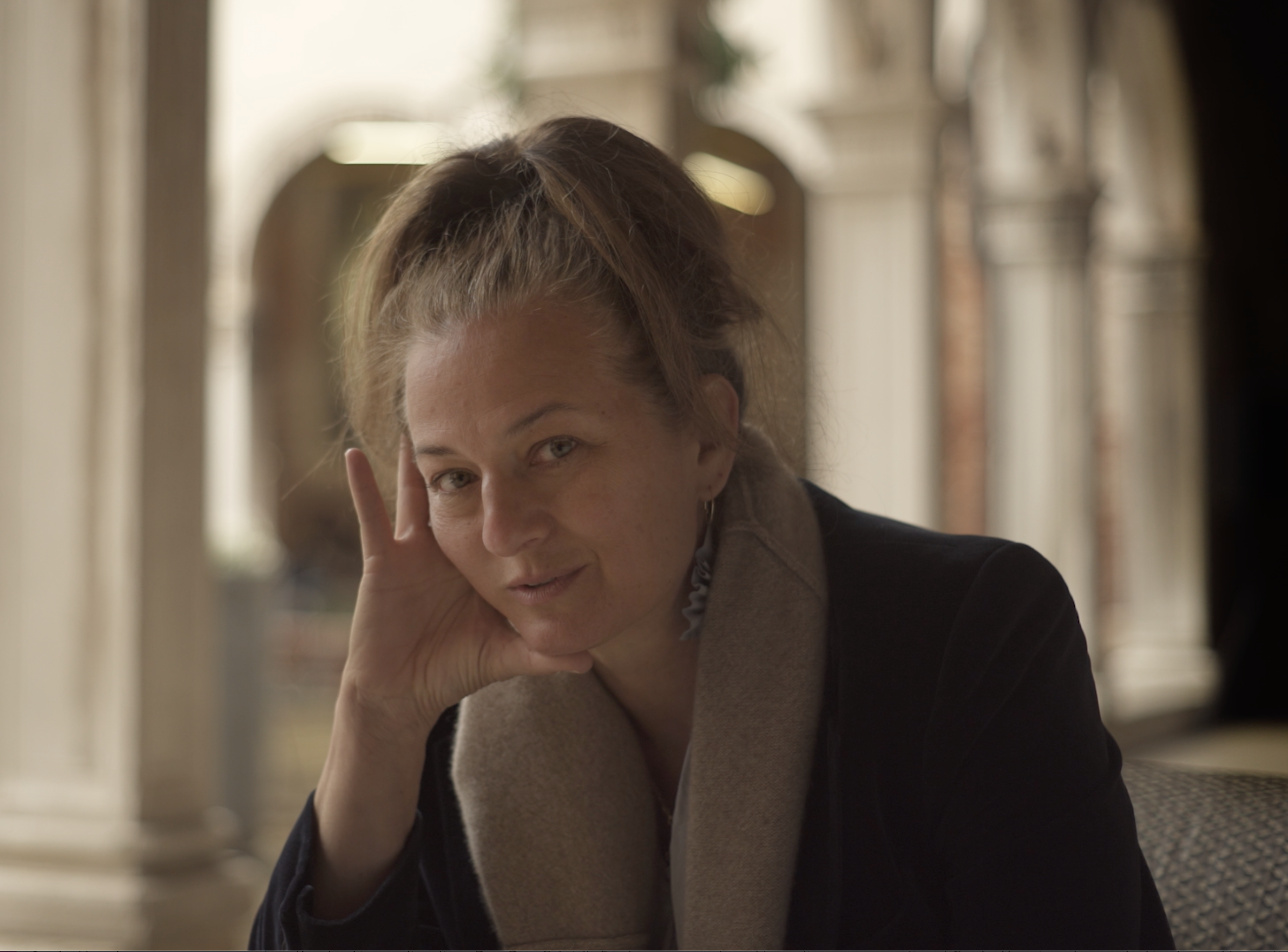
- Dara Friedman (2019)
- Born: Dara Friedman; 1968 (age 57–58); Bad Kreuznach, Germany
- Website: darafriedman.com

Dara Friedman (born 1968, Bad Kreuznach, Germany) is an artist who creates film and video works that use a carefully orchestrated filming and editing process, often collaborating with individuals and communities to capture the expressive qualities of the human body.

== Background ==
Friedman was raised between Palm Beach County and Bad Kreuznach, Germany. Her mother is an artist and her father was a Jewish doctor in the United States Army and stationed in Germany during her youth. As a child, she took dance lessons and would attend dress rehearsals at the Düsseldorf Ballet where her aunt, Bernhild Thormaehlen, was a dancer. Dancers and performers feature frequently in Friedman's works, such as Dancer (2011), Play (Parts 1 & 2) (2013), Rite (2014), and Mother Drum (2015–16). In 2022, she was a Visiting Artist at the School of Art + Art History at University of Florida.

She received her AB from Vassar College in 1990, and studied at the Städelshule in Frankfurt from 1989 to 1991. In 1994 she received an MFA, Motion Pictures from the School of Communication at the University of Miami. Friedman studied under Austrian artist and Structural film pioneer Peter Kubelka, and describes her work as a form of poetry that communicates visually without a reliance on verbal or traditional, narrative storytelling.

In 1992, she moved to Miami where she continues to participate as an active member in the artistic community.

== Work and career ==
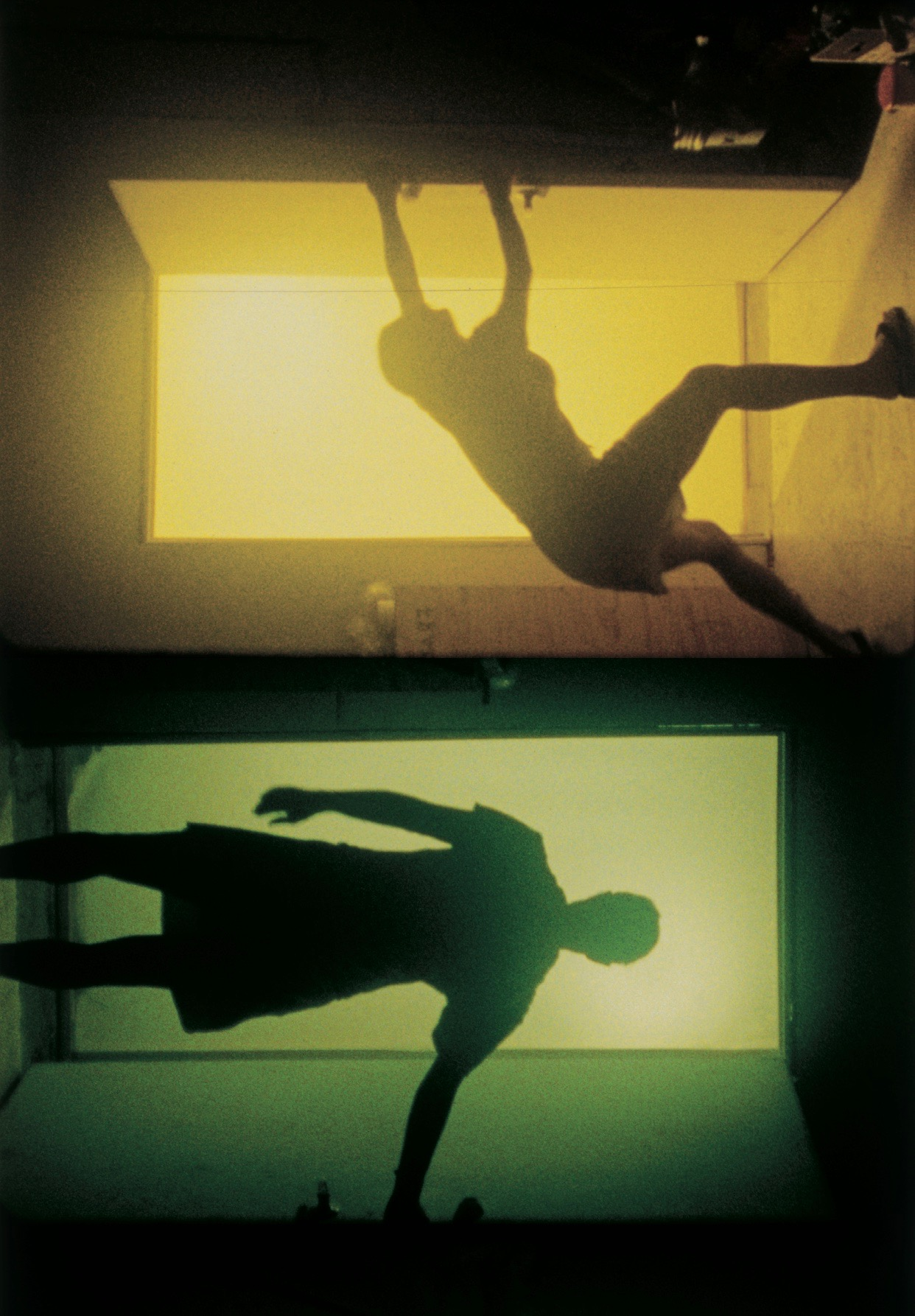
"Bim Bam," 1999, 16mm film installation with two slot-loading projectors, metal armature and non-sync sound

Friedman's film and video work is regarded for its ability to reduce film to its most basic, material essences in ways that create emotionally compelling, visceral experiences. She often works in 16mm and Super 8 film formats, although also using standard and high-definition cameras. A rigorous planning and editing process creates a visceral visual experience that is complemented by the unpredictability of the human subjects she often works with. The artist establishes relationships with the people who perform directly for her camera, sometimes identified through a casting call, in order to create intimate filming environments that capture an element of natural spontaneity. Although these films do not have linear narratives, the calculated presentation of bodies in motion encourages the viewer to connect with the subjects and places on screen. Since the 1990s, Friedman has created film, videos, and installations that integrate these elements of structured and dynamic visuals. She is represented by Gavin Brown's enterprise, who has consistently featured Friedman's work since 1998.

== Exhibitions ==
The artist's first mid-career survey was organized by the Pérez Art Museum Miami, and curated by René Morales in 2017. The show featured fifteen installations spanning 20 years of her video works. A monographic catalog was produced by the museum in commemoration of the exhibition and the artist's career milestone.

In 2024, Friedman's piece Romance (2001) is included in The Days That Build Us, organized by PAMMTV, the video art streaming platform, at the Pérez Art Museum Miami, Florida. The 32-minute film captured the affective interactions and kisses of seventy couples in public spaces. The work of Dara Friedman is exhibited next works by Tania Candiani, Rivane Neuenschwander, Deborah Jack, and Miguel Ángel Rojas.

=== Solo exhibitions ===
Solo exhibitions of Friedman's work have also include:

- 1998: Dara Friedman: Total, Museum of Contemporary Art, Chicago
- 2001: Dara Friedman, SITE Santa Fe
- 2002: Dara Friedman, Kunstmuseum Thun
- 2005: Dara Friedman: Sunset Island, The Kitchen
- 2007: Musical, Public Art Fund
- 2009: Musical, The Museum of Modern Art
- 2009: Shooting Gallery, Julia Stoschek Collection
- 2012: Dara Friedman: Dancer, Contemporary Art Museum, Raleigh
- 2012: Dara Friedman: Dancer, Miami Art Museum
- 2013: Dara Friedman: Dancer, Centre for Contemporary Art Ujazdowski Castle
- 2013: Hammer Projects: Dara Friedman, Hammer Museum
- 2014: Dara Friedman: Projecting, Museum of Contemporary Art Detroit
- 2014: Play (Parts 1 & 2), Hammer Museum
- 2017: Mother Drum, Aspen Art Museum
- 2018: Dara Friedman: Perfect Stranger, Pérez Art Museum Miami, Florida
- 2019/20: Dara Friedman: Temple Door - Kunstverein Harburger Bahnhof, Hamburg, Germany

== Collections ==
Among the public collections holding work by Friedman are the Austrian Film Museum, Vienna; Bard College, Annandale-on-Hudson, New York; Hammer Museum, Los Angeles; Institute of Contemporary Art, Miami; Museum of Modern Art, New York; Pérez Art Museum Miami; Saint Louis Museum of Art; and the Whitney Museum of American Art, New York.

== Awards ==
Friedman has been recognized with the following awards:

- 2019: Guggenheim Fellowship
- 2016: South Florida Cultural Consortium Fellowship
- 2012: Hammer Museum Artist Residency
- 2000: Rome Prize, American Academy in Rome
- 1999: Louis Comfort Tiffany Foundation Grant
- 1998: South Florida Cultural Consortium Fellowship
- 1997: New Forms Miami, Miami-Dade Department of Cultural Affairs

== Personal life ==
Friedman is married to artist Mark Handforth. They live and work in Miami with their two daughters.
