= Tania Candiani =

Mexican artist (born 1974)

- Born: 1974; Mexico City, Mexico
- Known for: Multimedia art
- Notable work: Pulso (Pulse)
- Awards: Guggenheim Fellowship

Tania Candiani (born 1974) is a Mexican artist known for her interdisciplinary, large-scale, multimedia installations. In 2011, she was named a Guggenheim Fellow.

Candiani was born in Mexico City.

== Work ==
Candiani has shown her work around the world, including the Meno Parkas Galerija in Lithuania, Kunsthaus Miami in Florida, and the Museum of Contemporary Art in San Diego, and her work is held by museums such as the Centro Cultural Tijuana, the Mexican Museum in San Francisco, and the Museum of Latin American Art in Los Angeles. Her first solo museum show was Cinco variaciones sobre circunstancias fónicas y una pausa at the Laboratorio de Arte Alameda in Mexico City 2012.

Her work was selected for the Mexican Pavilion at the 2015 Venice Biennale. In 2019, she participated in the "Platform" section of the Armory Show with her 2019 work Reverencia.

She was a 2010 International Studio & Curatorial Program Resident, sponsored by FONCA - Fondo National para la Cultura y las Artes.

She was awarded a Guggenheim Fellowship in Fine Arts in 2011. During her fellowship term, she worked on a project exploring the interconnectedness of the construction of our homes, garments, and self-identities. In 2018, she was a Visiting Artist and Scholar at Arizona State University.

The solo exhibition Tania Candiani: For the Animals, was presented at the Museum of Contemporary Art, Denver, Colorado, in 2022. The exhibition was a product of Candiani's two-year geological and cultural investigation of the natural formation called Hole in the Rock in Arizona.

Candiani's Waterbirds: Migratory Sound Flow one-person exhibition was on view at Locust Project, Miami. The installation centers around sound landscapes and bodies of water indigenous to Mexico and South Florida. This presentation was originally commissioned for the 23rd Biennale of Sydney, Australia.

In 2024, the Pérez Art Museum Miami opened Tania Candiani: Pulso a solo presentation of the artist three-channel video installation Pulse (2016-2018). The artwork is based on a collective performance organized by the artist gathering nearly 200 women in 2016 in Mexico City. It depicts women and girls playing the teponaztli indigenous instrument. The film is an ode to indigenous material culture and female bonds as well as spiritual beliefs around land ownership. For The Days That Build Us (2024-2025), organized by PAMMTV, a video streaming platform, at Pérez Art Museum Miami, Candiani's 8-minutes long Monumentos Efímiros (2019) is being shown next to moving image pieces by artists in the likes of Deborah Jack, Rivane Neuenschwander, Miguel Angel Rojas, and Dara Friedman.

== Collections ==
Her three-channel video installation Pulso (Pulse) created between 2016-2018 was acquired by the Pérez Art Museum Miami, Florida, and it is being featured in the collections display for the year of 2024.
