= Jed Johnson with Dachshund =

c. 1973 painting by Andy Warhol

- Artist: Andy Warhol
- Year: c. 1973
- Medium: Acrylic and silkscreen ink on canvas
- Movement: Pop Art
- Subject: Jed Johnson and Archie
- Dimensions: 35.5 cm × 28 cm (14.0 in × 11 in)

Jed Johnson with Dachshund is a silkscreen painting by American artist Andy Warhol, created c. 1973. The portrait depicts Warhol's longtime partner, filmmaker and interior designer Jed Johnson, holding their dachshund Archie. Based on a Polaroid photograph taken by Warhol, the painting is an intimate look into Warhol's domestic life. Warhol produced several versions of the composition along with related portraits of Johnson from the same photo session titled Jed Johnson.

== Background ==
Pop artist Andy Warhol met 19-year-old college student Jed Johnson shortly after Johnson arrived in New York City with his twin brother, Jay Johnson, from Sacramento, California in February 1968. Within days of their arrival, the brothers were mugged and lost their wallets. When they went to Western Union to wire home for money, a clerk offered them jobs as telegraph messengers. Johnson subsequently delivered a telegram to Warhol's studio, the Factory, where he met Warhol associate Paul Morrissey. Morrissey, who was looking for help stripping and repainting the studio's wooden surfaces, hired Johnson to assist with the work.

Warhol took an interest in Johnson and his brother, commenting: "They're like the prince and the pauper: The more masculine one, Jed, has long hair. The prettier one has a crew cut and is more feminine. They're so pretty. They're from Sacramento."

Following the attempted assassination of Warhol at the Factory in June 1968, Johnson visited him frequently during his hospitalization. After Warhol's release, Johnson regularly stopped by his townhouse at 1342 Lexington Avenue, initially bringing his mail and soon helping with groceries, cooking meals, household chores, and taking his mother Julia Warhola to her weekly doctor appointment. Johnson also assisted Warhol with editing Warhol's films beginning with Lonesome Cowboys (1968), a role that suited his reserved personality because he was "painfully shy."

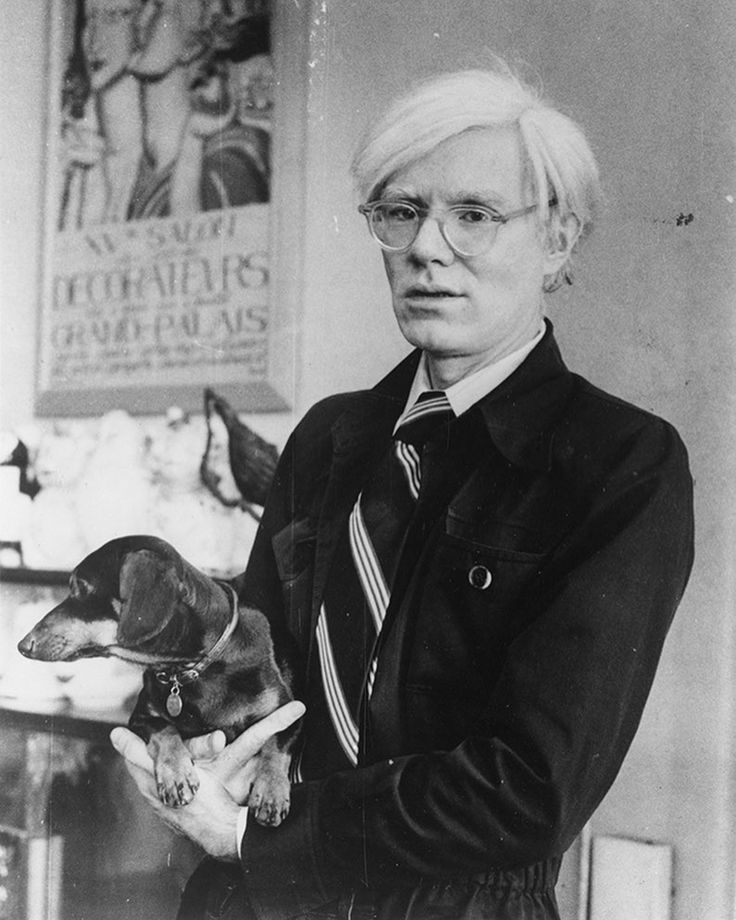
Warhol and Archie at the Factory, 1974

Jay Johnson later recalled that Warhol was his brother's first boyfriend. His growing affection for Warhol, and the fact that it was reciprocated, marked an important moment of self-discovery for Johnson. By early autumn 1968, Johnson had moved into Warhol's townhouse, and came to "fill the traditional role of a devoted young spouse."

Johnson accompanied Warhol on business trips, social engagements, and art exhibition openings, becoming a familiar presence at his side. The press described him as "Andy's shadow" and "Warhol's new standard of male beauty." The couple acquired a male dachshund puppy in November 1972 and named him Archie, after the television character Archie Bunker from All in the Family.

Johnson and Warhol doted on Archie, who quickly became a prominent fixture in Warhol's public life and famous in his own right. Warhol took Archie to the Factory, restaurants, parties, and on trips to Europe. Archie also appeared in photographs and drawings by Warhol. Several images of Johnson and Archie, particularly from 1973, are part of the Warhol's extensive collection of Polaroid photographs that he took of people in his circle.

== Technique and production ==
Warhol returned to painting in 1972 after several years of focusing primarily on filmmaking. With an exception of his Mao series, Warhol increasingly used his own Polaroid photographs as the basis for silkscreen paintings as he developed his portrait practice. Jed Johnson with Dachshund is based on a Polaroid photograph, reflecting his typical practice.

Rather than producing a single unique painting, Warhol made multiple versions of the composition, varying the color and application of silkscreen ink. Like other paintings from this period, including works from his Mao series, Jed Johnson with Dachshund incorporates a loose, painterly quality, with areas of finger-applied paint visible within the silkscreen image.

Former Interview editor Bob Colacello described Warhol's painting process in his diary entry on December 31, 1973. First, Warhol traced the outline of a face from an enlarged photo negative onto tissue paper. The tissue was then placed over carbon paper on the raw canvas, and retraced by pressing the carbon outline onto the canvas. Warhol then applied acrylic paint with a large brush resembling a house-painting brush, rarely cleaning it as he moved between areas and colors. He also used his hands, "especially fingers, to create texture, gesture, blend colors. He doesn't clean hands much either, so colors merge, appear here and there, disappear rather arbitrarily. After it dries the photo negative is silkscreened (by Alex Heinrici at his own studio) onto the painted canvas."

== Description ==
Measuring 14 × 11 inches (35.5 × 28 cm), Jed Johnson with Dachshund is considerably smaller than Warhol's standard 40 × 40-inch (102 × 102 cm) commissioned portraits. It was executed in acrylic paint and silkscreen ink on canvas. The painting depicts Johnson in a close-up portrait holding Archie, who appears in the lower portion of the composition. It has areas of color blending with visible brush and finger marks on the canvas.

== Interpretation ==
Jed Johnson with Dachshund is part of Warhol's extensive portraiture of Johnson, whom he frequently photographed during their 12-year romantic relationship. Reflecting on Johnson's role within Warhol's personal and professional life, Warhol's former assistant Gerard Malanga recalled:

I never knew Andy to be satisfied in a love relationship until he met Jed Johnson. Somehow I felt that Andy might have actually got somebody that he could love in Jed. Whatever boyfriends Andy had prior to Jed were distractions to his art, they didn't really contribute anything to enhancing or helping him, but Jed was very helpful. He would set up the projectors, put the film in the projectors, sweep the floor. I got along famously with him. Jed was a real sweetheart.

Writer Bob Colacello, who worked closely with both Warhol and Johnson, likewise recalled Johnson's appeal:

There was something so appealing about Jed's shyness and calm. He spoke so softly you had to lean in close to hear what he was saying; he often said nothing at all while the rest of us babbled on, competing to be the wittiest for Andy and his tape recorder. Jed didn't try to be smart or funny or anything at all; he was incapable of showing off; he just was what he was: a slim, silent beauty in perfectly pressed jeans and neatly checked shirts, as handsome and intriguing as the young Gary Cooper, a sweet, innocent fawn among the tigresses and hyenas.

Warhol's depiction of Johnson and Archie gives the painting an intimate quality that distinguishes it from his commissioned celebrity portraits, as it immortalizes members of his own household. Archie was also recurring subject in Warhol's work. He drew portraits of Archie and painted his second dachshund, Amos, for his Cats and Dogs series in 1976.

== Exhibitions ==
Two Jed Johnson with Dachshund paintings along with two similar Jed Johnson paintings were included in the retrospective Andy Warhol—From A to B and Back Again, held at the Whitney Museum of American Art in New York City from November 12, 2018, to March 31, 2019. The exhibition subsequently traveled to the San Francisco Museum of Modern Art from May 18 to September 2, 2019, and the Art Institute of Chicago from October 20, 2019, to January 26, 2020.

Three Jed Johnson with Dachshund paintings, alongside two Jed Johnson paintings, were included in the exhibition Andy Warhol: Velvet Rage and Beauty at the Neue Nationalgalerie in Berlin from June 9 to October 6, 2024.

== Collections ==
Two Jed Johnson with Dachshund paintings are held in the Andrew Hall and Christine Hall collection of the Hall Art Foundation. The Hall Collection also includes two related portraits titled Jed Johnson. The Andy Warhol Museum in Pittsburgh also has two versions of Jed Johnson with Dachshund.
