= Bleckner =

Bleckner is a surname. Notable people with the surname include:

- Jeff Bleckner (born 1943), American theatre and film director
- Ross Bleckner (born 1949), American artist
