= Cats and Dogs (Warhol) =

1976 series of portraits by Andy Warhol

- Artist: Andy Warhol
- Year: 1976
- Movement: Pop Art
- Subject: Domestic cats and dogs

Cats and Dogs is a 1976 series of portraits by American artist Andy Warhol. The series consists of silkscreen paintings and drawings depicting stylized images of domestic cats and dog breeds. Produced during a period when Warhol increasingly embraced commissioned portraiture and decorative subject matter, Cats and Dogs reflects his interest in animals and the commercialization of imagery applied to familiar subjects.

== Background ==
Animals were a constant presence in Pop artist Andy Warhol's life, functioning as familiar and trusted companions. Echoing a remark often attributed to actor Will Rogers, Warhol once said, "I never met an animal I didn't like." Over the years, he elevated some of these animals to subjects in his art across various media, while others left more literal marks on his work. His fondness for domestic pets began in childhood with the Warhola family dog, Lucy, in the 1940s. In the 1950s, he kept more than two dozen Siamese cats—most named Sam, with one called Hester—which inspired his book 25 Cats Name Sam and One Blue Pussy (1957).

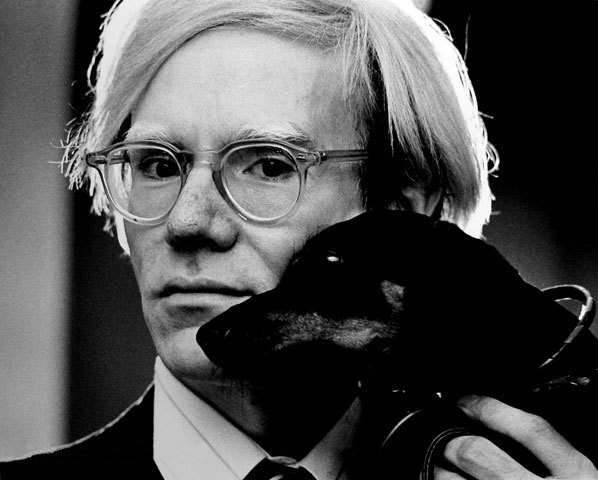
Andy Warhol with his pet dachshund Archie, 1973

In the 1960s, Warhol's studio, the Factory, was home to two resident cats, Black Lace and White Pussy. In the 1970s, Warhol and his longtime partner Jed Johnson acquired two dachshunds, Archie and Amos. Warhol depicted Johnson and Archie together in Jed Johnson with Dachshund (c. 1973).

By the mid-1970s, Warhol had largely shifted away from the avant-garde filmmaking and the "bohemian debauchery" of the Silver Factory years, concentrating instead on commissioned portraits and print portfolios to financing Interview magazine and pay his staff.

In 1976, while painting a portrait of art collector and newspaper magnate Peter Brant's cocker spaniel, Ginger, Brant and Warhol's business manager Fred Hughes proposed that Warhol produce an entire series devoted to cats and dogs. Warhol embraced the idea, noting that it could open a new avenue for his commissioned portraiture.

== Production ==
Warhol initially worked from taxidermied animals, which he found easier to paint from life, including his stuffed Great Dane Cecil that stood near the bulletproof door at his studio, and a stuffed cat called Factory. Warhol later turned to living subjects, among them his dogs Archie and Amos, Broadway the cat, and a Brussels Griffon named Danger, who appeared in characterful, vividly colored compositions.

== Commissions ==
In 1976, Peter Brant and gallerist John Mayor believed there was a strong market for commissioned portraits of pet cats, dogs, and horses, and they entered into an exclusive contract with Warhol to pursue such works. Ultimately, however, the arrangement yielded only three commissions. One was a portrait of Ivanjica, the celebrated mare owned by French businessman Jacques Wertheimer, who won the Prix de l'Arc de Triomphe in 1976. The remaining commissions were dog portraits: one of Pom, the King Charles Spaniel belonging to Lady Adeane, wife of Mayor Gallery director Sir Robert Adeane, now in the collection of the East Anglia Art Fund; and another of Maurice, the dachshund of golf champion Gabrielle Keiller. Keiller had seen the Cats and Dogs exhibition at the Mayor Gallery in London and promptly commissioned a portrait of her dachshund, Maurice. Warhol visited her at Telegraph Cottage in Kingston upon Thames, where he photographed Maurice, later using the images as the basis for the painting in New York. The portrait is now in the collection of the National Gallery of Scotland.

== Exhibitions ==
Cats and Dogs debuted at the Arno Schefler Gallery in New York City in the exhibition Andy Warhol: Animals, on view from May 25 to June 1, 1976. It was presented at the Mayor Gallery in London in the exhibiton Cats and Dogs by Andy Warhol, which ran from June 29 to August 13, 1976. The screen prints were priced at £16,000 each. James Mayor arranged for Cats and Dogs to be exhibited along with other Warhol works at the Dhaiat Abdullah Al Salem Gallery in Kuwait in January 1977.

In 2006, 22 of Warhol's drawings and paintings of dogs were displayed in the Man's Best Friend exhibition at Lococo Fine Art in St. Louis.

In 2008, the Andy Warhol Museum in Pittsburgh presented the exhibition Canis Major: Warhol's Dogs and Cats (and Other Party Animals), featuring photographs, paintings, screenprints, drawings, and videos of animals, including Warhol's pets.

In 2012, the Carnegie Museum of Natural History collaborated with the Andy Warhol Museum to display Dogs and Cats paintings.

== Critical reception ==
Art critic William Feaver of The Observer wrote: "Andy Warhol shows no signs of being bothered about his artistic role. … at the Mayor Gallery in London, the petlovers' capital, he presents some recent portraits of cats and dogs, among them Amos, his superstar dachshund. The technique is the same as for his Marilyns, Maos and others. … Off-register shadows, bulky retouchings, and variant repeats ring the changes nicely. And there are some frizzy drawings of the pets too."

Art critic Caroline Tisdall wrote for The Guardian: "Cats and dogs are a curious sequel to Chairman Mao …The drawings are not at all like the virtuoso stepping through the styles that Warhol practices on Mao. They are done with a rough zigzagging line that's as far from the sentimentality of Landseer as it is from the precision of Stubbs. … the colour combinations as inimitably bold as the Marilyns and the self-portraits. It would be tempting to look for self-portraits here too, among the dachshunds, boxers, and felines … The cats perhaps have a touch of his cool, enigmatic mask, but they rather outdid him."

Fenella Crichton wrote for Art International: "Blown up well over life-size, and coloured in virulent or sickly shades, these animals look like characters which have strayed from a nightmare Disney. … As Warhol has made a cult of anonymity, always selecting public images, whether stars or executions, the fact that these works were all portraits of individual animals, clearly represented a significant shift of strategy. But Warhol has always with taste, and these schmaltzy creatures demonstrated a new onslaught on an area which is vulnerable both sides of the Atlantic."
