= Mao (Warhol) =

1972–73 series of silkscreen paintings by Andy Warhol

- Artist: Andy Warhol
- Year: 1973
- Medium: Acrylic and screenprint on linen
- Movement: Pop Art
- Subject: Mao Tse-tung
- Dimensions: 66.5 cm × 55.9 cm (26.2 in × 22.0 in)
- Location: Whitney Museum of American Art, New York City
- Accession: 76.44

Mao is a series of silkscreen portraits by American artist Andy Warhol, created between 1972 and 1973. The works depict Mao Tse-tung, the leader of the Chinese Communist Party, whose image Warhol transformed from a political symbol into a subject of mass-media-inspired repetition and celebrity imagery.

The series includes paintings in varying sizes and a portfolio of 10 screenprints, issued in an edition of 250. Although based on a political figure, the works focus less on Mao's ideology than on the circulation and visual power of his image, continuing Warhol's exploration of cultural icons such as Marilyn Monroe and Jackie Kennedy.

== Background ==
Pop artist Andy Warhol began creating his Mao series in 1972, with financial support from the New York galleries Knoedler & Co. and the Leo Castelli Gallery, along with backing from collector Peter Brant. The series was prompted by Warhol's Swiss dealer, Bruno Bischofberger, who, along with Warhol's business manager Fred Hughes, encouraged him to paint again. According to former Interview editor Bob Colacello, Bischofberger suggested that Warhol depict the most important figure of the twentieth century, whom he considered to be Albert Einstein. Warhol replied, "That's a good idea. But I was just reading in Life magazine that the most famous person in the world today is Chairman Mao. Shouldn't it be the most famous person, Bruno?"

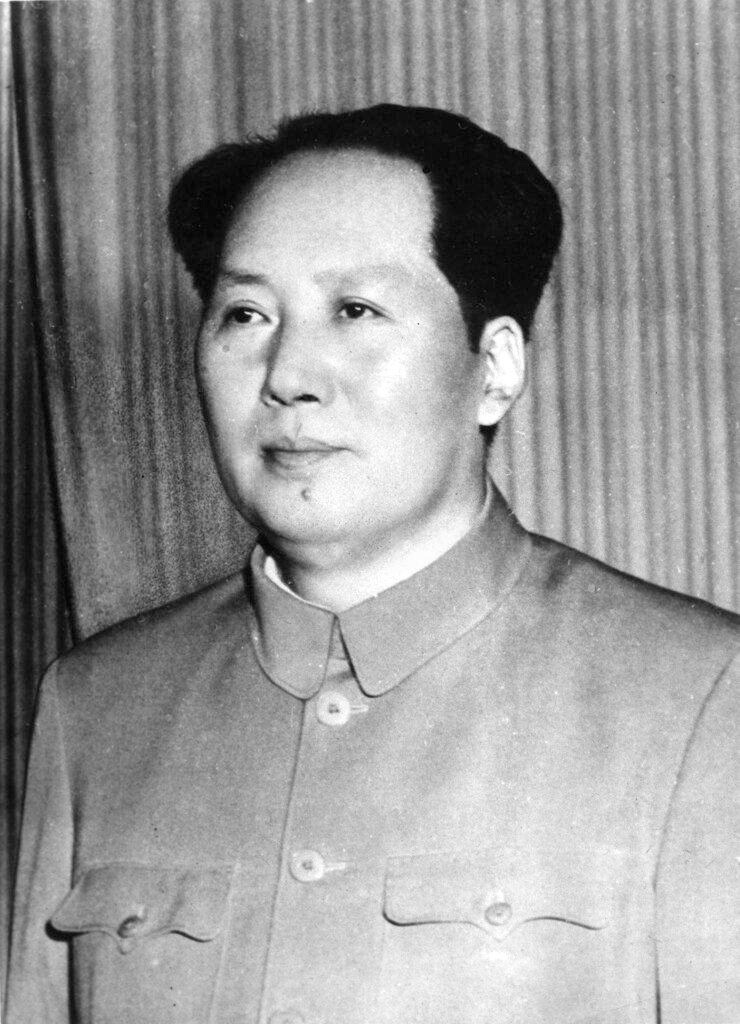
Portrait of Mao Tse-tung, 1950

At the time, Mao's image was widely publicized; he appeared on the March 3, 1972, cover of Life, and President Richard Nixon had a widely televised visit to China a month earlier, the first by an American president and a historic turning point in U.S.-China relations. Bischofberger initially expressed concern that a portrait of a Communist leader would be difficult to sell, but Warhol argued that since Nixon had recently visited Mao, the painting would likely be acceptable to prominent collectors.

The project marked Warhol's return to painting after a period focused on filmmaking and was one of his most ambitious bodies of work since the Flowers series of the mid-1960s. In making hundreds of images of Mao, Warhol drew on a widely circulated portrait of the chairman by Chinese artist Zhang Zhenshi, later used for the book Quotations from Chairman Mao Tse-Tung (also known as Little Red Book). Warhol transformed a political and propagandistic symbol into a commodity-like portrait that blurred the distinctions between celebrity culture, political iconography, and mass-produced imagery.

== Production ==
Warhol began painting the first group of eleven Mao paintings in March 1972. Measuring 82 × 62 inches, these early works are modest in scale, featuring Mao in a consistent color palette with a complementary blue background and a striking red on his lips. Later that year, in November and December, Warhol produced four much larger works at 177 × 137 inches.

A set of 1972 Mao screenprints

He lightened the palette, introducing paler blues and grays, and shifted Mao's face from pink to yellow, while applying minimal feathered black brushstrokes to the edges of the background, which created a commanding presence. Continuing into 1973, Warhol explored additional sizes in which heavy, swirling brushstrokes around Mao's head and clothing dominate the composition.

For the portfolio of screenprints, Warhol produced 10 prints, each measuring 36 × 36 inches, issued in an edition of 250.

== Exhibitions ==
The exhibition Andy Warhol: Mao, Ten Portraits of Mao Tse-Tung was mounted at Kunstmuseum in Basel in October 1972.

In November 1972, Mao Prints was displayed at the Leo Castelli Gallery in New York.

In January 1973, Warhol's exhibition of 10 Mao prints opened at the Current Editions Gallery in Seattle. That month, a set of prints were also displayed at the John Berggruen Gallery in San Francisco.

Warhol's exhibition of Mao portraits opened at the Musée Galliera in Paris on February 22, 1974. Four twenty-foot-high portraits were displayed side by side in the grand hall, which had been covered in Warhol's white-and-lavender Mao wallpaper. The smaller salons were also wallpapered and filled with medium-sized paintings, Mao prints, and, in one room, one hundred miniature Mao paintings, resembling a series of Oriental postage stamps.

After the death of Mao Tse-tung in September 1976, the Freeman-Anacker Gallery in New Orleans displayed 10 screenprints and a small painting as a memorial and tribute.

In November 1979, curator and collector David Whitney assembled three of the four giant Mao paintings in the retrospective Andy Warhol: Portraits of the 70s at the Whitney Museum of American Art in New York City.

== Critical reception ==
When exhibited in New York, Zurich, and Paris, Warhol's Mao paintings were met with widespread acclaim. Former Interview editor Bob Colacello noted, "They were controversial, commercial, and important, just like the man they portrayed and the man who painted them. And they were all about power: the power of one man over the lives of one billion people."

Editor Jeanne Metzger of The Everett Herald, wrote the Mao prints are "powerful, great and beautiful." She added by "introducing color changes in the background, faces and uniform in each picture he is able to change the mood of the portrait."

Art critic Thomas Albright of the San Francisco Chronicle wrote: "Idea-wise, the message seems to be that even so militantly puritanical and anti-capitalistic a figure as Chairman Mao can be transformed into a commercial object to grace the walls of decadent, bourgeois living rooms (or museums). The most interesting things about these prints, however, are their surfaces, on which the colors have been casually laid to create richly varied textures that range from screen-dotted transparencies to thick, deep 'glazes,' and loose, brushy effects that remarkably resemble painting. Warhol truly is a master silkscreen printer, and the Mao set is a virtuoso demonstration of technique."

== Collections ==
In 1974, fashion designer Halston acquired ten miniature Mao paintings from Warhol for about $2,000 each. Warhol also gifted actress Paulette Goddard a miniature Mao painting that year. He also gave a Mao to his longtime partner Jed Johnson, which was inherited by his twin brother Jay Johnson after Johnson's death in 1996 and later acquired by Thomas Ammann Fine Art in Zurich. Actor Dennis Hopper owned a 1972 Mao screenprint, which he reportedly shot in a fit of paranoia.

A large Mao (1972), measuring nearly 15 feet long and 11 feet wide, has been in the collection of the Art Institute of Chicago since 1974. The Whitney Museum of American Art in New York has an example depicting Mao in a green tunic against a blue background; donated by collector Peter Brant. The Broad in Los Angeles has another in which Mao's red face blends into the surrounding background and the purple of his tunic.

== Art market ==
In November 2006, Mao (1972), depicting the chairman with yellow cheeks in a dark blue jacket against a light blue background, from the Daros Collection sold for $17.4m, a then-auction record for Warhol, at Christie's in New York.

Following Dennis Hopper's death, his print depicting a blue-faced Mao with green lips against a turquoise background, sold at Christie's in New York for $302,500 in January 2011.

In June 2011, Mao (1973), characterized by violet and purple brushstrokes, sold for £6.9 million ($11.1 million) at Christie's London.

In November 2011, Mao (1973), depicting the chairman wearing a tunic with hues of violet against a crescendo of contrasting greens, yellows, and blues, sold for $3.4 million at Christie's in New York.

In November 2012, Mao (1973), featuring a red tunic with a yellow face accented in red against a background of royal blue hues, was sold by businessman Arpad Busson for $12 million at Phillips in New York.

In November 2015, Mao (1972), depicting the chairman with rouged lips, peach-toned skin, and a navy tunic against a pale blue background sold for $47.5 million at Sotheby's in New York.

In April 2017, a 1973 Mao sold for HK$98.5 million (US$12.6 million) at Sotheby's Hong Kong, setting a then-record price for a work of contemporary art sold in Asia. The painting, featuring a golden-faced Mao against a brown background, had previously sold at Sotheby's London in February 2014 for £7.6 million (US$12.6 million).

In November 2017, Mao (1972), featuring scarlet lips and a golden glow set against a background of variegated blues and teals, and formerly owned by Yoko Ono, sold for $32.4 million at Sotheby's in New York.

In March 2024, a 1972 Mao was stolen from Orange Coast College in Costa Mesa, California. The artwork had been donated to the college in 2020 and stored in the Frank M. Doyle Art Pavilion.

In December 2024, Mao (1973), characterized by contrasting fields of blue, orange, and red was sold for $3.65 million at Heritage Auctions in Dallas.

In May 2025, Mao (1973), featuring a yellow-orange azo face set against an indo orange-red background with a green jacket, from the collection of Leonard and Louise Riggio, sold for $4.6 million at Christie's New York.
