= Archie (dog) =

Andy Warhol and Jed Johnson's dog (1972-c. 1993)

- Archie by Andy Warhol in 1973
- Species: Canis familiaris
- Breed: Dachshund
- Sex: Male
- Born: August 3, 1972
- Died: c. 1993–1994 (aged 21)
- Known for: Andy Warhol's pet
- Owners: Andy Warhol; Jed Johnson
- Named after: Archie Bunker

Archie (August 3, 1972 – c. 1993), also known as Archie Bunker, was an American dachshund owned by Pop artist Andy Warhol and interior designer Jed Johnson. Acquired by Warhol and Johnson as a puppy in 1972, Archie became a prominent companion of Warhol. He was frequently photographed and depicted in paintings and drawings by artists including Warhol and Jamie Wyeth. He accompanied Warhol to social events, art openings, restaurants, photoshoots, and press conferences, where Warhol sometimes presented him as his "alter ego."

Archie was a recognizable figure in New York's art and social circles and appeared in newspapers, magazines, advertisements, books, and exhibitions. Warhol frequently carried him in public and described himself as Archie's "stage mother." A few years after they welcomed Archie, Warhol and Johnson got him a playmate, another dachshund named Amos. Archie and Amos reportedly lived to about 21 years old.

== Biography ==
After years of being known for his love of cats—he once had as many as 26—Pop artist Andy Warhol was eventually persuaded by his partner, Jed Johnson, to get a dog. Johnson settled on a male black and tan short-haired dachshund puppy, which they acquired in November 1972. He was named Archie after the wisecracking character Archie Bunker in the popular TV series All in the Family.

Warhol and Johnson doted on Archie, who quickly became part of their social world. In December 1972, Archie accompanied Warhol and Johnson on his first holiday trip, traveling with them to St. Moritz, Switzerland, where they stayed at the Palace Hotel as guests of Gianni and Marella Agnelli. The hotel charged 10 Swiss francs per day for the Archie's stay.

In the spring of 1973, Warhol and Archie traveled to Rome, where Johnson was working with director Paul Morrissey on the films Flesh for Frankenstein (1973) and Blood for Dracula (1974) at Cinecittà Studios. They also visited France and Switzerland. Warhol brought Archie with him to Rome again in August and October 1973 while filming his scenes for The Driver's Seat (1974). By the age of one, Archie had reportedly crossed the Atlantic at least ten times.

Archie became a muse to Warhol, who painted a silkscreen portrait of him with Johnson. Artist Jamie Wyeth also painted a portrait of Archie. Warhol made a portrait of Amos for Archie. Warhol later told the Los Angeles Times that "Archie has a really good beginning (art) collection."

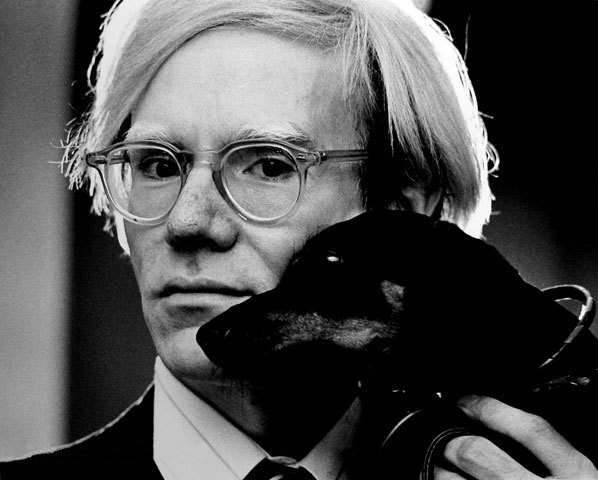
Warhol and Archie by Jack Mitchell at the home of art collectors Ethel and Robert Scull in New York, 1973

Warhol indulged Archie with an eclectic diet that included Quarter Pounders from McDonald's, steak, sautéed liver, and caviar. He even rubbed Joy perfume on him. Archie wore a Tiffany & Co. dog tag and a Hermès leash. Warhol frequently carried him and encouraged him to "talk." He took Archie to the studio, art openings, restaurants, and dinner parties. Warhol also brought him to press conferences as his "alter ego," using Archie to deflect questions he did not want to answer.

Archie gained fame as Warhol's companion and was frequently recognized on the street. His celebrity status enabled him to command a high modeling fee. He often accompanied Warhol to photoshoots, with Warhol describing himself as a self-proclaimed stage mother. The pair posed for renowned photographers including Jack Mitchell, Arnold Newman, Oliviero Toscani, and Milton H. Greene. They appeared in numerous publications, including the New York Daily News, the New York Post, the Associated Press, L'Uomo Vogue, and Esquire. Archie also appeared with Warhol in an advertisement for Pioneer Electronics.

By 1975, Warhol and Johnson had added another dachshund to their family, purchasing a light-brown, short-haired puppy named Amos. Like Archie, Amos became a Prestige Pet. Warhol often referred to him as Archie's dog. In the March 1975 issue of Interview, Warhol told socialite Lee Radziwill that he had acquired Amos as a Christmas present for Archie. He also revealed that Archie had recently mated with a female dachshund who was another Prestige Pet at the store and was "going to be a father." "I took him over and he did his manly duty, and then the next day I brought Amos home, so that confused him, he thinks he got very quick results," Warhol said. According to Vincent Fremont, a member of Warhol's inner circle, "Unlike Archie who enjoyed the company of people and was very social, Amos was more like a regular dog." Amos was later photographed with Johnson and Warhol superstar Geraldine Smith for the February 1976 issue of Interview.

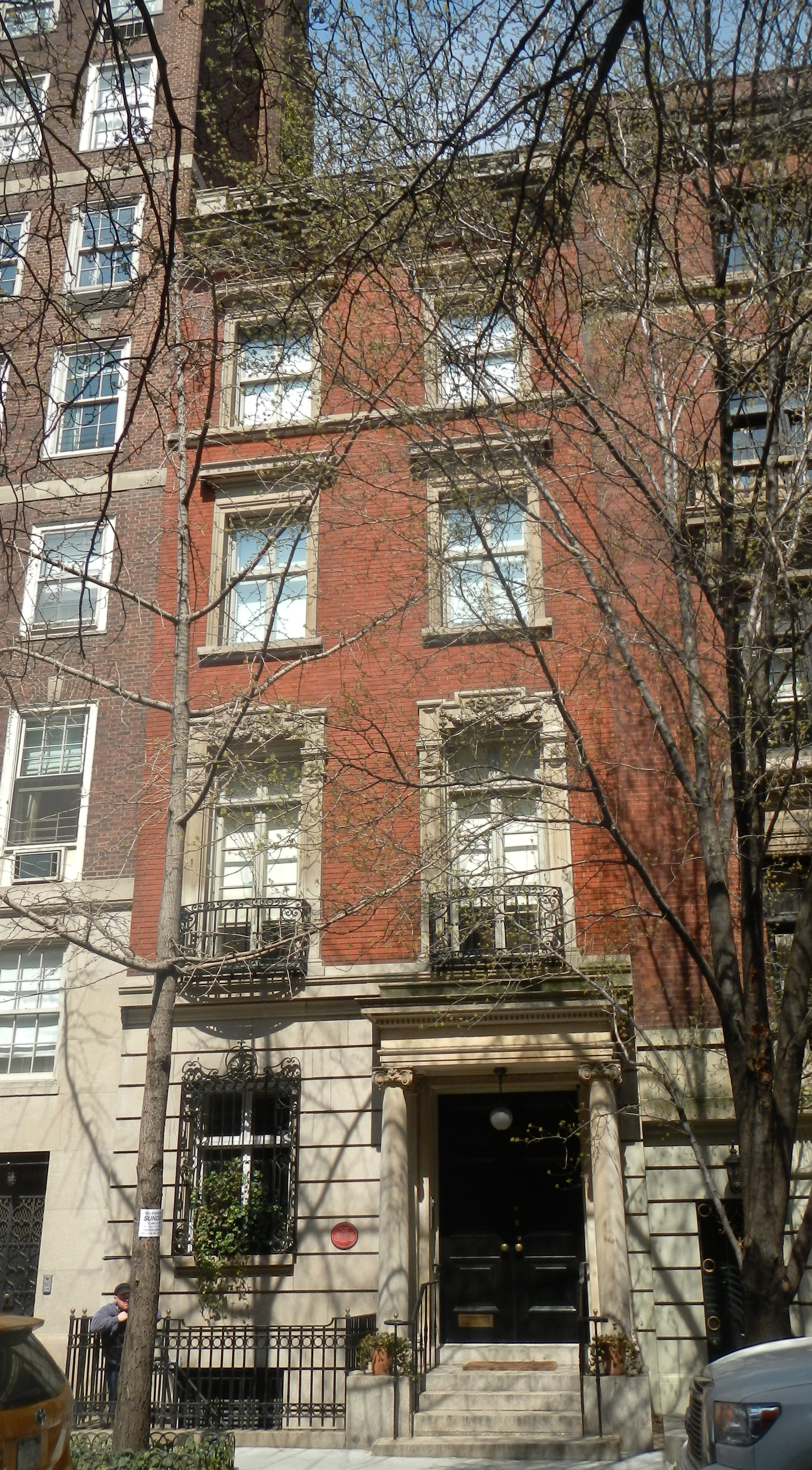
From 1974 to 1987, Archie lived at 57 E 66th St in the Lenox Hill neighborhood of Manhattan. In 1998, the townhouse was designated a cultural landmark.

Eventually, Warhol stopped taking Archie to events, confident that he would be entertained at home with Amos. The dogs lived with Warhol and Johnson at 57 East 66th Street on Manhattan's Upper East Side, where Johnson operated his decorating business from the fourth floor. Archie and Amos regularly rode the elevator in the townhouse. Warhol had amassed a collection of antique furniture for the residence, which Johnson decorated. He also provided the dogs with an extensive collection of toys and used a miniature 19th-century doll bed as their bed.

On August 3, 1980, Warhol recorded in his diary: "It was Archie's birthday and he's eight or nine or even older. I gave him a box of Hartz Mountain treats." After Warhol and Johnson separated in December 1980, they shared custody of Archie and Amos. Johnson would take the dogs for the weekend to his apartment on the Upper West Side of Manhattan. In a December 1986 diary entry, Warhol said:

Archie and Amos were sick last night. Jed picked them up and took them to the doctor's. Ran into him later, he was with Katy Jones, and he was talking about what was wrong with the dogs. They're just really getting old. I told Jed I'd give him one of the Dog paintings. Life's so short and a dog's life is even shorter—they'll both be going to heaven soon.

Archie and Amos outlived Warhol, who died in February 1987 from complications following gallbladder surgery. Johnson subsequently assumed full custody of both dogs.

In 1988, Archie and Amos were photographed with Johnson for the ASPCA benefit exhibition The Four-Footed, Finned or Feathered Four Hundred, which featured photographs of prominent New Yorkers and their pets. The photograph was published in the December 5, 1988 issue of Women's Wear Daily. Archie later appeared with Johnson in the June 1992 issue of Harper's Bazaar. According to Warhol's friend Paige Powell, Archie and Amos "lived to be about 21 years old."

== In popular culture ==
Archie was depicted in numerous works of art and photographs associated with Warhol and his circle. Warhol painted a silkscreen portrait of Archie and Johnson, Jed Johnson with Dachshund (c. 1973). In 1974, artist Martin Hoffman painted Archie and Warhol at the Factory. In 1975, socialite Barbara Allen commissioned Portrait of Archibald by Paula Wright as a Christmas gift for Warhol and Johnson.

Archie was photographed with Warhol by Ellen Graham for her book Growling Gourmet (1976). He was also depicted in paintings and drawings by artist Jamie Wyeth, which were exhibited in Andy Warhol and Jamie Wyeth: Portraits of Each Other at New York's Coe Kerr Gallery in 1976. Drawings of Archie and a painting of Amos appeared in Warhol's Cats and Dogs (1976) series. A photograph of Archie dressed as the Pope was published in Warhol's 1979 book Exposures.

A 1975 photograph of Archie by Peter Hujar was later published in Black and White Dogs (1992), edited by Jean-Claude Suarès. In 2006, Jack Mitchell's 1973 photograph of Warhol and Archie was included in the exhibition Icons & Idols at the Delaware Art Museum. In 2022, Warhol's mixed-media work Archie, the Dachshund was included in the exhibition A Thousand Hounds: A Walk with Dogs Through the History of Photography at the UBS Paine Webber Art Gallery in New York.

== See also ==
- List of individual dogs
