= Institute of Contemporary Art (Miami) =

Institute of Contemporary Art, Miami, also known as ICA Miami, is a contemporary art museum located in the Miami Design District in Miami, Florida, United States.

== History ==
Institute of Contemporary Art first opened in 1996 under the Museum of Contemporary Art in a building designed by Charles Gwathmey. The Museum of Contemporary Art, North Miami remains at the initial location.

In 2014, due to issues of zoning, the museum's board sued the city for the right to move, leading to the establishment of the Institute of Contemporary Art in 2017 in the current location in Miami's Design District.

In 2024, the museum acquired the former site of the neighbouring De la Cruz Collection for $25 million, adding 30,000 square feet of exhibition space; the purchase was funded by contributions from dozens of South Florida philanthropists, including developer and Design District co-founder Craig Robins.

== Architecture ==
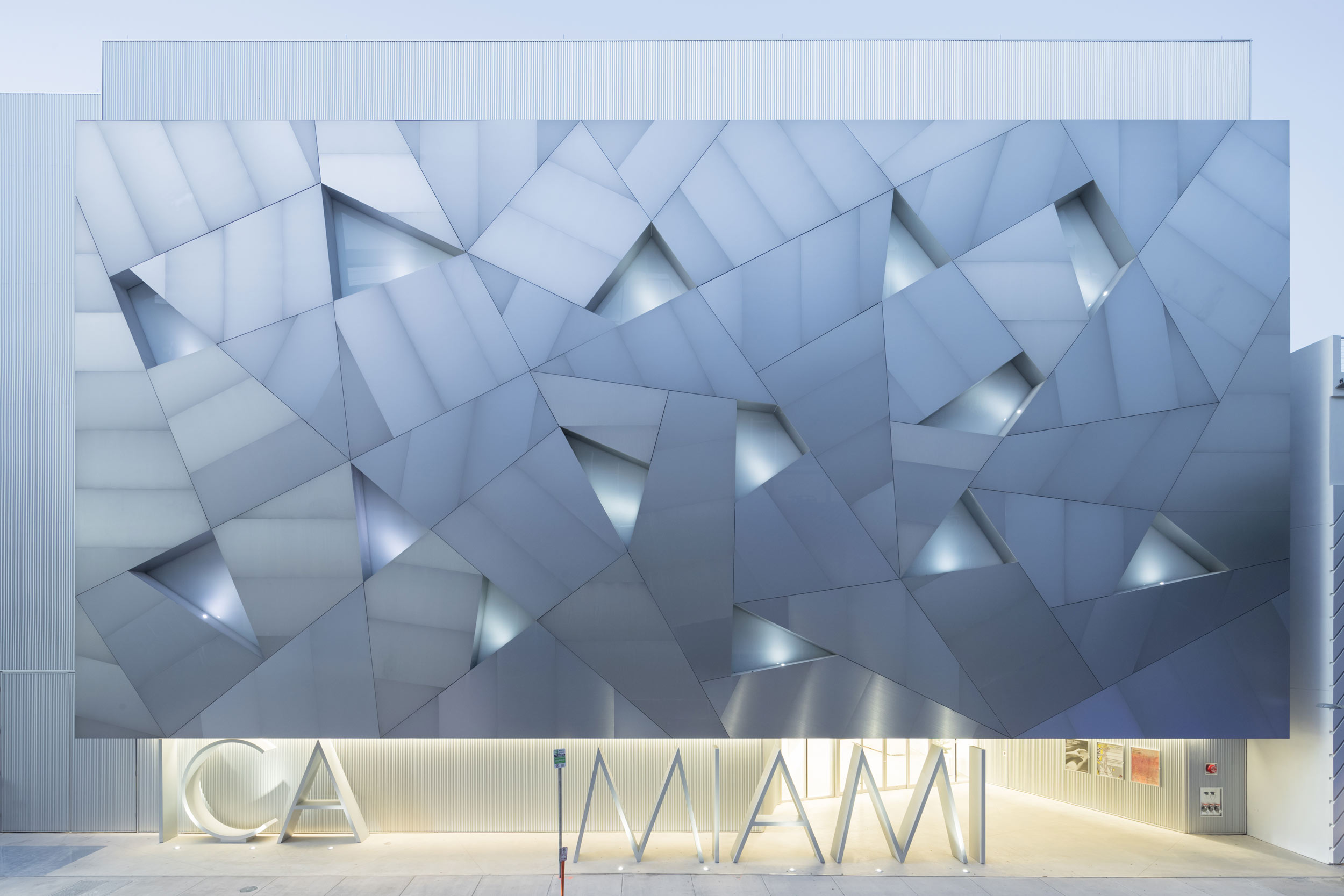
ICA Miami: view from the front

Funded by Norman Braman and his wife, who remains co-chair on the board of trustees at ICA, the architectural design of the museum's building is an integral part of the museum's reputation. Designed in 2017 by Aranguren & Gallegos architects, the building was constructed to mimic a "Magic Box" with its bright and geometrically shape and texture. The building consists of 37,500 square feet of space, including its exterior. Three stories tall, with 20,000 feet of gallery space to house the various exhibitions and permanent collection, as well as a sculpture garden in the back, the structure borders the residential neighbourhood adjacent to the Design District. The back side of the structure is lined with windows to keep sunshine coming through the building, and to give any visitors a chance to see the sculpture garden that lies below the rows of windows. The 15,000-foot sculpture garden is home to works by Mark Handforth, Abigail DeVille, Allora and Calzadilla, and Pedro Reyes. The building was visualised as a sort of magnet, both literally and figuratively. Not only was the concept of attracting the public with a geometrical design important to the concept, but the facade of the building itself can be compared to the dark grey and smooth material of any magnet.

== Permanent collection ==
As is true for much of the museum's art, Institute of Contemporary Art, Miami's permanent collection seeks to reflect efforts to expose new talent, while also showcasing many well known artists.^{[10]} The collection include works from many different artists including Rita Ackermann, Francis Alÿs, Hernan Bas, Louise Bourgeois, William Copley, Ann Craven, Jose Antonio Hernandez Diez, Inka Essenhigh, Allan McCollum, Mark Handforth, Jim Hodges, Nancy and Edward Kienholz, Guillermo Kuitca, Zoe Leonard, John Miller, Malcom Morley, Chris Ofili, Gabriel Orozco, Enoc Perez, Raymond Pettibon, Robert Therrien, Gisela McDaniel, and James Turrell.

== Exhibitions ==
With its opening in December 2017, Institute of Contemporary Art, Miami provided another exhibition platform for Miami Art Basel, a critically acclaimed cultural attraction to the city. Various artists had work shown at the opening, such as Abigail DeVille's work in the sculpture garden, Tomm el-Saieh, Senga Nengudi, Edward and Nancy Kienholz, and Hélio Oiticica. Furthermore, ICA introduced "The Everywhere Studio." The exhibition, which was curated by Alex Gartenfeld, artistic director of the museum, Gean Moreno, program curator for the museum, and Stephanie Seidel. The Everywhere studio was considered to be the most notable portion of the museum's opening. It showcased more than 100 works from more than fifty artists spanning over the past five decades. The exhibition became known for its mixing of well known and unknown artists and wide variety of time and location explored. Pablo Picasso and Roy Lichtenstein, both well-known artist from the mid 20th century, were showcased amongst far lesser known Miami artists.

Since its opening exhibitions, the museum has housed many different exhibitions. In April 2018, Donald Judd was represented in "Donald Judd: Paintings," an exhibition that showcased 14 of Judd's paintings from the years 1959 to 1961. Within the same month, exhibitions by Walter Darby Bannard and Francis Alÿs opened to the public. Later, in May 2018, ICA Miami focused on Diamond Stingily in the artist's first solo show, "Diamond Stingily: Life In My Pocket." The multi-media exhibition drew large crowds at its opening. Simultaneously, an exhibit of Terry Adkins' work opened in one of the museum's exhibition spaces. "Terry Adkins: Infinity Is Always Less Than One" comprised more than 50 works from throughout the artist's life. In July 2018, Sondra Perry's exhibition, "Sondra Perry: Typhoon Coming On," was opened to the public. Perry's exhibition used multiple forms of media to "explore the intersection of black identity, digital culture and power." Also opened in July 2018, ICA Miami created a space for works by Louise Bourgeois. With one of the artist's works already in the museum's permanent collection, the exhibition focuses on Bourgeois' other notable sculptures. In early November 2018, ICA Miami curated Manuel Solano's exhibition, "Manuel Solano:I Don't Wanna Wait For Our Lives To Be Over." "Larry Bell: Time Machine," also opened in November, surveys many of Larry Bell's various works, from his early works to the glass sculptures and works he is generally known for.

== Programs ==
Apart from exhibitions across various artistic platforms, the Institute of Contemporary Art, Miami is also known for the various programs and services it provides. ICA Ideas build upon the current exhibitions available to the public with different classes and speeches, and providing a platform for additional performances. Through this program, for example, Charles Gaines composed a performance for the museum's crowd entitled A Visual Recital. ICA Speaks is one of the museum's programs that invites associated artists to give speeches or organise symposiums regarding the various permanent works displayed in the space. Panels and speeches from artists such as Mark Handforth and Hernan Bas have been arranged for purposes of explanation and audience engagement. ICA Performs consists of various dance, theatre, and other performing art programs that put on showcases in various parts of the museum. The museum has collaborated with performance artists such as Michael Clark and Trisha Brown to provide museum-goers with live performances. Lastly, ICA Residents is an inaugural program that was dedicated to exposure of local musicians. The various events were in partnership with Miami Music Club, and they were centred around the idea of pairing local Miami artists with non-local artists in a singular showcase. The headliners were artists such as Drew McDowall, Via App and Profligate.

== Management ==
Overseeing the construction of the current permanent venue, Ellen Salpeter joined as director of the museum in December 2015. In early 2018, Ellen Salpeter, director of ICA Miami since 2015, stepped down. Taking Salpeter's place, Alex Gartenfeld, the deputy director and chief curator, became artistic director in 2018, with Tommy Ralph Pace taking on the role of deputy director. Gartenfeld is also known for his work at the New Museum, where he co-curated the 2018 New Museum Triennial.
