= Ross Bleckner =

American artist

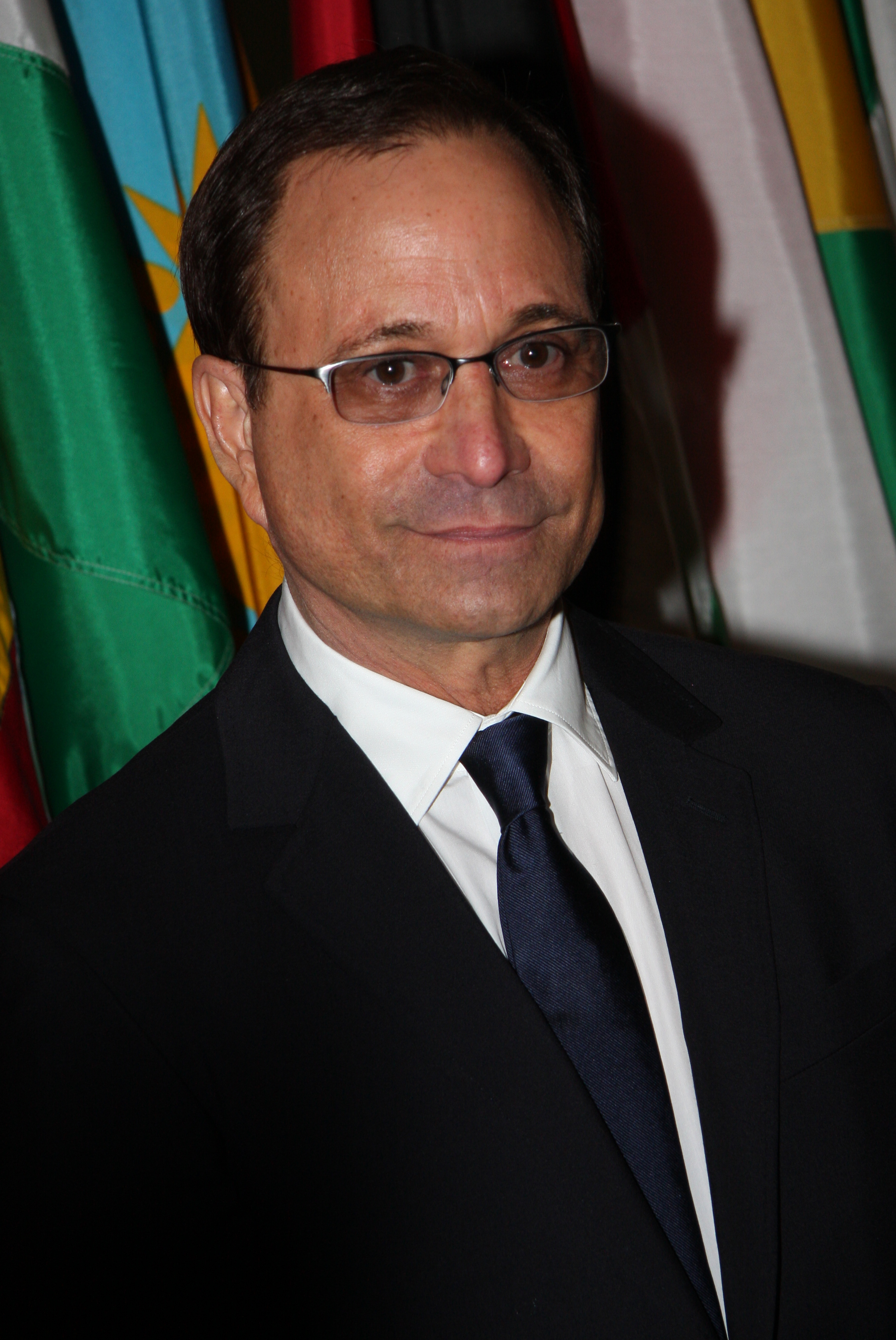
- Bleckner in May 2009
- Born: May 12, 1949 (age 77); New York City
- Education: New York University; California Institute of the Arts
- Known for: Painting

Ross Bleckner (born May 12, 1949) is an American artist. He currently lives and works in New York City. His artistic focus is on painting, and he held his first solo exhibition in 1975. Some of his art work reflected on the AIDS epidemic.

== Early life and education ==
Bleckner was born on May 12, 1949, in Brooklyn, New York and he grew up Jewish. In an interview, Bleckner commented that he was fortunate to have supportive parents. In 1961, Bleckner and his family moved to a more affluent town in Hewlett Harbor, New York, where he attended George W. Hewlett High School. In 1965, Bleckner saw his first art exhibition, The Responsive Eye, at the Museum of Modern Art, which went on to have a huge impact on his artwork. Eventually, this was a time when he realized that he wanted to become an artist. Bleckner went on to study at New York University, where he studied alongside fellow artist Sol LeWitt and Chuck Close. During college, Bleckner worked in an art supply store and drove a taxi. He received his Bachelor of Fine Arts (B.F.A) from New York University (1971), and later received his Master of Fine Arts (M.F.A) at California Institute of the Arts (1973).

== Career ==
In 1974, when Bleckner moved back to New York, he moved into a Tribeca loft building. Three of the floors were rented to the painter Julian Schnabel and from 1977 to 1983 the Mudd Club, a nightclub frequented by musicians and artists, was in the same building. In 2004 Bleckner sold the building. He held his first solo exhibition in 1975 at Cunningham Ward Gallery in New York. Then In 1979 he began what was to become a long association with Mary Boone Gallery in New York. In 1981 Bleckner met Thomas Ammann, who was an influential Swiss art dealer who went on to collect Bleckner's work.

Early 1990s, Bleckner did his first painting called Cell painting which showed an example of human body cell diseases. Since either the 1980s or 1990s as an openly gay artist, his art has been largely an investigation of change, loss, and memory, often addressing the subject of AIDS. Bleckner uses symbolic imagery rather than direct representation, and his work is visually elusive, with forms that constantly change focus. While much of Bleckner's work can be divided into distinct groups or series with motifs repeated from painting to painting, he is also in the habit of redeploying and combining old motifs.

One of Bleckner's earliest artwork that reflected the AIDS epidemic was a painting called Small Count (1990). In this painting, few white dot patterns are painted over a dark canvas. Some of the dots are bright white, while others look like it is fading. The white dots were painted to represent the white blood cells being destroyed by AIDS. Other well-known paintings related to the AIDS epidemic are 8,122+ As of January 1986, and Throbbing Heart (1994). In the painting, 8,122+ As of January 1986, the numbers 8, 1, 2, & 2 in red are painted on the four corners respectively. The number refers to the number of people who had died from AIDS at that point in history. Throbbing Heart (1994) has red splotchlike patterns painted over a dark canvas. The patterns resemble the purple marks of Kaposi's sarcoma. He shows how real life is through his artwork, and how it’s like being an artist and how that affects the artist and the work they show. Bleckner doesn’t consider his work to be morbid, he sees it as life, we’re born, we live, we die. Bleckner has posited that a painting is never finished, provided it is still in his studio, because it can always be improved.

== Published writings ==
In 2009, Bleckner published a book of his theoretical art statements entitled Examined Life: Writings, 1972-2007 that was published by Edgewise Press.

== Exhibitions ==
In 1995, the Solomon R. Guggenheim Museum had a major retrospective of his works from the last two decades of exhibitions at acclaimed institutions such as San Francisco Museum of Modern Art, Moderna Museet in Stockholm, and the Carnegie Museum of Art. He was one of the youngest artists to be featured at the Guggenheim.

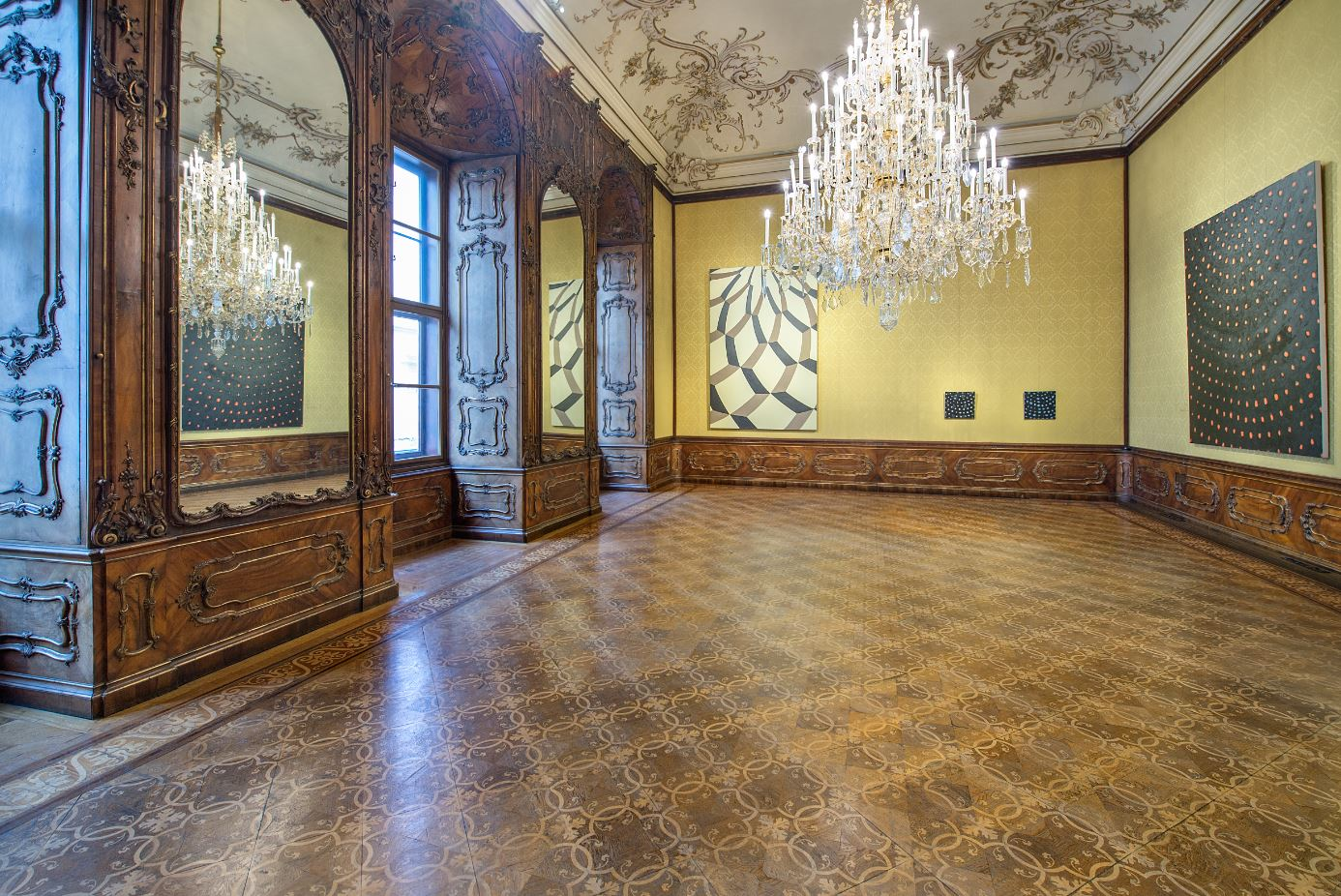
Ross Bleckner 2018 at W&K - Wienerroither & Kohlbacher in Vienna

== Collections ==
Bleckner's works are held in collections around the world including Museum of Modern Art, New York, Los Angeles Museum of Contemporary Art, Collezione Maramotti Museum, Reggio, Italy, San Francisco Museum of Modern Art, the Jewish Museum, New York, Astrup Fearnley Museum of Modern Art, Oslo, Norway, Museo Nacional Centro de Arte Reina Sofía, Madrid, Spain, and the Whitney Museum of American Art, New York, among others.

== Philanthropy ==
Through his philanthropic efforts, Bleckner has enabled many community organizations to perform their vital work. He is on the board of AIDS Community Research Initiative of America (ACRIA), a non-profit community-based AIDS research and treatment education center. Bleckner is currently a Clinical Professor of Studio Art at New York University's Steinhardt School of Culture, Education, and Human Development.

In May 2009 Bleckner was awarded the title of Goodwill Ambassador by the United Nations Office on Drugs and Crime (UNODC). He was the first fine artist to receive the position. Later that year Bleckner travelled to Gulu, Uganda to work with former children soldiers and abductees. Together the children and Bleckner created portraits and paintings, which were sold at a United Nations benefit and through his exhibition, Welcome to Gulu, at Lehmann Maupin Gallery. Proceeds raised were used to aid to UNODC's effort to stop human trafficking in Uganda.

== Personal life ==
Bleckner has been living in New York's West Village since 2004. In 1993, he bought Truman Capote’s modern beach house on a five-acre property in Sagaponack, New York, for $800,000, then owned by The Nature Conservancy. Over 20 years and two major renovations, he doubled the house's size, and had a matching 1,900 square-foot studio built on an adjoining field.

In 2018, Bleckner sued his former assistant Cody Gilman in the United States District Court for the Southern District of New York, accusing him of attempting to extort $2 million by threatening to portray their consensual relationship as a case of sexual harassment. Shortly after, Gilman’s lawsuit was first filed in the United States District Court for the Eastern District of New York, in which he sought a trial by jury, remuneration for lost wages and damages as a consequence of unwanted sexual advances, harassment and assault. Bleckner’s lawsuit was terminated in 2019 and consolidated with Gilman’s action. In 2020, the lawsuit was settled out of court for an undisclosed amount and dismissed with prejudice.
