= Thomas Ammann =

Swiss art dealer and collector (1950–1993)

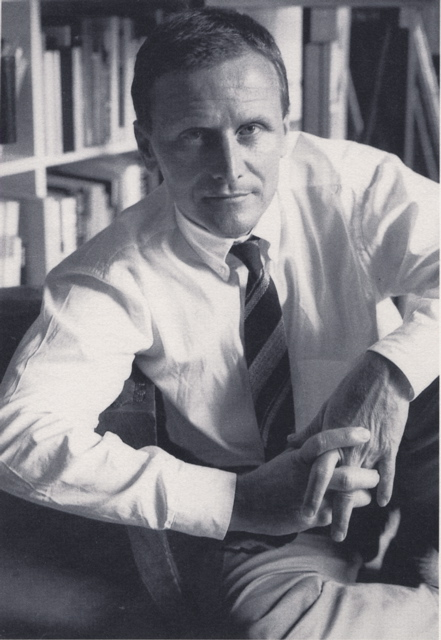
- Born: February 2, 1950; Ermatingen, Switzerland
- Died: June 9, 1993 (aged 43); Zurich, Switzerland
- Resting place: Friedhof Fluntern, Zurich
- Occupation: Art dealer

Thomas E. Ammann (February 2, 1950 – June 9, 1993) was a leading Swiss art dealer and collector. Regarded as the leading dealer of his generation, he specialized in Impressionism and 20th-century art. He was also a collector of post-war and contemporary art. In recognition of his exquisite sense of style, he was inducted into the International Best Dressed Hall of Fame List in 1988.

== Early life ==
Thomas Ammann was born on February 2, 1950 in Ermatingen, Switzerland to a conservative Swiss-German family. He had three older sisters: Eveline, Doris (1944–2021), and Susan. His parents operated a transport business and had little interest in art.

Ammann developed a love of art at a young age, and by the time he was eight years old, he was routinely duplicating Vincent van Gogh's paintings.

As a teenager, Ammann became interested in collecting art. He had been enthralled with Appenzell folk art. Particularly the little pieces created by traveling painters that farmers in the 19th century would carry to their cottages in the alpine meadows where they would spend the summer. Thomas started buying items from farmers, and this piqued his attention more than attending school.

== Career ==
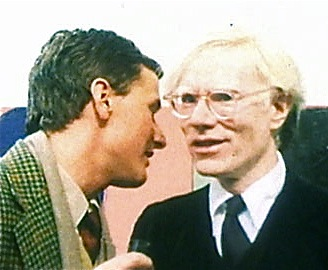
Ammann and Warhol in Zurich, 1976

At the age of 18, he went to work at Swiss art dealer Bruno Bischofberger's gallery in Zurich. Although Amann started off working in the folk art section of Bischofberger's establishment, he eventually shifted to the contemporary art section. He frequently traveled to New York, where he formed friendships with notable figures in the art world.

In 1977, Ammann went into the art business for himself and founded the Thomas Ammann Fine Art with his sister Doris Ammann. He also initiated the Andy Warhol Catalogue Raisonné in 1977. Ammann became a close friend of pop artist Andy Warhol. He would take Warhol to gay bars during his visits to Zurich.

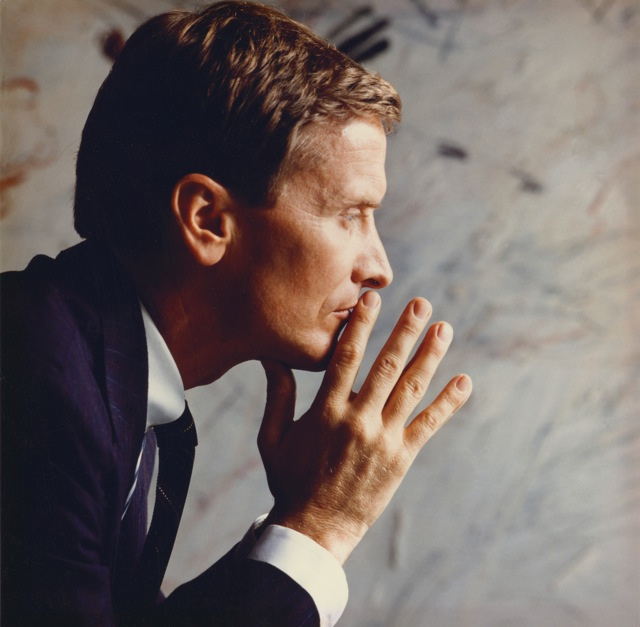
Thomas Ammann in Zurich, 1991

His combination of knowledge, eye for quality, charm, humor, looks, and discretion took him to the top of the art world by his mid-30s. He was frequently listed as one of the best-dressed men in the world. In 1988, a feature of him in Vanity Fair with the heading "Ammann of Style" stated that he "skis with Valentino, dines with Audrey Hepburn and Elizabeth Taylor… and lives on Concorde."

== Death ==
Ammann died on June 9, 1993, at the age of 43, of an AIDS related illness at the Bircher-Benner Clinic in Zurich. A memorial service was held at the Church of St. Peter in Zurich. Another memorial service was held at The Solomon R. Guggenheim Museum in New York City on November 18, 1993, with speakers Patricia Phelps de Cisneros, Thomas Krens, William H. Luers, Ernst Beyeler, Robert Wilson, Bob Colacello, Bianca Jagger, and artists Ross Bleckner, Francesco Clemente, and Eric Fischl.

He is buried at Friedhof Fluntern cemetery in Zurich.

== Thomas Ammann Fine Art ==
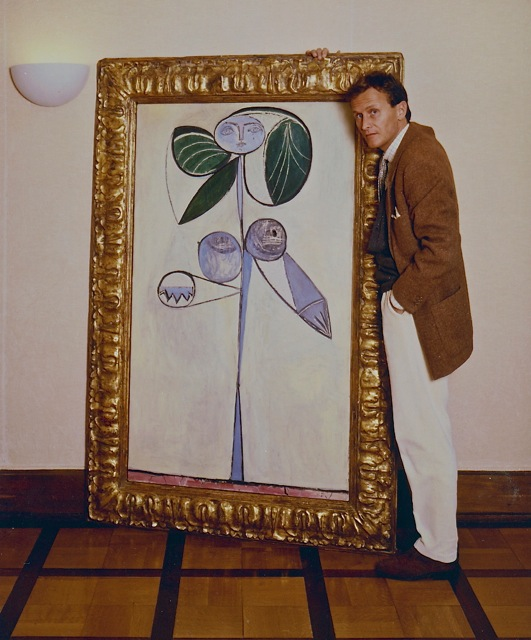
Thomas Ammann at his Zurich gallery, 1989

In 1977, Ammann co-founded Thomas Ammann Fine Art with his sister Doris Amann (1944–2021). The gallery specialized in modern art and impressionist works created between 1870 and 1960. Its patrons included Giovanni Agnelli, Gustavo Cisneros, David Geffen, Ronald Lauder, Dinos Martinos, Samuel Newhouse Jr, Stavros Niarchos, Ronald Perelman, Yves Saint Laurent and Baron Hans Heinrich Thyssen-Bornemisza.

From his villa by Otto Rudolf Salvisberg on the hill of Zurich, his chalet in Gstaad or his apartment at the Pierre in New York, Ammann dealt works by artists including Francis Bacon, Balthus, Max Beckmann, Constantin Brâncuși, Georges Braque, Alexander Calder, Alberto Giacometti, Wassily Kandinsky, Ernst Ludwig Kirchner, Paul Klee, Willem de Kooning, Fernand Léger, Henri Matisse, Joan Miró, Barnett Newman, Pablo Picasso and Mark Rothko.

Due to Ammann's discretion and secrecy in business, only a few prime examples of artworks which found way into the world's great museums through his hands are known, such as Max Ernst's The Blessed Virgin Chastises the Infant Jesus Before Three Witnesses in the collection of the Ludwig Museum in Cologne or Vincent van Gogh's Portrait of Joseph Roulin which Ammann sold to the Museum of Modern Art in New York. Ammann was a major player in the international art auctions in London and New York. The press noted "his presence in the world's salesrooms created a mood of optimism, whatever the market conditions, and his enthusiastic bids for paintings by Cy Twombly and Andy Warhol were driven by genuine passion as much as potential profit".

Doris Ammann worked as the financial administrator until her brother died in 1993. Thomas Ammann Fine Art exclusively represents the work of Brice Marden in Europe and since 1999, works closely with The Willem de Kooning Foundation, New York and represents the artist's work in Europe.

== Personal life ==
=== Art collection ===
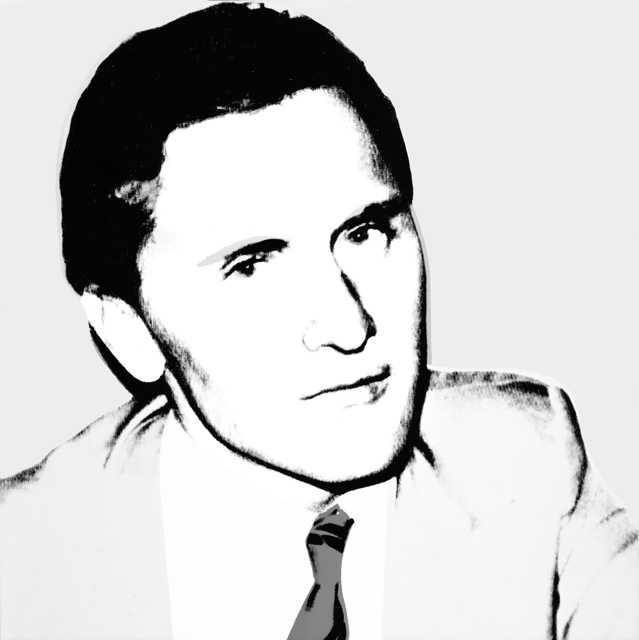
Warhol Portrait of Thomas Ammann

Ammann was a keen supporter and friend of contemporary artists, whose works he exclusively purchased for his own collection. He said in 1988, "what really interests me about collecting is seeing what's happening today. I like to buy young people, and I buy them very early." Several artists, like Ross Bleckner, Francesco Clemente, and Philip Taaffe, had Thomas's backing from the beginning of their careers helped launch their careers internationally.

Living up to his maxim "You shall not collect what you want to sell." Ammann strictly divided his dealings in early 20th-century art from his collecting of postwar and contemporary works. His collection of works included an unmatched group of artists like Andy Warhol, Cy Twombly, Brice Marden, Robert Ryman, Sigmar Polke, Eric Fischl, Francesco Clemente, and Willem de Kooning, which was regarded by the art world as one of the best in existence.

A small selection of his collection was exhibited at the Kunsthalle Basel in 1985 with the title "From Twombly to Clemente - Selected works from a private collection", curated by the well-known art critic and former museum director Jean-Christophe Ammann (no relation).

The funding for his collection was provided by his childhood friend and fellow art enthusiast Alexander Schmidheiny, who shared with him the goal of establishing a first-rate collection of contemporary art. Following the untimely deaths of Schmidheiny in 1992 and Ammann in 1993, the collection was inherited by their siblings. Doris Ammann exhibits some of the inherited works as private loans, while Stephan Schmidheiny transferred his share to the newly created Daros Collection.

=== Philanthropy ===
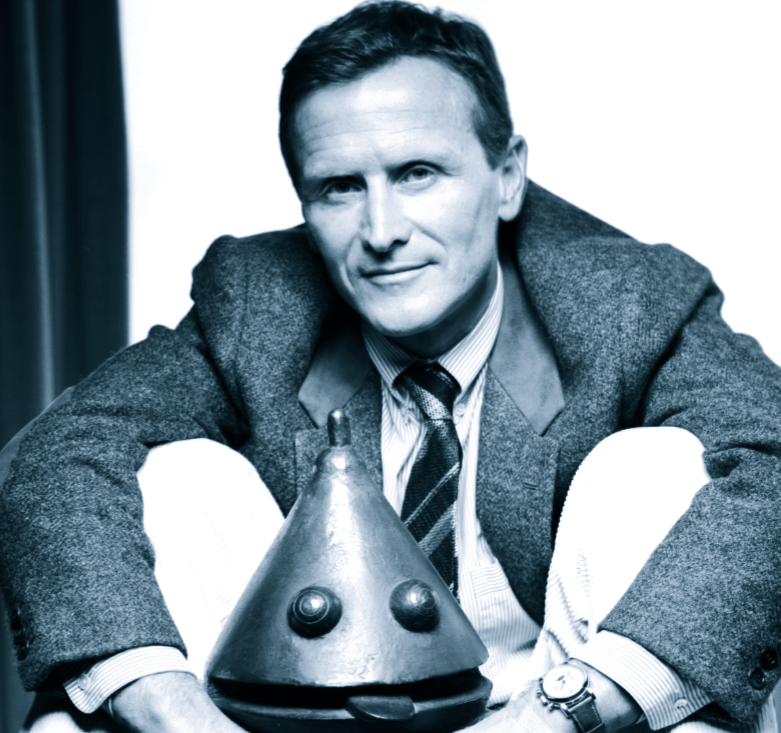
Thomas Ammann with Max Ernst's "Mon ami Pierrot"

Ammann was an early supporter in the fight against AIDS. On May 2, 1988, Ammann orchestrated a benefit auction that raised nearly $2 million. Ammann convinced his artist friends from Jasper Johns to Cy Twombly to donate works to the auction he co-hosted with Patricia Buckley, the proceeds of which went to the supportive care programme of St. Vincent's Hospital and Medical Center of New York.

In 1991, as chairman of the international programme, Ammann organized and hosted the Art Against Aids (amfAR) gala dinner and a $1.5 million fund-raiser at the opening of the art fair Basel with Elizabeth Taylor and Audrey Hepburn for some 500 guests, among them the biggest names from the art and entertainment worlds.

== Legacy ==
His sister Doris Ammann left a will directing that the Thomas Ammann Fine Art gallery's art collection be transferred to a foundation and liquidated for charitable purposes after her death. In 2021, the Thomas & Doris Ammann Foundation was established.
