= Mark Handforth =

American sculptor

Mark Handforth (born in Hong Kong 1969) is a sculptor based in Miami, Florida. Some of his works are attributed to site-specific art. In 2007 he installed a sculpture titled Dallas Snake in the park of the Dallas Museum of Art. Four works are exhibited outside the Museum of Contemporary Art, Chicago through October 2011.

== Education ==
Handforth grew up in London, England, and attended Staatliche Hochschule für Bildende Künste, Städelschule, Frankfurt am Main, Germany, and the Slade School of Fine Art at University College London. Handforth moved to Miami, Florida, in 1992.

== Work ==
Often focusing on large-scale sculpture, Handforth’s work reflects objects from public spaces—street signs, fluorescent lights, street lamps, and traffic cones. These objects are then altered as Handforth twists and bends them, covers some with wax from burning candles or dripping paint. A feature of many of Handforth’s exhibitions is his placement of works in a gallery space and the continuation of the exhibition outdoors, in front of or near the gallery or museum.

Handforth also works with fluorescent light tubes, creating representations of such things suns, stars, lightning bolts, or abstract designs placed on gallery walls. His work is often described as Minimalist, and his light sculptures are reminiscent of Dan Flavin’s work. His oversized sculptures reflect elements of Claes Oldenburg’s large-scale sculptures. Some critics also identify elements of Pop Art and Surrealism in his work. Handforth often takes objects from popular culture—such as a Vespa or a satellite dish—and turns them into art objects by reappropriating their use. Other cultural icons prominent in Handforth's work—the heart, star, and stop sign—are references to Pop Art.

The Public Art Fund sponsored Handforth's Lamppost (2003), which was installed at the Doris Freedman Plaza in Midtown Manhattan. Lamppost was the first of many outdoor works in his series of twisted and bent lampposts. The industrial lamppost was bent in two places so it would rest on the ground, and it lit the public space with glowing, red lights.

Wishbone (2010) is a 7-½ foot tall aluminum sculpture on display outside of the Hessel Museum at Bard (2011). Handforth digitally enlarged an image of a chicken wishbone to produce the massive sculpture.

=== Selected works ===
- Vespa, 2001
- Lamppost, 2003, first displayed at the Doris Freedman Plaza in Midtown Manhattan, NY
- Western Sun, 2004, Pérez Art Museum Miami
- Diamond Brite, 2004, first displayed at the Whitney Biennial
- Northern Star, 2005
- Stardust, 2005
- Platz, 2007, on display Tessinerplaz, Zürich
- Man on the Moon, 2009, first displayed at the 53rd International Art Exhibition, Venice, Italy
- Wishbone, 2010
- Blackbird, 2011

=== Selected collections ===
- Dallas Museum of Art
- Le Consortium
- FRAC Centre
- Francois Pinault Collection
- Museum of Contemporary Art, North Miami
- Museum of Contemporary Art, Los Angeles
- Pérez Art Museum Miami
- Rachofsky Collection
- Rubell Family Collection
- Whitney Museum of American Art

== Exhibitions ==
Handforth’s first solo museum show in the United States was held in 1996 the Museum of Contemporary Art, North Miami. The exhibition Mark Handforth: Rolling Stop was also the museum’s first Miami-based artist to receive a solo show. He exhibits at the museum again in 2011–2012.

Handforth's first solo show in the United Kingdom was in 2004 at The Modern Institute in Glasgow, Scotland, which again held exhibitions of his work in 2006 and 2010. The exhibition presented works such as Fire, neon light tubes mounted on a gallery wall; Volcano, a tree stump covered in colored wax from candles alight atop it; and Left, an oversized street sign bent into an S-shape.

Mark Handforth's outdoor exhibition (2011) on the Museum of Contemporary Art, Chicago’s plaza displays three large-scale and one small-scale work: PhoneBone combines an oversized femur set upright with an equally oversized yellow phone handset affixed to the bone’s side; LamppostSnake and Blackbird—a large, bent lamppost and a massive black aluminum hanger, respectively—sit atop the building’s plinths on either side of the staircase; BeatProp displays an English Bobby hat atop a safety cone, each colored with dripped paint.

=== Selected solo exhibitions ===
- 2011 Museum of Contemporary Art (MCA) Chicago Plaza Project
- 2010 Gavin Brown’s enterprise, New York
- 2008 Galerie Almine Rech, Paris
- 2007 Plaz, Galerie Eva Presenhuber/Tessinerplatz, Zurich
- 2006 The Modern Institute, offsite, Glasgow, Scotland
- 2005 Stroom, The Haghe, Netherlands
- 2004 Roma Roma Roma, Rome
- 2003 Lamppost, a Public Art Fund commission, New York, NY
- 2002 UCLA Hammer Museum, Los Angeles, CA
- 1997 Miami Arts Project, four bus shelters for Metro-Dade Art in Public Places, Miami, FL
- 1991 Galerie Krieg, Frankfurt am Main, Germany

=== Selected group exhibitions ===
- 2010 At Home/Not at Home, Hessel Museum of Art, New York, NY
- 2009 Tonite, The Modern Institute, Glasgow, Scotland
- 2008 The Freak Show, Musee de la Monnaie, Paris, France
- 2007 From Site to Site: Light Art in Parks, Villas, and Museums, Internationale Lichttage Winterthur, Switzerland
- 2006 The Uncertainty of Objects and Ideas, Hirshhorn Museum and Sculpture Garden, Washington, D.C.
- 2005 Light Art from Artificial Light, ZKM Museum for Contemporary Art, Karlsruhe, Germany
- 2004 Terminal 5, JKF Airport, New York, NY
- 2004 Whitney Biennial, Whitney Museum of American Art, New York, NY
- 2003 It Happened Tomorrow, Lyon Biennale, Lyon, France
- 2002 My head is on fire but my heart is full of love, Charlottenborg Exhibition Hall, Copenhagen, Denmark

== Biography ==
- 1969 Born in Hong Kong
- 1990–1991 Staatliche Hochschule fur Bildende Kunste, Städelschule, Frankfurt am Main
- 1988–1992 The Slade School of Fine Art, University College, London
- 1992–Present Lives and works in Miami, FL

== Literature ==
- 2006 The New Yorker, May 23, 2006, p. 20
- 2005 Ribas, Joao, Review, in: Time Out, May 12–18, 2005, p. 74
- 2005 Troncy, Eric, ‘Varadinis, Mirjam (ed): Mark Handforth’, Zürich: JRP Riniger, 2005 (exh. cat.) engl. and German
- 2005 Lunn, Felicity, ‘Mark Handforth, Kunsthaus Zürich’, in: Artforum, No. XLIII, May 2005, p. 242
- 2005 Von Burg, Dominique, ‘Crash im Schein von Neonlicht’, in: Zürichsee-Zeitung. Rechtes Ufer, March 21, 2005, p. 23
- 2005 Bergflödt, Torbjörn, ‘Urbane Landschaft’, in: Südkurier, March 15, 2005, p. 11
- 2005 ‘Kunsthaus Zürich zeigt Plastiken von Mark Handforth’, in: www.dw-world.de, March 11, 2005
- 2005 Basting, Barbara, ‘Trick mit Knick im Kandelaber’ in: Tages Anzeiger, March 2, 2005, p. 50
- 2005 Herzog, Samuel, ‘Im Reich der Luxus-Vandalen: Mark Handforth im Kunsthaus Zürich’, in: Neue Zürcher Zeitung, February 26, 2005, p. 46
- 2005 Frey, Lilith, ‘Es röhrt im Kunsthaus’, in: Blick, February 25, 2005, p. 21

== Personal life ==
Handforth is married to artist Dara Friedman. They live and work in Miami with their two daughters.
