= Daros Collection =

Private modern art collection

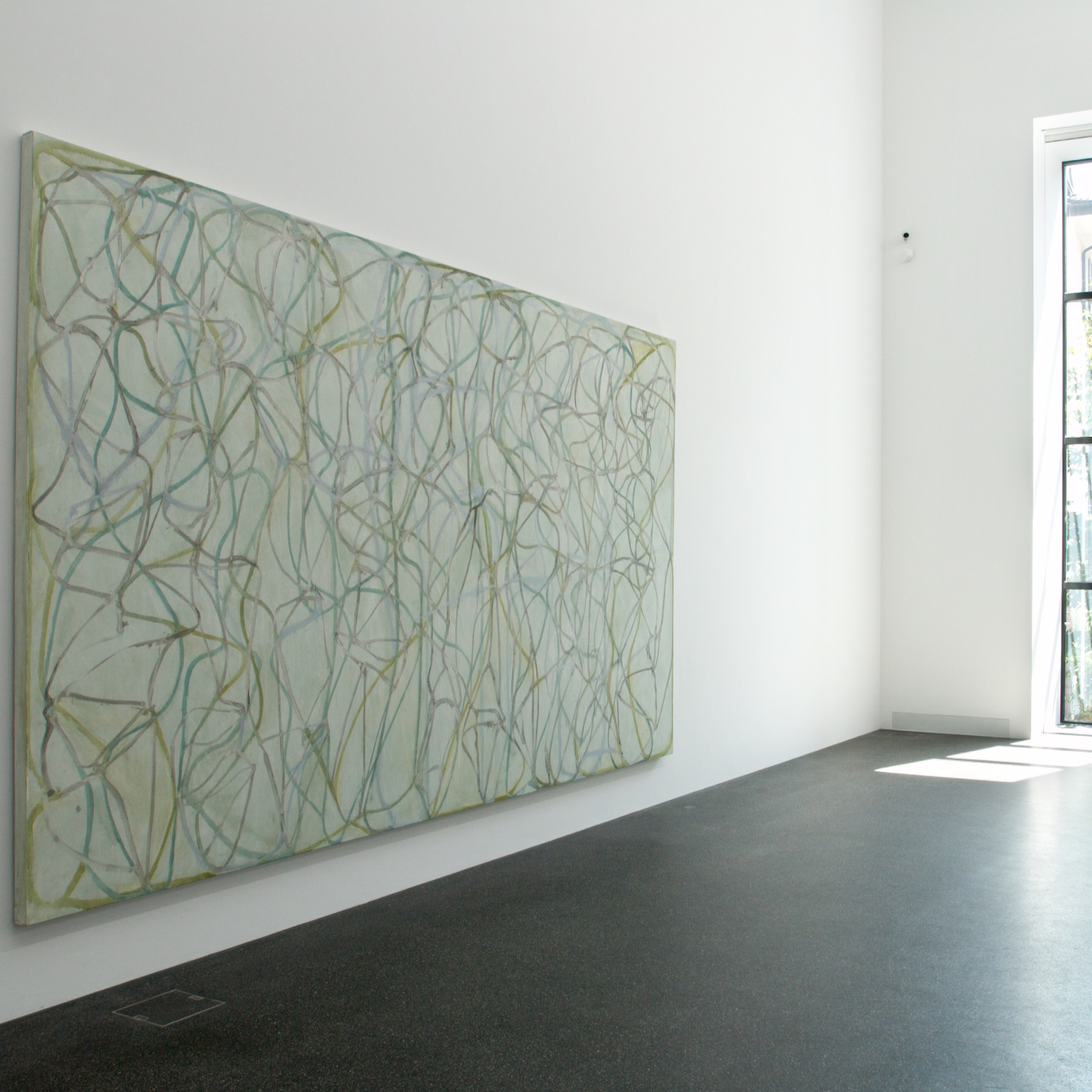
Brice Marden

The Daros Collection is a Swiss private collection of modern art owned by the Stephan Schmidheiny family. At its core are comprehensive groups of work by Andy Warhol, Brice Marden, Cy Twombly, Willem de Kooning and Gerhard Richter.

== Collection ==
The groups of work in the Daros Collection document key movements and positions in the world of art. It comprises around 250 individual items, with the primary focus being on North American and European art from the second half of the 20th century. Besides important exponents of American Abstract Expressionism, Pop Art, Minimal Art and the New York art scene of the 1980s, it also features other precursors and pioneers of current contemporary art.

== Artists currently represented in the collection ==
Jean-Michel Basquiat, Louise Bourgeois, Mark Bradford, Robert Gober, Philipp Guston, Ellsworth Kelly, Willem de Kooning, Brice Marden, Agnes Martin, Bruce Nauman, Barnett Newman, Sigmar Polke, Jackson Pollock, Gerhard Richter, Mark Rothko, Robert Ryman, Thomas Schütte, Richard Serra, Cy Twombly, Andy Warhol, Christopher Wool

== The history of the collection ==
The Daros Collection was established in 1997. Following his brother Alexander Schmidheiny’s death at a young age, Stephan Schmidheiny had inherited his wide-ranging collection of more than 1,000 individual items, which Alexander together with his childhood friend Thomas Ammann had assembled. In addition to outstanding works by Jackson Pollock and Barnett Newman, unique holdings of Andy Warhol and Cy Twombly formed the core of the collection. Stephan Schmidheiny decided to sharpen the collection’s profile and expand it further, entrusting its management to a professional set-up named Daros.

Initially, Daros concentrated on collecting US art from the second half of the 20th century. At the turn of the millennium, the decision was taken to sell off numerous works – including examples by Francesco Clemente, David Reed, Philip Taaffe and Ross Bleckner – and include new artistic positions. Works by artists such as Gerhard Richter, Agnes Martin, Bruce Nauman and Louise Bourgeois were acquired, with the key criterion being their significance in the development of contemporary art.

Over the past decade, Daros has consistently focused the collection on important groups of work by major artists. Further key works by Abstract Expressionists such as Mark Rothko and Willem de Kooning have been acquired, while the existing holdings of Gerhard Richter have been expanded into a significant corpus. Daros has also extended its reach to encompass larger groups by artists such as Christopher Wool and Thomas Schütte, while initial purchases have been made for new collections of important artists such as Philip Guston and Mark Bradford. Daros has also shown its commitment to leading museums in recent years. The Stephan Schmidheiny family / Daros supported the building of the new Tate Modern in London in 2000 and its extension in 2016, as well as the extension project of the Fondation Beyeler in Riehen (Switzerland).

== Ties to the Daros Latinamerica Collection ==
In the 1990s, Stephan Schmidheiny built up an industrial group in Latin America, and at the end of the decade Daros thus also turned its attention to contemporary Latin American art. The Daros Latinamerica Collection was established in 2000 separately from the Daros Collection to allow the two to develop independently of each other. Today it is one of the most comprehensive private collections of contemporary Latin American art.

In December 2025, it was announced that the Daros Latinamerica Collection had been acquired in its entirety by the Museo de Arte Latinoamericano de Buenos Aires (MALBA). The transfer marked the relocation of the collection from Europe to Argentina and its integration into a public museum collection in Latin America.

== Exhibitions ==
=== Cooperation with the Fondation Beyeler ===
Since 2010, the Daros Collection has been working closely with the Fondation Beyeler in Riehen near Basel, which has incorporated groups of work from Daros into its own collection displays. Daros is also supporting the Fondation Beyeler’s planned extension, making a generous donation to lay the cornerstone for this project.

- 2021: Sigmar Polke - Nature Culture
- 2019: Louise Bourgeois - Insomnia Drawings
- 2017: Andy Warhol
- 2016: Christopher Wool
- 2015: Robert Ryman
- 2014: Cy Twombly
- 2013: Mark Rothko
- 2013: Willem de Kooning
- 2011: Barnett Newman
- 2010/2011: Gerhard Richter

=== Selected loans ===
- 2021: Kunsthaus Zürich: Gerhard Richter. A comprehensive landscape exhibition
- 2017/2018: Thomas Ammann Fine Art AG: Cy Twombly
- 2015: Museum of Contemporary Art Basel: Cy Twombly
- 2014/2015: Kunstsammlungen Chemnitz: Andy Warhol ‘Death and Disaster’
- 2011/2012: Tate Modern, London: Gerhard Richter: ‘Panorama’
- 2010: Kunstmuseum Basel: Andy Warhol – The Early Sixties
- 2002: The Museum of Modern Art, New York: Gerhard Richter: 40 Years of Painting
- 2000: Moderna Museet, Stockholm: In the Power of Painting: Warhol, Polke, Richter, Twombly

=== Selected Daros exhibitions (2001–2008) ===
Between 2001 and 2008 Daros staged its own exhibitions, displaying works in temporary presentations at the Daros Exhibitions galleries in Zurich’s Löwenbräu Areal. This space was also used by the Daros Latinamerica Collection.

- 2004: Brice Marden: Drawings and Paintings
- 2002: Cy Twombly: Audible Silence
- 2000: In the Power of Painting: Warhol, Polke, Richter, Twombly

=== External links ===
- Website of the Daros Collection
- Daros Collection on Instagram
- Website of Stephan Schmidheiny
- Website of the Daros Latinamerica Collection

=== Bibliography ===
- Walter Soppelsa (ed.): Daros at Beyeler. Works from the Daros Collection at the Fondation Beyeler 2010 - 2017. Zurich 2017, ISBN 978-3-033-06309-9
- Walter Soppelsa (ed.): Selection from the Daros Collection. Zurich 2012, ISBN 978-3-033-03444-0
- Daros Services AG and Daros Latinamerica AG (ed.): Face to Face: The Daros Collections. Hatje Cantz, Berlin 2008, ISBN 978-3-7757-2112-7
- Daros Services AG (ed.): Louise Bourgeois: Emotions Abstracted. Hatje Cantz, Berlin 2004, ISBN 3-7757-1461-8
- Peter Fischer (ed.): Louise Bourgeois: The Insomnia Drawings. Scalo, Zurich 2000, ISBN 3-908247-39X
- Daros Services AG (ed.) Brice Marden: Drawings and Paintings 1964-2002. Scalo, Zurich 2002, ISBN 3-908247-70-5
- Daros Services AG (ed.) Audible Silence: Cy Twombly at Daros. Scalo, Zurich 2002, ISBN 3-908247-65-9
- Daros Services AG (ed.) Nauman Kruger Jaar. Scalo, Zurich 2001. ISBN 3-908247-60-8
- Alesco (ed.): Warhol Polke Richter: In the Power of Painting 1. Scalo, Zurich 2001, ISBN 3-908247-52-7
- Peter Fischer (ed.): In the power of painting. Scalo, Zurich 2000, ISBN 978-3-908247-27-2
- Peter Fischer (ed.): Abstraction, gesture, ecriture: paintings from the Daros Collection. Scalo, Zurich 1999, ISBN 978-3-908247-99-9
