= Deborah Jack =

Caribbean visual artist and poet (born 1970)

- Born: Deborah Drisana Jack; 1970 (age 55–56); Rotterdam, Netherlands
- Education: State University of New York at Buffalo (MFA, 2006)
- Occupations: Visual artist and poet
- Website: deborahjack.com

Deborah Drisana Jack (born 1970) is a Caribbean visual artist and poet. Raised on the island of Saint Martin, her art is both conceptual and interdisciplinary, employing installation, photography, and film to explore various themes. She has published two poetry collections. Jack graduated from the State University of New York at Buffalo and teaches art at New Jersey City University.

== Early life and education ==
Jack was born in 1970 in Rotterdam, Netherlands. She grew up in Sint Maarten, the Dutch half of the island of Saint Martin in the Caribbean.

In the 1990s, Jack worked in an art gallery and was among the founding partners of the Philipsburg-based AXUM. She earned her MFA in 2002 from the State University of New York at Buffalo.

== Art career ==
Jack's art is conceptual, exploring themes related to the African diaspora, memory and time. Her works are multidisciplinary, using installation, photography, and film. She frequently uses motifs such as the ocean, salt, slavery, the Middle Passage, and Atlantic hurricanes.

"To watch me film would be a performance. I am a very low-tech, low-fi creator, even with the digital tools. I would have the camera strapped to my hand and would choreograph a way to move through the trees so that you would think that you are going through some kind of experience. There is this dance performance that is happening to get a certain smoothness for me to know that if I am going to slow it down then I need to move at a certain speed." —Deborah Jack for BOMB Magazine, 24 February 2021.

Salt plays a crucial role in much of Jack's work. Historically, salt mining in Saint Martin was accomplished through slave labour. Beginning in the early 2000s, Jack's art has incorporated salt as a motif, connecting members of the African diaspora through the ocean to their roots in Africa. For her 2002 Foremothers series, she used rock salt in portraits of her paternal grandmother.

Jack had a summer residency at Big Orbit Gallery in 2004 and her installation SHORE debuted there on 11 September. She layered the gallery floors with five tons of brown and white salt which visitors trod on. The installation employed a 40-foot by 20-foot reflecting pool at the edge of the floor and used projected video, sound, and nylon sails to evoke themes related to memory, the history of Saint Martin, slavery, and the Middle Passage.

After a purchaser of one of the paintings from Jack's A/Salting Series informed her the artwork had been growing, she visited the painting to discover that it had been recently moved and a change in air moisture had caused new crystallization of the salts.

Jack is considered an important poet from the Caribbean island of St. Martin, where her nom de plume is Drisana. The debut poetry collection, The Rainy Season by Drisana Deborah Jack, was published by House of Nehesi Publishers (HNP) in 1997. Her second book of verse, skin (2006), was also published by the Saint Martin (island) indie press.

A 20-year retrospective of Jack's work, Deborah Jack: 20 Years, was held at Pen + Brush in 2021. Jack gave the keynote address at the 2021 St. Martin Book Fair. She also received the Presidents Award at the book fair.

Jack holds an assistant professorship at New Jersey City University, where she teaches art.

Deborah Jack's film fecund memories of sky and salt...the amnesia of a history unrehearsed, still lush... (2022) was acquired by the Pérez Art Museum Miami, Florida, and exhibited in The Days That Build Us (2024), a show organized by PAMMTV, a video art streaming platform, at PAMM.

== Selected exhibitions ==
- 2010 somewhere in the tangle of limbs and roots, California Institute of Integral Studies, San Francisco, California
- 2019 The Other Side of Now: Foresight in Contemporary Caribbean Art, Pérez Art Museum Miami, Florida
- 2021 Deborah Jack: 20 Years, Penn and Brush, New York
- 2022 Forecast Form: Art in the Caribbean Diaspora, 1990’s-Today, Museum of Contemporary Art, Chicago, Illinois
- 2023 Forecast Form: Art in the Caribbean Diaspora, 1990’s-Today, Institute of Contemporary Art, Boston, Massachusetts
- 2024 Forecast Form: Art in the Caribbean Diaspora, 1990’s-Today, Museum of Contemporary Art, San Diego, California
- 2024 The Days That Build Us, PAMMTV, Pérez Art Museum Miami, Florida

== Public collections (selected) ==
- Pérez Art Museum Miami, Florida
- Smith College Museum of Art, Massachusetts
- Museum of Contemporary Art Chicago, Illinois

== Works ==
=== Poetry collections ===
- 1997: The Rainy Season, House of Nehesi Publishers (St. Martin)
- 2006: skin, House of Nehesi Publishers (St. Martin)

=== Other books ===
(In which Deborah Jack is profiled and her poetry and/or art critiqued)

- 2000: St. Martin Massive! A Snapshot of Popular Artists, House of Nehesi Publishers (St. Martin)
- 2003: Salted Tongues: Modern Literature in St.Martin, House of Nehesi Publishers (St. Martin)
- 2006: Haunting Capital: Memory, Text and the Black Diasporic Body, University Press of New England (USA)
- 2022: Deborah Jack: 20 Years, Pen + Brush (New York)
