= Leventon =

Leventon is a surname. Notable people with the surname include:

- Annabel Leventon (born 1942), English actress
- Edwin Leventon (1845–1909), English cricketer
- Rosie Leventon, British visual artist
