= Li Yuen Chia =

Chinese artist, poet and curator (1929–1994)

Li Yuen Chia (Chinese: 李元佳; pinyin: Lǐ Yuánjiā, 1929–1994) was a Chinese artist, poet and curator. He incorporated installations, works and photography into his art, and was one of a small number of artists of Chinese background active in the UK during his lifetime.

== Early life and Taiwan ==
Li Yuen Chia was born in Guangxi, China. He was educated in Taiwan from 1949.

Li Yuen Chia was one of the Ton Fan group (東方畫會) that formed in Taiwan by 1956, also known as Orient Movement or Dongfang Huahui. It is credited with establishing modern abstract art in Chinese circles. Li was one of a number of students of Li Chung-sheng (李仲生, Pinyin Li Zhongsheng) in Ton Fan, who collectively became known as the "Eight Great Outlaws" (八大響馬).

Name (Pinyin)	Name (otherwise romanised)	Traditional characters	Comments
Chen Daoming	Chen Tao Ming	陳道明	Otherwise Tommy Chen
Huo Gang	Ho Kan	霍剛	
	Hsia Yan	夏陽	Real name Hsia Tsu-hsiang (Xia Zuxiang in pinyin)
Xiao Mingxian	Hsiao Ming-Hsien	蕭明賢	Real name Xiao Long
Xiao Qin	Hsiao Chin	萧勤	
Li Yuanjia	Li Yuan-Chia	李元佳	
	Ouyang Wen-Yuan	歐陽文苑	
	Wu Hao	吳昊	Real name Wu Shilu

The group exhibited in 1957 at the São Paulo Art Biennial. In Taipei in November 1957 they held a collective exhibition, including works by Spanish painters obtained by Hsiao Chin. This was the first of 15 shows to 1971, but the group became less active because of the emigration of many of its members. A 25th anniversary show took place in 1981.

Li Chung-sheng later commented on Li Yuen Chia's initial development by a facile calligraphic style, but also as an early Chinese conceptual artist.

== In Italy and London ==
Li spent time in Italy, in Bologna and Milan; he was a founder of the Punto group, rejoining Hsiao Chin (蕭勤, Pinyin Xiao Qin), and was resident in Bologna in 1965.

Li Yuen Chia moved to London in 1965 where he exhibited with David Medalla and later at the Lisson Gallery. He participated in the 1966 Signals 3 + 1 exhibition, organised by Paul Keeler and Anthony de Kedrel, with Hsiao Chin, Ho Kan, and Pia Pizzo.

== In the North of England ==
In 1968 Li Yuen Chia moved to the area of Brampton (now in Cumbria) in North West England. After two years residence near Lanercost, he purchased a derelict farmhouse at Banks on Hadrian's Wall from the artist Winifred Nicholson. By his own efforts and with scant resources he converted the farmhouse into the LYC Museum and Art Gallery and opened it in 1972. A local artist friend was Audrey Barker. The Museum was described by Hunter Davies in his book A Walk along the Wall, who noted among its exhibits a piece by Takis and a painting by Alfred Wallis.

The LYC exhibited artists such as Andy Goldsworthy and David Nash. Rosie Leventon, Rose Frain, Kate Nicholson and Bill Woodrow held solo shows there during the 1980s. It also encouraged the creative efforts of children, some of whom went on to successful careers in the arts. The musician Delia Derbyshire worked there as Li's assistant.

Gaining increasing recognition for his enterprise, after a year or two Li was awarded funding from the Arts Council, making it possible for the Museum to continue its activities for the ten years he had originally planned.

== Death and legacy ==
Li Yuen Chia died of cancer in 1994.

There was a 1998 memorial exhibition of his work in Taipei. A retrospective of his work and career was shown in London at the Camden Arts Centre in 2001. An exhibition "Making New Worlds: Li Yuen Chia & Friends" at Kettle's Yard in Cambridge ends in February 2024.

== Exhibitions ==
- São Paulo Biennale 1957
- São Paulo Biennale 1959
- Stadisches Museum Leverkusen 1960
- Obelisko Gallery Rome
- White - White 1965
- Signals London Soundings Two 1966
- Signals London Soundings 3 + 1 = Li Y - C etc.
- Lisson Gallery
- Cosmic Point 1967
- The Other Story, Hayward Gallery, 1989–90
- Camden Arts Centre, 26 January - 18 March 2001; Kendal, Cumbria: Abbot Hall Art Gallery, Kendal 28 March - 3 June; Palais des Beaux-Arts, Brussels 6 July - 9 September 2001

== See also ==
- British art
- Chinese art
- Taiwanese art
