= A Matter of Time =

A Matter of Time or Matter of Time may refer to:

== Books ==
- A Matter of Time: an Archaeological Survey of the River Gravels of England, a 1960 monograph by Collin Bowen
- A Matter of Time, novel by Jessamyn West 1966
- A Matter of Time (Cook novel), a 1985 sci-fi novel by Glen Cook
- A Matter of Time (Deshpande novel), a 1996 novel by Shashi Deshpande

== Film and TV ==
- A Matter of Time (1976 film), a film starring Ingrid Bergman and Liza Minnelli
- A Matter of Time (upcoming film), an upcoming American fantasy drama film
- A Matter of Time, a 2016 documentary film about Kathryn Calder directed by Casey Cohen
- "A Matter of Time" (Stargate SG-1), an episode of the second season of Stargate SG-1
- "A Matter of Time" (Star Trek: The Next Generation), a 1991 episode of the fifth season of Star Trek: The Next Generation

== Music ==
=== Albums ===
- A Matter of Time (Hilltop Hoods album), 1999
- A Matter of Time (Jason Sellers album), 1999, or its title track
- A Matter of Time (Shed Seven album), 2024
- A Matter of Time (Laufey album), 2025
- A Matter of Time (mixtape), a 2009 mixtape by Mike Posner
- Matter of Time (Axium album), a 2002 album by Axium, or the title song
- Matter of Time (Meg Mac album), a 2022 album by Meg Mac

=== Songs ===
- "A Matter of Time" (Bec Cartwright song), 2003
- "A Matter of Time" (Sennek song), 2018 song that represented Belgium in the Eurovision Song Contest 2018
- "A Matter of Time", a single by Berlin from their 1980 debut album Information
- "A Matter of Time", a song by Spandau Ballet from the album Heart Like a Sky
- "A Matter of Time", a song by The Killers from the album Battle Born
- "A Matter of Time", a song by The Foo Fighters from the album Wasting Light
- "A Matter of Time", a song by Jukebox the Ghost from the album Let Live & Let Ghosts
- "Matter of Time", a song by Dream Street from their self titled album
- "Matter of Time", a song by Hellyeah from the album Hellyeah
- "Matter of Time", a song by Vanessa Carlton from Liberman
- "Matter of Time (interlude)" a song by Ashton Irwin from Superbloom

== See also ==
- It's Just a Matter of Time (disambiguation)
- Just a Matter of Time (disambiguation)
- The Matter of Time, an installation by the American sculptor Richard Serra
