= Hsia Yang =

Chinese artist

Hsia Yang (Chinese: 夏陽, born 1932), born as Hsia Tsu-hsiang (夏祖湘), is a contemporary Taiwanese visual artist from Xiangxiang, Hunan. Renowned for his proficiency in "photorealism" painting, he is also known for the distinctive "Fuzzy People Series" (毛毛人系列) characterized by abstract expressionism.

== Life ==
=== Early life ===
Born in 1932 into a scholarly family in Xiangxiang, Hunan, Hsia Yang faced the loss of both parents during his early childhood and was raised by his grandmother. After the Second Sino-Japanese War, he attended various institutions, including the private Zhongying Middle School (私立鐘英中學) in Nanjing, the Wesleyan Church school (教會學校衛斯理堂), and the Nanjing Municipal Teachers College's abbreviated teaching program (南京市立師範學校簡師科). During his academic years, Hsia Yang discovered his passion for painting portraits, a preference that would significantly influence his later works, which predominantly depict human figures. After graduating from the Nanjing Municipal Teachers College (南京市立師範學校), he enlisted in the military to secure a stable livelihood. In 1949, following the retreat of the Nationalist government to Taiwan, he was assigned to institutions such as the Military Academy in Kaohsiung and the Air Force Headquarters in Taipei, serving until his discharge in 1959.

=== Li Zhongsheng Studio and the Establishment of the Eastern Painting Society ===
Upon his arrival in Taiwan, driven by his interest in painting, Hsia Yang, along with his military comrade Wu Hao (吳昊, 1932–2019), attended an art training class founded by Liu Shi (劉獅) and Huang Rongcan (黃榮燦) in 1950. During visits to modern art exhibitions, he came into contact with the works of Li Zhongsheng (李仲生), Chu Teh-Chun (朱德群), and others. In 1951, Hsia Yang and Wu Hao joined Li Zhongsheng's studio on Andong Street (安東街) to study painting. Li Zhongsheng introduced various artistic styles and philosophies, encouraging students to discover a painting style that suited their personalities.

In the 1950s, with the assistance of his military comrade Shang Yongmao (尚永茂), Hsia Yang, along with Wu Hao and Ouyang Wenyuan (歐陽文苑), created artworks in an air-raid shelter on LongChiang Street (龍江街). This activity allowed them to interact with figures in the art scene, leading to the acquaintance of individuals such as Chang Yi-hsiung (張義雄), Xiao Qin (蕭勤), Yang Yuyu (楊英風), Shiy De-jinn (席德進), and Huo Gang (霍剛).

In 1956, Hsia Yang, along with his studio classmates Ouyang Wenyuan, Huo Gang, Xiao Qin, Li Yuanjia (李元佳), Chen Daoming (陳道明), Wu Hao, and Xiao Mingxian (蕭明賢), established the Ton Fan group (東方畫會). The society was officially approved in 1957, and writer He Fan (何凡) humorously referred to these eight founding members as the "Eight Bandits," (八大響馬) praising their role in breaking traditional painting norms and pioneering the trend of modern painting. During this period, Hsia Yang was influenced by abstract expressionism and monochromatism. His artistic style shifted from "Neoclassicism" to "Abstract Expressionism," with works such as "Painting 59" (1959) and "Painting 6136-AZ" (1961).

=== Overseas Period ===
In 1963, seeking to broaden his international perspective, Hsia Yang traveled to Europe. He first visited Milan to meet with Xiao Qin and later settled in Paris for five years. During his time in Paris, Hsia Yang took on various jobs, explored museums, went to exhibitions, and continued to create art despite the challenging circumstances. It was during this period that he developed the "Furry People" (Mao Mao Ren, 毛毛人) series. Cai Wenting (蔡文婷) mentioned in the book "For Art, Wandering Through Life: Hsia Yang and His ' Furry People '" that the " Furry People " figures are depicted with trembling and chaotic lines, suggesting a sense of alienation in modern life and reflecting Hsia Yang's loneliness as a foreigner. The themes of the Furry People series in Paris were often inspired by Hsia Yang's life experience and observation, as seen in works like "Indoor" (室內, 1966) depicting indifferent interpersonal relationships, and the fantastical cityscape in "Beauty Pageant" (選美, 1968).In 1965, due to the success of the Furry People series, Hsia Yang held a solo exhibition at the Galerie du Haut Pave in Paris.

In 1968, Hsia Yang received a letter from his artist friend Zhang Hong (張弘), stating that life in New York was more manageable. This prompted him to relocate to New York.During this period, Photorealism was gaining popularity in New York, and Hsia Yang began experimenting with his own approach, using an eighth-second shutter speed to capture scenes and people on the streets. The blurred figures in the photographs echoed the fuzzy nature of the Furry People series. In 1972, Hsia Yang completed his first Photorealistic work, "Katie," garnering attention in the art scene. In 1973, he became the exclusive artist represented by the O.K. Harris Gallery in New York. Subsequently, Hsia Yang's artworks gradually shifted to depicting colorful street scenes, portraying bustling pedestrians on lively streets. Until the late 1980s, Hsia Yang created his only interior Photorealistic work, featuring Ivan Karp, the owner of the O.K. Harris Gallery, marking the conclusion of his Photorealistic period.

=== Settling in Taipei ===
In the late 1980s, Hsia Yang received invitations from public art museums and private galleries in Taiwan, prompting him to return from New York to hold exhibitions. In 1992, he made the decision to permanently return and settle in Taiwan. During this period, he revisited and made breakthroughs in the Furry People series. Departing from contemporary societal figures, Hsia Yang began depicting characters from traditional myths and folk stories, such as Guan Yu (關羽), Door Gods, Ji Gong (濟公), and Nezha (太子爺). Chen Wen-fen (陳文芬) mentioned in the book "Hsia Yang," stating, "The forms of these figures are elusive, but their attire and accessories are realistically portrayed, conveying a solemn and dignified atmosphere, symbolizing Hsia Yang's respect for traditional Taoist culture."

In addition to themes from Chinese traditional culture, starting in 1993, Hsia Yang began imitating Western masterpieces, presenting figures in the form of Furry People, such as those in Jean-François Millet's "The Gleaners" (1998) and Leonardo da Vinci's "The Last Supper" (1998). From 1999 onwards, Hsia Yang's works transitioned from flat paintings to three-dimensional sculptures. Using electric shears and copper sheets, he transformed the Furry People series into three-dimensional metal sculptures. Representative works include "Man with Raised Hands" (舉雙手的人, 1999) and "Qi Jia Jun" (戚家君, 2000). In 2000, Hsia Yang was awarded for the Fourth National Award for Arts, receiving the honor of a Lifetime Achievement Award in the field of arts.

=== Relocating to Shanghai ===
In 2002, Hsia Yang relocated to Shanghai, where he set up a studio with adjustable easels, enabling him to create large-scale artworks. In terms of creative themes, Hsia Yang merged traditional literati painting with scenes from modern life. Additionally, he incorporated papercutting and collage techniques into his paintings. Representative works from this period include "Imitating Fan Kuan's Traveling in the Mountains along Streams" (仿范寬谿山行旅圖, 2006) and "Landscape Five" (山水五, 2018).

=== Art Market ===
Hsia Yang's photorealistic works have been particularly well received in the art market. "Walking Man #1" (行走的人#1) was sold for 575,000 NTD at the 2003 Ching Shing Lou Autumn Auction. "City Bird" (都市之鳥) achieved a transaction of 1,770,000 NTD at the 2010 Ching Shing Lou Spring Auction, while "Edison Electric – New York" (愛迪生電工–紐約) reached a high price of 1,920,000 NTD at the 2019 Taipei Spring Auction hosted by Lofty. Additionally, Hsia Yang's "Mao Mao Ren" series has also performed well in the market. For instance, "Five Elements Eight Trigrams" (五行八卦) sold for 236,000 NTD at the 2008 Golden Times Taipei Spring Auction, and "Living Room," (客廳) created during his time in Paris, fetched 495,600 HKD at the 2019 Christie's Spring Auction.
