= It's Just a Matter of Time =

It's Just a Matter of Time may refer to:

- It's Just a Matter of Time (album), a 1985 album by Glen Campbell
- "It's Just a Matter of Time" (song), a song by Brook Benton, also covered by Sonny James, Glen Campbell and Randy Travis
- "It's Just a Matter of Time", a song by The Beach Boys from The Beach Boys
- "It's Just a Matter of Time", a song by Liza Minnelli from Liza! Liza!
- "It's Just a Matter of Time", a song by Peabo Bryson from Peabo
- "It's Just a Matter of Time", a song from the musical Ace

== See also ==
- Just a Matter of Time (disambiguation)
- A Matter of Time (disambiguation)
