= Just a Matter of Time =

Just a Matter of Time may refer to:

- Just a Matter of Time (novel), a 1973 novel by James Hadley Chase
- Just a Matter of Time (Marlena Shaw album), 1976
- Just a Matter of Time (Randy Rogers Band album), 2006

== See also ==
- It's Just a Matter of Time (disambiguation)
- A Matter of Time (disambiguation)
