= Puppy (sculpture) =

Sculpture by Jeff Koons

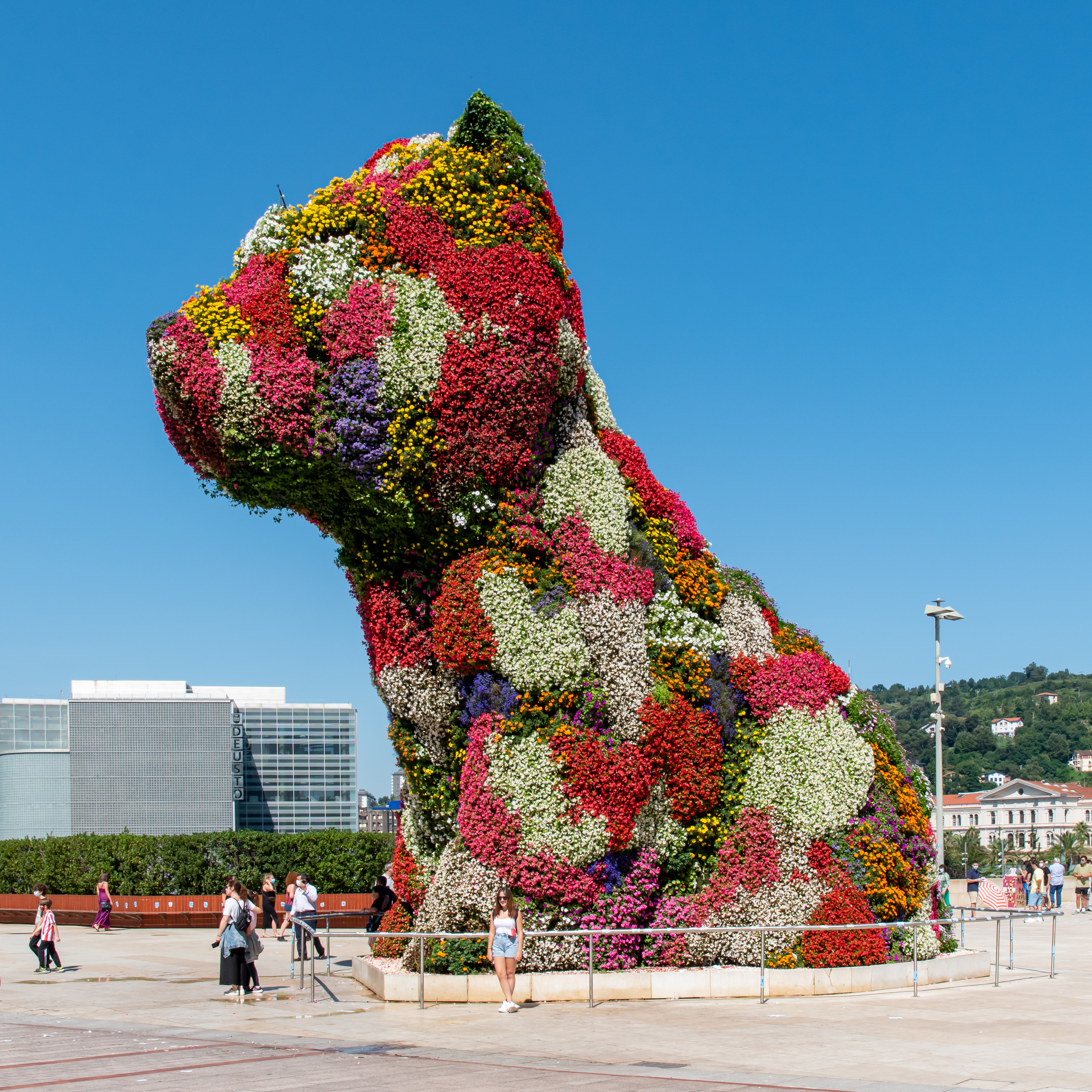
- Artist: Jeff Koons
- Year: 1992
- Medium: Stainless steel, soil, flowering plants
- Subject: West Highland White Terrier
- Dimensions: 12.4 m × 12.4 m × 8.2 m (41 ft × 41 ft × 27 ft)
- Location: Guggenheim Museum Bilbao, Bilbao, Spain; 43.2677°N 2.9345°W
- Website: Puppy

Puppy is a floral sculpture by American artist Jeff Koons. Since 1997, it has been on display outside the Guggenheim Museum in Bilbao, Spain. The 12.4-metre (41 ft) sculpture depicts a West Highland White Terrier. It is decorated with 38,000 plants, which are replaced twice a year and watered by internal irrigation.

Koons exhibited the first version of Puppy outside Arolsen Castle in Germany in 1992. The present version was exhibited outside the Museum of Contemporary Art Australia for three months from December 1995, and has been in place in Bilbao since the Guggenheim's opening in October 1997. For three months in 2000, it was exhibited outside the Rockefeller Center in New York City.

== Description ==
Puppy is a floral sculpture of a West Highland White Terrier. It is 12.4 metres (41 ft), and is decorated with 38,000 plants, typically begonias, impatiens, marigolds, and petunias, which are replaced twice a year. The sculpture contains 23 tons of soil and uses an internal irrigation system to water the plants.

Koons said in 2021 that "Puppy was inspired by my visits to Europe's baroque cathedrals and the way they achieve this balance between the symmetrical and the asymmetrical and between the eternal and the ephemeral". The Guggenheim Museum website describes the sculpture as being influenced by 18th-century European gardens, as well as combining the elite pastimes of topiary and dog breeding with the mass-market appeal of Chia Pets and Hallmark Cards.

== History ==
In 1992, after Koons was not chosen to exhibit his works at Documenta 9 in Kassel, Germany, he constructed the original Puppy, which went on display 40 minutes' drive away at Bad Arolsen. The original version used 17,000 flowers of 27 varieties. Referring to its position in front of the baroque Arolsen Castle, Roberta Smith of The New York Times wrote "Palace and puppy seem made for each other, so perfectly matched in scale that the building is transformed into an ornate sculptural frame – or a lavish doghouse." After the success in Germany, Koons made a new permanent version with a steel frame, one meter taller, that was exhibited outside the Museum of Contemporary Art Australia in Sydney from December 1995 to March 1996.

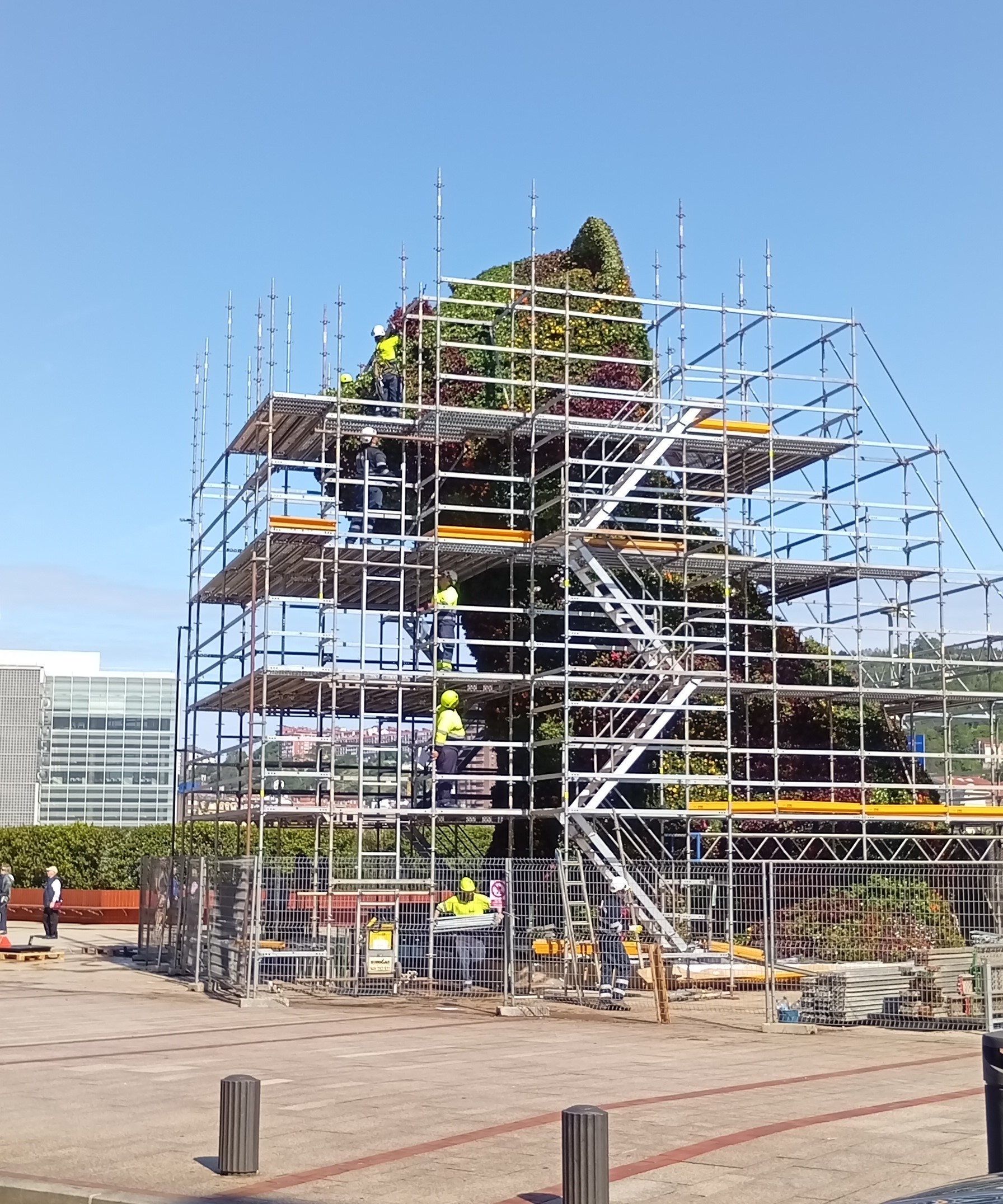
Puppy having its flowers replaced in May 2025. The renovation is performed twice a year.

Puppy was purchased by the Solomon R. Guggenheim Foundation and transported to Spain in September 1997 for the opening of the Guggenheim Museum Bilbao. On October 13, 1997, five days before inauguration of the museum, armed separatist group ETA parked a van next to the sculpture, claiming to be delivering plants. After the regional police Ertzaintza checked the vehicle's registration and found it to be fraudulent, policeman José María Aguirre was fatally shot. Explosives were found in the plant pots.

From June to September 2000, the sculpture was displayed outside the Rockefeller Center in New York City. Art critic Jerry Saltz wrote of its New York exhibition "Like an early Beatles song, Puppy just made people happy. Even contemporary-art haters responded to it with grudging warmth. Unlike most public art, it reached out to viewers, and they responded."

In December 2020, during the COVID-19 pandemic in Spain, Puppy was decorated with a face mask of blue and white flowers. The addition was suggested by a local doctor as a way to set an example, and had to be authorized by Koons. After over 20 years on display, in July 2021, the museum asked for €100,000 in donations to repair Puppy. The sculpture required replacement of its irrigation system and some of the steel frame. Local rapper Gransan released a song "P.U.P.P.Y." to raise funds. For the 25th anniversary of the museum in 2022, Puppy received a new design predominantly with white flowers.
