= Arnold Chang =

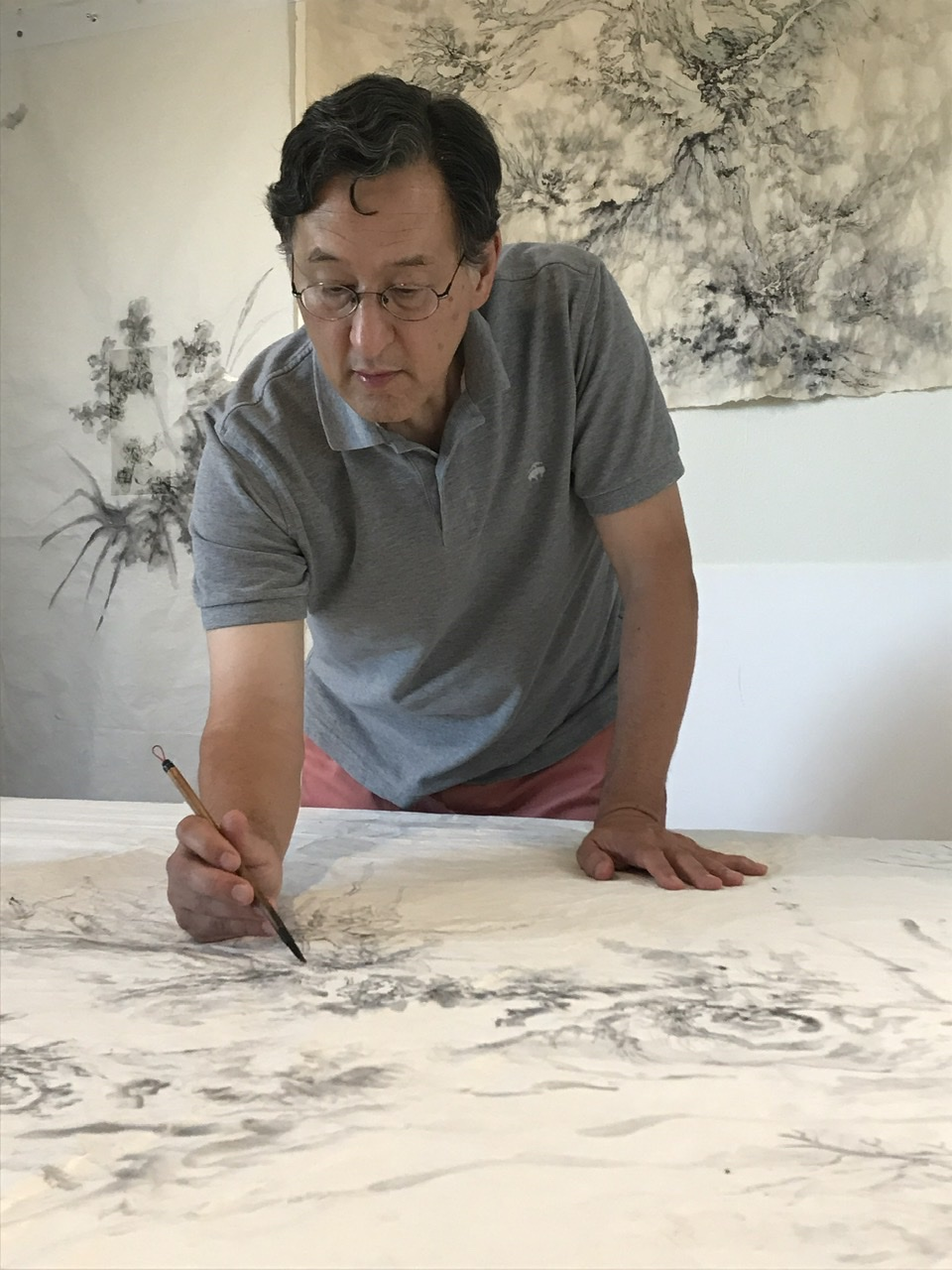
Arnold Chang at work, 2017.

Arnold Chang (Chinese: 張洪 Zhang Hong, studio name 巨川 Juchuan) (born 1954) is a Chinese American artist, curator, and art historian. He specializes in Chinese literati-style landscape paintings. He was the founder of the Chinese painting department at Sotheby's.

== Background and early career ==
Chang was born in New York City. The youngest of three brothers, Chang says he knew he wanted to become a painter from the age of nine when he first saw paintings by the great twentieth-century Chinese painter Zhang Daqian. His father arranged for him to begin painting and calligraphy lessons with a local painter from Shanghai, Wang Jiyuan (王濟遠). Chang was particularly fascinated by Chinese calligraphy and began to study Chinese language. Majoring in East Asian Studies and Chinese language in college, Chang was able to spend time in Taiwan, where he studied traditional landscape painting under Guo Yanqiao (Kuo Yen-ch'iao 郭燕橋).

After college, Chang went on to graduate school at the University of California, Berkeley, where he studied under art historian James Cahill. It was through Cahill that Chang met the eminent Chinese painter and art collector C.C. Wang (王己千). Chang followed Wang to New York, where he studied both painting and connoisseurship. In New York, Chang was hired by Sotheby's to help with a Chinese art auction, and afterward was immediately hired to head a brand new Chinese painting department at the auction house. Chang worked at Sotheby's from 1978 to 1993, at the same time continuing to paint and study under C.C. Wang. After leaving Sotheby's, Chang worked as Chinese painting specialist at Kaikodo in New York City from 1996 to 2006. This new job allowed him more time in the studio to focus on his own art.

== Paintings ==
Arnold Chang paints in the traditional literati style of ink landscapes and his paintings are known for the commitment to Chinese art conventions, with special attention to brushwork. Chang identifies with the literati way of life, with its focus on self-expression and painting as a means of self-cultivation.

When asked what he hopes to achieve in his art, Chang explained:

The challenge I've set for myself is to create landscapes in classical mode, using techniques and materials that would have been available to Chinese painters as early as the tenth century. I don't include specific references to time, such as figures, and only include generic houses, purposely wanting to make them non-specific in time. The response I seek from the viewer is that the work has the look and feel of an old master painting. And yet, one can't point to any specific image or artist that I am copying. In other words, my paintings are based on traditional brushwork, structure, composition, techniques I've learned through years and years of studying old paintings, but I'm now taking all of that experience and melding it into my personal vision of landscape.

— Arnold Chang, "Embracing Tradition Ink Landscapes", 2006.

Bridge to Heaven (2006) is probably his best-known painting.

== Selected exhibitions ==
- Guggenheim Museum Bilbao, A Century in Crisis: Modernity and Tradition in the Art of Twentieth-Century China, February – May 1998.
- Princeton University Art Museum, Princeton, Outside-In, March – June 2009.
- Museum of Fine Arts, Boston, Fresh Ink: Ten Takes on Chinese Tradition, November 2010 to February 2011.
- Asian Art Museum, San Francisco, From 2 Arises 3: The Collaborative Works of Arnold Chang and Michael Cherney, 2009–2014, July 2014 – March 2015.
- Cleveland Museum of Art, Cleveland, Chinese Landscape Duets of Arnold Chang and Michael Cherney, July 15, 2015 – February 7, 2016.
- Metropolitan Museum of Art, New York, Streams and Mountains with our End: Landscape Traditions of China, Aug 26, 2017 – Aug 4, 2019.
