= Guggenheim Museum Bilbao =

Modern and contemporary art museum in Bilbao, Spain

- Museo Guggenheim Bilbao; Guggenheim Bilbao Museoa

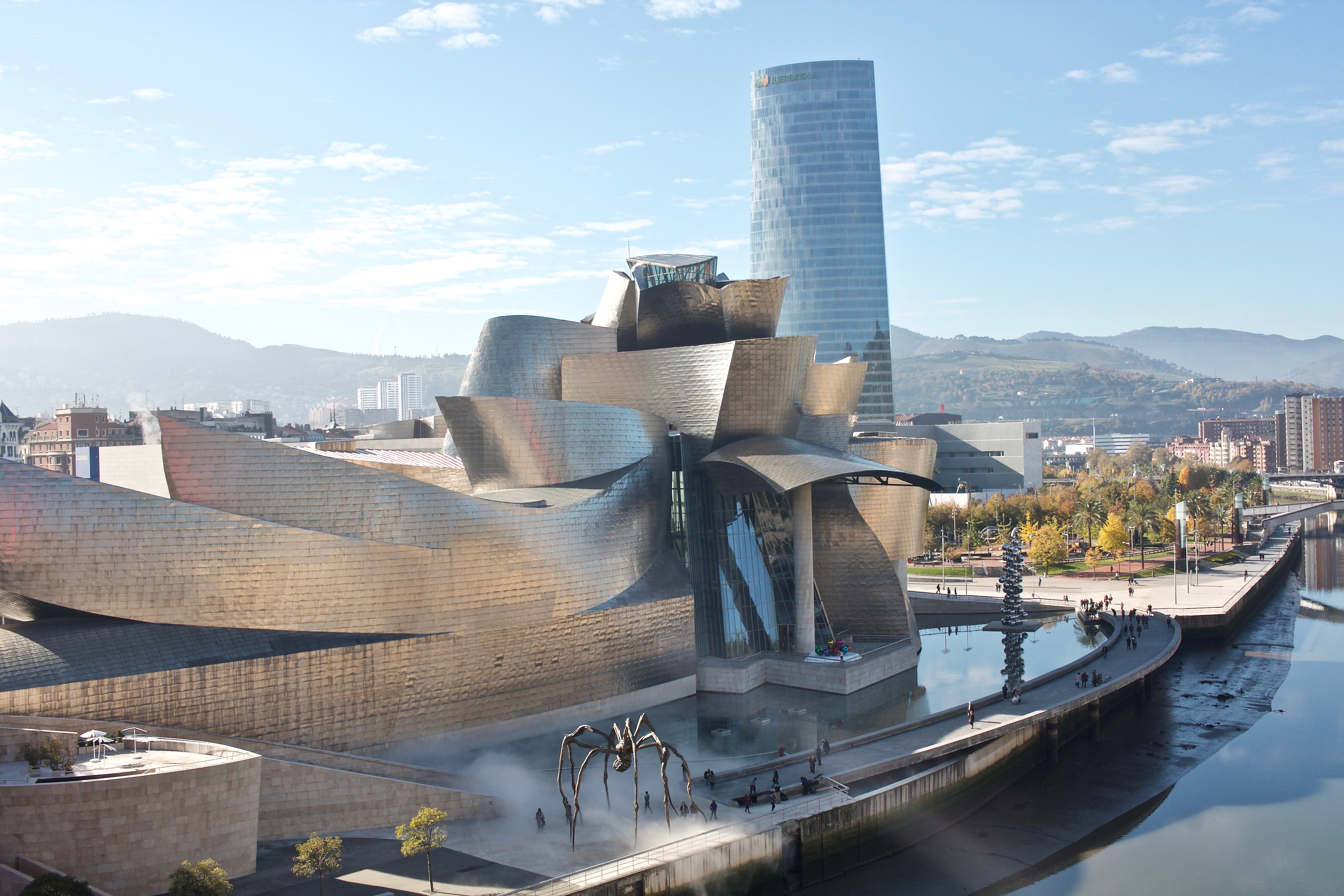
- The Guggenheim Museum Bilbao, along the Nervión Estuary in central Bilbao
- Established: 18 October 1997; 29 years ago
- Location: Abando, Bilbao, Spain
- Coordinates: 43°16′07″N 2°56′02″W
- Type: Art museum
- Visitors: 1,305,003 (2025)
- Director: Miren Arzalluz
- Architect: Frank Gehry
- Public transit access: Guggenheim
- Website: www.guggenheim-bilbao.eus

The Guggenheim Museum Bilbao is a museum of modern and contemporary art in Bilbao, Biscay, Spain. It is one of several museums affiliated to the Solomon R. Guggenheim Foundation and features permanent and visiting exhibits of works by Spanish and international artists. It was inaugurated on 18 October 1997 by King Juan Carlos I of Spain, with an exhibition of 250 contemporary works of art. It is one of the largest museums in Spain.

The building, designed by Canadian-American architect Frank Gehry, was built alongside the Nervion River, which runs through the city to the Cantabrian Sea. A work of contemporary architecture, it has been hailed as a "signal moment in the architectural culture", because it represents "one of those rare moments when critics, academics, and the general public were all completely united about something", according to architectural critic Paul Goldberger. The museum was the building most frequently named as one of the most important works completed since 1980 in the 2010 World Architecture Survey among architecture experts. It changed the city quarter.

== History ==
=== Founding ===
In 1991, the Basque Government suggested to the Solomon R. Guggenheim Foundation that it would fund a Guggenheim museum to be built in Bilbao's decrepit port area, once the city's main source of income. The Basque government agreed to cover the US$100 million construction cost, to create a $50 million acquisitions fund, to pay a one-time $20 million fee to the Guggenheim and to subsidize the museum's $12 million annual budget. In exchange, the foundation agreed to manage the institution, rotate parts of its permanent collection through the Bilbao museum and organize temporary exhibitions.

The museum was built by Ferrovial, at a cost of $89 million. About 5,000 residents of Bilbao attended a preopening extravaganza outside the museum on the night preceding the official opening, featuring an outdoor light show and concerts. On 18 October 1997 the museum was opened by Juan Carlos I of Spain. On 13 October, two ETA militants shot dead a Basque policeman who interrupted their attempt to set up grenade launchers to attack the opening.

=== Urdaibai expansion ===
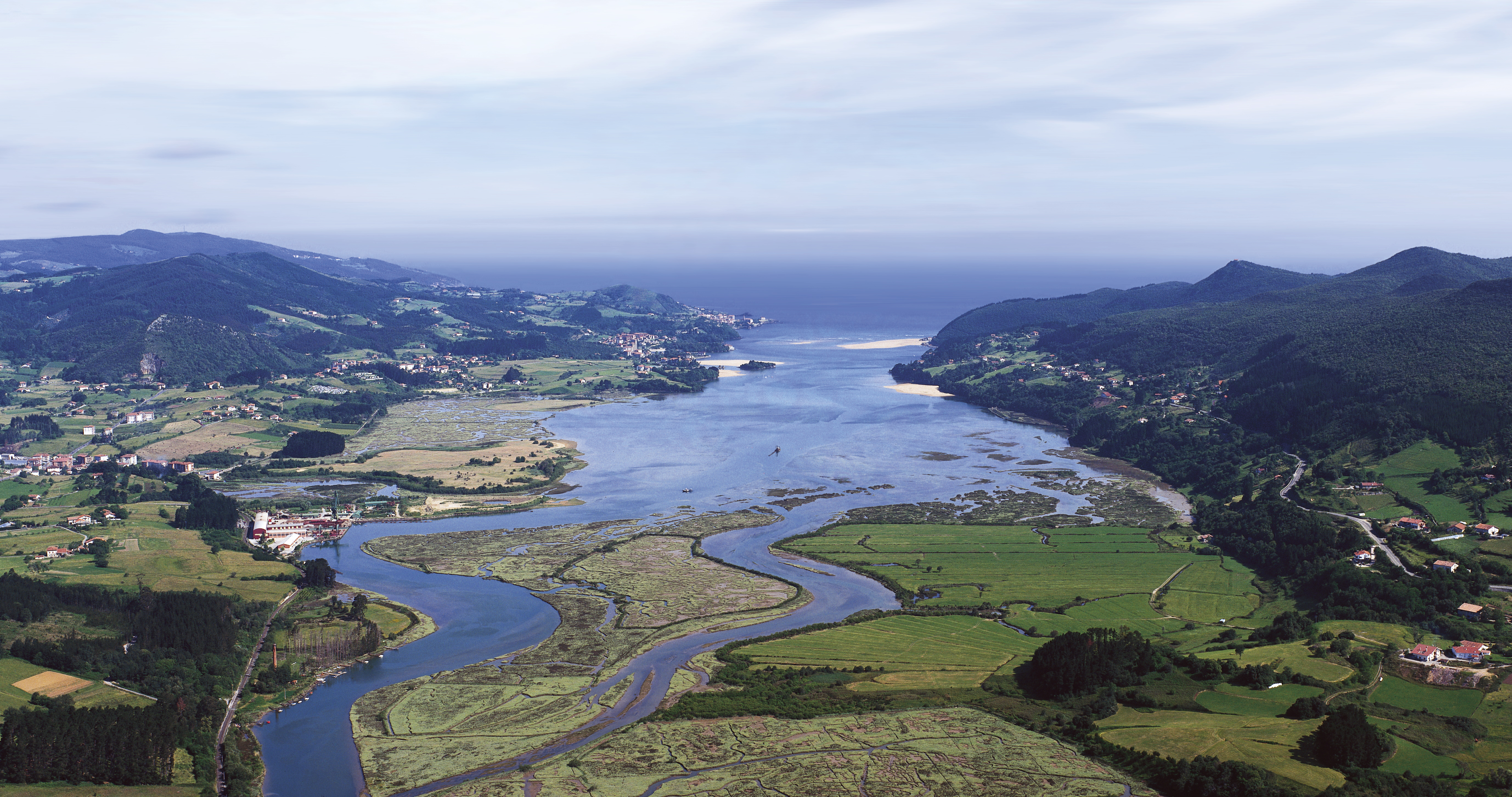
Aerial view of Urdaibai in 2000

In 2008, the museum revealed that it was looking into building a 5,000 m^{2} (53,800 sq ft) expansion in the Urdaibai estuary, a UNESCO biosphere reserve located east of Bilbao. By 2022, the Biscay government presented plans to put €40 million ($42.12M) toward the expansion. Following backlash from locals and environmental groups such as Greenpeace, SEO/BirdLife and WWF, the Guggenheim Foundation announced in December 2025 that the project had been abandoned due to "territorial, urban planning and environmental constraints and limitations".

== Building ==
=== Architecture ===
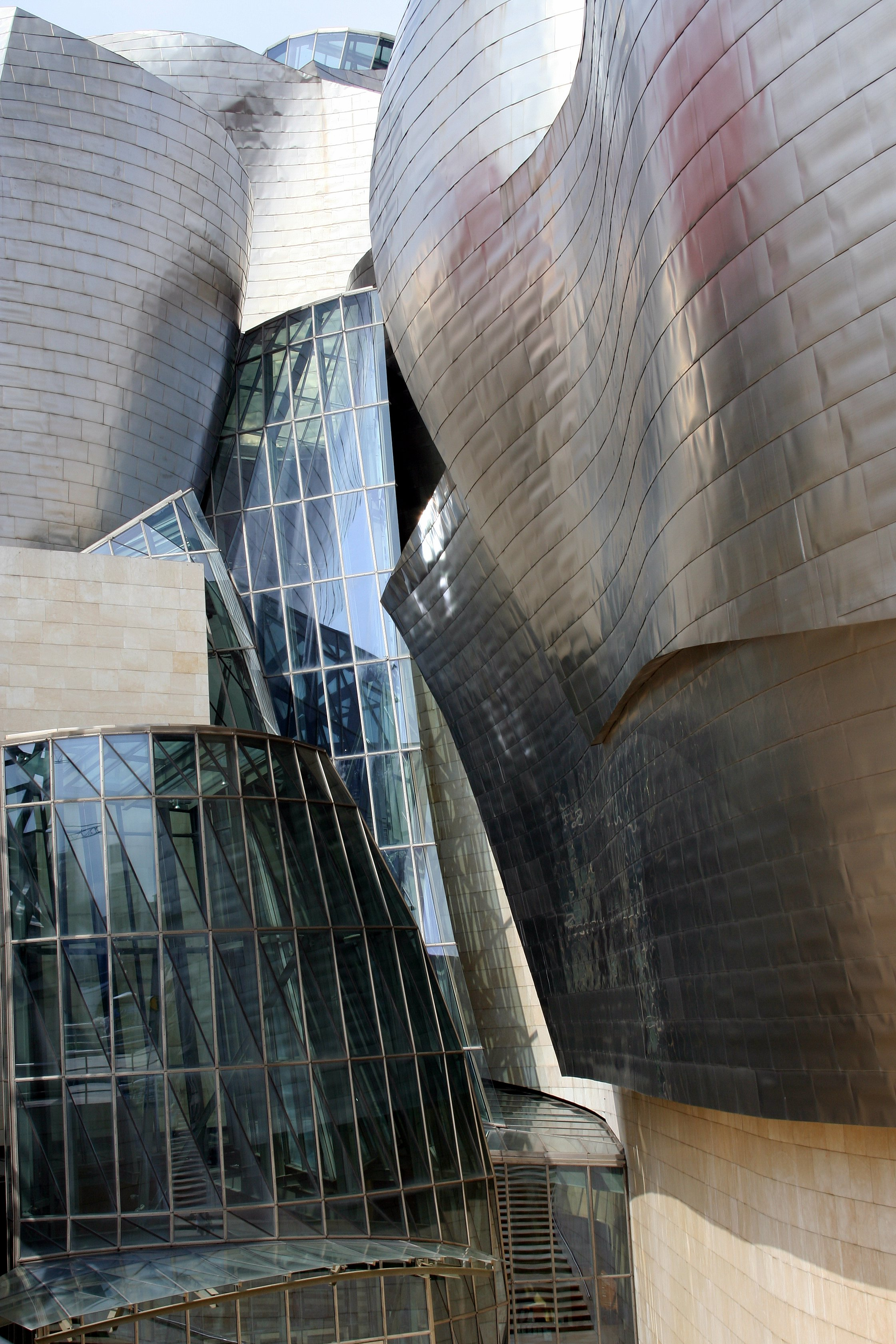
The museum is clad in glass, titanium, and limestone.

The Solomon R. Guggenheim Foundation selected Frank Gehry as the architect, and its director, Thomas Krens, encouraged him to design something daring and innovative. The curves on the exterior of the building were intended to appear random; the architect said that "the randomness of the curves are designed to catch the light". The interior "is designed around a large, light-filled atrium with views of Bilbao's estuary and the surrounding hills of the Basque country". The atrium, which Gehry nicknamed The Flower because of its shape, serves as the organizing center of the museum.

When the museum opened to the public in 1997, it was immediately hailed as one of the world's most spectacular buildings in the style of Deconstructivism (although Gehry does not associate himself with that architectural movement), a masterpiece of the 20th century. Architect Philip Johnson described it as "the greatest building of our time", while critic Calvin Tomkins, in The New Yorker, characterized it as "a fantastic dream ship of undulating form in a cloak of titanium," its brilliantly reflective panels also reminiscent of fish scales. Herbert Muschamp praised its "mercurial brilliance" in The New York Times Magazine. The Independent calls the museum "an astonishing architectural feat".

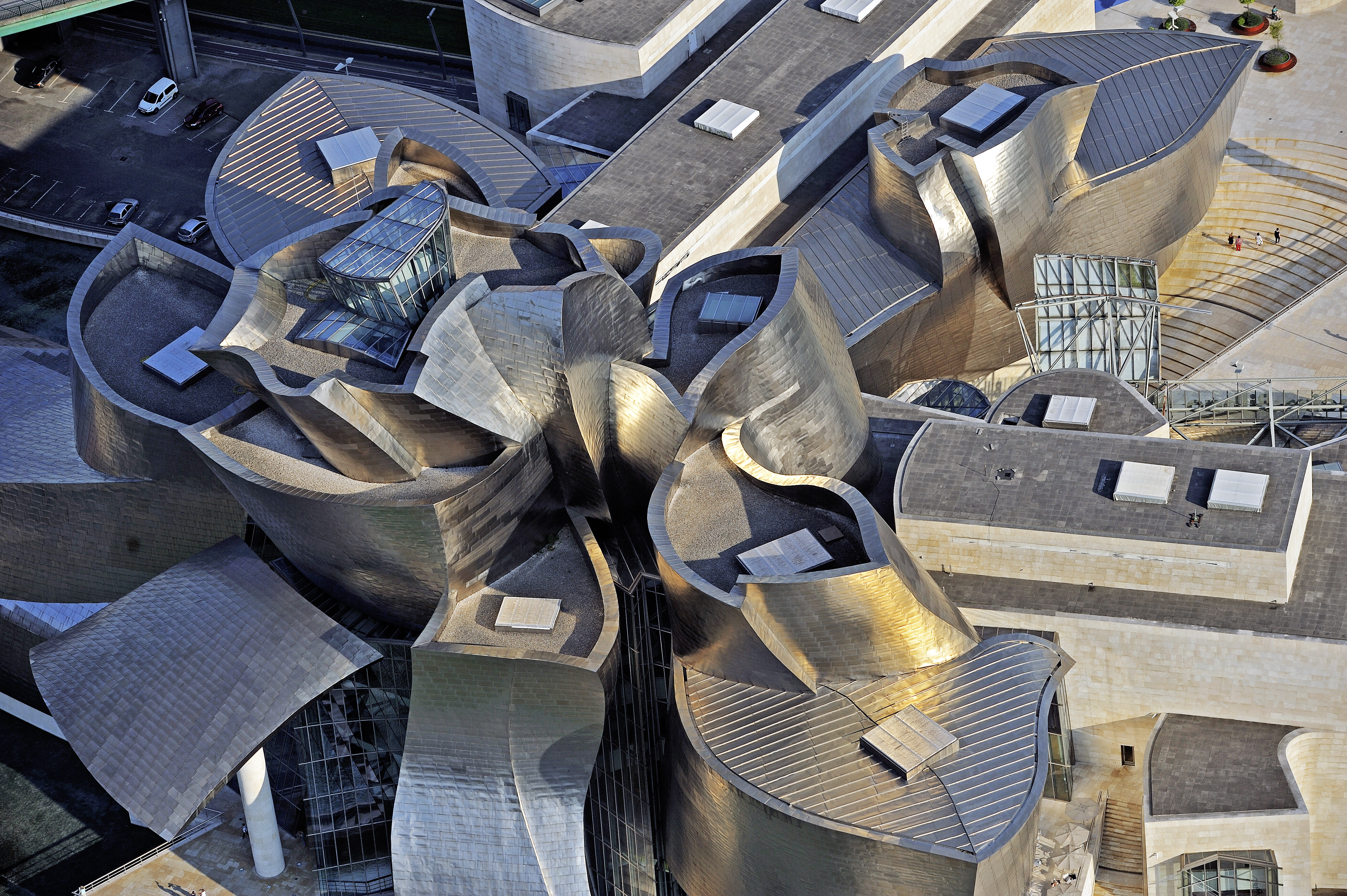
Aerial view of the museum

The museum is seamlessly integrated into the urban context, unfolding its interconnecting shapes of stone, glass and titanium on a 32,500 m^{2} (350,000 sq ft) site along the Nervión River in the ancient industrial heart of the city; while modest from street level, it is most impressive when viewed from the river. With a total 24,000 m^{2} (260,000 sq ft), of which 11,000 m^{2} (120,000 sq ft) are dedicated to exhibition space, it had more exhibition space than the three Guggenheim collections in New York and Venice combined at that time. The 11,000 m^{2} (120,000 sq ft) of exhibition space are distributed over nineteen galleries, ten of which follow a classic orthogonal plan that can be identified from the exterior by their stone finishes. The remaining nine galleries are irregularly shaped and can be identified from the outside by their swirling organic forms and titanium cladding. The largest gallery measures 130 m × 30 m (427 ft × 98 ft). In 2005, it housed Richard Serra's monumental installation The Matter of Time, which Robert Hughes dubbed "courageous and sublime".

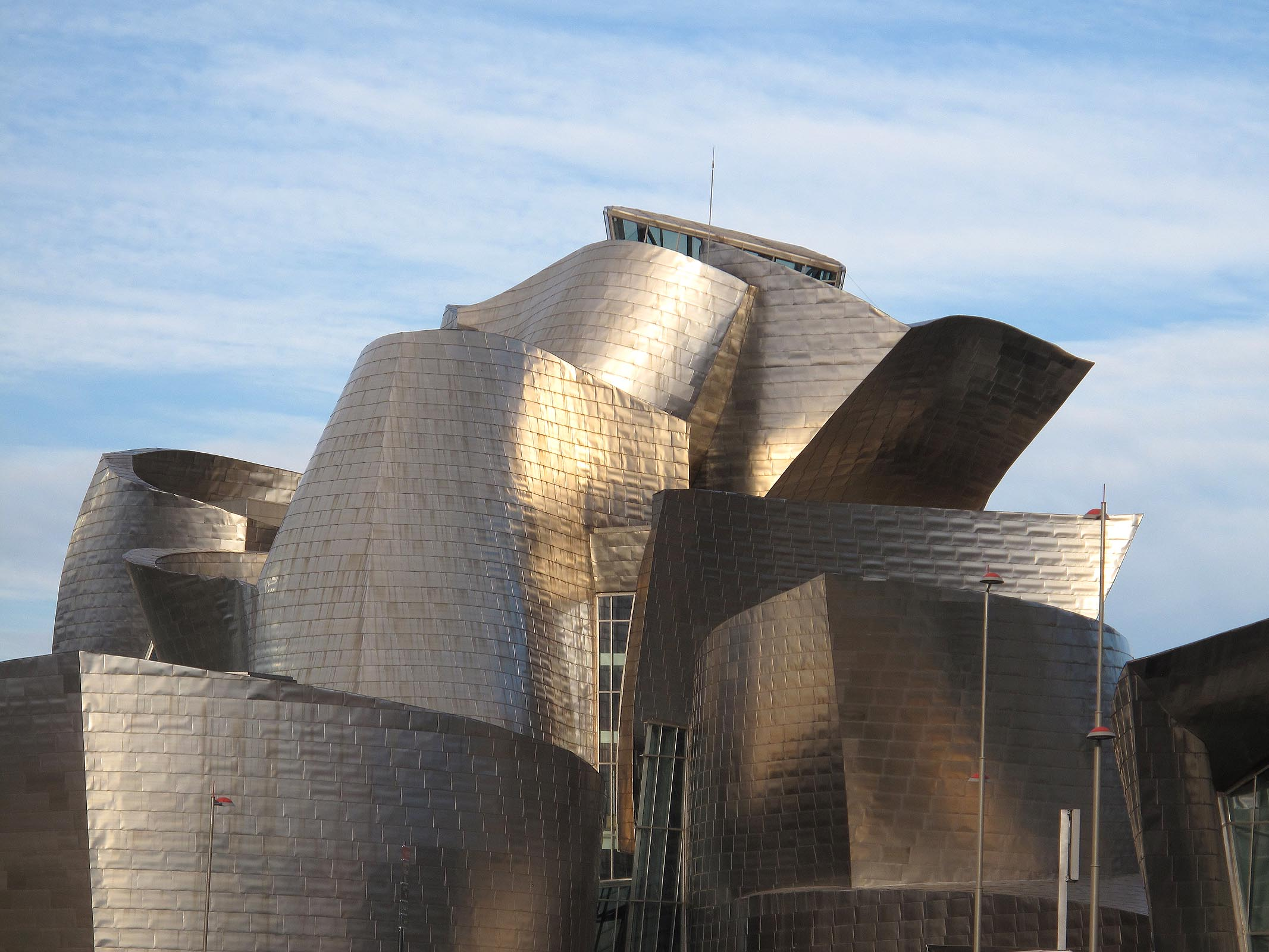
Exterior cladding

The building was constructed on time and budget, which is rare for architecture of this type. In an interview in Harvard Design Magazine, Gehry explained how he did it. First, he ensured that what he calls the "organization of the artist" prevailed during construction, to prevent political and business interests from interfering with the design. Second, he made sure he had a detailed and realistic cost estimate before proceeding. Third, he used computer visualizations produced by Rick Smith employing Dassault Systemes' CATIA V3 software and collaborated closely with the individual building trades to control costs during construction.

KLM Royal Dutch Airlines donated $1 million towards its construction.

=== Foundation ===
The museum building used more than 25,000 tonnes (25,000 long tons; 28,000 short tons) of concrete, or 10,000 m^{3} (350,000 cu ft), as it required deep and solid foundations. The foundation was laid on reinforced concrete piles driven into the bedrock at an average depth of 14 m (46 ft).

The building sits on a clay base from the bed of the nearby Estuary of Bilbao and required the embedment of 665 pilings, driven into the ground by boring machines.

=== Cladding ===
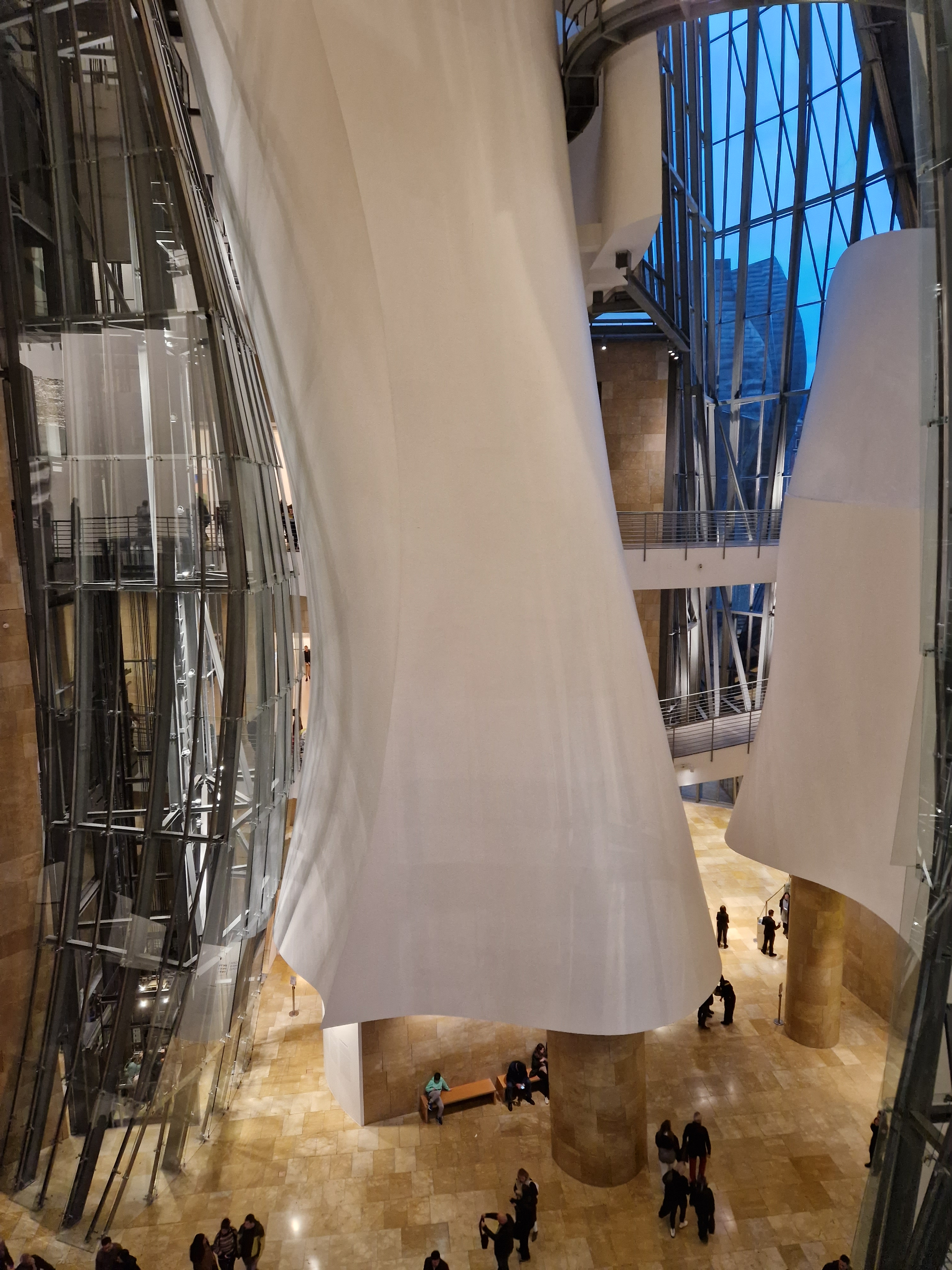
Interior of the atrium

The base of the building is covered with beige limestone from the Huéscar quarries near Granada, cut from 50 mm (2.0 in) thick slabs. The building is clear thanks to the walls, specially treated to protect the interior from the effects of the sun. The glass of the windows has also been treated to prevent light from damaging the exposed pieces.

It is clad in titanium plates, arranged in scales, on a galvanized steel structure. The museum's exterior skin is made of 33,000 titanium plates, a material that has been used to replace copper or lead because of their toxicity. Many tests have been carried out with different materials to find one that would withstand heat and bad weather, while maintaining its character. It was during this research process that tests were started on titanium samples and the best treatment was found.

Its lamination process is delicate and has to be done in places with high energy sources, that is why the laminated parts were made in Pittsburgh, in the United States, the rolling allowed to obtain titanium plates only 0.4 mm (0.016 in) thick, which is much thinner than if steel plates had been used. Moreover, titanium is about half the weight of steel, and the museum's titanium coating represents only 60 t (59 long tons; 66 short tons).

During the conception, the pieces were designed to resist the bad weather, that is why a quilted rather than undulated shape was chosen, to resist the wind, and to avoid vibrations during storms.

Titanium is a low-polluting material, and each part has been designed differently according to its orientation on the building, so they correspond perfectly with the curves desired by Gehry.

== Virtual Building ==
In the fall of 1993, architects at Gehry Partners began to use Dassault Systèmes' CATIA software for the schematic design phase of the museum to digitize and model the exterior of the museum project. Essentially, this software calculated point by point the stresses to which materials are subjected, by generating a 3D model showing the different tensions and allowing the values of many structural elements of the museum to be calculated: the steel structure, titanium cladding or foundations, among others. It also helped to automate the cutting of materials such as stone or titanium plates.

The architects applied Master Modeling and Virtual Build Processes they learned from Rick Smith and his use of the same techniques on the Walt Disney Concert Hall during the previous two years. The success and global awareness of the Guggenheim Museum Bilbao ushered in a new era of Virtual Building and was a catalyst for what would become popularly known as Building Information Modeling seven years later.

Architectural critic Paul Goldberger shares the words of others that Bilbao "could not have been constructed without CATIA". He further stated that Bilbao "was the first building for which CATIA played a role in almost every aspect of the design and construction process".

== Exhibitions ==
The museum houses "large-scale, site-specific works and installations by contemporary artists", such as Richard Serra's 100 m (330 ft) Snake, and displays the work of Basque artists, "as well as housing a selection of works" from the foundation's modern art collection. In 1997, the museum opened with "The Guggenheim Museums and the Art of This Century", a 300-piece overview of 20th-century art from Cubism to new media art. Most pieces came from the Guggenheim's permanent collection, but the museum also acquired paintings by Willem de Kooning, Mark Rothko and Clyfford Still and commissioned new works by Francesco Clemente, Anselm Kiefer, Jenny Holzer and Richard Serra.

The exhibitions change often; the museum generally hosts thematic exhibitions, centered for example on Chinese or Russian art. Traditional paintings and sculptures are a minority compared to installations and electronic forms. The highlight of the collection, and its only permanent exhibit, is The Matter of Time (incorporating an earlier work, Snake), a series of weathering steel sculptures designed by Serra, which is housed in the 130 m (430 ft) Arcelor Gallery (formerly known as the Fish Gallery but renamed in 2005 for the steel manufacturer that sponsored the project). The collections usually highlight Avant-garde art, 20th century abstraction, and non-objective art. When the museum announced the 2011 exhibition "The Luminous Interval", a show of artwork belonging to Greek businessman Dimitris Daskalopoulos, who is also a museum trustee, this met with criticism of, among other things, too much curatorial power for a serious benefactor. In 2005, Olivier Berggruen and Ingrid Pfeiffer curated a retrospective of Yves Klein. In 2012 David Hockney's exhibition drew over 290,000 visitors to the museum.

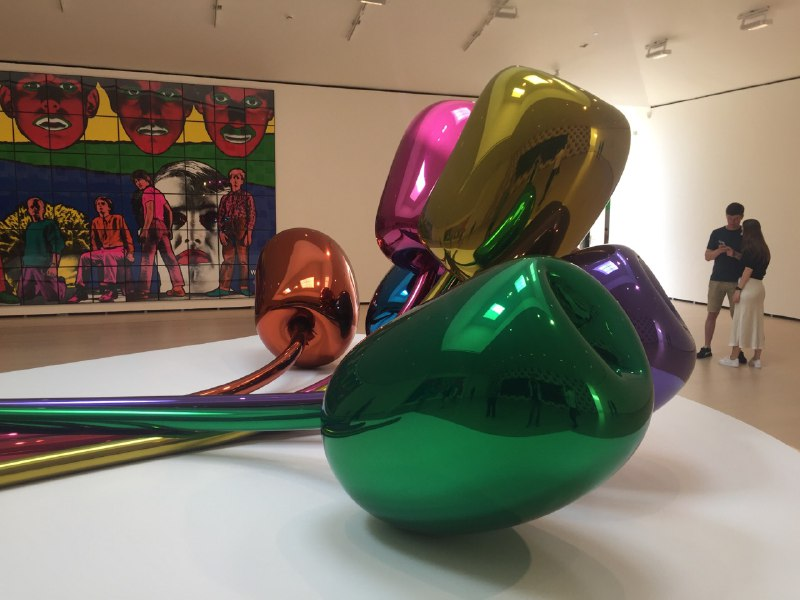
Tulips by Jeff Koons

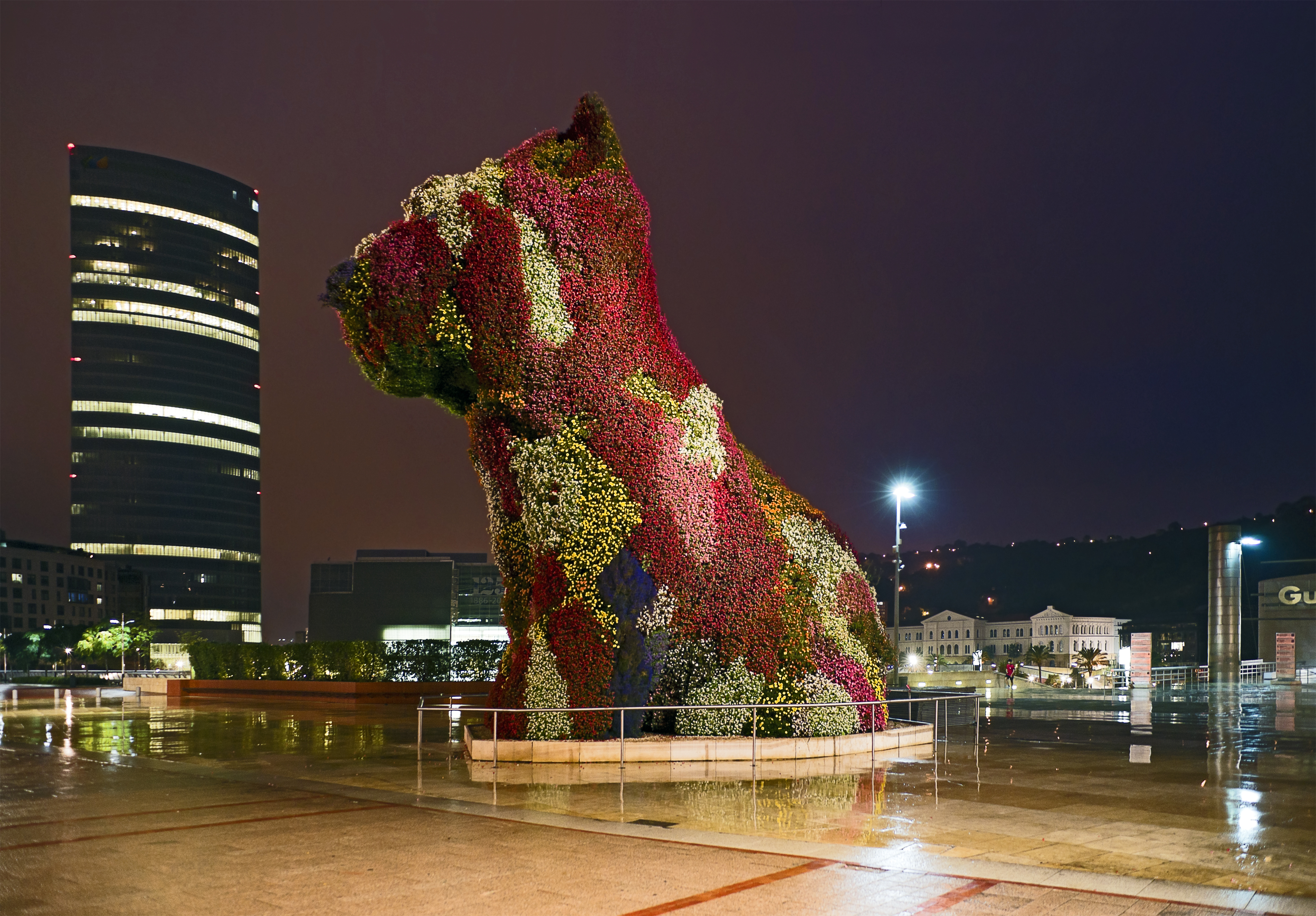
Puppy by Jeff Koons in front of the museum

== Economic and media impact ==
The museum was opened as part of a revitalization effort for the city of Bilbao, and its impact on the city quarter became known as the Bilbao effect. Almost immediately after its opening, the Guggenheim Bilbao became a popular tourist attraction, drawing visitors from around the globe. In its first three years, almost 4 million tourists visited the museum, helping to generate about €500 million in economic activity. The regional council estimated that the money visitors spent on hotels, restaurants, shops and transport allowed it to collect €100 million in taxes, which more than paid for the building cost.

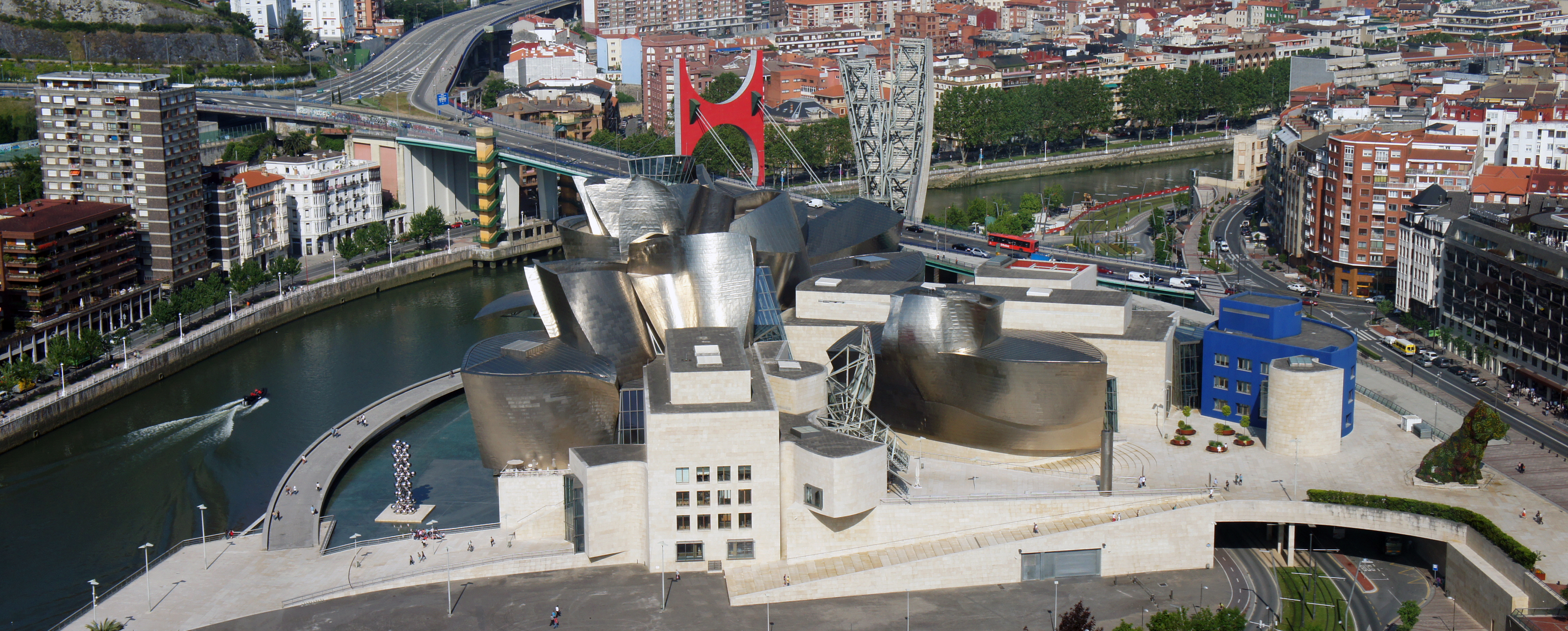
Aerial view of the Guggenheim Museum Bilbao

The building was featured in the 1999 James Bond film The World Is Not Enough in the pre-title sequence and the Tamil film Sivaji: The Boss (2007), in which it is the setting for the music video of the song "Style", composed by A. R. Rahman. Mariah Carey's music video "Sweetheart", directed by Hype Williams, shows singers Jermaine Dupri and Carey in various locations at the Guggenheim Museum Bilbao.

== Criticism ==
The term "Bilbao effect", referring to how the museum transformed the city, has also been employed by critics who have denounced the museum as a symbol of gentrification and cultural imperialism. The Wall Street Journal suggested that the Bilbao effect should be called the Bilbao anomaly, "for the iconic chemistry between the design of building, its image and the public turns out to be rather rare."

Art critic Brian O'Doherty was positive about approaching the building but criticized the museum's interior effect, saying "[O]nce you get indoors things are a little different. Even the so-called site-specific works didn't look too happy to me. Most of the interior spaces are too vast." He went on to describe how works by Braque, Picasso and Rodchenko "looked absurd" and tiny on the museum's walls.

== Controversies ==
=== Management and 2007 embezzlement incident ===
According to a report issued in 2007 by the Basque Court of Auditors, the museum paid more than $27 million for the acquisition of art between 2002 and 2005, including Serra's The Matter of Time for the cavernous ground-floor gallery. After another audit in 2008 revealed that money was missing from accounts, the foundation said that it filed a case against the director, Roberto Cearsolo Barrenetxea, "for financial and accounting irregularities", asserting that he had admitted diverting money from two companies that manage the Guggenheim Bilbao building and its art collection to his own account since 1998.

=== 2021–2022 strike ===
In 2021–2022, the eighteen cleaners (mostly women) went on strike for nine months until they got raises and full-time contracts.

== Gallery ==
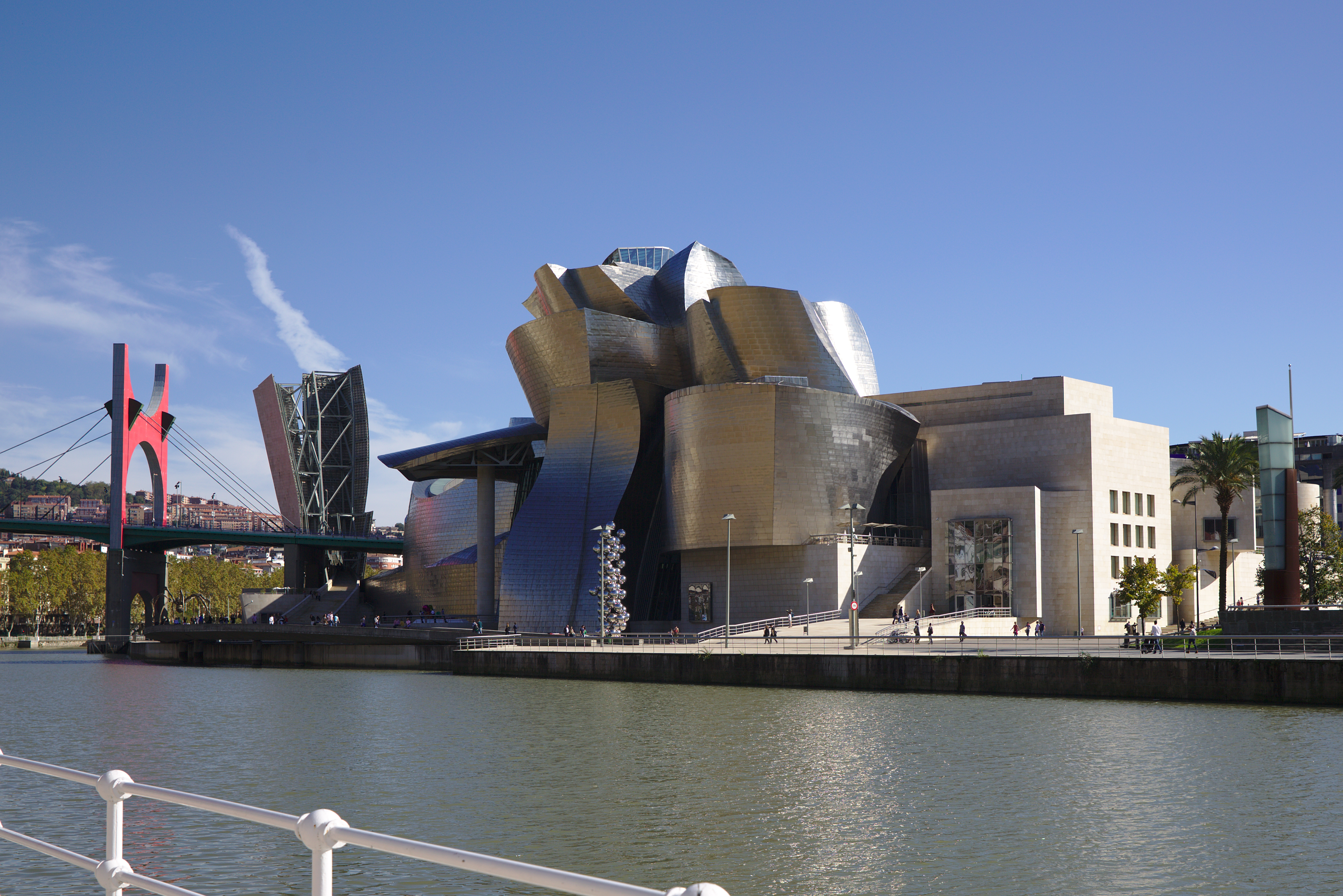
The museum over the river

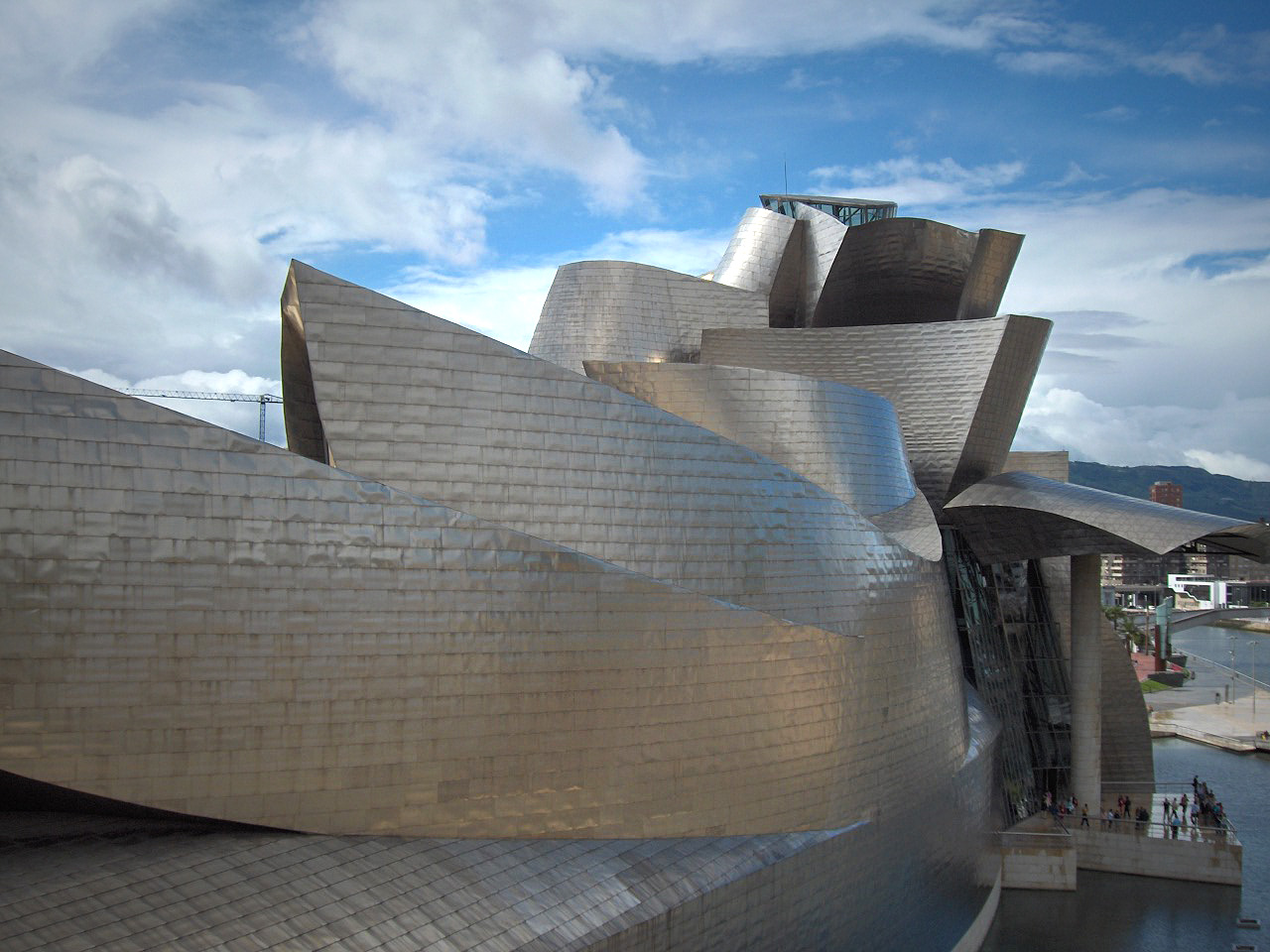
Rear façade close-up

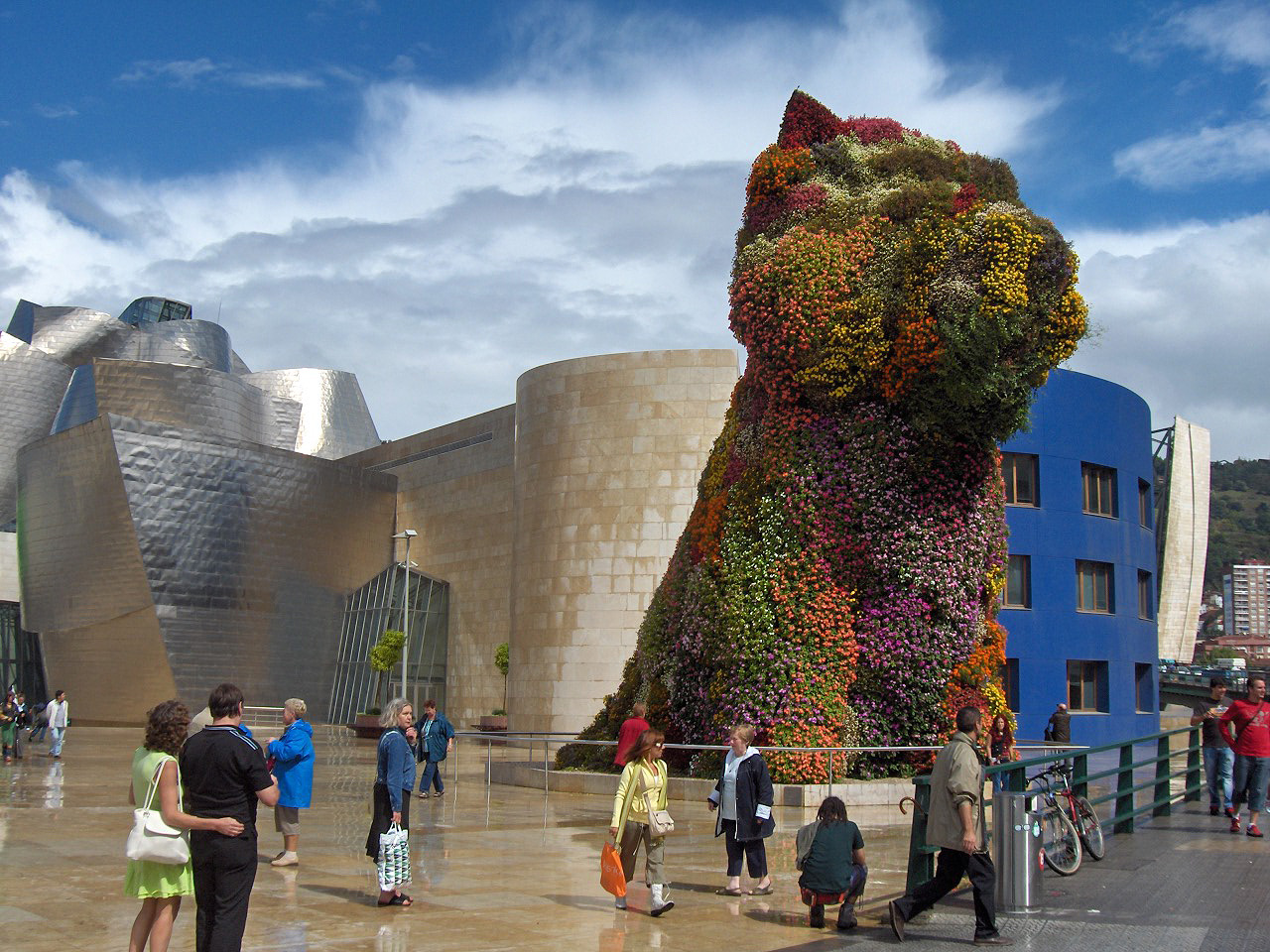
Bilbao Puppy by Jeff Koons

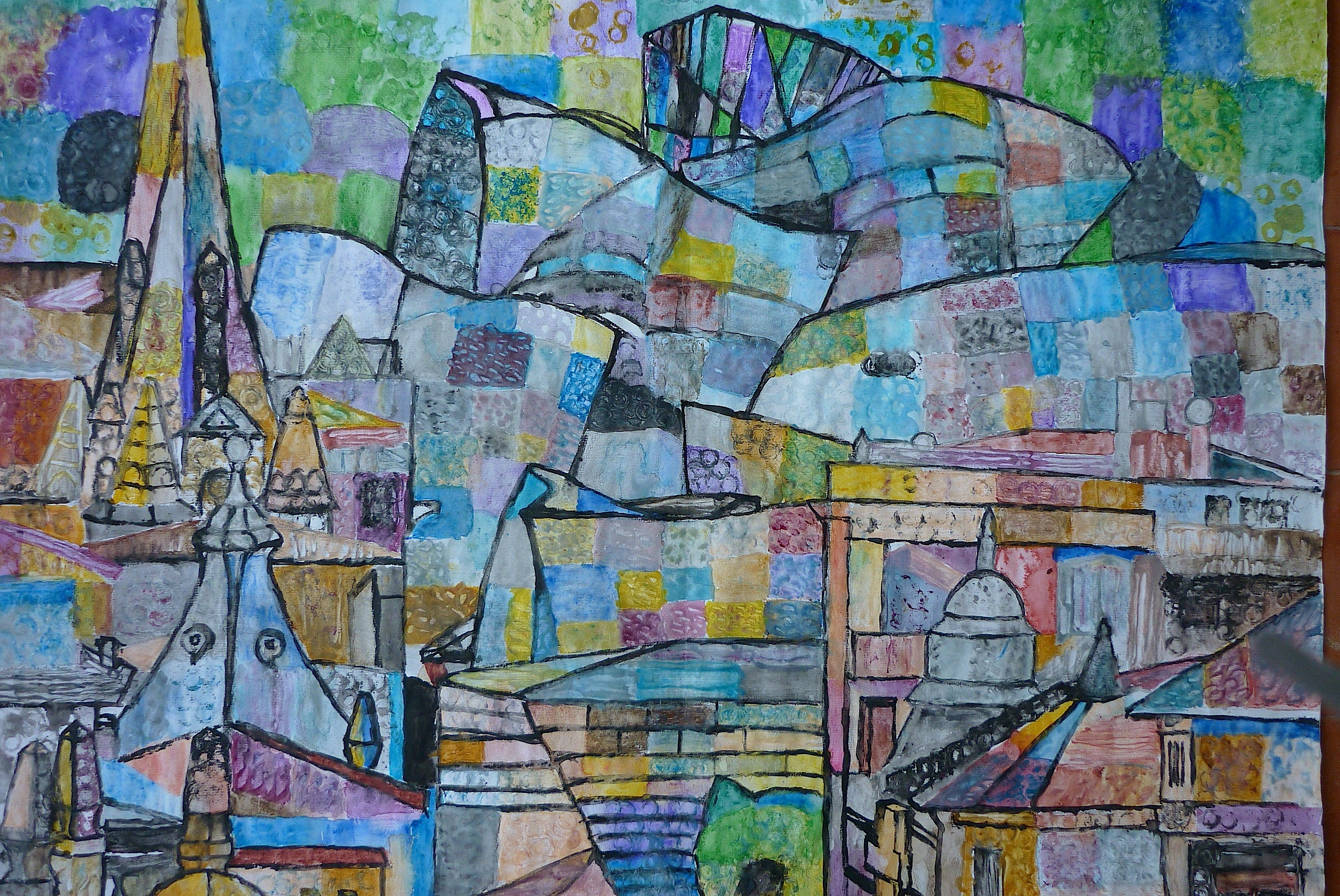
Acrylics on fine art paper painting by Iñaki Crespo

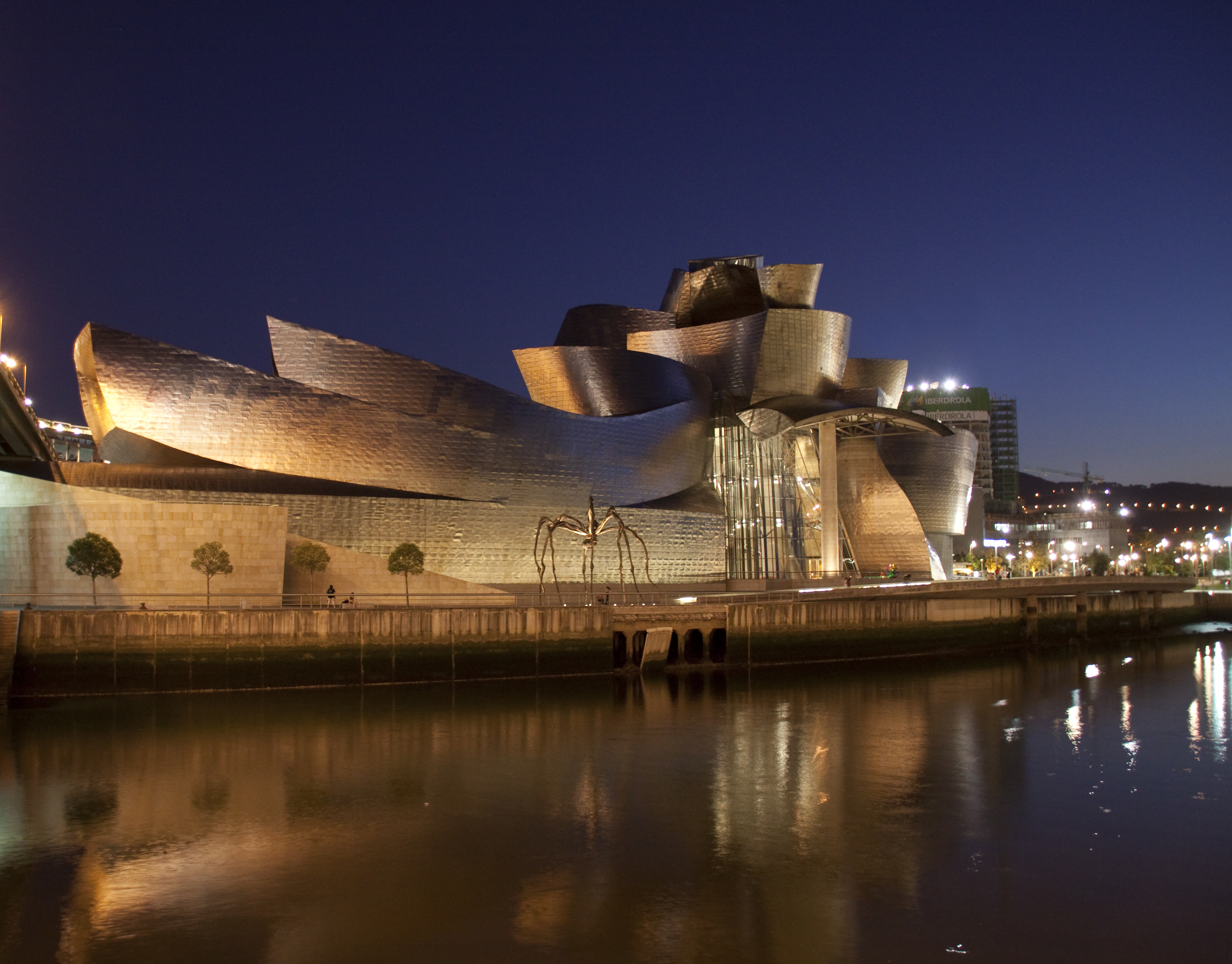
The museum at night

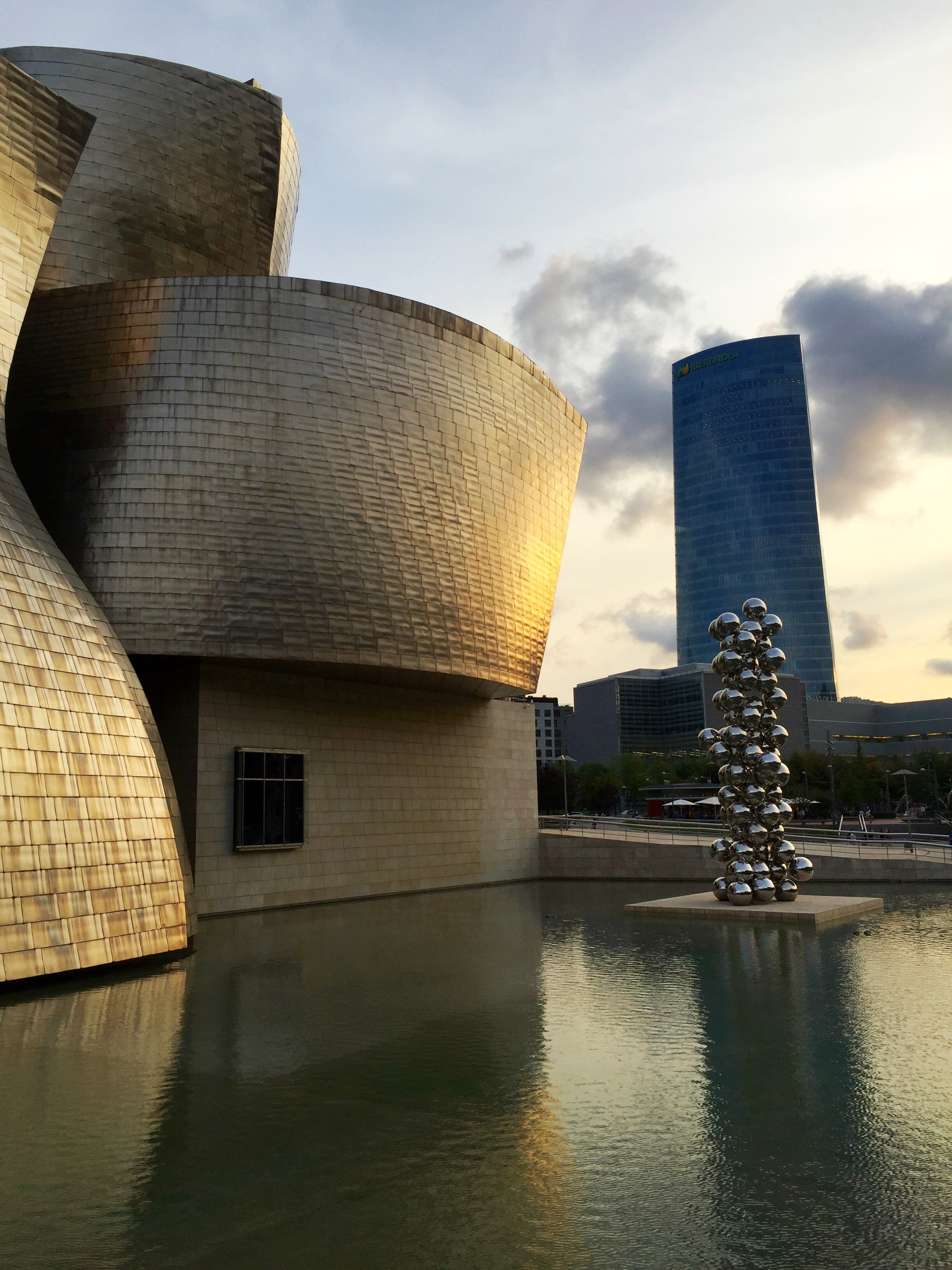
The museum at sunset

== See also ==
- 12 Treasures of Spain
- Guggenheim family
- List of Guggenheim Museums
- List of largest art museums
- List of works by Frank Gehry
- The Globalized City
- World Architecture Survey
