= The Matter of Time =

Sculpture by Richard Serra

The Matter of Time (in Spanish: La materia del tiempo) is an installation comprising eight pieces of torqued ellipses made of weathering steel (COR-TEN steel), by the US sculptor Richard Serra. It incorporates a series of seven sculptures made of sheets of steel welded to form 14-foot (4.3 m)-high curling walls positioned around the existing sculpture, Snake (Serpiente), that had been commissioned for the museum's opening in 1997.

Commissioned by the Museo Guggenheim Bilbao, it forms part of the permanent exhibition since 2005. Reviewing the work for The Guardian, art critic Robert Hughes, considered the work to be that of "the best sculptor alive..." going on to add that Serra was also "the only great one at work anywhere in the early 21st century.".

Made at the rolling mill at Siegen, Germany, and weighing in total 1034 tonnes, it is installed in the museum's main gallery, the 430-foot (130 m) 80-foot (24 m) Arcelor Gallery, named after its sponsor, but originally known as the Fish Gallery.

== Components ==
Arranged "to move the viewer through them and through the space surrounding them", the installation comprises the following pieces (in order of proximity to the entrance):

1. Torqued Spiral (Closed Open Closed Open Closed) (Torsión espiral (cerrada abierta cerrada abierta cerrada) (2003–04);
2. Torqued Ellipse (Torsión elíptica) (2003–04);
3. Double Torqued Ellipse (Torsión elíptica doble) (2003–04);
4. Snake (Serpiente) (1994–97);
5. Torqued Spiral (Right Left) (Torsión espiral (derecha izquierda) (2003–04);
6. Torqued Spiral (Open Left Closed Right) (Torsión espiral (izquierda abierta derecha cerrada) (2003–04);
7. Between the Torus and the Sphere (Entre el toro y la esfera) (2003–05);
8. Blind Spot Reversed (Punto ciego invertido) (2003–05).
