= Edwin Leventon =

English cricketer

- Born: Edwin Charles Leventon; 6 April 1845; Nottingham
- Died: 21 August 1909 (aged 64); Huyton-with-Roby

Edwin Leventon (6 April 1845 – 21 August 1909), fully known as Edwin Charles Leventon, was an English cricketer. He was born in Nottingham and died in Huyton-with-Roby.

Leventon played cricket locally for Huyton Cricket Club, and played his first and only match for Lancashire in 1867. Batting in the tailend, he was unable to greatly influence the game with his batting, but took two important wickets with the ball.
