= Rosie Leventon =

British visual artist

Rosie Leventon is a British visual artist whose practice encompasses sculpture, installation, land art, drawing and painting. She is known for making sculptural installations that reference current issues as well as the natural environment, prehistoric archaeology and vernacular architecture.

== Work and career ==
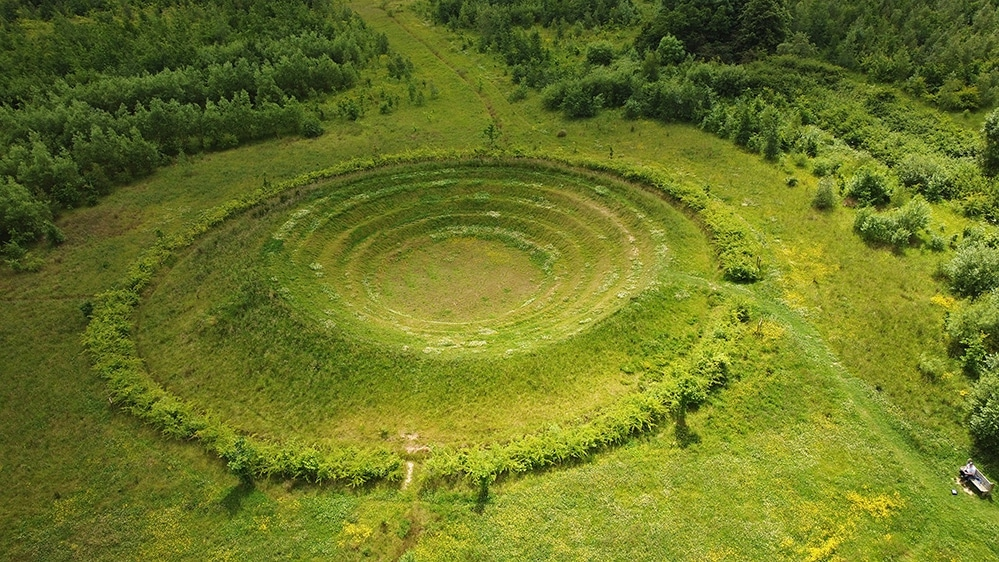
Now and Then, 2014 onwards

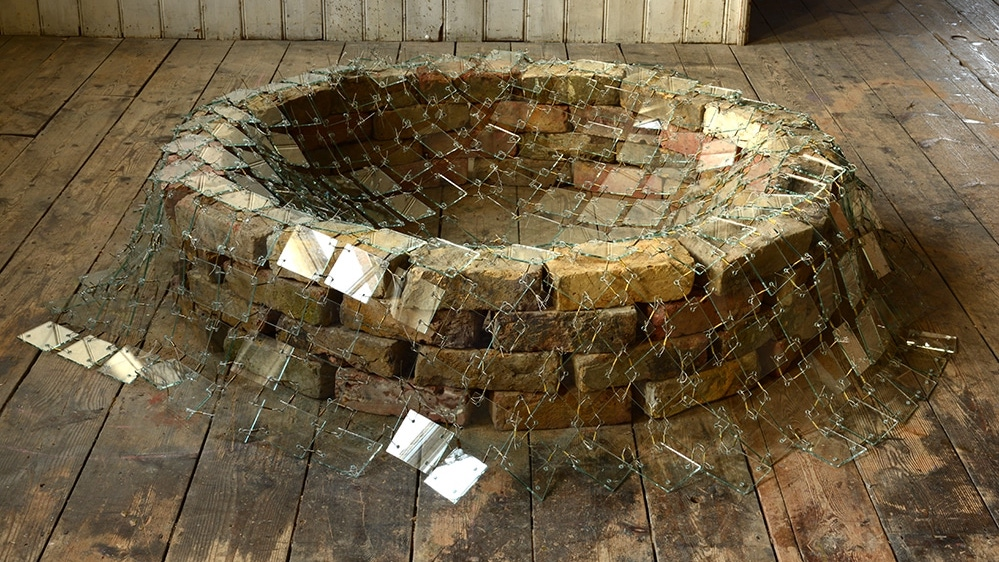
Ripple of Light, 2020

Leventon studied Chinese Language & Archaeology from 1974 to 1975 at London University, before completing her bachelor's degree in Fine Art from Croydon College of Art (1976–1979), followed by a postgraduate degree in Advanced Sculpture at Central St Martins School of Art 1980–81.

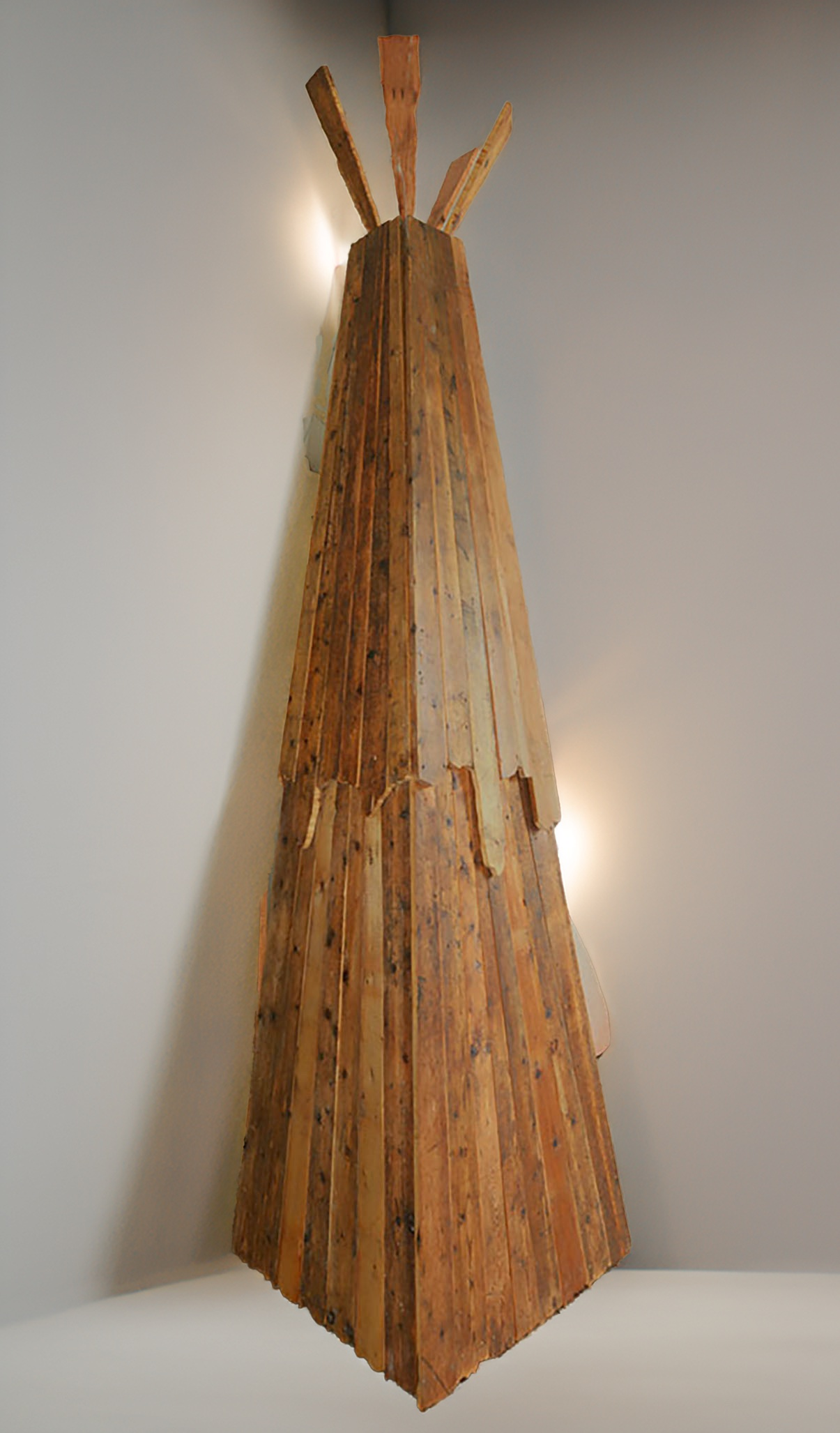
Bird Tower, 2025

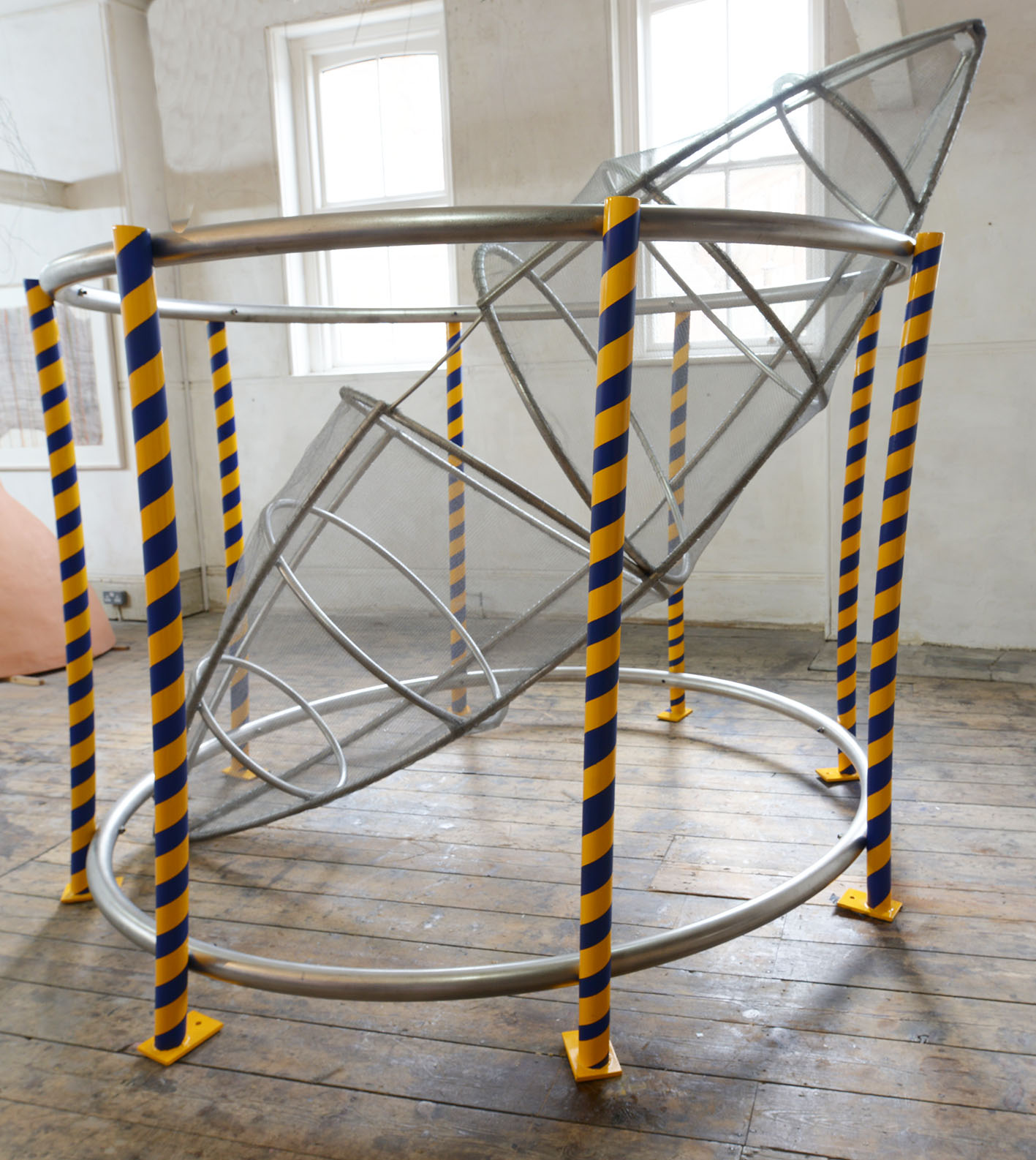
Astropod, 2024

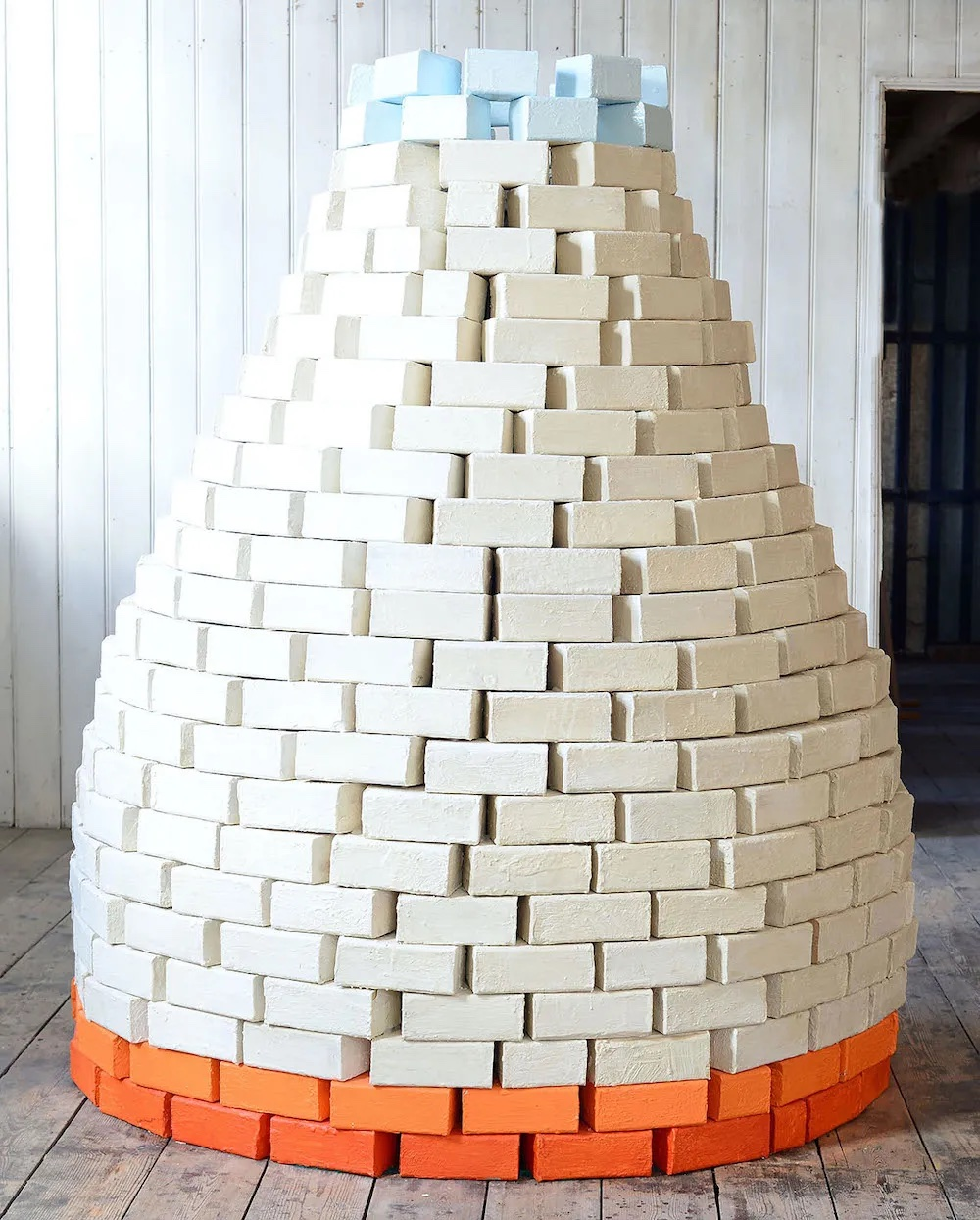
High Firings, 2023

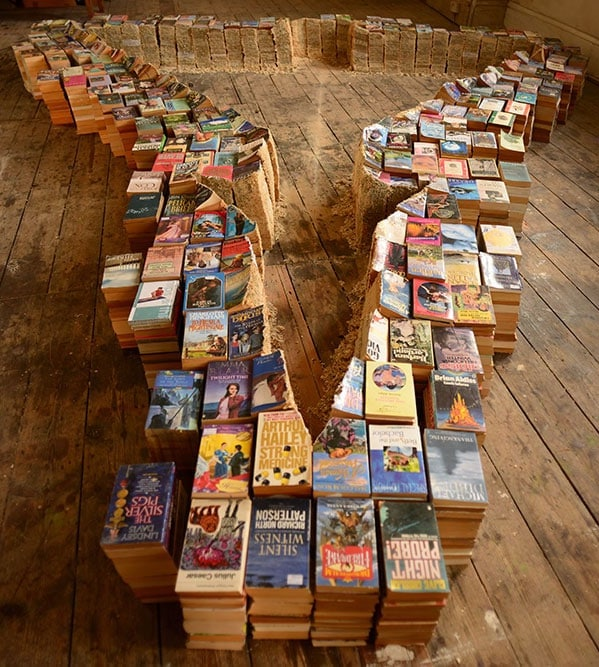
F2 Typhoon Eurofighter, 2012-13

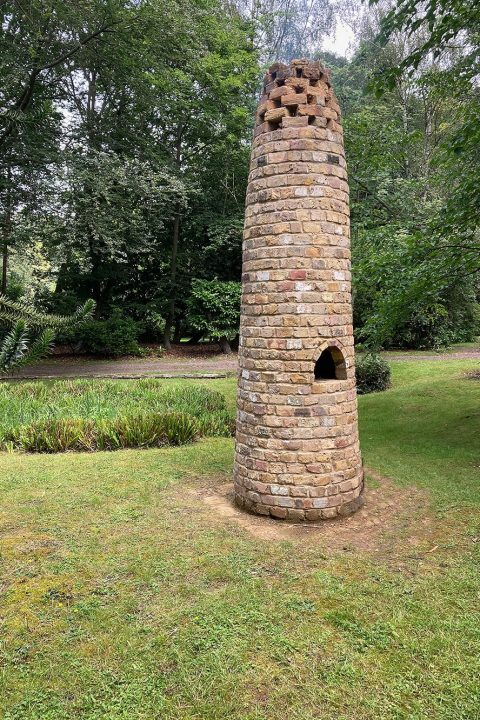
Blowing Hot and Cold, 2021

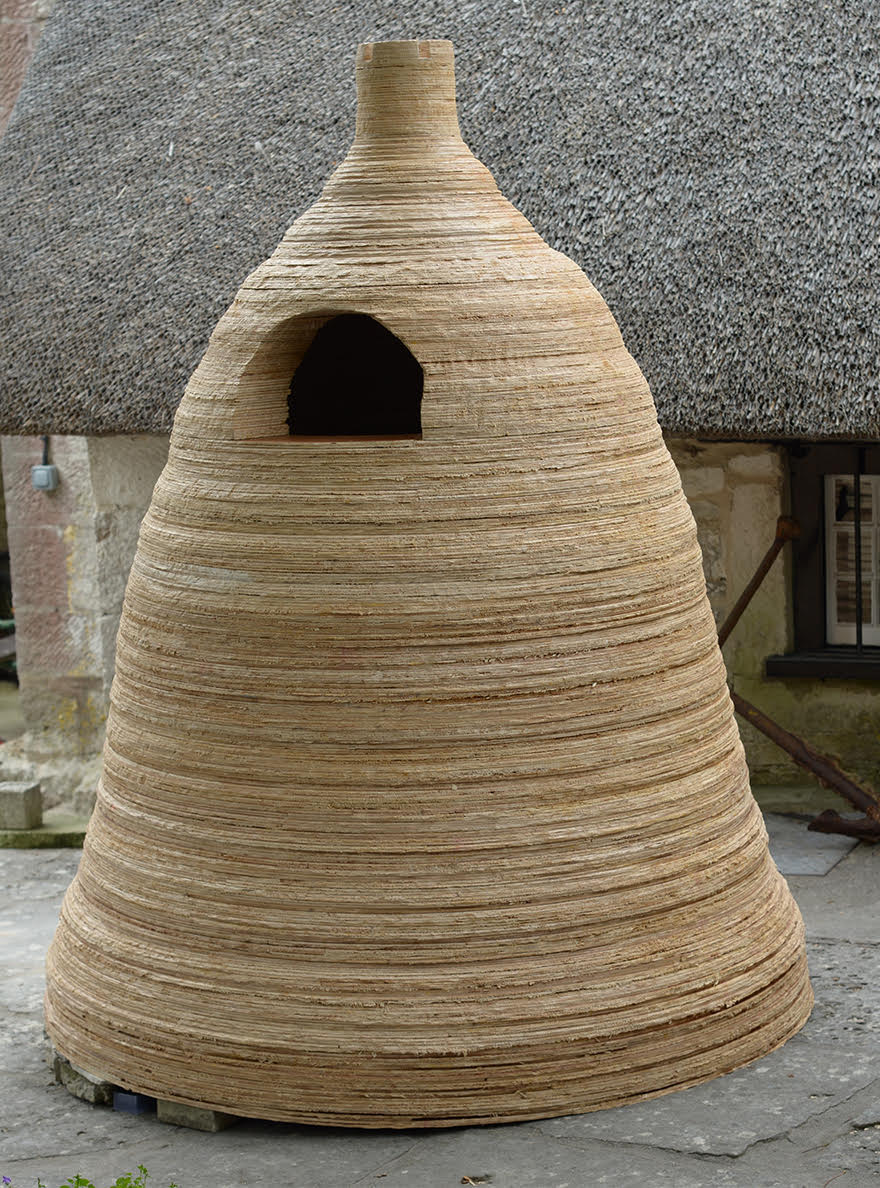
Endangered Dust, 2018

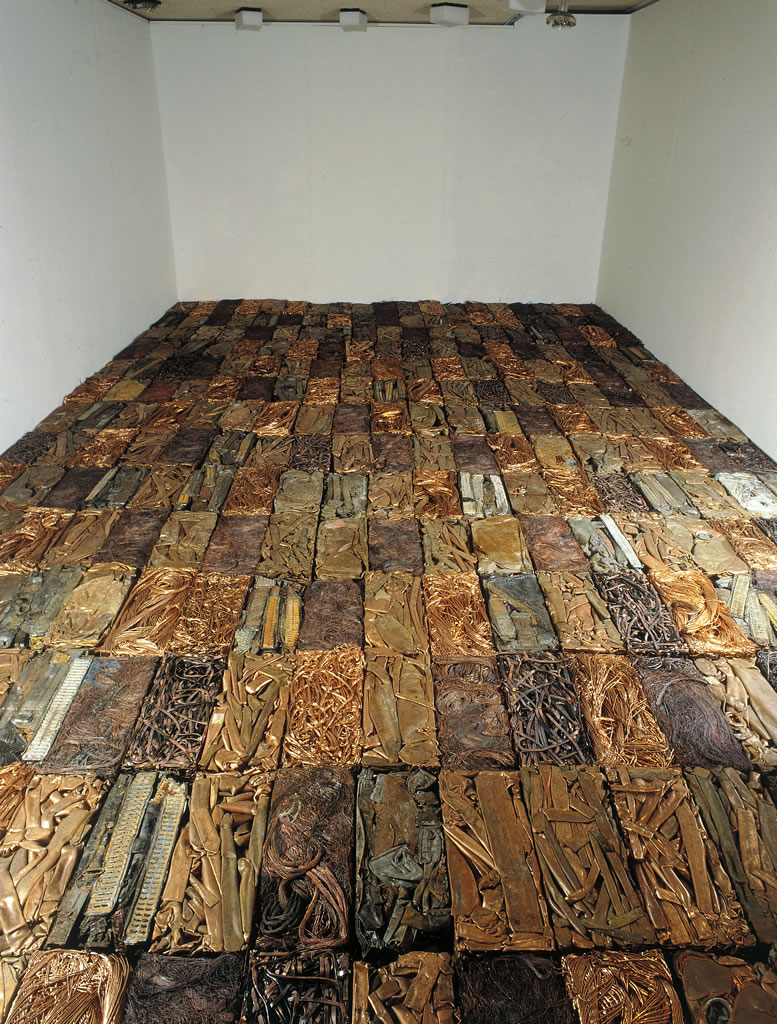
False Floor 4, 1991 - 2009

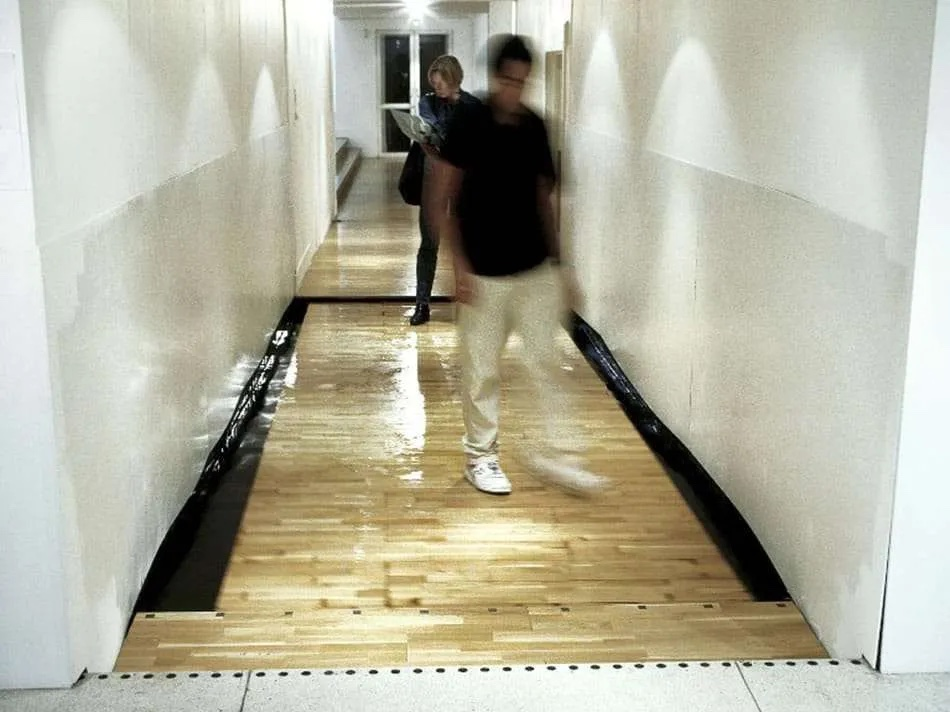
Forward March – a Floating Corridor, 1997

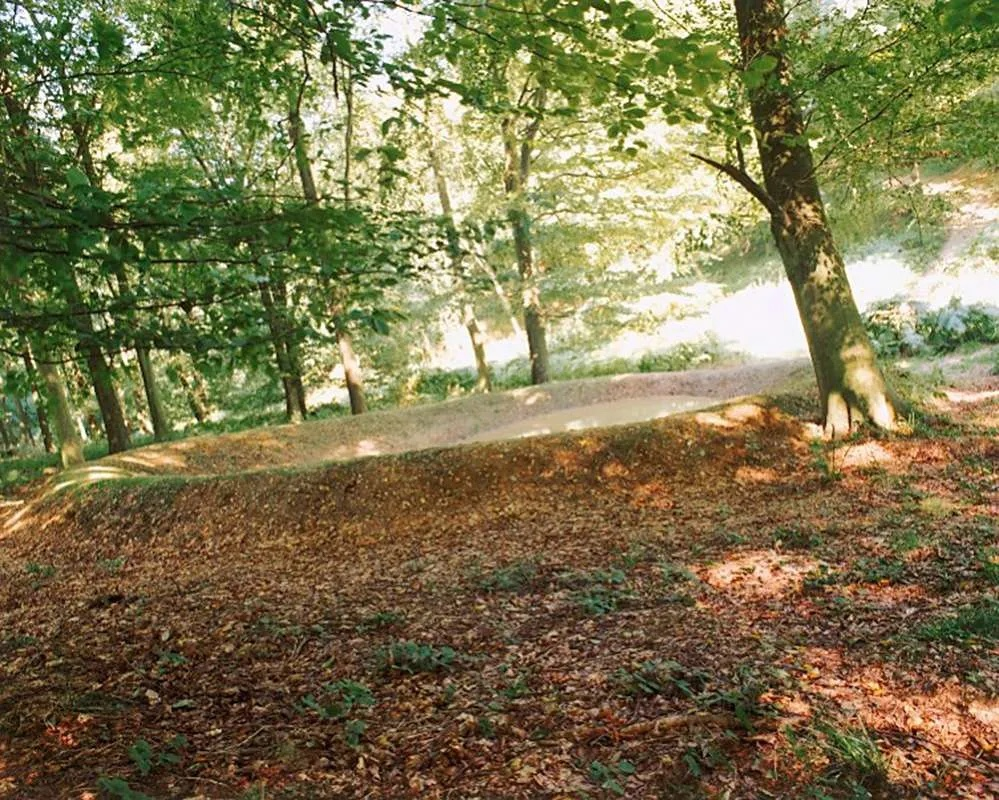
Ring, 2004

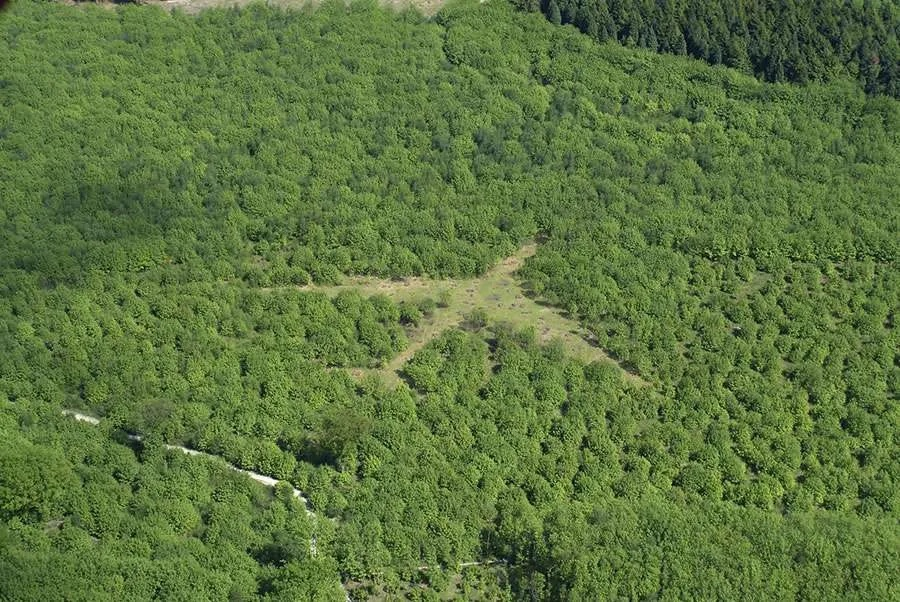
B52, 2004

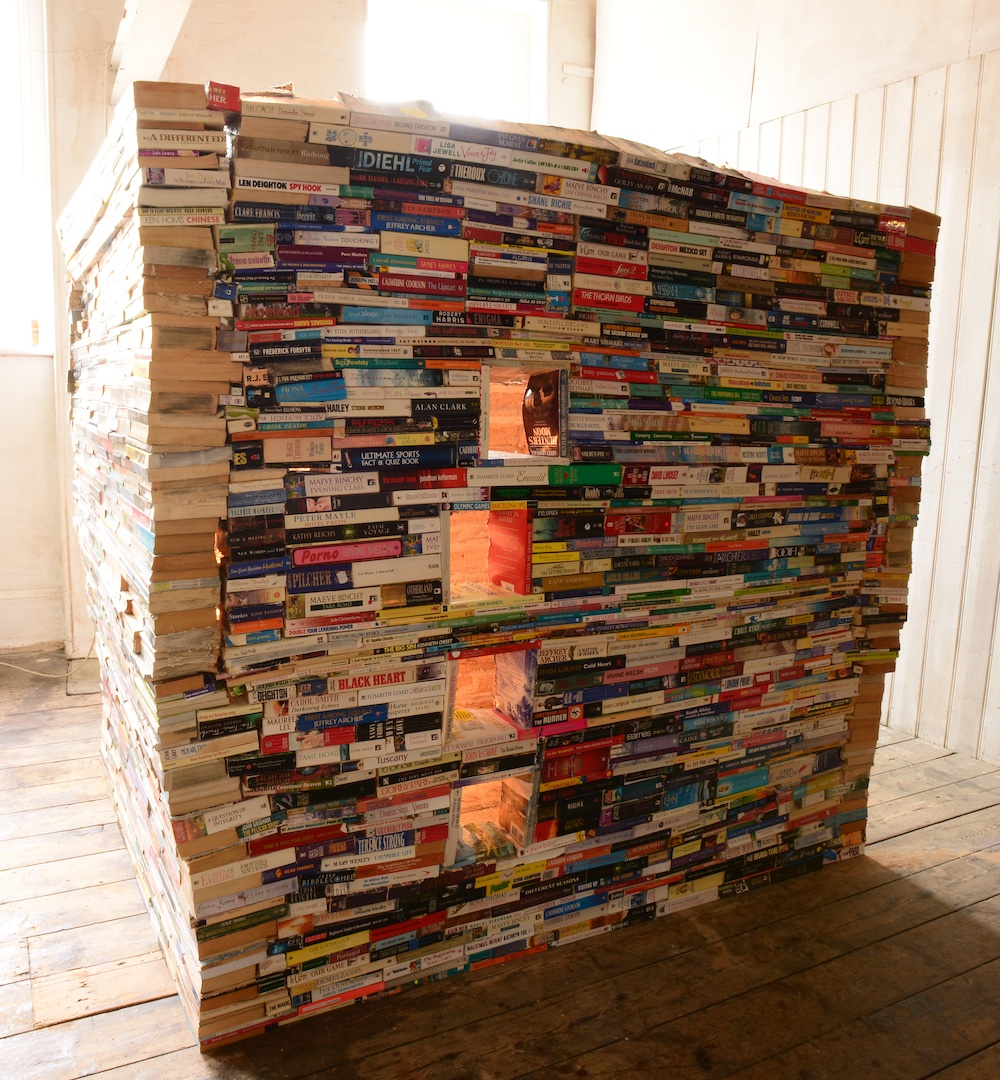
Somewhere a door slammed…, 2009

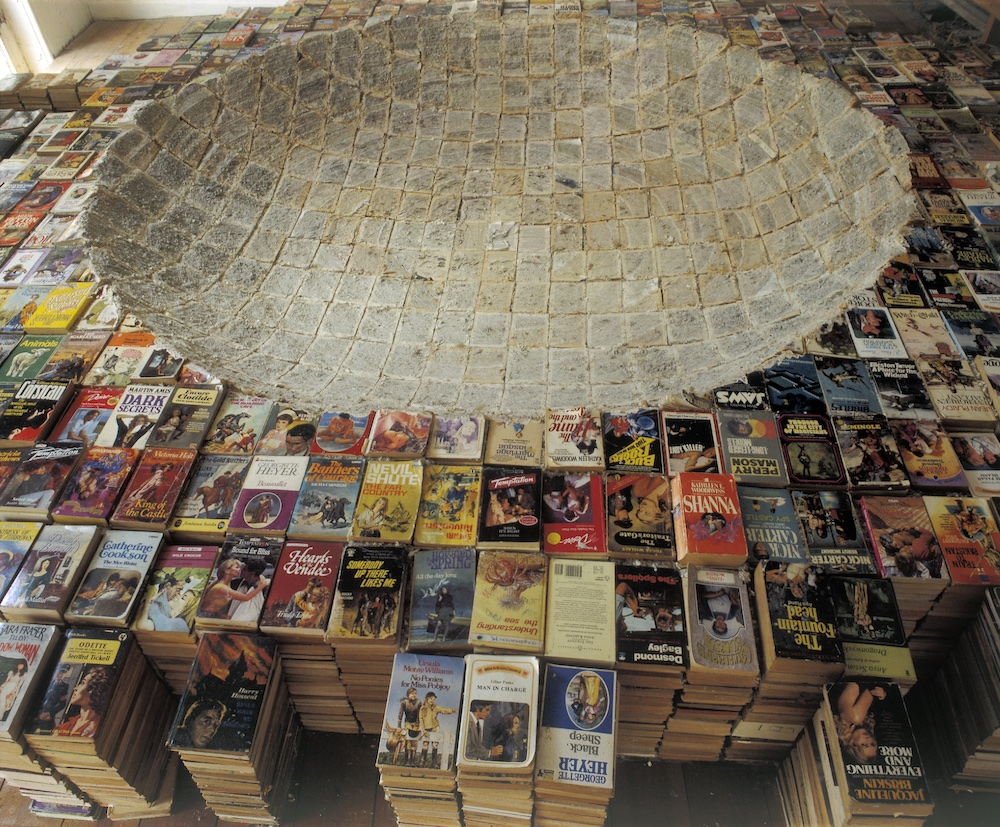
A Long Way from the Bathroom 2, 2009

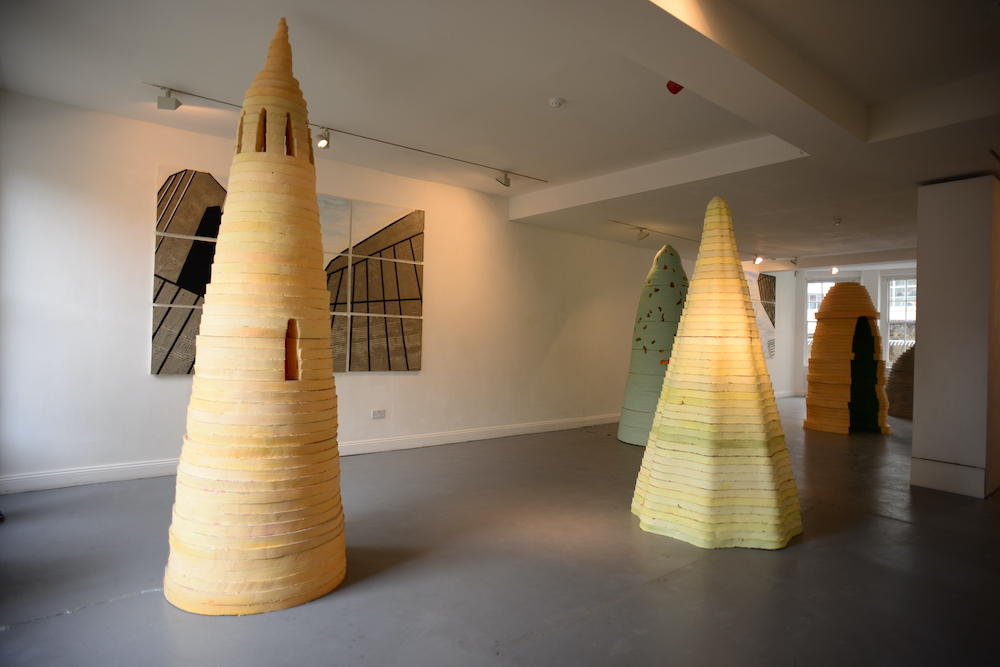
Up The Duff, 2015-19

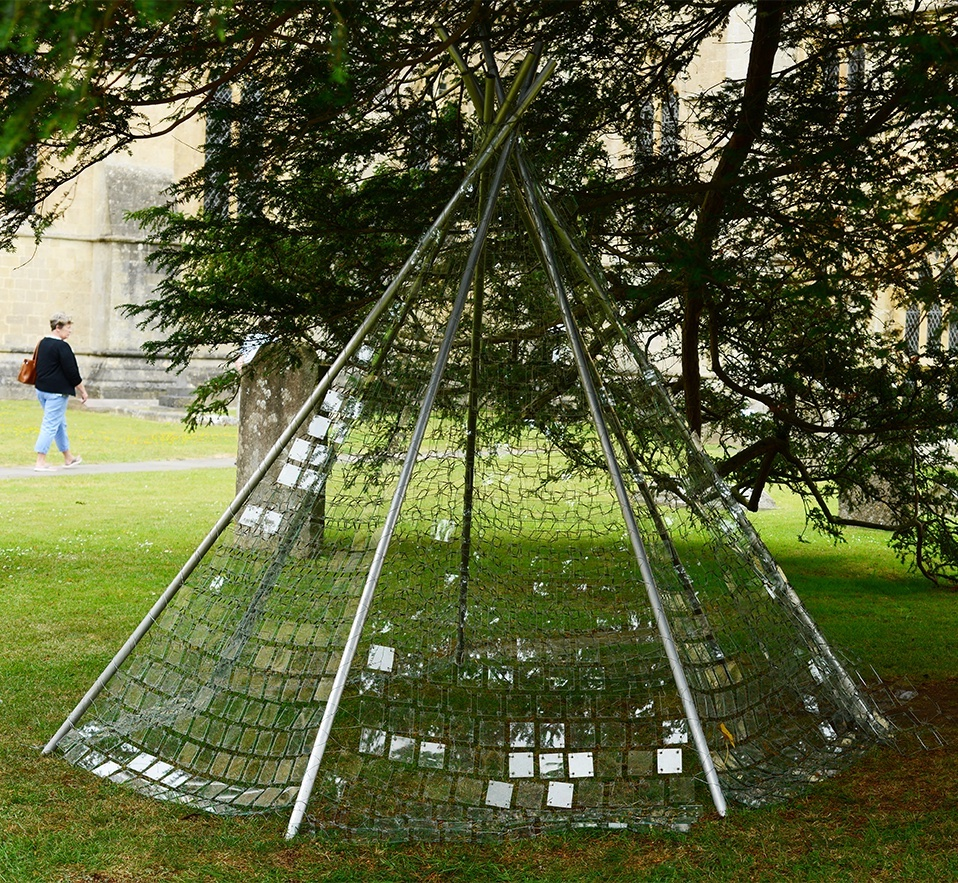
Light Sleeper, 2000

A recurring theme running through her artistic practice is that of things that have been lost, hidden, or forgotten.

Leventon was commissioned by Stour Valley Arts to make two large earthworks, which are situated in Kings Wood in Stour Valley, Kent, and form part of the Stour Valley Sculpture Trail alongside other artworks. Both pieces were shortlisted for the Rouse Kent Award for Public Art, and Ring was the winner. Made in 2004, it is a concave circular piece dug out of the land itself, inspired by Anglo-Saxon barrow fields and prehistoric earthworks found in the local area in Kent. Usually filled with water, it also acts as a water source for deer in the forest. Leventon's second work in Kings Wood made in 2004 is B52; she chose this aircraft because it was the time of the Iraq war and as such it is a powerful symbol. Her idea was to subvert the destructive and aggressive power of the aircraft into a living growing piece – it consists of a clearing in the monoculture of coppiced sweet chestnut trees cut into the negative shape of the American bomber. The cleared woodland allows light and biodiversity onto the forest floor.

From 2014 Leventon was commissioned by the Woodland Trust to make a permanent Earthwork for the Queen Elizabeth Diamond Jubilee Woods situated in Normanton le Heath, Leicestershire, UK. The form of this artwork responds to local prehistoric archaeology. Taking on the theme of time the work consists of a large corkscrew spiral structure which visitors can interact with by walking along the spiral path into the concave centre, which is surrounded by a ring of Oaks and Wild Service trees and a further ring of bushes selected to be of particular value to birds.

Responding to a commission from the Dorset-based arts organisation b-side in 2018 Leventon produced an installation Endangered Dust for the courtyard of the Portland Museum. Part of an ongoing series influenced by vernacular architecture, the form of Endangered Dust was inspired by prehistoric stone chambers cut into the rock in the Isle of Portland known as Beehive Chambers. Leventon's work was constructed from layers of hand cut plywood taking the conical beehive forms as its starting point, lit from the inside.

In 2000, she was commissioned to make a piece for the National Maritime Museum responding to the history of HMS Implacable, a Ship of the Line, of which only the salvaged stern and figurehead remained. Her piece Absentee is a ghostly re-creation of the ship made from hundreds of pieces of glass. It is now suspended in the Queens House at the side of the museum beside the Turner painting The Fighting Temeraire. It is now at the Museums storage facility at Kidbrooke pending reorganisation of some of the galleries.

== Selected exhibitions ==
UK exhibitions include:

- Altered States Open Air Sculpture Exhibition, Shaw House, Newbury, 2 August to 28 September 2025
- If Not Now, When? Generations of Women in Sculpture in Britain 1960–2023, Saatchi Gallery, London, 15 November 2023 to 22 January 2024
- In Harmony, Broomhill Sculpture Gardens, Barnstaple, 10 June 2022 to May 2024
- Contemporary Sculpture Fulmer, Bucks, open until 29 July 2023
- If Not Now, When? Generations of Women Sculptors in Britain, 1960 – 2022, The Hepworth Wakefield, West Yorkshire, 31 March - 24 September 2023
- Royal Society of Sculptors, Thirsk Hall Sculpture Garden, North Yorkshire, 3 May – 8 July 2024
- Royal Academy Summer exhibition
- Summer Exhibition, Royal Society of Sculptors, London, 2020
- Endangered Dust, Felix & Spear Gallery, London, 2020
- Trinity Buoy Wharf Drawing Prize. Orchard Place London and touring - 2022-23, 2019, 2000, 2024-25
- BLANK_, University Centre Leeds, Ripple of Light solo exhibition - 2021
- Traces of Traces, Art at Broadgate, London, 2017
- Wells Art Contemporary, Wells cathedral.Composition 2. 2019
- Lichfield Festival of Visual Art Exhibition. Lichfield Cathedral. 2019
- Endangered Dust 2019( b-side Commission), Portland Museum, Isle of Portland, Dorset, 2018
- Atrium Gallery Exchange House, Broadgate Centre, Liverpool St Station London.
- 2-person show. Angus-Hughes Gallery, London, 2017
- Centenary Open Exhibition 2013, The London Group. The Cello Factory, London, 2013
- Unfold, Nettie Horn, London, 2009
- Prospects and Interiors: Sculptors' Drawings of Inner Space, Henry Moore Institute exhibition, Sculpture Study Galleries, 2008
- Undercurrent, Fabrica, Brighton, 2004
- Excavating the Present, Kettles Yard Gallery, Cambridge, 1991
- Wake, Chisenhale Gallery, London, 1988
- Forensic Evidence, Serpentine Gallery, London, 1987

International exhibitions include:

- X-RAY. X-ray Vision in Art, Science, Film, Fashion and Architecture, UNESCO World Heritage Site Völklinger Hütte, Germany, 9 November 2025 to 9 September 2026 Catalogue: X-RAY The Power of Roentgen Vision 2026 Weltkulturerbe Volklinger Hutte. Sandstein Kultur. ISBN 978-3-95498-918-8. Pages: 15, 399, and 436 Chapter 16
- Under All is the Land, Woman Made Gallery, Chicago, 12 April to 10 May 2025
- Up the Duff, Galleria L’Affiche, Milan and La Fortezza del Girifalco, Cortona, Italy, 2017 (touring show with Leandro Lottici)
- Arte Laguna Prize, Venice, 2016
- Brandts Klaedefabrik, Odense, Denmark 1991
- Prague Festival of Contemporary Art. Czech Republic.2011
- Convergence Arts Festival, Rhode Island USA.2003
- Views (of the Museum), Museo d’Arte Contemporani Barcelona, Spain,1996
- Centraline Museum, Lodz Poland.
- Der Pfalzgalerie, KaisersLautern, Germany 1990

== Awards include ==
- 2021: Royal Society of Sculptors Spotlight Award.
- 2020: Felix & Spear Award.
- Arts Council award via The Woodland Trust, 2012-2013, for Now & Then, a large earthwork sited at the Queen Elizabeth Diamond Jubilee Woods at Normanton le Heath In Leicestershire.
- Rouse Kent Award for Public Art.
- Elephant Trust.
- British Council.
- Mark Tanner Award for Sculpture.
- Henry Moore Sculpture Trust.
- UJADF ( UK / Japan Art Design & Film ) Winner. Installation
