= The Splash =

1966 painting by David Hockney

- Artist: David Hockney
- Year: 1966
- Medium: Acrylic on canvas
- Dimensions: 180 cm × 180 cm (72 in × 72 in)
- Owner: Private collection

The Splash is a 1966 pop art painting by the British artist David Hockney. It depicts a swimming pool beside a pavilion, disturbed by a splash of water created by an unseen figure who has apparently just jumped in from a diving board. It is made in acrylic on a 72 in (180 cm) square canvas, and is titled, signed and dated 1966 on the reverse. It is one of three connected works painted in 1966 and 1967: the others are The Little Splash (1966, private collection), and A Bigger Splash (1967, Tate Britain, London).

Hockney first visited Los Angeles in 1964. Entranced by the landscape, light and lifestyle, and in particular the blue swimming pools, he moved to California in 1966.

The Splash is the second in a sequence of three paintings of similar scenes made by Hockney in late 1966 and early 1967. Hockney worked up from the small The Little Splash through the midsized The Splash, both made in Los Angeles in 1966, to the largest, A Bigger Splash, approximately 96 in (240 cm) square, made in Berkeley in 1967.

Using abstracted shapes of flat colour with sharply defined edges, at the centre of a large canvas with an unprimed border, Hockney depicts the fleeting moment just after a diver has entered the water of a swimming pool from a diving board, throwing up white spray. Hockney delighted in taking weeks to carefully paint the heavily worked spray using small brushes, freezing this dramatic detail in time, an event which had only lasted a short moment. The square format and unpainted border creates an effect like a Polaroid photograph.

The composition is based on a photograph on the front of a technical manual on swimming pool construction (Swimming Pools by Sunset Books, published in 1959) which depicts a single-storey pavilion with splayed bonnet roof, beside a pool over which projects a diving board, with two people observing the splash created by an unseen diver, amid green scenery beneath blue skies.

Hockey's series gradually simplifies and abstracts the composition, cropping the scene, and removing the people, pool furniture, scenery, and other distractions. The Little Splash and The Splash retained the bonnet-roofed pavilion, but the building became a longer, lower modernist structure with a flat roof in A Bigger Splash.

In The Splash, a beige diving board projects diagonally from the lower right corner of the painting over a deep blue pool with a white splash of water fountaining into the air, capturing the moment immediately after someone has dived in. The diver is not visible, presumably still under the water. Beside the pool is a pink patio with black margin, and some cacti in a square flower bed. The pavilion has a white wall and grey roof, with a curtain and reflections in its large sliding glass doors. Behind is some featureless green scenery, and a cloudless lighter blue sky.

The Splash has passed through a number of private galleries and art collections. It has been auctioned at Sotheby’s in London three times, first in July 1973, after which it was owned for a time by David Geffen. It was auctioned again at Sotheby's in London in June 2006, and bought for £2.9 million by a private collector, setting a (then) record price for a Hockney (the current record was set in 2018 by the $90.3 million paid for his Portrait of an Artist (Pool with Two Figures)). It was next sold in February 2020, offered by Hong Kong billionaire Joseph Lau at Sotheby's in London, to an unknown buyer for £23.1 million (US $29.9 million), then the third highest amount paid for a Hockney at auction.
