= Hockney (surname) =

Hockney is a surname. As an English name, its etymology is unknown. As an Irish name, it may be an anglicisation of Mac Fhachtna. Notable people with the surname include:

- Damian Hockney, British politician
- David Hockney (1937–2026), British painter, draughtsman, printmaker, stage designer and photographer
- Todd Hockney, character in the 1995 film The Usual Suspects played by Kevin Pollak
- Tatsuya Kimura (born 1964), also known as Hockney Katsushika, Japanese film producer and critic

== See also ==
- David Hockney: A Bigger Picture, 2012 art exhibition in Bilbao, Spain
- Hockney–Falco thesis, a controversial theory of art history proposed by David Hockney
