= Richard Weisman =

Richard L. Weisman (June 6, 1940 – December 30, 2018) was an American investment banker and art collector. He was known for his contributions to contemporary art, particularly through his patronage of Pop artist Andy Warhol. He played a key role in the creation of Warhol's Athletes series (1977), a group of ten portraits depicting prominent sports figures

Based in Seattle with connections to Los Angeles, Weisman assembled a significant collection of postwar and contemporary art. His collection drew wider attention after a group of Warhol works valued at $25 million was stolen from a Los Angeles warehouse in the early 2000s, leading to a high-profile insurance claim that he later withdrew in 2009. Following his death in 2018, Christie's auctioned selections from his collection in 2019 and 2020.

== Biography ==
Richard Lee Weisman was born on June 6, 1940, into a prominent art-collecting family. His father, Frederick R. Weisman, a Minneapolis native, helped fund the Frederick R. Weisman Museum on the University of Minnesota campus. His mother, Marcia Simon Weisman, was a major philanthropist and art collector and was one of the Founding Trustees of The Museum of Contemporary Art (MOCA), Los Angeles. She taught an arts appreciation class at the University of California, Los Angeles called "I Have a Space Over My Couch and Don't Know What to Put There." His maternal uncle was industrialist and collector Norton Simon. Raised in an environment immersed in art, he began collecting in 1961, acquiring as his first work Early Urge (1955) by Surrealist painter Roberto Matta.

Weisman befriended Pop artist Andy Warhol in New York in the 1960s. In 1977, he commissioned Athletes, a portfolio of ten 40 × 40-inch silkscreen portraits for $800,000. "I commissioned him to do this set of athletes because, generally speaking, the worlds of art and sports don't mesh that well," said Weisman. He was friendly with several athletes and selected the subjects—prominent sports figures including Muhammad Ali, Pelé, Kareem Abdul-Jabbar, Chris Evert, Dorothy Hamill, Jack Nicklaus, Tom Seaver, Willie Shoemaker, O. J. Simpson, and Vitas Gerulaitis—and Warhol photographed each using a Polaroid Big Shot camera before translating the images into his signature silkscreen style. Warhol produced eight complete sets of the series, and Weisman retained one set.

Weisman developed close relationships with major 20th-century artists, including James Rosenquist, Peter Beard, Roy Lichtenstein, Barnett Newman, Robert Rauschenberg, and Jean-Michel Basquiat, and was known for hosting gatherings that brought together figures from the art world, sports, and entertainment.

His collection was noted for its breadth, with strong holdings in Pop art, American illustration, and sculpture. It included works by artists such as Tom Wesselmann and Alberto Giacometti, as well as illustrators including Norman Rockwell, George Hughes, Gil Elvgren, and Kurt Ard. In 2003, Weisman published a book about his collection called From Picasso to Pop.

In May 2009, Weisman collaborated with Urban Compass and Pharmaka for an exhibition that brought together works by Warhol and students from a Watts elementary school. Inspired by Warhol's Athletes series, the students created self-portraits using brightly colored paint applied to photographs in imitation of Warhol's silkscreen style. While the Warhol works were not offered for sale, proceeds from the sale of the students' artworks, priced between $15 and $100, benefited Urban Compass and Pharmaka's educational and community programs.

In September 2009, a complete set of Warhol's Athletes portraits was stolen from Weisman's Los Angeles home under unclear circumstances, with no signs of forced entry and other works left untouched. A $1 million reward was initially offered for their return. Weisman subsequently withdrew both the $25 million insurance claim and the reward offer a month later. He cited difficulties with insurance investigators, stating that the process would be lengthy and intrusive.

Weisman died on December 30, 2018. Following his death, Christie's presented selections from his collection in a series of New York sales in 2019 and 2020. His collection included 88 works spanning Post-War and Contemporary Art, American Art, Latin American Art, Modern British Art and Photographs, as well as Picasso ceramics.
