= Larry Stanton =

American artist

- Born: June 21, 1947
- Died: October 18, 1984 (aged 37); New York City
- Education: Cooper Union, Art Center College of Design
- Known for: Painting, drawing, writing

Larry Stanton (June 21, 1947 – October 18, 1984) was a Manhattan-based portrait artist whose work was championed by David Hockney, Henry Geldzahler, Ellsworth Kelly and others. He was a gay man who lived in Greenwich Village in New York City.

== Formal training ==
In 1965, Stanton moved from upstate New York to New York City. He attended Cooper Union for one semester in 1966, then in 1967 he moved to Los Angeles to live with Arthur Lambert. In 1968, he attended Art Center College of Design for a year, where he studied painting and drawing. The same year Stanton was introduced to the English painter David Hockney, and they remained friends. In 1969 he received a scholarship at the New School of Social Research to study printmaking. A show at New York City's Gotham Gallery followed in 1970.

== Breakdown ==
In 1979, the death of Stanton's mother from cancer, combined with increasing alcohol addiction, resulted in a breakdown for which he had to be hospitalized. By 1981, he fully recovered and found a new passion for painting. The faces of his family, friends and the young men he met became the primary focus of his work.

== Death ==
Stanton died of AIDS-related complications in 1984.

== Exhibitions, media, and retrospectives ==
Stanton appeared briefly in the 1973 biographical documentary about David Hockney, A Bigger Splash.

In 1983, he had a show at the Holly Solomon Gallery in New York City. In 1984 he showed at the Aaron Berman Gallery, at PS 1 and at the Magic Gallery in New York City. After he died, his collected works were shown at the Charles Cowles Gallery in NYC in 1987. The Daniel Cooney Fine Art gallery in Chelsea, New York, exhibits "It Doesn't Thunder Every Day", May through July 2021, featuring 20 works on paper in colored pencil and pastel that capture the face of a lost generation just as the AIDS epidemic was in its early stages.

Stanton is the subject of Roland Tec's biopic "Thunder Every Day" (Pinkplot Productions).

Stanton's work is in the permanent collection of the Leslie-Lohman Museum of Gay and Lesbian Art in New York City.

A new monograph of Stanton's life and work was published by Apartmento magazine in 2022 edited by Fabio Cherstich and Arthur Lambert titled 'Think of me When it Thunders'.

In 2022, Acne Studios launched a small collection of articles and housewares titled "Acne Loves Larry Stanton" based on Stanton's works.
