= Wajid Khan (artist) =

Indian artist and sculptor based in Indore, Madhya Pradesh

- Born: 10 March 1981; Madhya Pradesh, India
- Occupations: Artist, Sculptor
- Known for: Contributions to nail art, kinetic installations
- Awards: Guinness World Record (2017); Limca Book of Records

Wajid Khan is an Indian artist and sculptor based in Indore, Madhya Pradesh. He is known for creating contemporary artworks using materials such as iron nails, bullets, metal, stones, and automotive parts. Khan's notable works include nail portraits of figures like Mahatma Gandhi, Dhirubhai Ambani, Mother Mary and Jesus, as well as kinetic art and installations that address various social issues.

In 2017, he set a Guinness World Record for the largest nail sculpture and is featured in the Limca Book of Records for his nail art. His artworks are part of collections at Rashtrapati Bhavan and Bharat Bhavan. He appeared on the television show OMG! Yeh Mera India on History TV18 in 2019.

== Early life and background ==
He was born to Abdul Wahid and Roshan Ara, hailing from Songari, a village in Mandsaur, Madhya Pradesh. He did not receive formal training in the arts. Before pursuing a career in art, he worked in various jobs, including at a welding shop and as a taxi driver. He is married to Maryam Siddiqui, who is also an artist.

== Work ==
His early works include a portrait of Mahatma Gandhi made from iron nails, taking three years to complete. He has also created portraits of figures like Dhirubhai Ambani, Jesus, Mary, Sai Baba, and Mohammed bin Rashid Al Maktoum using the same technique.

In 2013, he created a monumental wall installation titled Champa, depicting a horse and a jockey. The artwork was constructed using spare parts from various automobiles and took over eight months to complete.

In 2014, Khan created an installation work depicting a crying girl child made from medical equipment associated with sex-selective abortion. This piece was part of Save the girl child campaign.

Wajid Khan also created a portrait of Sri Lankan architect Geoffrey Bawa using stones of various sizes and shapes. The stones were arranged on a metal sheet, secured with glue. The process involved the use of tools such as tongs and tweezers to form an outline of Bawa's face.

In 2016, Wajid Khan produced a series of artworks using spoons and forks to depict various life stages, including maternal themes, dance, and birds. His spoon art employs everyday utensils as mediums for artistic expression.

In 2018, Khan created a 2.5-foot by 2.5-foot installation of Vallabhbhai Patel using parts from a car and motorcycle engine, forming a portrait of Sardar Patel through shadow art techniques. This piece was installed at Bharat Bhavan, a public multi-arts museum in Bhopal. Later that year, he was commissioned to create a 170-foot statue of Swami Vivekananda from a combination of eight metals, which was reported to be the tallest statue of Swami Vivekanand in India.

On 2 October 2019, marking Mahatma Gandhi's 150th birth anniversary, Wajid Khan collaborated with the Plastic Donation Center to create a human mosaic of Gandhi at TT Nagar Stadium, Bhopal. The artwork, involving the participation of 6,000 schoolchildren, was designed to raise awareness about plastic pollution. The event was attended by officials, including Jitendra Patwari, Cabinet Minister for Higher Education, and Alok Sharma, Mayor of Bhopal.

Khan made a 12×8 feet portrait of poet Ghalib using wine glasses, bottles, and jugs, which was showcased at the Urdu literary festival Jashn-e-Rekhta in December 2019. In 2020, he created a 40-foot hydra-like kinetic art installation made of 300 steel bowls that locked and unlocked with the wind. The artwork depicts India's societal unity, where the removal of a single bowl disrupts the balance. The installation was exhibited at the Namaste Orchha Festival, organized by the Madhya Pradesh Tourism Board, in March 2020.

In May 2020, during the COVID-19 pandemic, Wajid Khan created a large-scale stone artwork honoring frontline workers, featuring a tribute to police officer Devendra Chandravanshi, who died from the virus. The piece included messages of gratitude in multiple languages.

== Exhibitions and collections ==
Khan's works have been displayed in various museums, art festivals, and galleries. In June 2014, an exhibition featuring Khan's artworks created with iron nails was held in Indore, followed by another exhibition in February 2014 in Mumbai. In March 2016, his artwork was exhibited at Rashtrapati Bhavan during the Festival of Innovation (FOIN), organized by the National Innovation Foundation, Ministry of Science and Technology.

His installations were showcased at the India Art Festival in January 2017, held at Thyagaraj Stadium in Delhi. Subsequently, he exhibited his artwork at Jashn-e-Rekhta in 2019 and displayed kinetic installation at the Namaste Orchha festival in March 2020.

Khan's works are included in the permanent collection of Rashtrapati Bhavan, the official residence of the President of India, and the Bharat Bhavan Museum.

== Public speaking ==
In 2017, Wajid Khan delivered two TEDx talks: "Art Inspirations from Life" in Pune in July, and "Making Everything Out of Nothing" at Indian Institute of Management Rohtak in September. He later gave another TEDx talk at Rajiv Gandhi Proudyogiki Vishwavidyalaya, Bhopal in August 2019. He has delivered guest lectures and talks at various academic institutions, including the Indian Institute of Management Indore, Aligarh Muslim University, and Lovely Professional University.

== Honours and records ==
Wajid Khan was listed in the Limca Book of Records under the category 'Most nails used in a portrait' for creating a portrait of Mahatma Gandhi using 150,000 nails. In December 2017, he was named in the Guinness World Records for creating the largest nail sculpture, a 3D peace symbol made from 14,992 nails.

== Media ==
In 2019, Wajid Khan's life and work were featured in Season 3 of the television infotainment show OMG! Yeh Mera India on History TV18, hosted by Krushna Abhishek. The episode was later made available for streaming on Amazon Prime Video. In 2018, a film about his life was announced, focusing on his struggles and successes, with filming locations set in Indore and Mandsaur, directed by Sohini Mukherjee.

== See also ==
- Marcus Levine
- Günther Uecker
