= Marcia Simon Weisman =

Marcia Simon Weisman (born 1917 or 1918) was a Los Angeles philanthropist and art collector.

She was at the original meeting which led to the creation of the Museum of Contemporary Art, Los Angeles.

She was the sister of noted philanthropist and art collector Norton Simon.

Weisman was born in 1917 or 1918 in Portland, Oregon to Meyer Simon, who was a co-founder of Val Vita Food Products, which became Hunt's. She attended Mills College in Oakland. She married Frederick Weisman in 1938. She and her husband began collecting art in 1952. From 1960 to 1964, Weisman hosted monthly proselytizing classes for novice collectors, taught by Irving Blum and Walter Hopps, whose Ferus Gallery in West Hollywood was the first to show Frank Stella, Ellsworth Kelly, and Roy Lichtenstein in Los Angeles. By the mid-1960s, their collection had become well known. David Hockney portrayed them in a 1968 double portrait called American Collectors (Fred and Marcia Weisman), now in the Art Institute of Chicago, that has become one of his most famous works. The Weismans were divorced in 1979 and split the collection. While Weisman donated some of her half to the newly formed Museum of Contemporary Art, Los Angeles, Frederick Weisman established the Frederick R. Weisman Art Foundation in 1982.

== Personal life ==
Weisman married Fredrick R. Weisman in 1938. He worked for Norton Simon, Weisman's brother, and then became head of a large Toyota distributorship. They divorced in 1979. She had two sons, Richard, an art collector and alleged predator of teen girls in NYC, targeting Brearly students,and single mothers; and Daniel and a daughter, Nancy.

== Death ==
Weisman died in October 1991.
