= Peter Getting Out of Nick's Pool =

1966 painting by David Hockney

- Artist: David Hockney
- Year: 1966
- Medium: Acrylic on canvas
- Dimensions: 152 cm × 152 cm (60 in × 60 in)
- Location: Walker Art Gallery, Liverpool

Peter Getting Out of Nick's Pool is a 1966 acrylic-on-canvas painting by the British pop art artist David Hockney. It depicts the rear view of a naked man climbing out of a swimming pool outside a contemporary house. It is held at the Walker Art Gallery, in Liverpool.

== Background ==
Hockney moved from England to California in 1964, drawn by its sleek modernist aesthetic and warm Mediterranean climate. In 1966, while teaching at UCLA, Hockney met the American art student Peter Schlesinger. The two became lovers, and Hockney started painting a series of pool pictures, often featuring Schlesinger. A few of these, such as Peter Getting Out of Nick's Pool (1966), A Bigger Splash (1967) and Portrait of an Artist (Pool with Two Figures) (1972), later achieved iconic status. On 15 November 2018, the latter set a world record for the most expensive work of art ever sold at auction by a living artist.

== Description ==
The painting measures 152 cm × 152 cm (60 in × 60 in). It depicts the communal pool of the apartment block at 1145 Larrabee Street, Hollywood, north of Sunset Boulevard, which was then the home of art dealer Nicholas Wilder, and shows a naked Schlesinger, then 18 years old, climbing up and out of the pool. Hockney, in his characteristic style, simplifies and flattens the image, and the rippling surface of the water is abstracted into wavy white lines on blue, similar to a comic or an advertisement. The straight lines in the painting were created using masking tape. The work has a border of un-primed canvas, like a photograph, which Hockney says he left "to make the picture look more like a painting".

== Creation ==
The figure in the painting is based on a Polaroid photograph Hockney took of Schlesinger standing up against the hood of his own MG car. Interviewed about the painting in 2012, Schlesinger laughed about it, saying "That's why the part under the water isn't painted well—because it was just invented."

== Provenance ==
In 1967, Hockney's painting won the John Moores Painting Prize at the Walker Art Gallery in Liverpool. The painting was acquired as a bequest from Sir John Moores who in 1957, established the eponymous biannual award and subsequently often purchased the winning entry and then presented the work to the museum. Moores purchased this work in 1967, and presented it to the museum in 1968. The picture remains in the Walker's permanent collection.
