= Bigger Trees Near Warter =

Painting by David Hockney

Coordinates: 53.9399556°N 0.6383314°W

- Artist: David Hockney
- Year: 2007
- Type: Oil, canvas
- Dimensions: 460 cm × 1220 cm (180 in × 480 in)
- Location: Tate Britain, London

Bigger Trees Near Warter or ou Peinture en Plein Air pour l'age Post-Photographique is a large landscape painting by British artist David Hockney. Measuring 460 by 1,220 centimetres or 180 by 480 inches, it depicts a coppice near Warter, Pocklington in the East Riding of Yorkshire and is the largest painting Hockney ever completed.

It was painted in the East Riding of Yorkshire between February and March 2007. The painting's alternative title alludes to the technique Hockney used to create the work, a combination of painting out of doors and in front of the subject (called in French 'sur le motif') whilst also using the techniques of digital photography.

== Subject ==
The painting, a landscape near the village of Warter, between Bridlington and York, is set just before the arrival of spring when trees are coming into leaf. The painting is dominated by a large sycamore which features in 30 of the 50 panels. In the shallow foreground space a copse of tall trees and some daffodils stand on slightly raised ground. Another, denser copse is visible in the background. A road to the extreme left and two buildings to the right and rear of the composition offer signs of human habitation. Much of the painting's extensive upper half is devoted to the intricate pattern of overlapping branches, clearly delineated against a pale winter sky.

== Background ==
Although Hockney has lived in Los Angeles since 1978, he always returned to spend Christmas at his mother's house in Bridlington. From 2004 onwards he spent increasing lengths of time in Yorkshire; the rolling chalk hills around Bridlington became the focus of his art. In 2006 he made a series of nine large landscapes of Woldgate Woods, returning to the same spot between March and November to chart the changing seasons. Each of these works consisted of up to six panels.

On a trip to Los Angeles in February 2007, looking at images of his Woldgate Woods paintings, Hockney had the idea of working up the same scene over a much bigger scale. He had to work out how to complete this project without a ladder and in the small space of his studio in Bridlington. "The enormous 19th-century oil paintings like The Coronation of Napoleon in the Louvre were made in specially designed studios." Because of space considerations, Hockney had to avoid working on a ladder or on scaffolding: "The trouble is that with something like this you need to step back. Artists have been killed stepping back from ladders."

"Then I realised it was possible to make a single picture that size," he says, "using computer technology to help you see what you are doing. I thought, my God, it would be enormous, but that it would be good on the end wall of the largest gallery at the Royal Academy. I'd found a way to do an eye-catching landscape for the Summer Exhibition. It was quite a challenge."

Only six weeks after his idea in Los Angeles, the painting was completed. The first three weeks were spent organising the project, "The logistics were quite something." His usual procedure when working in the landscape is to load a pickup truck with paints and materials and drive to the location. In addition, a special rack had to be constructed capable of storing 50 wet canvases.

The painting itself was essentially completed in a three-week period in March 2007. "The painting had to be done in one go. Once I started, I had to carry on until it was finished," says Hockney. "The deadline wasn't the Royal Academy. The deadline was the arrival of spring, which changes things. The motif is one thing in winter, but in summer it's one solid mass of foliage – so you can't see inside and it's not as interesting to me." The solution was to sketch a grid showing how the scene would fit together over 50 panels. Each individual panel was painted in situ and as they were completed his assistant, Jean-Pierre Gonçalves de Lima, would digitally photograph them and then make them into a computer mosaic. With this mosaic he could chart his progress, since he could have only six panels on the wall at any one time. Gradually, with the help of the constantly updated computer mosaic, Hockney built up the picture.

Hockney also spent time just looking at the subject he was going to paint. "I'd sit there for three hours at a time just looking, lying down practically so I looked up."

== Showing ==
Hockney produced Bigger Trees Near Warter for the Royal Academy summer exhibition in London, where it was first shown in May 2007, occupying the end wall of Gallery III. Following the close of the exhibition, once the rest of the works had been removed this painting remained in place. Two digital photographic renderings of the work on exactly the same scale as the original were then hung on the two walls flanking it.

From 12 February 2011 to 12 June 2011, the painting was on display at York Art Gallery. Then from 25 June 2011 to 18 September 2011, it was on display at the Ferens Art Gallery in Hull.

From 1 October 2011 to 4 March 2012, the painting was on display at the Cartwright Hall Art Gallery in Bradford, the artist's birthplace.

== Donation ==
In April 2008 Hockney donated the painting to the Tate, saying, "I thought if I'm going to give something to the Tate I want to give them something really good. It's going to be here for a while. I don't want to give things I'm not too proud of." He also said, "I feel loyal to the Tate. More artists should donate. They should think about it. You can’t quite trust collectors who say they’ll give to the Tate and often don’t." The Tate's director, Nicholas Serota, said, "It is an astonishing gift. Notwithstanding its size, this painting could have been sold to many buyers around the world. Simply to give with no tax benefit to himself is a remarkable gesture."

The painting found a permanent home at Tate Britain in November 2009, where it was displayed along with a pair of digital renderings of the painting.

The copse can be found approximately 3/4 mile south of Warter. A group of trees near Warter which had been painted by Hockney was cut down in March 2009, but these were not the trees in the painting described in this article.
