= Portrait of an Artist (Pool with Two Figures) =

Large acrylic painting by David Hockney

- Artist: David Hockney
- Year: 1972
- Medium: Acrylic on canvas
- Movement: Pop art
- Dimensions: 213.5 cm × 305 cm (84.1 in × 120 in)
- Location: Private collection

Portrait of an Artist (Pool with Two Figures) is a large acrylic-on-canvas pop art painting by British artist David Hockney, completed in May 1972. It measures 7 ft × 10 ft (2.1 m × 3.0 m), and depicts two figures: one swimming underwater and one clothed male figure looking down at the swimmer. In November 2018, it sold for $90.3 million, at that time the highest price ever paid at auction for a painting by a living artist.

== Background ==
Hockney visited California for the first time in January 1964 after a successful first solo exhibition at the John Kasmin gallery. The United States fascinated him, and Los Angeles in particular, partly because of the influence of Hollywood cinema but also because of the modernist building Case Study House #21. As a gay man, he was also a fan of the beefcake magazine Physique Pictorial, which was published in Los Angeles. "I instinctively knew I was going to like it," Hockney said, "and as I flew over San Bernardino and saw the swimming pools and the houses and everything and the sun, I was more thrilled than I have ever been in arriving in any city."

Hockney painted the first of his pool paintings, California Art Collector in 1964, and the swimming pool became a recurring theme in his paintings, such as Peter Getting Out of Nick's Pool (1966, Walker Art Gallery, Liverpool) and most notably A Bigger Splash (1967, Tate Gallery). He painted a series of double portraits from 1968 to 1977, including American Collectors (Fred and Marcia Weisman) (1968, Art Institute of Chicago), and Mr and Mrs Clark and Percy (1971, Tate Gallery).

== Composition ==
This work brings together two of Hockney's themes from his paintings of the late 1960s and early 1970s: the swimming pool, and the double portrait. It depicts a male figure in white trunks swimming underwater, and the painter Peter Schlesinger, Hockney's former lover and muse, fully clothed and standing at the edge of the pool looking down at the swimmer. The painting is set in southern France, near Saint-Tropez. In characteristic Hockney style, the foreground is simplified and flattened with a view of tree-clad hills in the background.

The composition was inspired by a serendipitous combination of photographs that Hockney noticed on his studio floor: one of a man swimming underwater, taken in California in 1966, and the other of a man standing looking at the ground. Juxtaposed, it appeared as if the standing person were looking at the swimmer. Hockney's relationship with Schlesinger had ended abruptly in 1971, following a fight in Cadaqués. "By showing another young man swimming towards Peter, the artist acknowledges lost love and his boyfriend’s desire for a new partner". The painting can be viewed as fitting into a European tradition since the Renaissance of depicting the nude bathing, washing off the stain of pollution amid the peace of nature.

Hockney worked on the painting for four months in late 1971, but dissatisfied with the composition, in particular with the angle of the pool, abandoned the work and started afresh. He then travelled for several months with Mark Lancaster, and returned to the work in early 1972. The year 1972 was a very productive year for Hockney, as he threw himself into his work to escape from his unhappiness, often working 14 or 15 hours a day. Around the same time, he was working on his (unfinished) double portrait of George Lawson and Wayne Sleep (1972-5, Tate).

In April 1972, Hockney flew to the south of France to better visualise the figure swimming underwater, using the pool at film director Tony Richardson's villa at Le Nid du Duc near Saint-Tropez to do so. Hockney's studio assistant, Mo McDermott, recreated the pose of the downcast man, while a young photographer, John St Clair, was the swimmer. Hockney took hundreds of photographs based on his original composition.

Back at his London studio, Hockney assembled the photos along with photographs of Peter Schlesinger taken in Kensington Gardens wearing the same pink jacket. Hockney worked on the painting for two weeks, working 18-hour days, completing and varnishing it only the night before it was due to be shipped to New York for the exhibition at André Emmerich Gallery. It was first shown in the exhibition Paintings and Drawings, which ran from 13 to 31 May 1972.

Hockney said of the painting, "I must admit I loved working on that picture, [...] working with such intensity; it was marvellous doing it, really thrilling"

The creation of the painting and the breakdown of Hockney's relationship with Schlesinger were featured in the semi-fictional 1974 documentary A Bigger Splash, named after the 1967 Hockney painting.

The swimming pool was a recurring motif in Hockney’s work of the 1960s and 1970s, inspired by his first impressions of Los Angeles, where pools were widespread in contrast to their rarity in England. Hockney also frequently explored the California landscape in his work, showing the region’s environment and lifestyle.

== Sale history ==
The painting was originally sold to James Colonsay Langhorne Astor and his wife in 1972 for $18,000 (equivalent to $139,000 in 2025). It was acquired in 1983 by the American billionaire David Geffen, who sold it to British billionaire Joe Lewis in 1995 at an undisclosed price.

It was included in the Hockney exhibition, which toured the Tate Gallery, the Metropolitan Museum of Art and the Centre Pompidou from February 2017 to February 2018.

On 15 November 2018, in nine minutes of bidding, it was sold to an unknown buyer for $90.3 million at Christie's auction house in New York City, setting an auction record for a living artist. The sale broke the previous record for a living artist of $58 million for Jeff Koons' Balloon Dog (Orange) in 2013 and more than tripled the record for a work by Hockney, $28.5 million for Pacific Coast Highway and Santa Monica set in May 2018. The highest known prices for a painting by a living artist in private sales are for two paintings by Jasper Johns (born 1930): in 2006, Kenneth C. Griffin bought Johns' False Start for about $80 million ($128 million in 2025) from David Geffen, and in 2010 Steve Cohen bought Johns' 1958 Flag for around $110 million (equivalent to $162 million in 2025) from Leo Castelli's son.

The buyer was later revealed to be Taiwanese billionaire Pierre Chen.

== Pop culture influence ==
- In the American adult animated television series BoJack Horseman a painting in Bojack's house is based on Portrait of an Artist (Pool with Two Figures).
- The cover art of the Mr. Oizo album Stade 2, by the artist So Me, is a deconstructed reinterpretation of Portrait of an Artist (Pool with Two Figures).
- In the 2026 Grand Theft Auto Online update "The Next Big Score," players have the possibility to steal a reinterpretation of the famous painting.

== See also ==
- List of most expensive paintings
