= A Walk Around the Hotel Courtyard, Acatlan =

1985 painting by David Hockney

A Walk Around the Hotel Courtyard, Acatlán
- Artist: David Hockney
- Year: 1985
- Medium: oil on canvas
- Movement: Pop art
- Dimensions: 183 cm × 610 cm (72 in × 240 in)
- Location: Private collection

A Walk Around the Hotel Courtyard, Acatlán is an oil on canvas painting by the British artist David Hockney, from 1985.

Hockney painted A Walk Around the Hotel Courtyard after discovering a hotel courtyard in Acatlán, Puebla, Mexico, when car trouble forced him to stop on the way while driving to Mexico City. The painting is one of his more hotly coloured works, being mostly red, with green and yellow, and is done in reverse perspective.

The oil on two canvases or a diptych measures 183 by 610 centimeters overall. It is owned by the Benesse Corporation and is on display at Benesse House and Art Site, a contemporary art museum and hotel at the art village of Naoshima, Japan.

== The studies ==
The courtyard inspired a set of drawings, later a series of lithographs and finally the painting. In these works, at first the perspective is conventional, and concentrates on the central well, observing points of view from walking the courtyard. The lithograph, Hotel Acatlán Two Weeks Later shows almost all the characteristics of the final work.

== The painting ==
In the painting the detail of the columns is gone, the painter has vanished, but the viewer is presented with a space where distance is abolished. There is cubism, “scientific” objectivity is gone, and plurality of space is emphasized. Reverse perspective is used to produce an all-seeing experience leading to a visionary feeling. Like a frame around paintings which decorate an altar, it seems to amalgamate real space with the world of the miracle.

In his review of the show, Espace/Paysage, Galerie Sud, Centre Georges Pompidou, in Paris, Joe Lockard observed that the space of the landscape in Hockney’s other paintings is successfully extended to an interior. He says, “Hockney attempts and achieves panoramic interior compositions that distinguish his vivid experimentalism.”

The painting followed Hockney’s Mexican exhibition, Hockney Paints the Stage in 1984.
