= American Collectors (Fred and Marcia Weisman) =

1968 painting by David Hockney

- Artist: David Hockney
- Year: 1968
- Medium: Acrylic on canvas
- Dimensions: 213.4 cm × 304.8 cm (84.0 in × 120.0 in)
- Location: Art Institute of Chicago; Chicago
- Accession: 1984

American Collectors (Fred and Marcia Weisman) is a 1968 painting by British artist David Hockney. The painting is currently in the collection of the Art Institute of Chicago. It was accessioned by the museum in 1984 after being donated by Frederic G. Pick and his wife, Frances Weis Pick. The painting depicts Frederick and Marcia Weisman, two American art collectors from Los Angeles.

The piece has been displayed at the National Portrait Gallery and the Royal Society of the Arts.

Hockney's 1968 double portrait of Fred and Marcia Weisman, American Collectors, is an intimate replication of the pair at their residence in California. Hockney uses the subjects, the objects, and his own style to recreate a mundane scene that invites both strangers and friends of the couple to ponder their dualistic home that stands as both a residence and gallery.

== Context ==
David Hockney is a British artist who at the time had also made a name for himself in America. In 1964, he visited Los Angeles and then left quickly only to come back in 1966 to teach at the University of California Los Angeles. Two years later Hockney began his double portraits. Initial thoughts on the painting were that it favored a dramatic and domestic scene, set out on a stage where both subjects and objects play the same role. Some critics argue that his work has no social context; however, his art does reflect a very high-class California domesticity during the 1960s when parts of California were experiencing upheaval such as the riots in Watts. A predominantly black neighborhood broke out into a riot that lasted several days and more than 3,000 people were arrested. Despite his themes that ignored contemporary social upheavals, his art is continuously praised by critics. In 2018, his painting Portrait of an Artist (Pool with Two Figures) sold on auction for 90.3 million dollars setting a record for a living artist.
