= David Hockney: A Bigger Picture =

2012 art exhibition

David Hockney: A Bigger Picture (Spanish: David Hockney: Una Visión Más Amplia; Basque: David Hockney: Ikuspegi Zabalago Bat) was an exhibition at the Guggenheim Museum Bilbao from 15 May to 30 September 2012 of recent work of the English painter David Hockney. Consisting of paintings, collages and electronically produced art, the show took as its subject matter the East Riding of Yorkshire landscape.

The exhibition in Bilbao came after a successful run earlier in the year at the Royal Academy of Arts, a London institution that collaborated with the Guggenheim to present the show. The Bilbao show was one of the most popular ever held at the museum, drawing over 296,000 visitors; it also received generally favorable reviews from both critics and visitors.

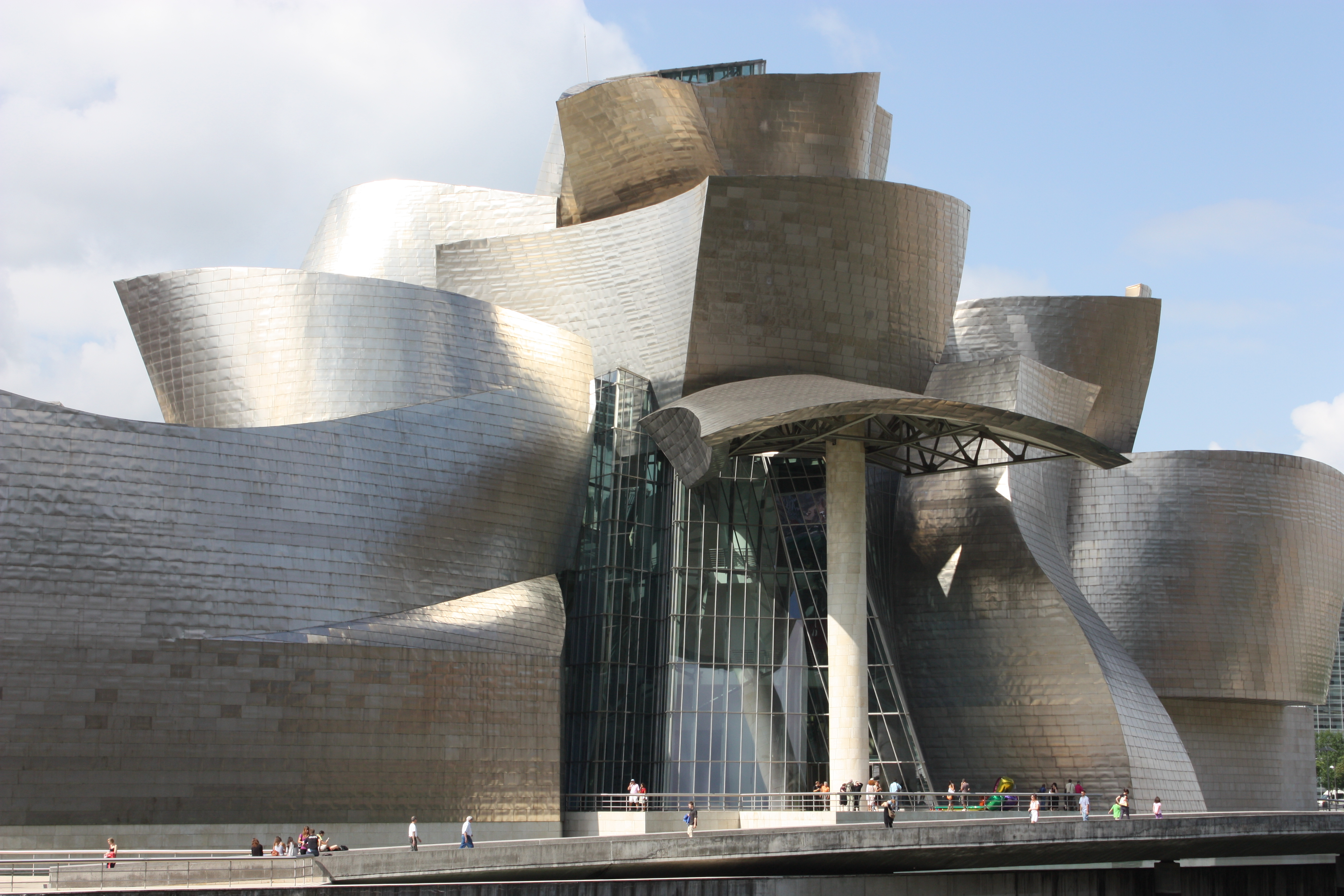
Guggenheim Museum Bilbao

== Background ==
Since 1960, David Hockney has been making Pop-primitive paintings. They are considered whimsical and anti-nostalgic. As artistic trends favored at turns more conceptual or abstract work, Hockney steadfastly continued pursuing his interest in representational landscapes, albeit with a twist. He combined Cubism and cartooning, art historical tradition and the latest Apple product, employing the artistic canon like a box of crayons to be mixed and matched at will.

The title of the show is inspired by an iconic Hockney work, 1967's A Bigger Splash.

== Works ==
One of the works displayed, the 60 canvas A Bigger Grand Canyon (1998)

In 2007 the Royal Academy of Arts in London and the Guggenheim Museum Bilbao stated they had no desire to do a retrospective of Hockney’s works instead, focussing on his current work around his return to the UK, specifically his native Yorkshire, after a long stay in California. The exhibit included oil paintings, charcoal drawings, sketches, digital videos and iPad paintings mostly concerning landscapes depicting Yorkshire.

=== Oil paintings ===
The exhibit focused on natural development throughout the year. This was especially noted in the masterpiece, Spring’s Arrival in Wold Gate; an oversize work composed of 32 canvases showing a road amongst trees. It is noted for Hockney's polychromatic style expressed in the diversity of colours.

=== iPad paintings ===
51 paintings made and shown on iPads were displayed showing the transition from winter to summer on Woldgate in the East Riding of Yorkshire - the iPad series is called 'The Arrival of Spring in Woldgate'. Using the app Brushes the artist replaced the traditional sketchbook with the digital medium.

=== Collages ===
In addition to iPad Paintings, David Hockney also did collages to add more detail to them.

== Related activities ==
During the exhibition there were some related activities organized by the museum; these included a conference on the East Riding of Yorkshire’s landscapes and a workshop on painting with the iPad. The conference was delivered by Edith Devaney, exhibition's commissioner, and explained and analyzed the main aspects of the displayed works. Devaney lectured on Hockney's work with new technologies, especially the iPad.

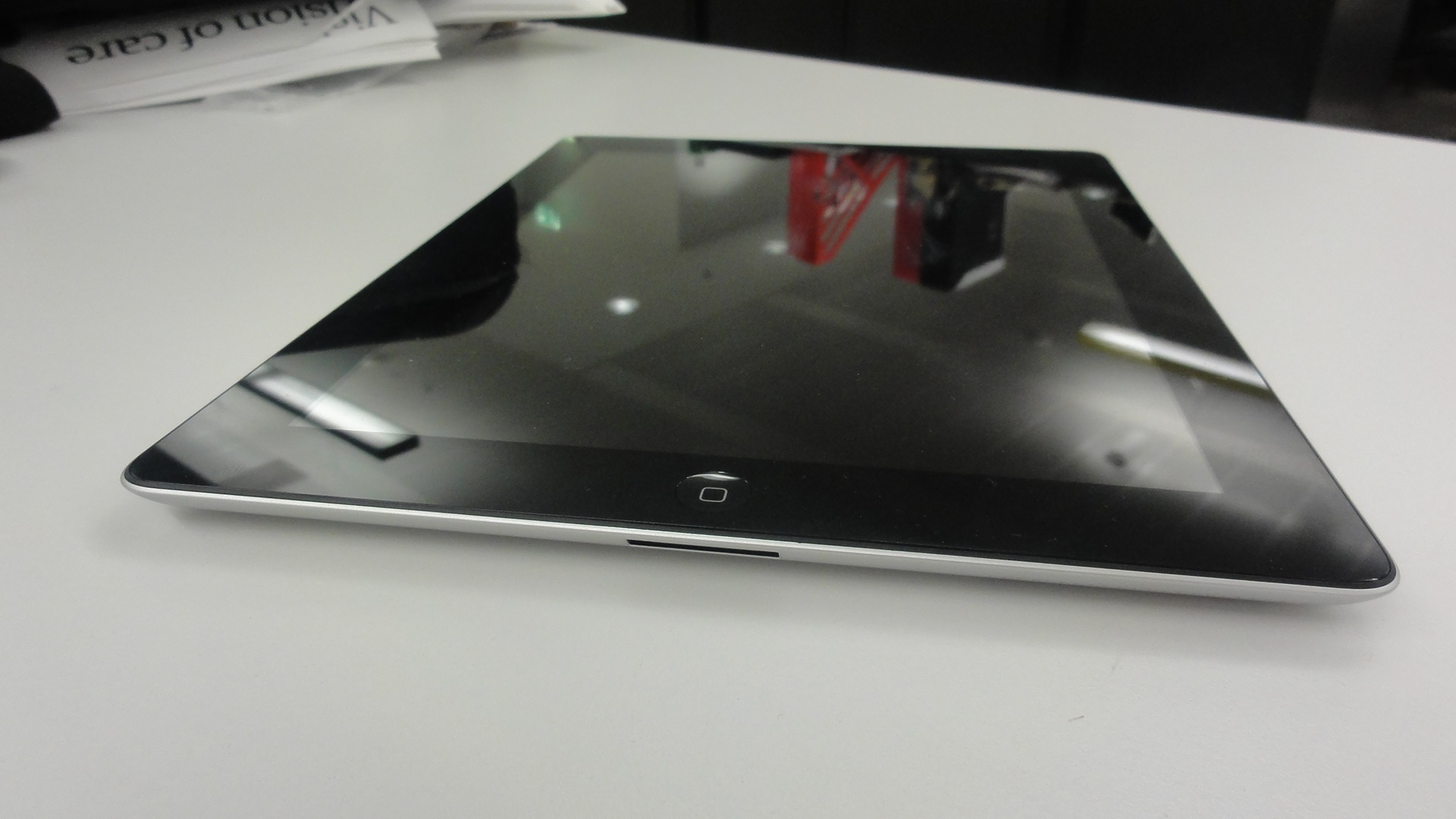
All conference participants were required to bring their own iPad

The workshop, led by Óscar Ciencia, showed how to work with an iPad, for artistic creation and graphic entertainment.

== Reception ==
The exhibition was one of the most popular in Spain in the summer of 2012. It listed first in El Mundo’s list of 12 exhibitions to see that season. On 29 December 2012 when El País released their annual top ten exhibitions of the year, an important index in the Spanish art world, they listed it second only to Edward Hopper’s exhibition the same summer at the Thyssen-Bornemisza Museum.

In an Evening Standard review, Brian Sewell concluded that Hockney had made a mistake focusing on painting in his later career:

There was a time in the 1970s when I thought him one of the best draughtsmen of the 20th century, wonderfully skilful, observant, subtle, sympathetic, spare, every touch of pencil, pen or crayon essential to the evocation of the subject, whether it be a portrait or light flooding a sparse room; nothing has made me change that view, but Hockney has tried very hard...Hockney is not another Turner expressing, in high seriousness, his debt to the old master; Hockney is not another Picasso teasing Velázquez and Delacroix with not quite enough wit; here Hockney is a vulgar prankster, trivialising not only a painting that he is incapable of understanding and could never execute but in involving him in the various parodies, demeaning Picasso too.

== See also ==
- David Hockney exhibitions
- Guggenheim Museum Bilbao
- Royal Academy of Arts
