= Woldgate =

Minor road in the East Riding of Yorkshire, England

Coordinates: 54.0816°N 0.2937°W

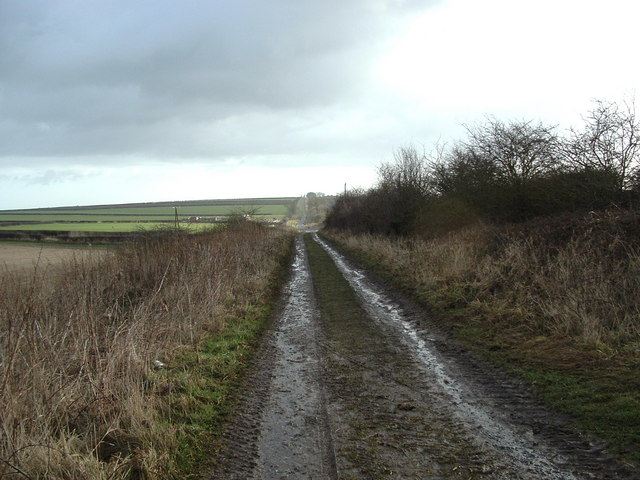
Woldgate near Kilham

Woldgate is a minor road in the East Riding of Yorkshire, England, which follows the line of a Roman road. It runs for a distance of 10 miles (16 km) from a junction with the A165 on the western edge of Bridlington, through the village of Kilham, to a junction with the B1249 4 miles (6 km) north of Driffield. For most of its length Woldgate follows a low ridge of the Yorkshire Wolds, with extensive views to north and south.

The Roman road ran from the coast at Bridlington to York. Its line can be traced west from the western end of Woldgate along a series of bridleways and minor roads, and then a stretch of the A166, to Stamford Bridge, where it crossed the River Derwent by a ford.

Woldgate was the subject of a series of landscapes created in 2006 by the artist David Hockney. Woldgate Woods, near Boynton, were also photographed by Hockney.

National Cycle Route 1 follows the eastern part of Woldgate.
