= M. A. Alford =

American multimedia artist

Mark Allen Alford Jr.
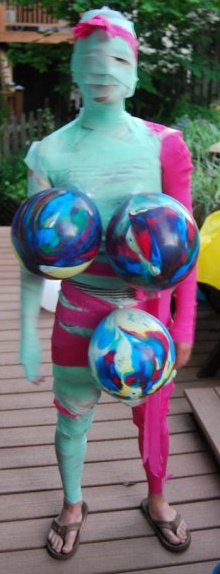
- Alford during a birthday performance
- Born: Mark Allen Alford Jr. August 17, 1991 (age 34)
- Occupation: Artist
- Website: www.markallenalfordjr.com

Mark Allen Alford Jr. (born August 17, 1991) is an American multimedia artist known for his installations and symbolic imagery. His mediums have included painting, film photography, installation art, performance art, screen printing, and video art.

He was noted for his extensive exhibition history despite his young age. He had 3 solo exhibitions and 12 group exhibitions before the age of 20. His works are in prominent public collections such as the Frederick R. Weisman Art Foundation and private collections such as Biggest Loser Winner Ali Vincent.

Alford has also been involved in directing and curating as well. He received many reviews and press from his avant-garde art show, "Under 21" featuring only artists under the age of 21. His role in this was as director and participating artist. His most acclaimed series of fashion body bags were debuted at this event. The show featured 7 artists, a curator, and director.

He has also been featured in Juxtapoz for his underwater series called "Ethereal Waters" as well as Fox and The Buzz Kansas City As of 2010 he was working in Kansas City, Missouri.
