= Athletes (Warhol series) =

1977 series of portraits by Andy Warhol

- Artist: Andy Warhol
- Year: 1977
- Medium: Acrylic and silkscreen ink on linen
- Movement: Pop Art
- Dimensions: 100 cm × 100 cm (40 in × 40 in)

Athletes is a series of silkscreen paintings created by American artist Andy Warhol in 1977. Commissioned by art collector Richard Weisman, the works consist of ten portraits based on Polaroid photographs taken by Warhol of prominent sports figures of the era, including Muhammad Ali, Pelé, Kareem Abdul-Jabbar, Chris Evert, Dorothy Hamill, Jack Nicklaus, Tom Seaver, Willie Shoemaker, O. J. Simpson, and Vitas Gerulaitis. Athletes is regarded as a notable extension of Warhol's celebrity portraiture, applying his signature Pop art style to the world of professional sports. The series reflects the growing cultural status of athletes as celebrities in the late 20th century.

== Background ==
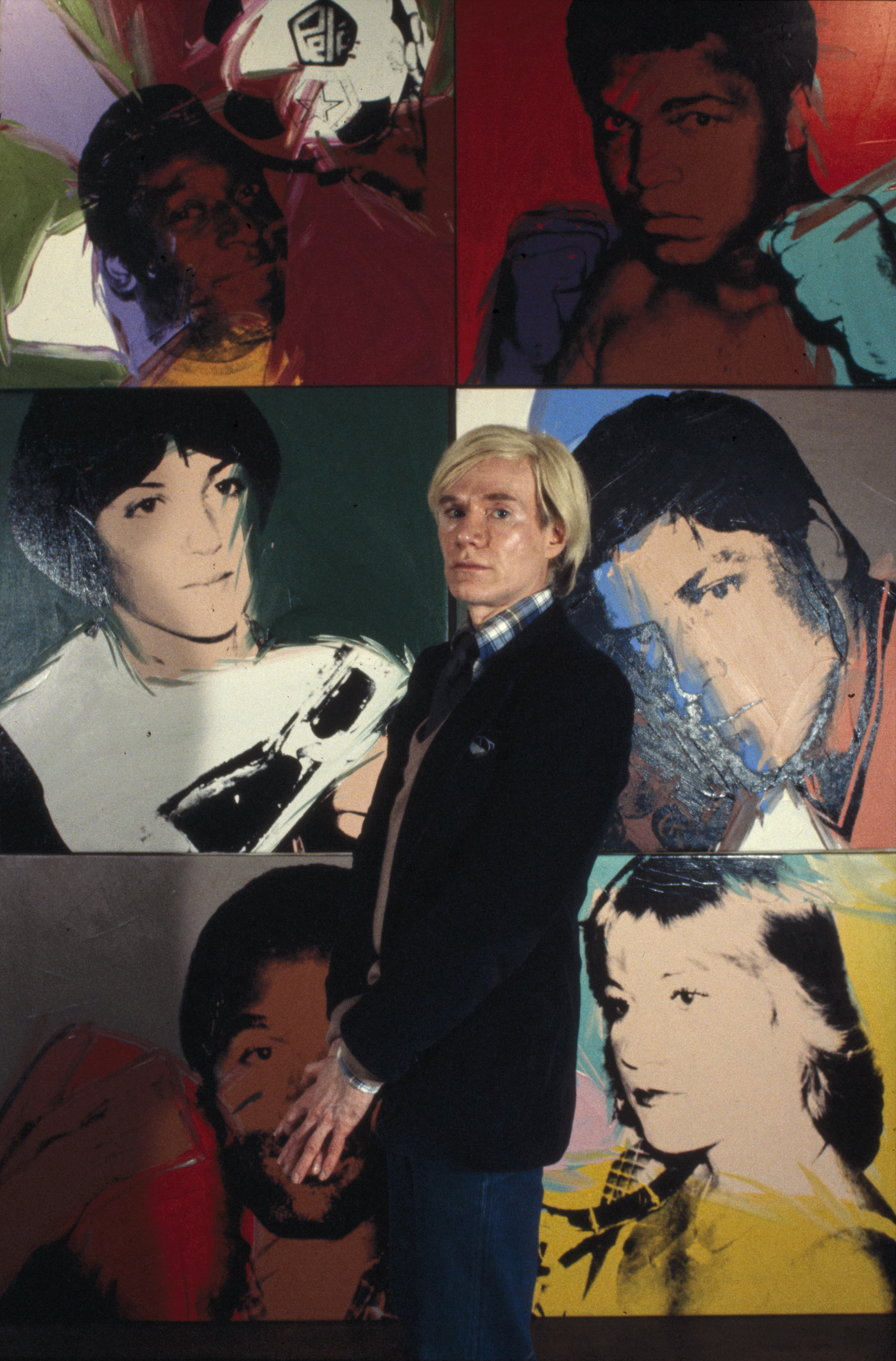
Warhol with his portraits of Pelé, Muhammad Ali, Dorothy Hamill, Tom Seaver, O.J. Simpson, and Chris Evert in 1977. Photo by Bernard Gotfryd for Newsweek (November 21, 1977)

In 1977, art collector Richard Weisman proposed a project to Pop artist Andy Warhol, suggesting that he create a series of silkscreen portraits depicting leading sports figures of the time. An avid sports fan, Weisman saw the idea as a way to merge art and athletics, recognizing the growing commercialization of sports and Warhol's fascination with celebrity and pop culture. Recalling the origins of the project in a 2007 interview with The Art Newspaper, Weisman said, "I spoke to Andy about the idea; I knew he was a groupie and loved to meet famous people."

Warhol, whose paintings of screen legends such as Marilyn Monroe and Elizabeth Taylor, captured them as symbols of America, saw athletes as the "new movie stars." Reflecting on shifting forms of celebrity, he remarked, "The kids today, instead of going into the movies, go into sports, the really good-looking ones." Warhol added, "That's the reason there are a lot of movie stars who aren't really that good-looking. In sports, they have a better chance, and then if they're really good, they go into the movies afterwards."

Except for a commissioned portrait of tennis player Vitas Gerulaitis, Warhol had not previously used athletes as subjects. Reflecting on this, he remarked, "I didn't know how to meet one." Apart from Pelé and O. J. Simpson—whom Warhol encountered at Regine's—he had not met any of the athletes prior to their Polaroid portrait sessions. Weisman chose the subjects for the series, and between March and November 1977, Warhol traveled across the United States to take Polaroid photographs of each sports star. At his studio, the Factory, he transferred his chosen frames to canvas and applied the color using his silkscreening technique.

== Production ==
The Athletes series consists of ten portraits, each measuring 40 × 40 inches, commissioned by Richard Weisman for $800,000. Warhol produced eight complete sets of the series, and Weisman retained one set. Of the remaining seven sets, three were distributed to his children, two were donated to the University of Maryland and the University of California, Los Angeles, one set was divided among the athletes depicted, and another was split among the governing associations for each sport.

Warhol made nine individual paintings as "extras," which led to a dispute after his death between his estate, the Andy Warhol Foundation, and Weisman. Weisman had a contract stating that he was the owner of all of the Athletes paintings. "In the end we settled, they gave me all of the Athletes paintings they had and I donated half of them back to the foundation on the understanding that they were not to be sold on the open market without my permission," he said.

== Subjects ==
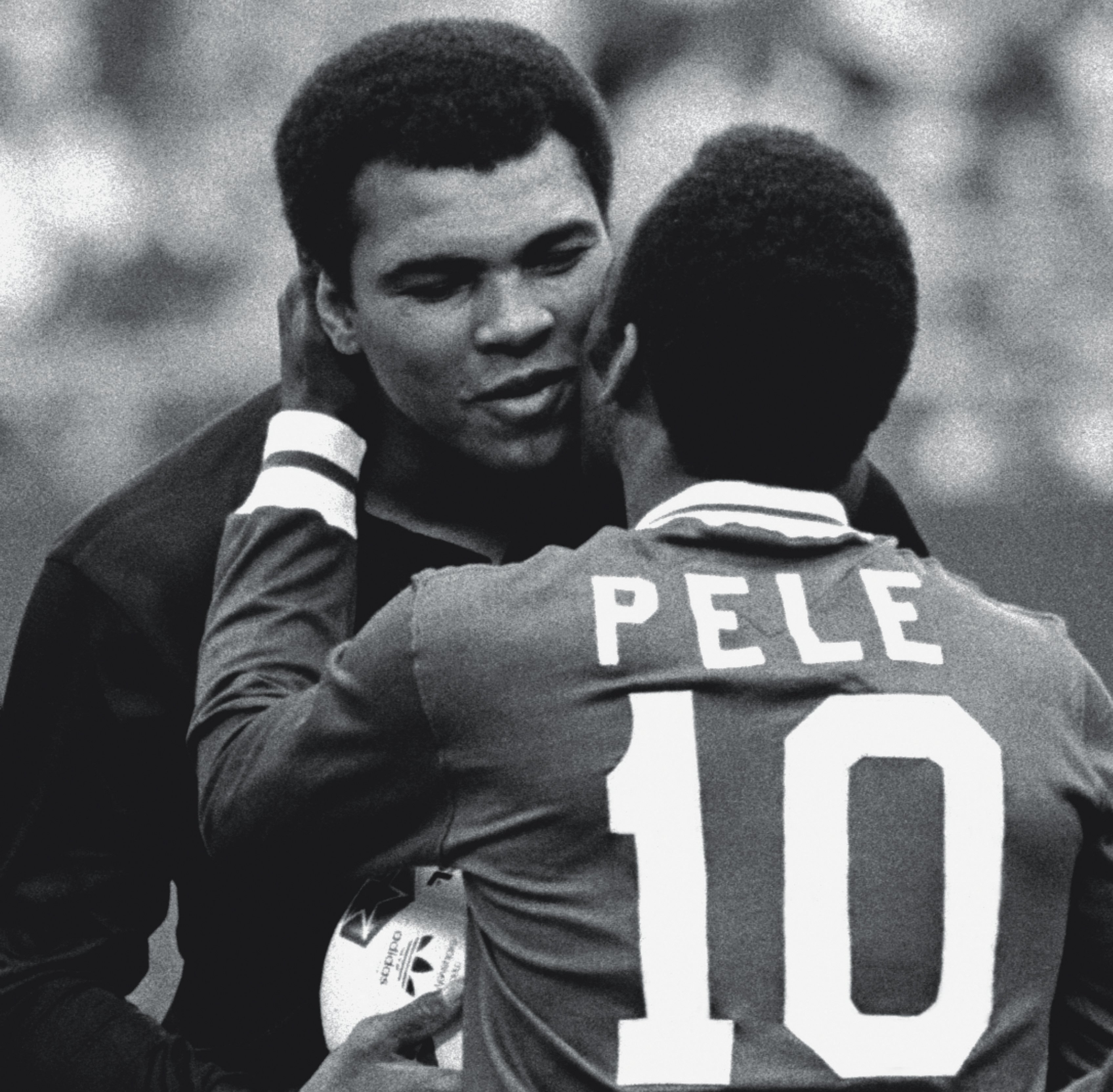
Muhammad Ali and Pelé in 1977, two subjects of the Athletes series

Richard Weisman chose the 10 athletes for the series:

- Boxer Muhammad Ali
- Tennis player Chris Evert
- Ice hockey player Rod Gilbert
- Ice skater Dorothy Hamill
- Basketball player Kareem Abdul-Jabbar
- Golfer Jack Nicklaus
- Footballer Pelé
- Baseball player Tom Seaver
- Football player O. J. Simpson
- Jockey Willie Shoemaker

Three additional people were initially considered for the series but ultimately excluded: stunt performer Evel Knievel, due to debate over whether he qualified as an athlete; basketball player Julius Erving, because of contractual complications; and gymnast Nadia Comăneci, owing to difficulties in contacting the Romanian Athletics Federation.

== Exhibitions ==
Athletes was first exhibited at Coe Kerr Gallery in New York from December 1977 to January 1978. It was then shown at the Virginia Museum of Fine Arts in Richmond from January to February 1978. The exhibition next traveled to the University Gallery at Southern Methodist University in Dallas, where it was on view from February to March 1978. It subsequently appeared at the Texas Gallery in Houston in April 1978, before being presented at the Institute of Contemporary Arts in London from June to July 1978.

In 2004, the Plains Art Museum in Fargo, North Dakota hosted an exhibition of the Athletes series from the collection of Richard Weisman.

In April 2005, the Fluxion Gallery in Omaha, Nebraska, featured an exhibition of the Athletes series from the collection of Richard Weisman.

In 2008, the series was shown at the Faurschou gallery in Beijing to coincide with the 2008 Summer Olympics.

In May 2009, an exhibition organized by Urban Compass and Pharmaka drew on the influence of the Athletes series by featuring student works inspired by the portraits. Using photographs of themselves, elementary school students in Watts created brightly colored compositions in imitation of Warhol's silkscreen technique. The project was supported by Richard Weisman, who had originally commissioned the Athletes series, and proceeds from the sale of the student works benefited educational and community programs.

From April to May 2015, the Oklahoma City Museum of Art (OKCMOA) featured the exhibition Warhol: The Athletes from the collection of Richard Weisman.

== Art market ==
When the series debuted at the Coe Kerr Gallery in 1977, the portraits were offered for sale at $25,000 each.

In 2007, Weisman offered his set of Athletes in London through art dealer Martin Summers for a reported $28 million, but it did not sell. The set sold for $5.7 million at Christie's evening contemporary art sale in New York in May 2011. A portrait of Muhammad Ali from the series, consigned to auction by Weisman's ex-wife, sold at Christie's New York for $9.2 million in 2007.

In November 2019, a set was offered as individual lots at Christie's in New York sold for a combined $15 million, led by a portrait of Muhammad Ali purchased by the Lévy Gorvy Gallery for $10 million.

In February 2020, a separate set from the Athletes series was sold at Christie's in London. The portrait of Muhammad Ali was the most sought after, selling to an American telephone bidder for £4.97 million ($6.4 million) after competition with Lévy Gorvy. Art adviser Jude Hess acquired the portrait of Brazilian footballer Pelé for £575,250 ($744,374). With the exception of the portrait of Jack Nicklaus, the works generally achieved lower prices than their New York counterparts a few months prior.
