= Frederick R. Weisman Art Foundation =

Non-profit arts foundation in California

The Frederick R. Weisman Art Foundation is a non-profit arts foundation located on North Carolwood Drive in the Holmby Hills district of Los Angeles, California. Modern and contemporary artwork in the Frederick R. Weisman collection are displayed in a "living with art—house museum" context, with guided public tours by appointment with the foundation.

== History ==
Frederick Rand Weisman (April 27, 1912 – September 11, 1994) was the third of five sons born in Minneapolis to Russian immigrants who settled in Minnesota in the 1890s. His father, William, established enterprises in a number of areas, including real estate and the fur industry. Like his father, Frederick Weisman would become a businessman.

Weisman and his wife Marcia Simon, sister of art collector Norton Simon, began collecting art in the late 1940s, starting with the works of American and European postwar artists including Willem de Kooning, Alberto Giacometti, and Mark Rothko. From 1960 to 1964, Marcia Weisman hosted monthly proselytizing classes for novice collectors, taught by Irving Blum and Walter Hopps, whose Ferus Gallery in West Hollywood was the first to show Frank Stella, Ellsworth Kelly, and Roy Lichtenstein in Los Angeles. By the mid-1960s, their collection had become well known. David Hockney portrayed them in a 1968 double portrait called American Collectors (Fred and Marcia Weisman), now in the Art Institute of Chicago, that has become one of his most famous works. The Weismans were divorced in 1979 and split the collection. While Marcia Simon Weisman donated some of her half to the newly formed Museum of Contemporary Art, Los Angeles, Frederick Weisman established the Frederick R. Weisman Art Foundation in 1982. He said, “Art is a way of life. I live with art, work with art, and fly with art, but most of all I enjoy sharing it.” It is true that he was a passionate collector. But greater than the pleasure of collecting the works of art he loved was his joy in sharing them. He said, “When you are as fortunate as I have been, you have a responsibility to share with others.” Until 1983, Weisman was considering buying a permanent exhibition space in New York for housing or exhibiting the collection. In 1986, Weisman dejectedly withdrew from plans on moving his collection to the Greystone Mansion, after two years of negotiations. Weisman also spoke of constructing a sculpture garden for the Barnsdall Art Park. Like Norton Simon, he later engaged in negotiations with UCLA to be the eventual keeper of his collection and offered to pay the cost of building a museum.

When Weisman eventually opened the art collection at his Los Angeles estate to the public, he wanted to share the experience of living with art – rather than the more formal protocol of seeing art in a gallery or museum. He thought that by encountering works of art in a domestic environment and seeing how they could be enjoyed on a day-to-day basis at the place where he himself lived from 1982 through 1992, people might leave with a fresh view of Modern and contemporary art. In 1986, Henry T. Hopkins, then director of the San Francisco Museum of Art, became director of the Frederick R. Weisman Foundation of Art which he led until 1991. In 1994, Weisman died, leaving the Frederick R. Weisman Art Foundation under the direction of his second wife and former Getty Museum conservator Billie Milam.

== Weisman architecture ==
The Weisman Foundation estate, located in the Holmby Hills area of western Los Angeles, consists of two landmark buildings in spacious gardens. The main structure is the Mediterranean Revival style two-story residence designed in the late 1920s by Los Angeles architect Gordon B. Kaufmann. The Weisman home exhibits the fine craftsmanship characteristic of the period, including custom decorative treatments on the walls and ceilings.

A postmodern style contemporary annex, or art pavilion, designed by architect Franklin D.Israel, was added in 1991 to accommodate larger-scale works.

Today the Foundation main house, annex pavilion, and surrounding gardens are accessible to the public by appointment only on guided tours.

== Collection ==
More than four hundred works of art are on display at the Foundation. The collection includes works by European Modernists including Cézanne, Picasso, and Kandinsky and Surrealist works by Max Ernst, Joan Miró, and René Magritte. The holdings in postwar art include works by Giacometti, Isamu Noguchi, Alexander Calder, Robert Rauschenberg, and Jasper Johns; Abstract Expressionist paintings by de Kooning, Sam Francis, Clyfford Still, and Mark Rothko; Color-Field paintings by Helen Frankenthaler, Morris Louis, and Kenneth Noland; and Pop Art by Andy Warhol, Roy Lichtenstein, Claes Oldenburg, and James Rosenquist. Contemporary California works include those by Ed Ruscha and Joe Goode, M.A. Alford, and Super Realist sculptures by Duane Hanson and John de Andrea.

The Foundation continues to make the collection available through loans to museums worldwide, docent tours at the Los Angeles estate, exhibitions in public-art venues, and the funding of several art museums, including the Frederick R. Weisman Museum of Art, California at Pepperdine University in Malibu, the New Orleans Museum of Art, the San Diego Museum of Art, the Walker Art Center, and the Frederick R. Weisman Art Museum at the University of Minnesota, designed by Frank Gehry.

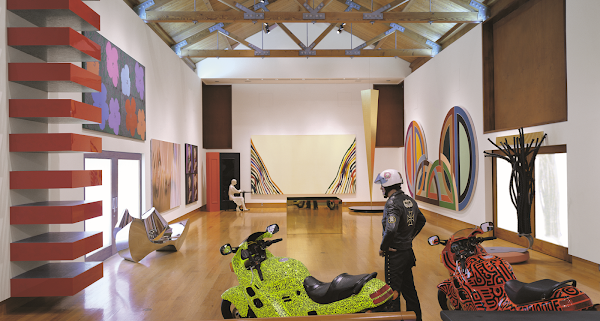
Works on display at the Frederick R. Weisman Art Foundation
