= A Bigger Splash =

1967 painting by David Hockney

- Artist: David Hockney
- Year: 1967
- Medium: Acrylic on canvas
- Dimensions: 242.5 cm × 243.9 cm (95.5 in × 96.0 in)
- Location: Tate Britain, London

A Bigger Splash is a large pop art painting by British artist David Hockney. Measuring 242.5 centimetres (95.5 in) by 243.9 centimetres (96.0 in), it depicts a swimming pool beside a modern house, disturbed by a large splash of water created by an unseen figure who has apparently just jumped in from a diving board. It was painted in California between April and June 1967, when Hockney was teaching at the University of California, Berkeley. Jack Hazan's fictionalised 1973 biopic, A Bigger Splash, concentrating on the break-up of Hockney's relationship with Peter Schlesinger, was named after the painting.

Luca Guadagnino's 2015 film A Bigger Splash (a loose remake of La Piscine) was also named after the painting.

== Description ==
A Bigger Splash shows a typical California day – warm and sunny, with a cloudless blue sky. In the background, two palm trees loom over a large single-storey house, with flat roof and large sliding glass doors, in front of which an empty director's chair with thin crossed legs stands on a wide pink patio. A shadow under the chair suggests that the sun is high in the sky, around noon. In the foreground, a yellow diving board slants away from lower right corner, leading the viewer's gaze towards the centre of a large swimming pool, where water fountains into the air, capturing the moment right after someone has dived in. The diver is not visible, presumably still under the water. The chair lies further back along the same diagonal line. A thickening in the white line atop the building's flat roof emphasises the place where the diver has entered the water.

Hockney's composition is based on a photograph of a swimming pool in a book and an earlier drawing by Hockney of Californian buildings. It was created with meticulous care, simplifying, but enlarging his earlier paintings entitled A Little Splash (1966) and The Splash (1966) (both are held in private collections; the latter was sold for £2.6 million in 2006 and for £23.1 million in 2020, both times by auction at Sotheby's in London). The canvas – almost a perfect square – is dominated by the strong vertical and horizontal lines of the trees, the building, and the edge of the pool; it is divided evenly into the sky, building and patio in the upper half, and the pool and diving board in the lower half. The rectilinear composition is broken by the oblique thrust of the diving board. The calmness of the overall composition contrasts with the violent explosion of water caused by diver. Hockney has expressed his pleasure at taking two weeks to paint a moment that lasted two seconds.

In a March 2009 interview for the Tate, to the question "Who jumped into the pool?" Hockney answers: "I don't know actually. It was done from a photograph of a splash. That I haven't taken, but that's what it's commenting on. The stillness of an image. (...) Most of the painting was spent on the splash and the splash lasts two seconds and the building is permanent there. That's what it's about actually. You have to look in at the details." Hockney’s use of photographic compositing was ahead of its time, reflecting his early experimentation with technology in art.

== Composition ==
The painting was made using acrylic Liquitex on a white cotton duck canvas, with no underdrawing. Hockney uses a limited palette – cobalt blue, ultramarine blue, raw sienna, burnt sienna, raw umber, Hooker's green, Naples yellow and titanium white – applied either mixed together or as tints. Apart from the splash, the painting was finished very evenly and flat with a paint roller, in two or three layers, with the few details – tree, grass, chair, reflections – overpainted. The central splash was heavily worked over a period of about two weeks using a variety of small brushes. A wide border and central narrow stripe at the pool's edge are left unpainted. The border creates an effect like a Polaroid photograph. The painting has been viewed as a critical link in Hockney's ruminations on time between his earlier Picture Emphasising Stillness and his later "joiners" portraits, created by collaging many photographs of the same subject taken over a period of hours.

== Sale history ==
The Marquess of Dufferin and Ava bought the finished work from John Kasmin's gallery in 1968, and sold it to the Tate in 1981.
