= John Kasmin =

British art dealer and collector (born 1934)

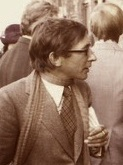
John Kasmin in 1975

John Kasmin (born as John Kaye on 24 September 1934) is a British art dealer and collector, also known as "Kas".

== Early life ==
John Kasmin was born John Kaye in Whitechapel, in 1934. His mother was a seamstress and his father was a factory foreman.

In 1938, he went to Magdalen College School in Oxford but was removed from school at 16 years of age by his father. He went to work for Pressed Steel in Cowley. At 17 years of age, he moved to New Zealand, where he had a job as a junior legal clerk.

== Further years ==
In 1956, he returned to London due to problems with the police and worked at Gallery One for Victor Musgrave. He was initially paid a half a crown (12½p) a day. He had a sexual encounter with Ida Kar, wife of Musgrave, without objection of his employer.

In 1960, he met David Hockney who, when Kasmin set up his own gallery in 1963, became one of his first artists. (Kasmin appears, as himself, in the 1974 Hockney biopic, A Bigger Splash).

Other artists that Kasmin showed included Barnett Newman, Ad Reinhardt, Frank Stella, Kenneth Noland, Morris Louis, Helen Frankenthaler, Anthony Caro, William G. Tucker, John Latham, Richard Smith, Bernard Cohen, Robin Denny, Howard Hodgkin and Gillian Ayres.

Kasmin opened a large white space on 118 New Bond Street that was unusual for the time, as until then most commercial galleries had been domestic in scale. Kasmin closed his gallery in 1972 but continued to operate in partnership with other London dealers into the 1990s. Kasmin's son Paul Kasmin opened the Kasmin Gallery in New York City in 1989.
