= Peter Schlesinger =

American sculptor

Peter Schlesinger (born April 2, 1948 in Los Angeles, California) is an American artist, author, and former artist's model who was the subject of numerous notable canvases by the British painter David Hockney (1937–2026).

== Biography ==
Peter Schlesinger was an 18-year-old student at UCLA when he met the then 28-year-old artist David Hockney, who was teaching a summer class at the university. They began a long affair; Schlesinger relocated with Hockney to London in 1968, where he subsequently undertook to study at the Slade School of Art. Whilst in a relationship with Hockney, he was often the artist's subject and muse; he appears in some of Hockney's best-known works, including Portrait of an Artist (Pool with Two Figures) (1972), Peter Schlesinger with Polaroid Camera, and Peter Getting Out of Nick's Pool. In 2018, Portrait of an Artist (Pool with Two Figures) sold for over $90 million, setting the monetary record for a painting by a living artist.

Schlesinger went on to pursue his own career as a visual artist, creating sculptures, paintings, and photographs.

== Books ==
His photography is the subject of two volumes for which he also wrote the text; A Chequered Past (2003, Thames and Hudson) and Peter Schlesinger: A Photographic Memory 1968–1989 (2015, Damiani; co-authored with Hilton Als).

== Personal life ==
The 1974 film A Bigger Splash (named after Hockney's famous painting) is about the breakup of Schlesinger's relationship with Hockney.

Schlesinger's later partner was the Swedish photographer Eric Boman, with whom he shared a home in Bellport on Long Island.
