= A Bigger Splash (1973 film) =

1973 British film about David Hockney by Jack Hazan

- Theatrical release poster
- Directed by: Jack Hazan
- Written by: Jack Hazan; David Mingay
- Produced by: Jack Hazan; Mike Kaplan
- Starring: David Hockney
- Cinematography: Jack Hazan
- Edited by: David Mingay
- Music by: Patrick Gowers
- Release dates: October 1973 (Chicago); 5 October 1974 (United States)
- Running time: 105 minutes
- Country: United Kingdom
- Language: English
- Box office: $95,826

A Bigger Splash is a 1973 British biographical documentary film about David Hockney's lingering breakup with his then-partner Peter Schlesinger, from 1970 to 1973. Directed by Jack Hazan and edited by David Mingay, it has music by Patrick Gowers. Featuring many of Hockney's circle, it includes designers Celia Birtwell and Ossie Clark, artist Patrick Procktor, gallery owner John Kasmin and museum curator Henry Geldzahler.

== Analysis ==
It is a fly-on-the-wall documentary, intercut with fictionalised and fantasy elements. It is notable for its treatment of gay themes and its insights into Hockney's life and work. The film takes its title from the 1967 painting A Bigger Splash, perhaps Hockney's best-known Californian swimming pool picture and his best-known artwork of all. Hockney was initially shocked by its intimacy but later changed his mind.

== Home video ==
A Bigger Splash was newly restored in 4K from the original camera negative by Metrograph and released on Blu-ray by Kino Lorber in 2020.

== See also ==
- Portrait of an Artist (Pool with Two Figures), 1972 Hockney painting featured in the film.
