= A Bigger Grand Canyon =

1998 painting by David Hockney

- A Bigger Grand Canyon, 1998, National Gallery of Australia
- Artist: David Hockney
- Year: 1998
- Medium: oil on sixty canvas
- Dimensions: 207 cm × 744.2 cm (81 in × 293.0 in)
- Location: National Gallery of Australia, Canberra

A Bigger Grand Canyon is a 1998 painting by David Hockney consisting of 60 canvases (in a 12x5 arrangement) that produce one large (7.4m-wide) picture. It hangs in the National Gallery of Australia, which bought it in 1999 for $4.6 million. The Cubist-type painting portrays the Grand Canyon from many viewpoints and times of day.

Hockney said that he was enthusiastic about the Grand Canyon because "It was the biggest space you could look at that had an edge." He spent fifteen years studying it before he finished his painting. In 1982, he created two Grand Canyon photo collages.

Hank Burchard wrote in The Washington Post that "Hockney's canyon has edginess that seems to stimulate visitors to walk up and down and back and forth in front of the painting rather than stand in contemplation" and called the colors "almost painfully — and almost comically — intense." Bruce Hainley of Artforum called it "a vivid sprawl of wet-clay golds, sunset reds, and desert pinks."

== Gallery ==
A Bigger Grand Canyon, 1998, National Gallery of Australia.
