= Marcus Levine =

British nail artist and sculptor (born 1965)

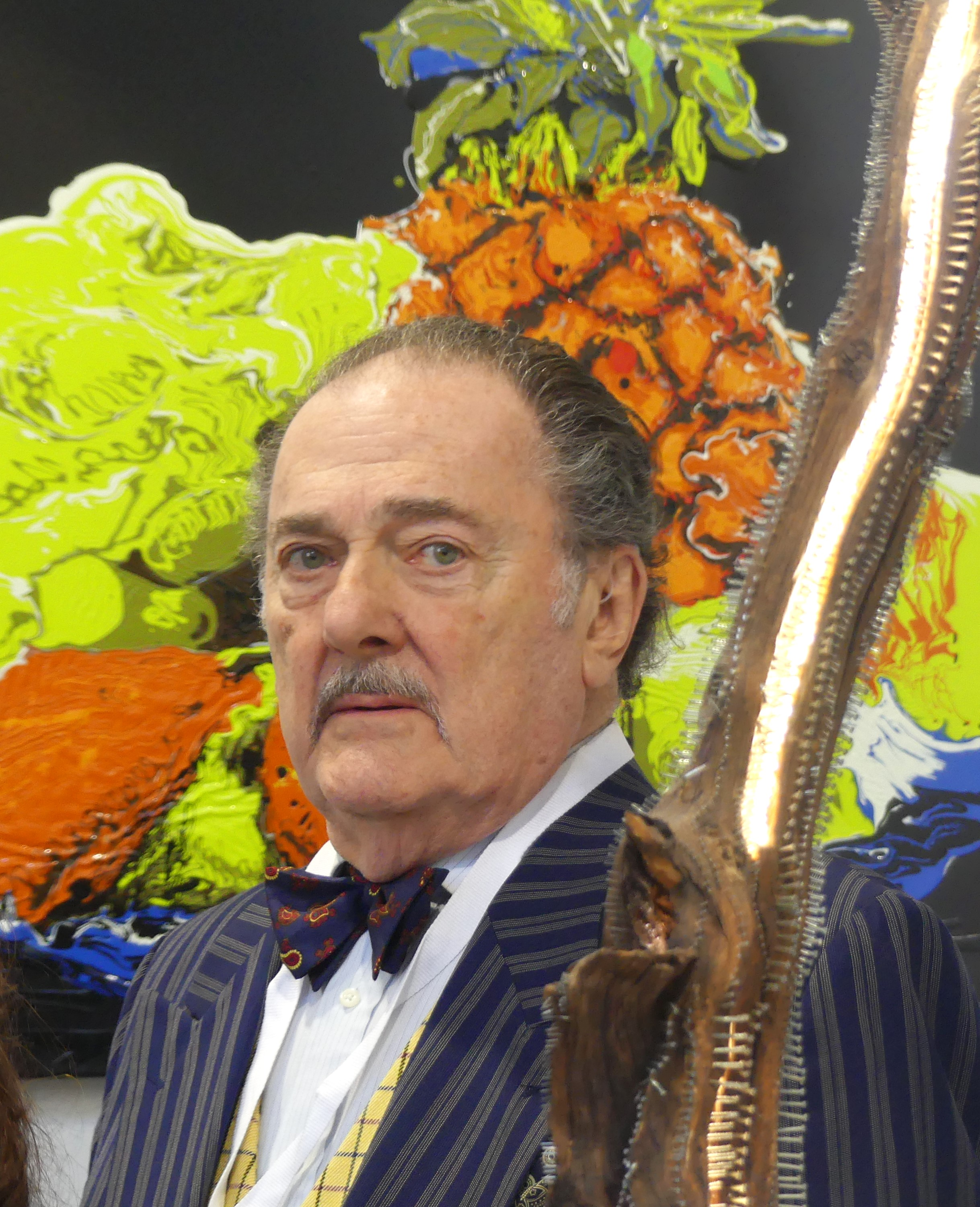
- Born: Leeds, Yorkshire, United Kingdom
- Education: Leeds College of Art
- Occupations: Sculptor & Artist
- Years active: 1980s-present
- Known for: Nail Sculptures
- Website: Levine-Art.co.uk

Marcus Levine (born 29 June 1965, in Leeds, England) is a British nail artist and sculptor. He was born in Yorkshire, England and studied at the Leeds College of Art. His work has featured in The Telegraph, Hello magazine and ArtDaily, along with regional television appearances on BBC Look North and ITV Calendar. He has also carried out radio interviews, with W-Radio in Colombia and Pete Price City Radio.

He is known as a specialist artist in physical pointillism and creator of the figurative nail sculpture art-form. His works of art can contain from 15,000 to 200,000 nails, depending on their size and complexity. Levine's work is known for its abstract approaches, with influences from Michelangelo and Auguste Rodin.

== Early life ==
Levine was born in Yorkshire, England. He attended the Leeds College of Art in Leeds, Yorkshire where he first became interested in abstract art. It was stated in The Yorkshire Post that Levine attended the art college with Damien Hurst.

== Career ==
Levine began his career as an artist working with abstract works, but became interested in sculptures after he noticed "the interplay between the rigid, angular nails and the soft curves of the human torso". Levine became a nail sculptor in 2004, after spending much of his early career working with different art forms.

His first major position in art was at Harlech Television in Bristol, England as a Quantel Paintbox designer in the late 1980s. In 1989, he moved to work for a family printing machines and supplies business. While working at the business, he focused his artist practice on Photography, Landscape watercolours and acrylic portraiture.

Levine created his first figurative nail sculpture in 2004 and is believed to be the first person to use nails to describe figurative studies in this way. Levine stated that he was unhappy with his first attempt, which was eventually discarded. His Hungarian wife Krisztina acted as his muse for much of his early work 2004–2007. After revisiting his strategy, he created a second piece, which was purchased by a business friend. His first solo exhibition came soon after and was so successful it allowed Levine to quit his job and become a full-time sculptor and nail artist. Within three years, Levine was given the opportunity to exhibit at Gallery 27 in Cork Street, London. It was during this first London exhibition that a photographer from Hello magazine, came to photograph work at Gallery 27. According to Levine, this caused a snowball effect in interest with his work globally, he sold a nude study to an art collector in Beirut, a Greek shipping magnate along with several domestic sales in the UK. The exhibition generated great interest from outside the UK. Levine split his time between the UK and Budapest, Hungary, where he worked on sculptures for a couple of months at a time.

Throughout his career as a nail sculptor, Levine has used a number of different techniques and nails. His non-representational pieces allow him to use larger clout nails, which add depth to his sculptures. On other pieces, Levine has been known to use 20mm cabinet nails. He has also worked in a number of exhibitions, including Air Gallery in London. and Rarity Gallery in Greece 2014/2015.

Levine held an exhibition at the Finite Gallery near Leeds Bradford Airport in 2010. Prior to the exhibition, he appeared on BBC Look North, to explain his technique and the typical works he produced.

In 2011, Levine unveiled a sculpture outside Cartwright Hall in Bradford, Yorkshire. In March 2013, he exhibited at the JA Festival in Leeds, Yorkshire and featured on ITV Calendar.

== Technique and style ==
The technique of many nail sculptors varies. Levine stated in an interview with Global News that it can often take anywhere between two days to two months to create the various sculptures. The 3D art can often contain anything from 15,000 to 200,000 nails. His work has sometimes been referred to as physical pointillism.

The larger pieces of work that are created by Levine, often contain three different type and sizes of nails. While some artists may sketch the work out beforehand, Levine made it clear that all the sculptures are created by freehand. Levine has stated that light plays an integral part in the creation of his projects, due to the 3D aspects of his work.

Its quite common for the completed pieces of art to appear differently at different times of the day, depending on the light conditions and combination of artificial and natural light. He said in an interview, "the shadows across the sculptures change and affect the contrast, and by altering artificial lighting, the sculptures can appear as light as a pencil sketch or as dark as a charcoal drawing."

Levine stated in an interview that many of his works are influenced by Michelangelo and Auguste Rodin. "A lot of my sculptures are classical nudes in the vein of Michaelangelo or Rodin. They're in a historical style but with an industrial twist."

== Notable works ==
Levine created a piece of art made from 28,000 nails at Cartwright Hall in Bradford, Yorkshire in 2011. The art work was called Hung Out to Dry and is currently displayed outside Bradford's Cartwright Hall. The work was commissioned by Bradford Council, with the sculpture standing at 5 metres high and features a stainless steel panel hung between two giant steel nails. Hung Out to Dry is displayed in Lister Park, Bradford.

During the same year, he was commissioned by Cartwright Hall to create a sculpture for Bradford's civic art gallery.

In 2012, Levine was commissioned by the British Science Association to create a sensory Oak nail sculpture, hand carved out of 4m of green Oak tree trunk, which was displayed at the Bradford Science Festival. Afterwards it was moved to the University of Bradford and is displayed outside the university's main entrance.

From 2013, Levine began to work on a number of private commissions. The first, was for a nail homage to the most expensive handbag in the world, which at the time cost $1.9 million. This was with full approval and consent for Ginza Tanaka jewellers. A portrait of Dominic North was commissioned in the same year.

In early 2015, Levine presented a portrait to the ex footballer and actor, Vinnie Jones. The work was called Hard as Nails, based on the well-known image of Jones from his days in Hollywood.

In May 2015, Al Pacino commissioned a piece of work on himself, which was created by Levine. His work has been steadily rising in value, with the Al Pacino artwork costing £42,000.
