= David Hockney =

British artist (1937–2026)

David Hockney OM CH RA
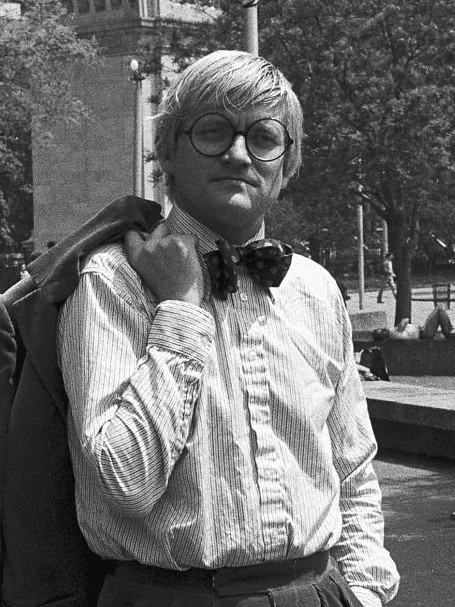
- Hockney in 1977
- Born: 9 July 1937; Bradford, West Yorkshire, England
- Died: 11 June 2026 (aged 88); London, England
- Education: Bradford School of Art (1953–1958); Royal College of Art (1959–1962)
- Known for: Painting; drawing; printmaking; photography; iPad drawing; set design
- Movement: Pop art
- Awards: See list: John Moores Painting Prize (1967); Praemium Imperiale (1989); Member of the Order of the Companions of Honour (1997); Royal Academician; Order of Merit (2012); Honorary doctorate, Otis College of Art and Design (1985)
- David Hockney's voice Recorded September 2011 from the BBC Radio 4 programme Front Row
- Website: www.hockney.com/home

David Hockney (9 July 1937 – 11 June 2026) was a British painter, stage designer and photographer. As an important contributor to the pop art movement of the 1960s, he is considered one of the most influential British artists of the 20th and 21st centuries. He was known for his vivid, stylised realism and championed figurative work, often in a bold style, during a period when abstract art predominated.

Hockney studied at the Royal College of Art before moving to Los Angeles in the 1960s. The light and lifestyle of California had a profound effect on his work; using acrylic paint, he worked on large portrait studies before turning to prints and photocollages in his later career. He used digital applications extensively in the final decades of his career and returned to the Yorkshire landscapes of his childhood with large en plein air pieces. He was also a celebrated operatic stage designer. Hockney exhibited internationally with several important retrospectives at leading institutions and was the recipient of major civic and institutional honours. Hockney came out as gay as a young man several years before the decriminalisation of homosexuality in Britain. He lived between the United Kingdom, France and the United States. In the late 2010s, auction sales established him as the most expensive living artist.

== Early life and education ==
David Hockney was born on 9 July 1937 in Bradford, West Yorkshire, England, the fourth of five children of Kenneth Hockney (1904–1978), an accountant's clerk who later ran his own accountancy business and who had been a conscientious objector in the Second World War, and Laura (1900–1999) née Thompson, a devout Methodist and strict vegetarian. He was educated at Wellington Primary School, Bradford Grammar School, Bradford College of Art (his teachers there included Frank Lisle, and his fellow students included Derek Boshier, Pauline Boty, Angela McCaul, Norman Stevens, David Oxtoby and John Loker) and the Royal College of Art (RCA) in London, where he met R. B. Kitaj, Frank Bowling and Neil Stokoe.

At the RCA Hockney featured alongside Peter Blake in the exhibition New Contemporaries, which announced the arrival of British Pop art. He was associated with the movement, but his early works display expressionist elements which are similar to some of Francis Bacon's works.

When the RCA said it would not let him graduate if he did not complete an assignment of a life drawing of a live model in 1962, Hockney painted Life Painting for a Diploma in protest. He had refused to write an essay required for the final examination and said that he should be assessed solely on his artworks. Recognising his talent and growing reputation, the RCA changed its regulations and awarded him a diploma. After leaving the RCA, he taught at Maidstone College of Art for a short time. He taught at the University of Iowa in 1964. Hockney also taught at the University of Colorado, Boulder, in 1965. Next he taught at the University of California, Los Angeles, from 1966 to 1967 and then at the University of California, Berkeley, in 1967.

== Career ==
In 1964 Hockney moved to Los Angeles, where he was inspired to make a series of paintings of swimming pools in the comparatively new acrylic medium using vibrant colours. He lived at various times in Los Angeles, London, and Paris from the late 1960s to 1970s. In 1974 he began a decade-long personal relationship with Gregory Evans, who moved with him to the US in 1976 and, as of 2019, remained a business partner.

In 1978 he rented a home in the Hollywood Hills; he later bought and expanded the house to include his studio. He also owned a 1,643-square-foot (152.6 m^{2}) beach house at 21039 Pacific Coast Highway in Malibu, which he sold in 1999 for about $1.5 million (£1.2 million). In the 1990s, Hockney returned more often to Yorkshire, usually every three months, to visit his mother, who died in 1999. Until 1997, he rarely stayed for more than two weeks, when his friend Jonathan Silver who was terminally ill, encouraged him to capture the local surroundings. At first, he did this with paintings based on memory, some from his boyhood. In 1998, he completed his painting of the Yorkshire landmark Garrowby Hill. Hockney returned to Yorkshire for increasingly longer stays and, by 2003, was painting the countryside en plein air in both oils and watercolour.

Hockney set up residence and studio in a converted bed and breakfast, in the seaside town of Bridlington, about 75 mi (121 km) from where he was born. The oil paintings he produced after 2005 were influenced by his intensive studies in watercolour, a series titled Midsummer: East Yorkshire (2003–2004). He created paintings made of multiple smaller canvases – two to fifty – placed together. To help him visualise work at that scale, he used digital photographic reproductions to study the day's work.

In 2019 he created a studio at La Grande Cour, a rustic farmhouse near Beuvron-en-Auge in Normandy. He spent a year there, using a concertina sketchpad and an iPad to work outside painting the changing seasons in a series of images inspired by the Bayeux Tapestry.

=== Work ===
Hockney experimented with painting, drawing, printmaking, watercolours, photography, and many other media, including a fax machine, paper pulp, computer applications, and iPad drawing programs. The subject matter of his interest ranges from still lifes to landscapes, portraits of friends, his dogs, and stage designs for the Royal Court Theatre, Glyndebourne, and the Metropolitan Opera in New York City.

=== Portraits ===
Hockney returned to painting portraits throughout his career. From 1968, and for the next few years, he painted portraits and double portraits of friends, lovers, and relatives just under life-size in a realistic style that adroitly captured the likenesses of his subjects. Hockney was repeatedly drawn to the same subjects – his family, employees, artists Mo McDermott and Maurice Payne, various writers he had known, fashion designers Celia Birtwell and Ossie Clark (Mr. and Mrs. Clark and Percy, 1970–71), curator Henry Geldzahler, art dealer Nicholas Wilder, George Lawson and his ballet dancer lover, Wayne Sleep, and also his romantic interests throughout the years, including Peter Schlesinger and Gregory Evans. Perhaps more than all of these, Hockney turned to his own figure year after year, creating over 300 self-portraits.

From 1999 to 2001 Hockney used a camera lucida for his research into art history, as well as his own work in the studio. He created over 200 drawings of friends, family, and himself using this antique lens-based device.

In 2016 the Royal Academy exhibited Hockney's series entitled 82 Portraits and 1 Still-life which travelled to Ca' Pesaro in Venice, Italy, to the Guggenheim Museum Bilbao in 2017 and to the Los Angeles County Museum of Art in 2018. Hockney called the paintings started in 2013 "twenty-hour exposures" because each sitting took six to seven hours on three consecutive days.

=== Printmaking ===
Hockney experimented with printmaking as early as a lithograph Self-Portrait in 1954 and worked in etchings during his time at RCA. One of his earliest lithographs, Fish & Chip Shop, was given to his local chip shop, the Sea Catch in Eccleshill in 1954. It was sold at auction at Christie's in London in 2017, with an estimate of £6,000–8,000. In 1965, the print workshop Gemini G.E.L. approached him to create a series of lithographs with a Los Angeles theme. Hockney responded by creating The Hollywood Collection, a series of lithographs recreating the art collection of a Hollywood star, each piece depicting an imagined work of art within a frame. Hockney went on to produce many other portfolios with Gemini G.E.L. including Friends, The Weather Series, and Some New Prints. During the 1960s, he produced several series of prints he thought of as 'graphic tales', including A Rake's Progress (1961–1963) after Hogarth, Illustrations for Fourteen Poems from C.P. Cavafy (1966) and Illustrations for Six Fairy Tales from the Brothers Grimm (1969).

In 1973 Hockney began a fruitful collaboration with Aldo Crommelynck, Picasso's preferred printer. In his atelier, he adopted Crommelynck's trademark sugar lift, as well as a system of the master's own devising of imposing a wooden frame onto the plate to ensure colour separation. Their early work together included Artist and Model (1973–1974) and Contrejour in the French Style (1974). From 1976 to 1977, Hockney created The Blue Guitar, a suite of 20 etchings, each utilising Crommelynck's techniques and filled with references to Picasso. The frontispiece to the suite mentions Hockney's dual inspiration; "The Blue Guitar: Etchings By David Hockney Who Was Inspired By Wallace Stevens Who Was Inspired By Pablo Picasso". The etchings refer to themes in a poem by Wallace Stevens, The Man with the Blue Guitar. It was published by Petersburg Press in October 1977. That year, Petersburg also published a book in which the images were accompanied by the poem's text.

In the summer of 1978 Hockney stayed for six weeks with his friend the printer Ken Tyler at Tyler's studio in New York, Tyler Graphics Ltd. Tyler invited Hockney to try a new technique with liquid paper. The process is painting with the paper itself, so the artist had to do it himself by hand. Each image becomes a unique work between printmaking and painting. In six weeks, Hockney created a total of 29 artworks with a series of 17 sunflowers and swimming pools. Many of the works are very similar, differentiated by changes in colour choice and application of the colour. Some are solely coloured using paper pulp, while some use spray paint to achieve certain details.

Some of Hockney's other print portfolios include Home Made Prints (1986), Recent Etchings (1998) and Moving Focus (1984–1986), which contains lithographs related to A Walk Around the Hotel Courtyard, Acatlan. A retrospective of his prints, including 'computer drawings' printed on fax machines and inkjet printers, was exhibited at Dulwich Picture Gallery in London 5 February – 11 May 2014 and Bowes Museum, County Durham 7 June – 28 September 2014, with an accompanying publication, Hockney, Printmaker, by Richard Lloyd.

=== Photocollages ===
In the early 1980s Hockney began to produce photo collages – which, in his early explorations within his personal photo albums, he referred to as "joiners" – first using Polaroid prints and subsequently 35 mm commercially processed colour prints. Using multiple prints of a single subject, Hockney arranged a patchwork to make a composite image. Because the photographs are taken from different perspectives and at slightly different times, the result was work that has an affinity with Cubism. One of Hockney's major aims was to discuss the way human vision works. Some pieces are landscapes, such as Pearblossom Highway #2, while others are portraits, including Kasmin 1982 and My Mother, Bolton Abbey, 1982.

He arrived at the idea of "joiners" accidentally. In the late 1960s, he noticed that photographers were using cameras with wide-angle lenses; he did not like the resulting photographs because they looked somewhat distorted. While working on a painting of a living room and terrace in Los Angeles, he took Polaroid shots of the living room and glued them together, not intending for them to be a composition on their own. On looking at the final composition, he realised it created a narrative, as if the viewer moved through the room. He began to work more with photography after this discovery, stopping painting for a while to pursue this new technique exclusively.

Over time he also discovered what he could not capture with a lens, saying: "Photography seems to be rather good at portraiture, or can be. But, it can't tell you about space, which is the essence of landscape. For me anyway. Even Ansel Adams can't quite prepare you for what Yosemite looks like when you go through that tunnel and you come out the other side." Frustrated with the limitations of photography and its 'one-eyed' approach, he returned to painting.

=== Other media and technology ===
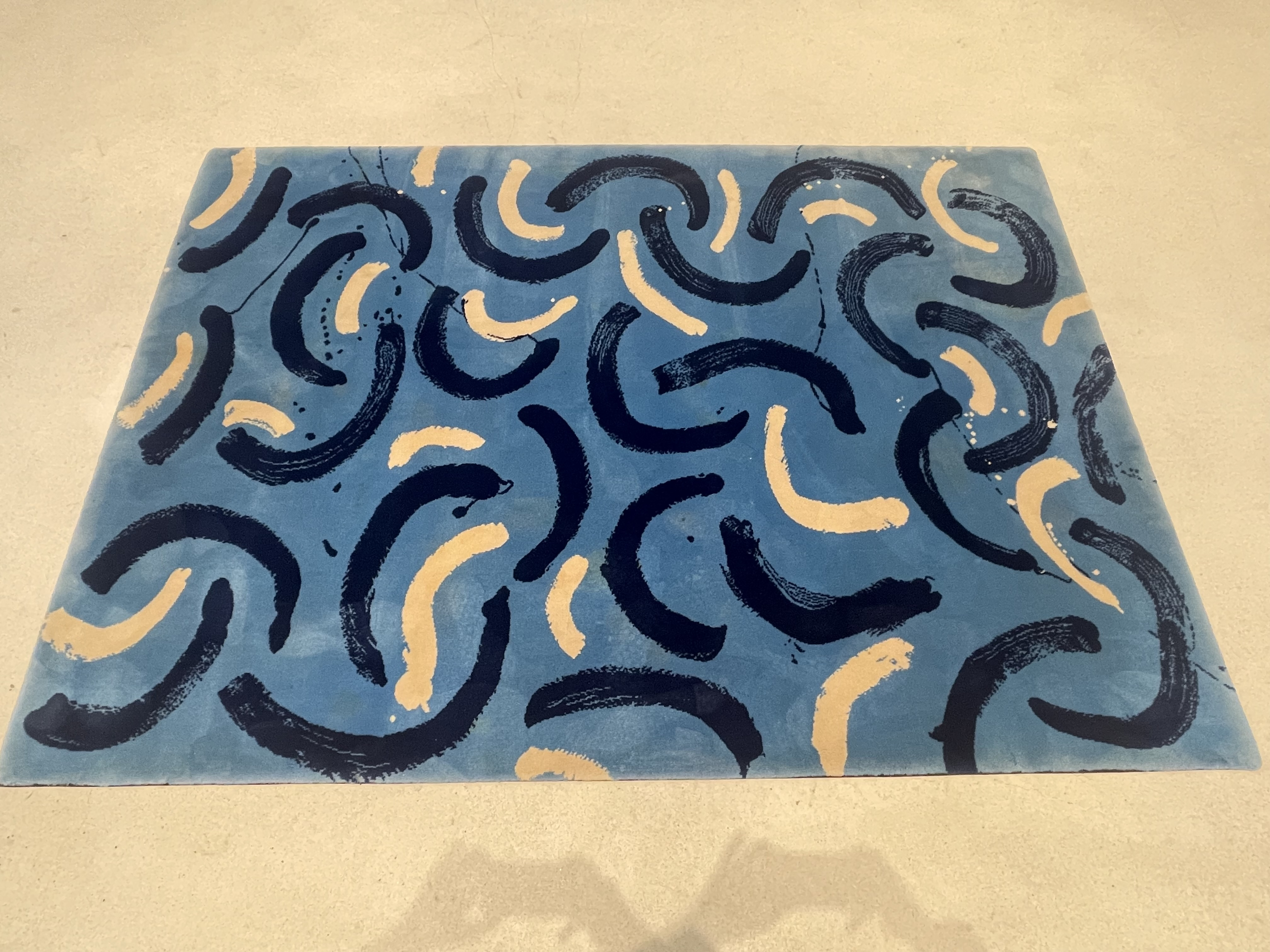
Woollen carpet, Museu Pavilhão Julião Sarmento, Lisbon, 1991

In December 1985 Hockney used the Quantel Paintbox, a computer that allowed the artist to sketch directly onto the screen. The resulting work was featured in a BBC series Painting with Light that profiled several artists. In 1999–2001, his sister, Margaret, began experimenting with digital photography, scanning and computer printing, particularly making images of flowers scanning a small Japanese vase and fresh flowers. In 2003, she was experimenting with Photoshop, scanning summer flowers and building up images in layers which Margaret printed out on an A3 printer. In 2004, Hockney went to stay with Margaret and she helped him scan his sketchbook of Yorkshire landscape and he soon began using a Wacom pad and pen directly into Photoshop.

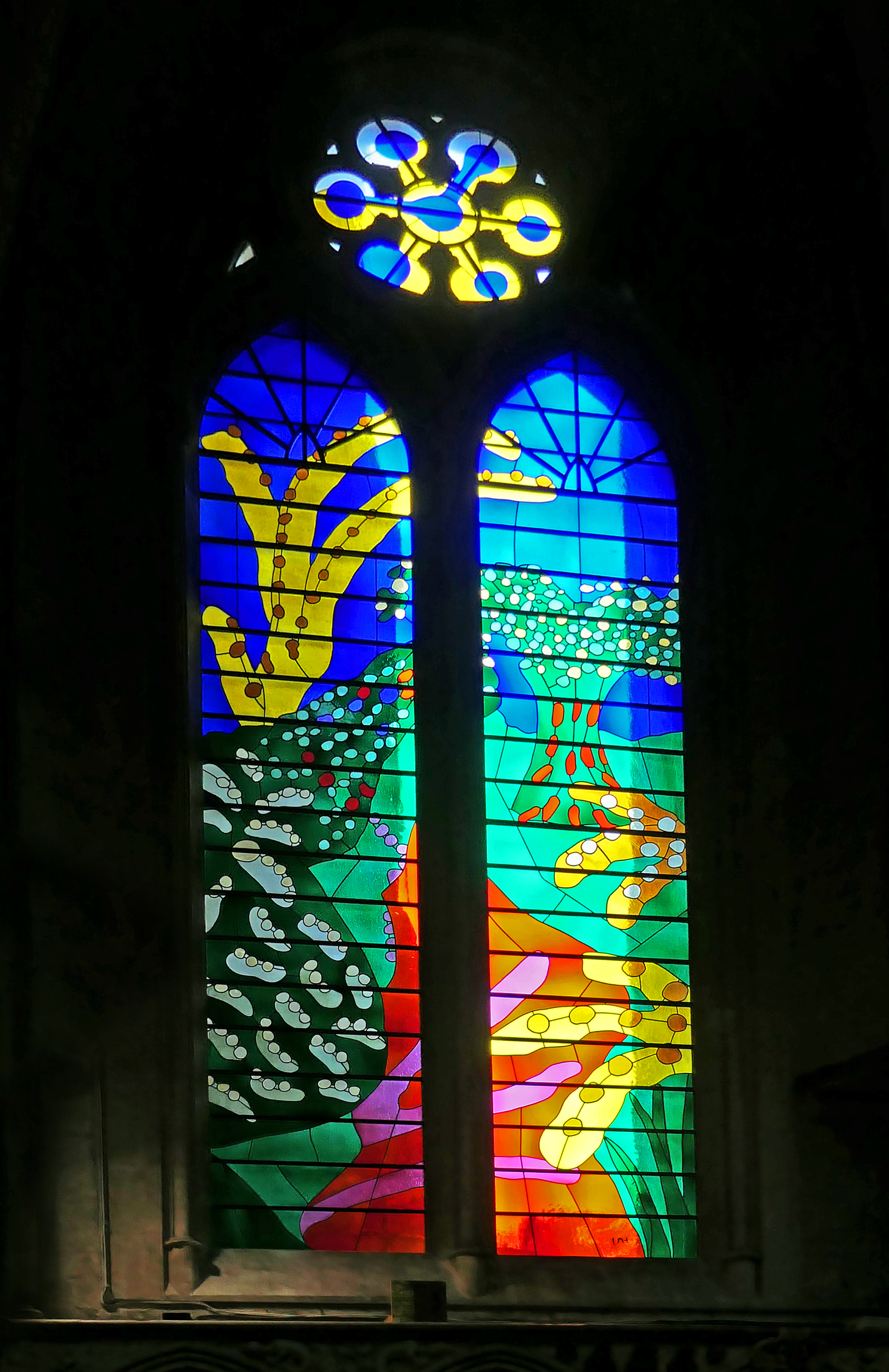
The Queen's Window, Westminster Abbey

From 2009 onward Hockney painted hundreds of portraits, still lifes, and landscapes using the free and open-source Brushes Redux iPhone and iPad application, often sending them to his friends. In 2010 and 2011, Hockney visited Yosemite National Park to draw its landscape on his iPad. He used an iPad in designing a stained glass window at Westminster Abbey which celebrated the reign of Queen Elizabeth II. Unveiled in September 2018, the Queen's Window is located in the north transept of the Abbey and features a hawthorn blossom scene which is set in Yorkshire.

From 2010 to 2014 Hockney created multi-camera movies using three to eighteen cameras to record a single scene. He filmed the landscape of Yorkshire in various seasons, jugglers and dancers, and his own exhibitions within the de Young Museum and the Royal Academy of Arts. His earlier photo collages influenced his shift to another medium, digital photography. He combined hundreds of photographs to create multi-viewpoint "photographic drawings" of groups of his friends in 2014. Hockney picked the process back up in 2017, this time using the more advanced Agisoft PhotoScan photogrammetric software which allowed him to stitch together and rearrange thousands of photos. The resulting images were printed out as massive photomurals and were exhibited at Pace Gallery and LACMA in 2018.

=== Plein air landscapes ===
In June 2007 Hockney's largest painting, Bigger Trees Near Warter or/ou Peinture sur le Motif pour le Nouvel Age Post-Photographique, which measures 15 by 40 feet (4.6 by 12.2 m), was hung in the Royal Academy's largest gallery in its annual Summer Exhibition. This work "is a monumental-scale view of a coppice in Hockney's native Yorkshire, between Bridlington and York. It was painted on 50 individual canvases, mostly working in situ, over five weeks last winter." In 2008, he donated it to Tate in London, saying: "I thought if I'm going to give something to the Tate I want to give them something really good. It's going to be here for a while. I don't want to give things I'm not too proud of ... I thought this was a good painting because it's of England ... it seems like a good thing to do." The painting was the subject of a BBC1 Imagine film documentary by Bruno Wollheim called David Hockney: A Bigger Picture (2009) which followed Hockney as he worked outdoors over the preceding two years.

=== Theatre works ===
Hockney's initial stage designs were for Ubu Roi at London's Royal Court Theatre in 1966, Igor Stravinsky's The Rake's Progress at the Glyndebourne Festival Opera in 1975, and The Magic Flute for Glyndebourne in 1978. In 1980, he agreed to design sets and costumes for a 20th-century French triple bill at the Metropolitan Opera House with the title Parade. The works were Parade, a ballet with music by Erik Satie; Les Mamelles de Tirésias, an opera with libretto by Guillaume Apollinaire and music by Francis Poulenc, and L'enfant et les sortilèges, an opera with libretto by Colette and music by Maurice Ravel. The reimagined set of L'enfant et les sortilèges from the 1983 exhibition Hockney Paints the Stage is a permanent installation at the Spalding House branch of the Honolulu Museum of Art. He designed sets for another triple bill of Stravinsky's Le sacre du printemps, Le rossignol, and Oedipus Rex for the Metropolitan Opera in 1981 as well as Richard Wagner's Tristan und Isolde for the Los Angeles Music Center Opera in 1987, Giacomo Puccini's Turandot in 1991 at the Lyric Opera of Chicago, and Richard Strauss's Die Frau ohne Schatten in 1992 at the Royal Opera House in London. In 1994, he designed costumes and scenery for twelve opera arias for the TV broadcast of Plácido Domingo's Operalia in Mexico City. Technical advances allowed him to become increasingly complex in model-making. At his studio he had a proscenium opening 6 feet (1.8 m) by 4 feet (1.2 m) in which he built sets in 1:8 scale. He also used a computerised setup that let him punch in and programme lighting cues at will and synchronise them with the music soundtrack.

In 2017 Hockney was awarded the San Francisco Opera Medal on the occasion of the revival and restoration of his production for Turandot. The majority of his theatre works and stage design studies are found in the collection of The David Hockney Foundation.

== Exhibitions ==
Hockney was featured in over 400 solo exhibitions and over 500 group exhibitions. He had his first one-man show at Kasmin Limited when he was 26 in 1963, and by 1970 the Whitechapel Gallery in London had organised the first of several major retrospectives, which subsequently travelled to three European institutions. LACMA also hosted a retrospective exhibition in 1988 which travelled to The Met, New York, and Tate, London. In 2004, he was included in the cross-generational Whitney Biennial, where his portraits appeared in a gallery with those of a younger artist he had inspired, Elizabeth Peyton.

In October 2006 the National Portrait Gallery in London organised one of the largest ever displays of Hockney's portraiture work, including 150 paintings, drawings, prints, sketchbooks, and photocollages from over five decades. The collection ranged from his earliest self-portraits to work he completed in 2005. Hockney assisted in displaying the works and the exhibition, which ran until January 2007, was one of the gallery's most successful. In 2009, "David Hockney: Just Nature" attracted some 100,000 visitors at the Kunsthalle Würth in Schwäbisch Hall, Germany.

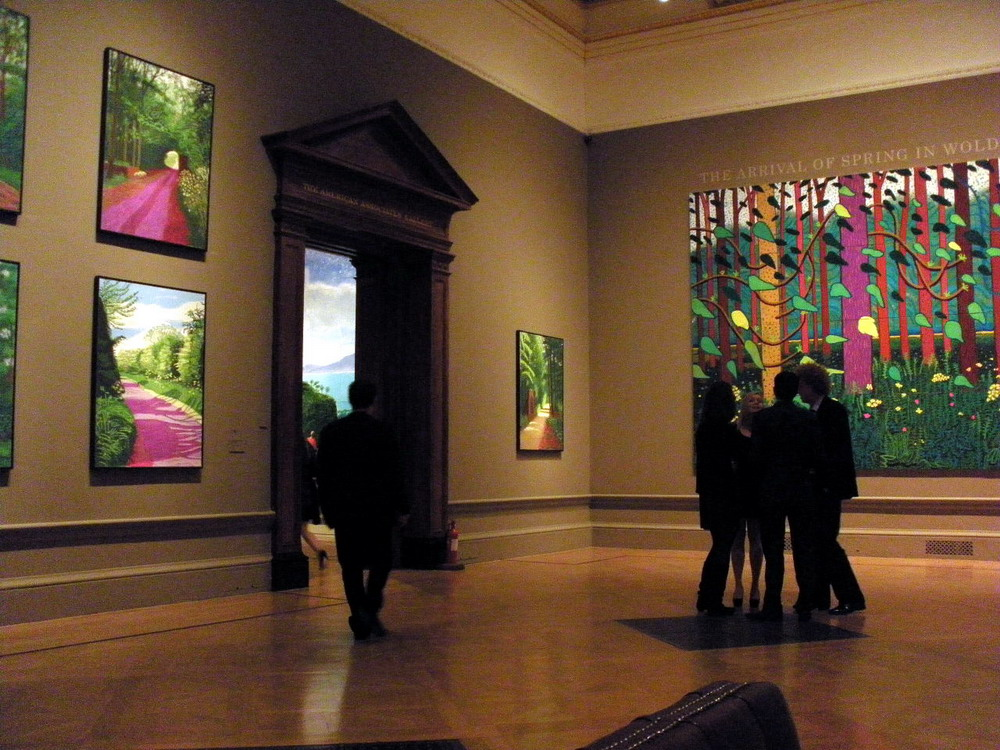
A Bigger Picture at the Royal Academy in London, January 2012

From 21 January 2012 to 9 April 2012 the Royal Academy presented A Bigger Picture, which included more than 150 works, many of which took up entire walls in the gallery's brightly lit rooms. The exhibition was dedicated to landscapes, especially trees and tree tunnels of Hockney's native Yorkshire. Works included oil paintings, watercolours, and drawings created on an iPad and printed on paper. Hockney said, in a 2012 interview, "It's about big things. You can make paintings bigger. We're also making photographs bigger, videos bigger, all to do with drawing." The exhibition drew more than 600,000 visitors in under 3 months. The exhibition moved to the Guggenheim Museum in Bilbao, Spain, from 15 May to 30 September, and from there to Museum Ludwig in Cologne, Germany, between 27 October 2012 and 3 February 2013.

From 26 October 2013 to 30 January 2014 David Hockney: A Bigger Exhibition was presented at the de Young Museum, one of the Fine Arts Museums of San Francisco. The largest solo exhibition Hockney had, with 397 works of art in more than 18,000 square feet, was curated by Gregory Evans and included the only public showing of The Great Wall, developed during research for Secret Knowledge, and works from 1999 to 2013 in a variety of media from camera lucida drawings to watercolours, oil paintings, and digital works.

From 9 February to 29 May 2017 David Hockney was presented at Tate Britain, becoming the most-visited exhibition in the gallery's history. The exhibition marked Hockney's 80th year and gathered together "an extensive selection of David Hockney's most famous works celebrating his achievements in painting, drawing, print, photography and video across six decades". Tabish Khan in his five-star review for Londonist drew attention to Hockney's adaptation of new technology for the exhibition stating, "What we love the most about Hockney is that he doesn't stop experimenting with age. Many of his iPad drawings are on display and while not his finest work, they show he's willing to try out new tools and techniques." The show then travelled to Centre Georges Pompidou in Paris and The Metropolitan Museum of Art. The wildly popular retrospective landed among the top ten ticketed exhibitions in London and Paris for 2017 with over 4,000 visitors per day at the Tate and over 5,000 visitors per day in Paris.

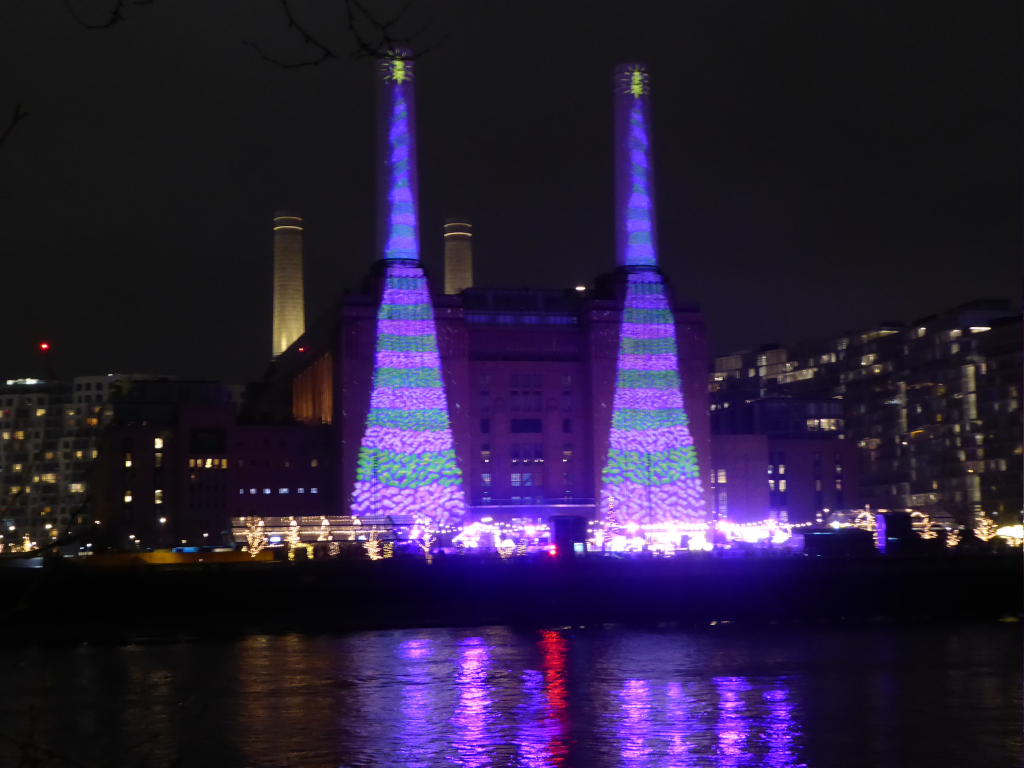
Hockney's Bigger Christmas Trees light display, Battersea Power Station, 2023

After the blockbuster exhibitions in 2017 of the works of decades past, Hockney went on to display his newest paintings on hexagonal canvases and mural-size 3D photographic drawings at Pace Gallery in 2018. He revisited paintings of Garrowby Hill, the Grand Canyon, and Nichols Canyon Road, this time painting them on hexagonal canvases to enhance aspects of reverse perspective. In 2019, his early work featured in his native Yorkshire at The Hepworth Wakefield. The travelling exhibition David Hockney: The Arrival of Spring, Normandy, 2020 presented the iPad drawings at the Royal Academy of Arts in London (23 May–26 September 2021), BOZAR in Brussels (8 October 2021 – 23 January 2022), the Sakıp Sabancı Museum in Istanbul (11 May–29 July 2022), and the Art Institute of Chicago (20 August 2022 – 9 January 2023). From April to June 2022 an exhibition "Hockney's Eye: The Art and Technology of Depiction" was held at the Fitzwilliam Museum of the University of Cambridge and at the city's Heong Gallery. In 2023 the Honolulu Museum of Art (HMoA) presented "David Hockney: Perspective Should Be Reversed, Prints from the Collections of Jordan D. Schnitzer and His Family Foundation." The exhibition was the largest retrospective print exhibition of Hockney's career, with more than 100 colourful prints, collages and photographic and iPad drawings, in a variety of media, spanning six decades of the artist's career.

From 9 April to 31 August 2025 Fondation Louis Vuitton hosted David Hockney 25, an exhibition with paintings in a variety of media created from 1955 to 2025, as well as immersive video.

== Personal life ==
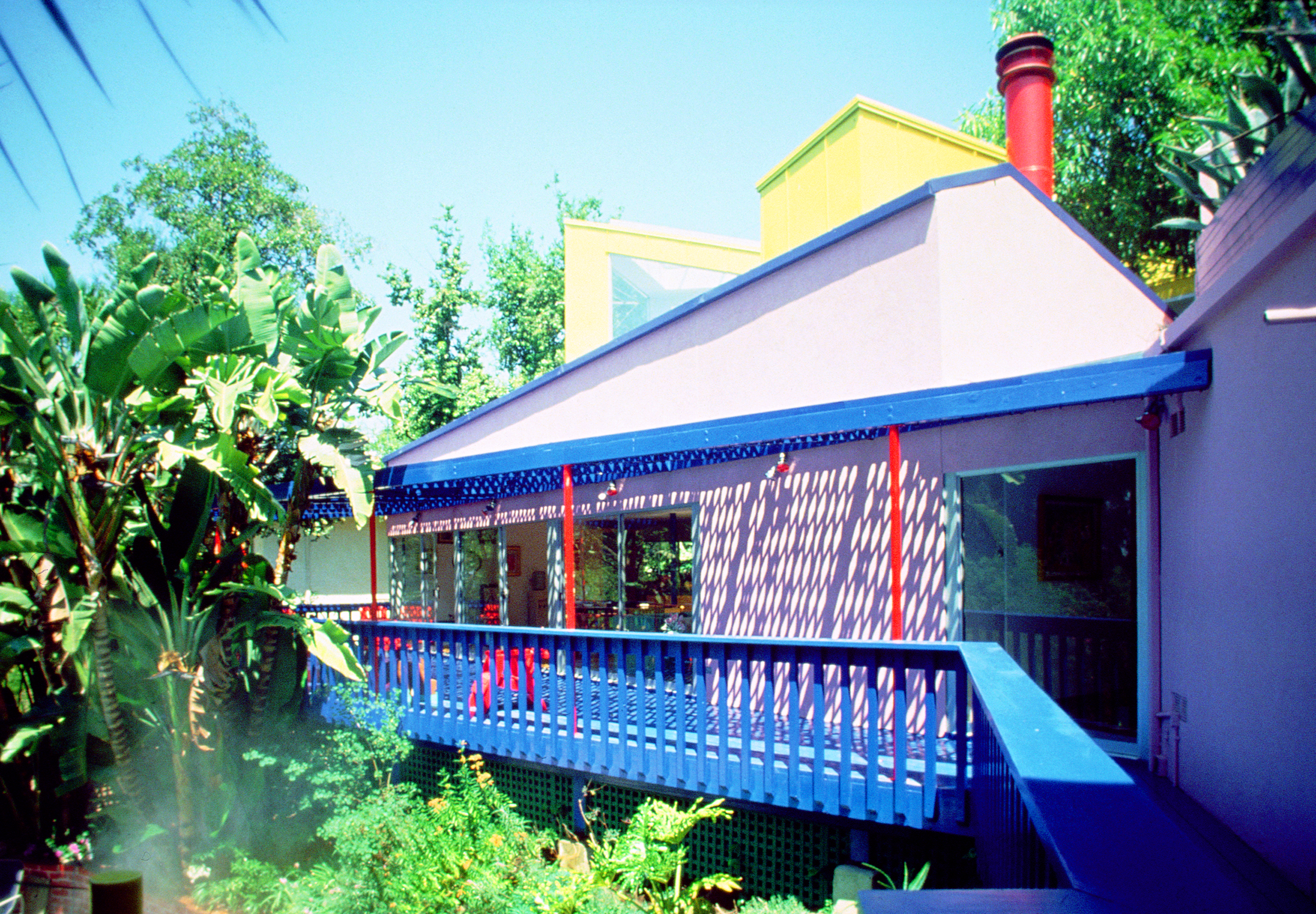
Hockney's residence in Los Angeles

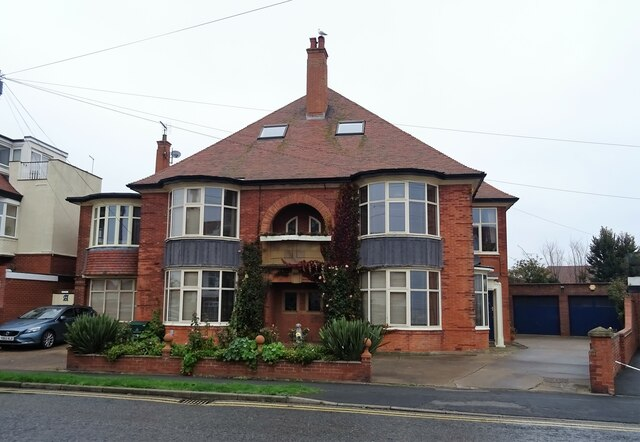
Hockney's former house on Kingston Road, Bridlington

=== Sexuality and relationships ===
Hockney came out as gay when he was 23, while studying at the Royal College of Art in London. Seven years later, homosexual acts between men over 21 were decriminalised in England and Wales with the Sexual Offences Act 1967. Hockney explored the nature of gay love in his work, such as in the painting We Two Boys Together Clinging (1961), named after a poem by Walt Whitman. In 1963 he painted two men together in the painting Domestic Scene, Los Angeles, one showering while the other washes his back.

In the summer of 1966, while teaching at UCLA, he met Peter Schlesinger, an art student who posed for paintings and drawings, and with whom he became romantically involved. Another of Hockney's romantic partners who was the subject of his work was Gregory Evans; the two met in 1971 and began a relationship in 1974. While no longer romantically involved, they still worked together, with Evans managing the David Hockney Studio.

Hockney had a relationship with artist and illustrator Ian Falconer, who was both his lover and his only formal student. Falconer later recalled that, beyond technical instruction, Hockney influenced his way of seeing and encouraged an appreciation of everyday subjects.

His longtime companion was Jean-Pierre Gonçalves de Lima, also known as JP, who worked with Hockney in his studio as his chief assistant.

=== Residences ===
Hockney owned residences and studios in Bridlington and London as well as two residences in California, where he lived intermittently since 1964: one in the Hollywood Hills and one in Malibu. He had an office and stored his archives on Santa Monica Boulevard in West Hollywood, California.

In March 2013 Hockney's 23-year-old assistant, Dominic Elliott, died after ingesting drain cleaner at Hockney's Bridlington studio; he had earlier taken drugs and alcohol. Hockney's partner drove him to Scarborough General Hospital, where he later died. An inquest returned a verdict of death by misadventure.

In November 2015 Hockney sold his house in Bridlington, ending his long association with the town. He then moved to Normandy, living in Rumesnil near Beuvron-en-Auge until 2023, before returning to Marylebone in London.

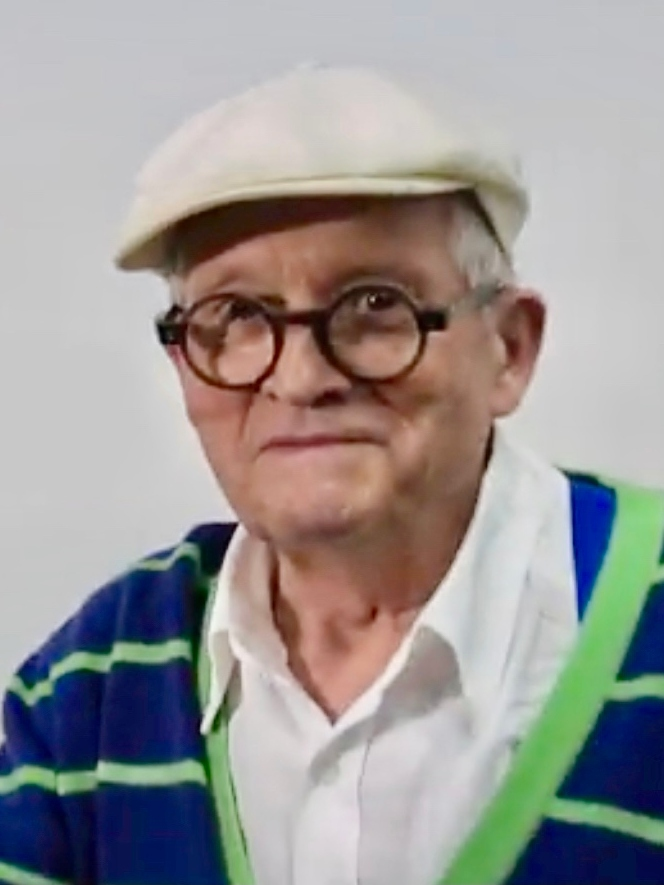
Hockney in 2017

=== Health ===
Hockney experienced hearing loss since the 1970s and used hearing aids since 1979, although he realised he was going deaf several years earlier. He also described having synaesthetic associations between sound, colour and shape.

Hockney maintained a daily swimming routine and reported being able to stand for extended periods while working at his easel.

=== Death and tributes ===
Hockney died at his home in London on 11 June 2026, aged 88. His funeral was held privately according to his wishes and attended only by his partner Jean‑Pierre Gonçalves de Lima and his great‑nephew Richard.

King Charles III paid tribute to Hockney, describing him as "a giant of the world of art and painting, a Yorkshireman through and through, and a dear friend and inspiration to so many". The artist Tracey Emin said "A great artist and a wonderful man, who with the power of art changed the perception of Britishness. A proud chain-smoking homosexual, who flew the flag higher than any other British artist." Prime Minister Keir Starmer also paid tribute, with a spokesman saying: "The prime minister is saddened to hear of the death of David Hockney, one of Britain's most celebrated artists."

== Public life and advocacy ==
Like his father, Hockney was a conscientious objector and worked as a medical orderly in hospitals during his National Service from 1957 to 1959. He was a founder of the Museum of Contemporary Art, Los Angeles, in 1979. Hockney was on the advisory board of the political magazine Standpoint; he contributed original sketches for its launch edition in June 2008, as well as agreeing to allow Standpoint to publish his previous views and pictures over the years.

He was a staunch pro-tobacco campaigner. In 2005 he fought to stop the ban on smoking in pubs and restaurants. At the Labour Party conference he held up a card saying "DEATH awaits you all even if you do not smoke". He was invited to guest-edit BBC Radio's Today programme on 29 December 2009 in which he aired his views on the subject. In 2013 he wrote a foreword and provided illustrations for a book by the psychologist J. E. R. Staddon, Unlucky Strike: Private Health and the Science, Law and Politics of Smoking.

In October 2010 he and a hundred other artists signed an open letter to the Secretary of State for Culture, Media and Sport, Jeremy Hunt, protesting against cutbacks in the arts.

== Collections ==
Many of Hockney's works are housed in the 1853 Gallery at Salts Mill in Saltaire, in his hometown of Bradford. Another large group of works are held by The David Hockney Foundation. His work is in numerous public and private collections worldwide, including:

- Art Institute of Chicago
- Louisiana Museum of Modern Art, Humlebæk, Denmark
- J. Paul Getty Museum, Los Angeles
- Los Angeles County Museum of Art
- Metropolitan Museum of Art, New York
- Centre Pompidou, Paris
- Hirshhorn Museum and Sculpture Garden, Washington, D.C.
- Smithsonian American Art Museum, Washington, D.C.
- Muscarelle Museum of Art, Williamsburg, Virginia

== Awards and honours ==
Hockney received numerous awards and distinctions recognising his contributions to painting, photography, and the visual arts including:

- 1967 – John Moores Painting Prize (Walker Art Gallery) for Peter Getting Out of Nick's Pool
- 1983 – Shakespeare Prize (Alfred Toepfer Foundation)
- 1988 – Progress Medal, Royal Photographic Society
- 1990 – Offered a knighthood (declined)
- 1993 – Award of Achievement, Archives of American Art, Los Angeles
- 1997 – Member of the Order of the Companions of Honour (CH)
- 1997 – Cultural Award, German Society for Photography (DGPh)
- 2003 – Special 150th Anniversary Medal and Honorary Fellowship, Royal Photographic Society
- 2003 – Lorenzo de' Medici Lifetime Career Award, Florence Biennale
- 2012 – Appointed to the Order of Merit (OM)

In 2012 Hockney was voted Britain's most influential artist in a poll of 1,000 British artists commissioned by The Other Art Fair. That year, he was among the British cultural icons selected by the artist Sir Peter Blake to appear in a new version of his most famous artwork – the Beatles' Sgt. Pepper's Lonely Hearts Club Band album cover – to celebrate the British cultural figures of his life that he most admired.

Hockney was also a Royal Academician, and an honorary member of the Printmakers Council.

As an important contributor to the pop art movement of the 1960s, he is considered one of the most influential British artists of the 20th and 21st centuries.

== Art market ==
On 21 June 2006 Hockney's painting The Splash sold for £2.6 million. It was offered for auction again on 11 February 2020, with an estimate of £20–30 million and sold, to an unknown buyer, for £23.1 million.

A Bigger Grand Canyon (1998), National Gallery of Australia

His A Bigger Grand Canyon, a series of 60 canvases that combined to produce one enormous picture, was bought by the National Gallery of Australia for $4.6 million.

Beverly Hills Housewife (1966–1967), a 12-foot-long acrylic that depicts the collector Betty Freeman standing by her pool in a long hot-pink dress, sold for $7.9 million at Christie's in New York in 2008, the top lot of the sale and a record price for a Hockney. This was topped in 2016 when his Woldgate Woods landscape made £9.4 million at auction. The record was broken again in 2018 with the sale of Piscine de Medianoche (Paper Pool 30) for $11.74 million and then doubled in the same Sotheby's auction when Pacific Coast Highway and Santa Monica sold for $28.5 million.

Portrait of an Artist (Pool with Two Figures) (1972), private collection

On 15 November 2018 Hockney's 1972 work Portrait of an Artist (Pool with Two Figures) sold at Christie's auction house in New York City for $90 million (£70 million), becoming the most expensive artwork by a living artist sold at auction. It broke the previous record which was set by the 2013 sale of Jeff Koons's Balloon Dog (Orange) for $58.4 million. Hockney held the record until 15 May 2019 when Koons reclaimed the honour by selling his Rabbit for more than $91 million at Christie's in New York.

In recent years, Hockney's iPad drawings have become the most successful segment of his print market. Since the initial release of the Arrival of Spring in Woldgate series, prices have increased from roughly £19,000 in 2014 up to the current auction record of £762,000 in 2025.

== The Hockney–Falco thesis ==
In the 2001 television programme and book Secret Knowledge, Hockney posited that the Old Masters used camera obscura as well as camera lucida and lens techniques that projected the image of the subject onto the surface of the painting. Hockney argued that this technique migrated gradually from Northern Europe to Italy, and is the reason for the photographic style of painting seen in the Renaissance and later periods of art. He published his conclusions in the 2001 book Secret Knowledge: Rediscovering the Lost Techniques of the Old Masters, which was revised in 2006.

== Appearances in other media ==
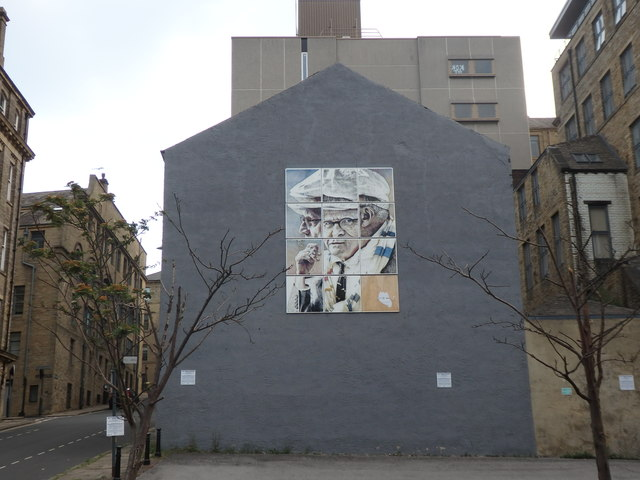
David Hockney Collage, by Marcus Levine (2018), Chapel Street, Bradford, to commemorate his 80th year

In 1966, while working on a series of etchings based on love poems by the Greek poet Constantine P. Cavafy, Hockney starred in a documentary by the filmmaker James Scott, entitled Love's Presentation. He was the subject of Jack Hazan's 1974 biopic, A Bigger Splash, named after Hockney's 1967 pool painting of the same name. Hockney was also the inspiration of artist Billy Pappas in the documentary film Waiting for Hockney (2008), which debuted at the Tribeca Film Festival in 2008.

Hockney was inducted into Vanity Fair's International Best-Dressed Hall of Fame in 1986. In 2005 Burberry creative director Christopher Bailey centred his entire spring/summer menswear collection around the artist and in 2012, fashion designer Vivienne Westwood, a close friend, named a checked jacket after Hockney. In 2011 British GQ named him one of the 50 Most Stylish Men in Britain and in March 2013, he was listed as one of the Fifty Best-dressed Over-50s by The Guardian.

Hockney was commissioned to design the cover and pages for the December 1985 issue of the French edition of Vogue. Consistent with his interest in cubism and admiration for Pablo Picasso, Hockney chose to paint Celia Birtwell (who appears in several of his works) from different views for the cover, as if the eye had scanned her face diagonally. David Hockney: A Rake's Progress (2012) is a biography of Hockney covering the years 1937 to 1975, by writer and photographer Christopher Simon Sykes.

In 2012 Hockney featured in BBC Radio 4's list of The New Elizabethans to mark the diamond Jubilee of Queen Elizabeth II. A panel of seven academics, journalists and historians named Hockney among the group of people in the UK "whose actions during the reign of Elizabeth II have had a significant impact on lives in these islands and given the age its character". The 2015 Luca Guadagnino's film A Bigger Splash was named after Hockney's painting.

Between 2011 and 2019 David Hockney gave numorous interviews for the Louisiana Channel, the digital platform of Louisiana Museum of Modern Art. The last interview they did, was in 2019 at Hockneys home in Normandie. Here he shared an anecdote on how his drawing, 'Do Remember They Can't Cancel the Spring' (2020) came about: A philosopher in a news program was asked how he could be optimistic with the current news: "And he said: Well, that's television. Bad news sells" The reporter then inquired what the good news was, to which the philosopher responded: "Well, the arrival of spring."

== David Hockney Foundation ==
The David Hockney Foundation – both the UK registered charity 1127262 and the US 501(c)(3) private operating foundation – was created by the artist in 2008. In 2012, Hockney, worth an estimated $55.2 million (approx. £36.1 m), transferred paintings valued at $124.2 million (approx. £81.5 m) to the foundation, and gave an additional $1.2 million (approx. £0.79 m) in cash to help fund its operations.

The foundation's mission is to advance appreciation and understanding of visual art and culture through the exhibition, preservation, and publication of Hockney's work. Richard Benefield, who organised David Hockney: A Bigger Exhibition from 2013 to 2014 at the de Young Museum in San Francisco, became the first executive director in January 2017.

The foundation owns over 8,000 works – paintings, drawings, watercolours, complete editioned prints, stage design, multi-camera movies, and other media. They also hold 203 sketchbooks and Hockney's personal photo albums from 1961 to 1990. The foundation manages various loans to museums and exhibitions around the world, including Happy Birthday, Mr. Hockney! at the J. Paul Getty Museum celebrating his 80th birthday, and the retrospective exhibitions from 2017 to 2018 at the Metropolitan Museum, Centre Georges Pompidou and Tate Britain.

== Books ==
=== By Hockney ===
- — (1971). 72 Drawings. London: Jonathan Cape. ISBN 0-224-00655-X.
- — (1976). David Hockney. London: Thames & Hudson. ISBN 0-500-09108-0.
- — (1977). Blue Guitar: Etchings by David Hockney Who Was Inspired by Wallace Stevens Who Was Inspired by Pablo Picasso. New York: Petersburg Press. ISBN 0-902825-03-8.
- — (1978). Travels with Pen, Pencil and Ink. New York: Petersburg Press. ISBN 0-902825-07-0.
- — (1979). Stangos, Nikos (ed.). Pictures by David Hockney. London: Thames & Hudson. ISBN 0-500-27163-1.
- — (1980). Travels with Pen, Pencil and Ink. London: Tate Gallery. ISBN 0-905005-58-9.
- — (1981). Looking at Pictures in a Book at the National Gallery (The artist's eye). London: National Gallery.
- — (1982). Photographs. New York: Petersburg Press. ISBN 0-902825-15-1.
- — (1983). Hockney's Photographs. London: Arts Council of Great Britain. ISBN 0-7287-0382-3.
- —; Stangos, Nikos (1985). Martha's Vineyard and other places: My Third Sketchbook from the Summer of 1982. London: Thames and Hudson. ISBN 0-500-23446-9.
- — (1987). David Hockney: Faces 1966–1984. London: Thames & Hudson. ISBN 0-500-27464-9.
- —; Stangos, Nikos (1989). That's the Way I See It. London: Thames and Hudson. ISBN 0-500-28085-1.
- —; Spender, Stephen (1991). Hockney's Alphabet. London: Random House. ISBN 0-679-41066-X.
- — (1993). David Hockney: Some Very New Paintings. William Hardie (Introduction). Glasgow: William Hardie Gallery. ISBN 1-872878-03-2.
- — (1994). Off the Wall: A Collection of David Hockney's Posters 1987–94. Brian Baggott. Pavilion Books. ISBN 1-85793-421-0.
- — (1995). David Hockney: Poster Art. Chronicle Books. ISBN 0-8118-0915-3.
- — (1999). Picasso. Galerie Lelong. ISBN 2-86882-026-3.
- — (1999). Une éducation artistique. Galerie Lelong. ISBN 2-86882-028-X.
- — (2001). Hockney's Pictures. London: Thames & Hudson. ISBN 0-500-28671-X.
- — (2006). Secret Knowledge: Rediscovering the lost techniques of the Old Masters (Expanded ed.). Thames & Hudson; Viking Studio.
- — (2008). Hockney on Art: Conversations with Paul Joyce. Paul Joyce. New York: Little, Brown and Company. ISBN 978-1-4087-0157-7.
- — (2011). David Hockney's Dog Days. London: Thames & Hudson. ISBN 978-0-500-28627-2.
- — (2011). A Yorkshire Sketchbook. London: Royal Academy of Arts. ISBN 978-1-907533-23-5.
- — (2012). David Hockney: A Bigger Picture. London: Thames & Hudson. ISBN 978-0-500-09366-5.
- — (2013). David Hockney: A Bigger Exhibition. Fine Arts Museums of San Francisco and Del Monico with Prestel. ISBN 978-3-7913-5334-0.
- — (2016). A History of Pictures. Martin Gayford. London: Thames & Hudson. ISBN 978-0-500-23949-0.
- — (2021). Spring Cannot be Cancelled: David Hockney in Normandy. Martin Gayford. London: Thames & Hudson. ISBN 978-0-500-09436-5.
- — (2022). David Hockney: Moving Focus. Texts by Catherine Cusset, Rineke Dijkstra, Fanni Fetzer, Frank Gehry, Jann Haworth, Allen Jones, Owen Jones, Helen Little, David Oxtoby, Eddie Peake, Andrew McMillan, Richard Morphet, Walter Pfeiffer, Christina Quarles, Bruno Ravella, Marieke Lucas Rijneveld, Ed Ruscha, Gregory Salter, Yinka Shonibare, Wayne Sleep, Ali Smith, Christine Streuli, Russell Tovey. Lucerne, London: Kunstmuseum Luzern, Tate Publishing. ISBN 978-1-84976-792-7.

In October 2016 Taschen published David Hockney: A Bigger Book, costing £1,750 (£3,500 with an added loose print). The artist curated the selection of more than 60 years of his work reproduced within 498 pages. The book, weighing 78 lbs, had gone through 19 proof stages. The book came with an (optional) substantial wooden lectern. He unveiled the book at the Frankfurt Book Fair where he was the keynote speaker at the opening press conference. ISBN 978-3-8365-0787-5

=== Contributions by Hockney ===
- Stanton, Larry (1986). Larry Stanton Painting and Drawing. Twelvetrees Press. ISBN 978-0-942642-29-2.
