= Stefan Edlis =

Austrian-American art collector

Stefan Edlis (June 12, 1925 in Vienna, Austria – October 15, 2019) was an Austrian-born American art collector and philanthropist. As a collector he initially focused on Pop Art.

== Biography ==
Edlis escaped Nazi Reich annexed Austria with his mother and two siblings in 1941 and emigrated to the United States, arriving in New York. He was later drafted into the U.S. Navy and stationed in Iwo Jima where he buried Japanese prisoners.

Edlis founded Apollo Plastics in 1965 and initially only collected art made from plastic. He later found out that art dealers told artists to create works in plastics because "Stefan would buy it".

In 1977 Edlis began his foray into forming a major collection with his purchase of Piet Mondrian’s Large Composition With Red, Blue, and Yellow. He then proceeded over the next four plus decades with his wife and collecting partner Gael Neeson to create a major collection of Pop Art and other closely associated art genres. Among the works in his collection were Roy Lichtenstein's 1966 painting Oh, Jeff...I Love You, Too...But..., Jeff Koons's Rabbit (created in edition of 3 - one of which sold at auction for $91.1 million US setting a new all time price record for a work by a living artist) as well as works by Andy Warhol, Jasper Johns, Cy Twombly, Maurizio Cattelan, Gerhard Richter, Cindy Sherman, and Richard Prince.

In 2015 Edlis and Neeson donated more than 40 works to the Art Institute of Chicago. With an estimated value of $400 million, it is the largest bequest in the museum's history. The museum in turn agreed to exhibit the collection for at least the next fifty years. In 2000 Edlis and Neeson made a partial gift of their Jeff Koons's Rabbit to the Museum of Contemporary Art, Chicago.

In 2018 Edlis appeared in Nathaniel Kahn's HBO art market documentary The Price of Everything and delivered a quote from the Oscar Wilde play Lady Windermere's Fan which became the title of the film: "There are a lot of people who know the price of everything and the value of nothing."

== Personal life ==
Edlis was married twice. Edlis and his second wife Gael Neeson, whom he married in the 1970s, pursued their passion for art together and had homes in Chicago and Aspen, Colorado.
