= Sacha Jafri =

Anglo-Pakistani artist (born 1977)

- Education: Eton College; Oxford University
- Known for: Painting
- Notable work: Journey of Humanity (2020)
- Website: sachajafri.com

Sacha Jafri (born 3 January 1977 in United Kingdom) is a British artist known for creating the world's largest art canvas, Journey of Humanity, over seven months in 2020 during the COVID-19 pandemic in Dubai. This record was surpassed by the 14-year-old Nigerian artist Kanyeyachukwu Tagbo-Okeke in 2025.

In 2021, Journey of Humanity reportedly sold for US$62 million, which would make it the third highest price ever paid for a work of art by a living artist. However, a 2026 article published in The Fence magazine claims that the painting remains unpaid, and its current location remains unknown.

== Early life ==
Sacha Jafri was born in England and is descended from the lineage of the Nawab of Awadh. His mother is of French descent and his father was a diplomat who served as Pakistan's ambassador to the Vatican. His grandfather Fareed S. Jafri was appointed editor of Dawn newspaper by Muhammad Ali Jinnah in the 1950s, and was later appointed Pakistan's High Commissioner to Nigeria in 1968.

He was raised in Virginia Water, near Windsor Great Park. He enrolled at Oxford University's Ruskin School of Art in 1996. In 2000, he obtained his master's degree in Fine Arts from Oxford University. Some sources claim that Jafri earned a first class honours Master of Arts, but two contemporaries say he received a third class degree.

== Career ==
Jafri generally works outside the art gallery system, donates many of his works and or proceeds from them to charity efforts, and some sources list his collectors as Barack Obama, members of the British royal family, Sir Richard Branson, Paul McCartney, Leonardo DiCaprio, Bill Gates, Madonna, David Beckham, George Clooney and Eva Longoria. However, there is no evidence that Jafri's paintings have been purchased by Gates, DiCaprio, or Obama.

Jafri claims that he exhibited a show called New Sensations at the Saatchi Gallery in 2002. Charles Saatchi has stated that he does not know Jafri. Jafri has also claimed to have been present during the making of Sand and Sorrow, a documentary which covered the Darfur genocide in 2005; this has been denied by the film's director, Paul Freedman. In the late 2000s, Jafri moved to Dubai.

Prince Charles commissioned Jafri to do portraits of the "14 most influential living Muslims" for his Mosaic initiative. He has also been appointed a resident artist by the 21st Century leaders charity. In 2014, he created the cover art for Silver Rails, the final studio album by musician Jack Bruce.

=== Journey of Humanity ===
In 2021, Jafri's Journey of Humanity canvas reportedly sold at auction in Dubai for 228 million Dirham ($62 million US), the third highest auction price ever paid for a work of art by a living artist, behind Jeff Koons's Rabbit ($91.1 million US), and David Hockney's Portrait of an Artist (Pool with Two Figures) ($90 million US). The painting measures over 17,000 sq ft (1,600 m^{2}) and incorporates the artwork of children from more than 140 nations. The artwork's reported purchaser was French crypto businessman André Abdoune.

A 2026 article in the British magazine The Fence claims that the $62 million, agreed to be paid by Abdoune in four instalments over a four month period, was not paid (as of March 2026). Jafri has not publicly confirmed that the painting remains unpaid.
