= Alvin Pettit =

American public artist and sculptor

- Born: Alvin Dwight Pettit Jr.
- Education: School of Visual Arts
- Known for: Sculpting, public art, painting, illustration
- Parents: A. Dwight Pettit (father); Bobbie Nell Moore-Pettit (mother)
- Website: www.alvinpettit.com

Alvin Pettit is a contemporary painter and sculptor based in New Jersey. Pettit is best known for his outdoor sculptures of prominent African-American figures, such as Harriet Tubman and Mary McLeod Bethune.

== Early life ==
Pettit was raised in Baltimore, Maryland by a family immersed in the art world. His father and grandfather were both hobbyist painters, his great uncle taught art and his great grandmother was an expert quilt-maker.

Pettit graduated high school from the Baltimore School for the Arts in 1988 and earned is BFA from the School of Visual Arts in 1992, where he studied illustration under the cartoonist Will Eisner.

In 1994, Pettit was hired by Jeff Koons as an assistant sculptor. While working with Koons, Pettit helped fabricate some of Koons' "Balloon Dog" sculptures.

== Work ==
Throughout his career and across media, Pettit has used art as a tool for social change.

=== Sculpture and public art ===
In 2020, Pettit created the official Jersey City Black Lives Matter asphalt mural, which included portraits of activist Angela Davis and former National Football League player Colin Kaepernick. With the help of eight other artists and volunteers, the mural took two weeks to complete and all of the materials needed for the creation of the mural were donated by the city. In 2021, he sculpted a nine-foot bronze sculpture of educator and philanthropist Mary McLeod Bethune for Jersey City.

Pettit was selected in 2024 by the Hoboken City Council to sculpt a statue of LGBTQ icon, Marsha P. Johnson at Stevens Park.

Pettit is a 2025 finalist to design a monument of civil rights activist Sadie Alexander in Philadelphia.

=== Harriet Tubman, A Higher Power: The Call of a Freedom Fighter ===
In 2022, the City of Philadelphia invited artist Wesley Wofford to design a commemorative public statue of Harriet Tubman to stand outside of City Hall. This decision received significant backlash from the community as Wofford was awarded the commission without input from the public, and because of his positionality as a white male artist honoring a black, female historic figure. The city responded by opening up the selection process to the public and, in 2023, selected Pettit out of fifty nationally competing artists to create their official permanent monument of Tubman to stand in front of City Hall. The 14 foot bronze sculpture, scheduled to be completed in 2025, will be the first public work of art dedicated to an African-American woman in Philadelphia's public art collection. Pettit, along with the other four semi-finalists, met with the public to share his design before the community offered its input regarding the final selection to a selection committee, which included descendants of Tubman. Tubman is most often depicted leading enslaved people to freedom; however, in Pettit's version, she is shown as a Civil War soldier and leader, a role the artist says has received little attention. In his design, entitled A Higher Power: The Call of a Freedom Fighter, Pettit portrays Tubman with her hands clasped in prayer and weapons strapped on her body, referencing her role as a military commander leading 150 Black Union soldiers on the Combahee Ferry Raid in South Carolina in 1863. Tubman's pose in Pettit's design draws inspiration from Arnold Friberg's painting, The Prayer at Valley Forge, 1975, which illustrates George Washington during the American Revolutionary War praying in the woods.

=== Community leadership ===
In 2013, Pettit became the program director of the Mary McLeod Bethune Life Center in Jersey City, the largest municipally owned and operated community facility in the city. Significantly, the Bethune Center has become the most prominent venue for creative activities within the predominately African-American community in which it is situated.

Pettit currently serves on the board of the Jersey City Arts Council, the Jersey City Artist Certification Board and the Jersey City Public Art Advisory Board.

=== Curation ===
In 2017, Pettit curated an exhibition at County College of Morris Art and Design entitled Black Art Matters.
