= Racing Thoughts (Jasper Johns) =

Pair of paintings by Jasper Johns

- Year: 1983
- Medium: Encaustic, screenprint, and wax crayon on collaged cotton and linen
- Dimensions: 122.1 cm × 191 cm (48.1 in × 75 in)
- Location: Whitney Museum of American Art, New York
- Accession: 84.6
- Website: https://whitney.org/collection/works/165

Racing Thoughts
- Year: 1984
- Medium: Oil on canvas
- Dimensions: 127 cm × 190.5 cm (50 in × 75.0 in)
- Owner: The Robert and Jane Meyerhoff Collection

Racing Thoughts is a pair of paintings of the same title by the American artist Jasper Johns, made in 1983 and 1984. The first, a brightly colored composition in encaustic, screenprint, and wax crayon on collaged cotton and linen, is in the collection of the Whitney Museum of American Art in New York. The second, painted in oil on canvas in 1984, reprises the same composition in grisaille and is held privately.

Both are said to depict the interior of Johns's bathroom at his home in Stony Point, New York, crowded with reproductions, personal objects, and art-historical references—among them Leonardo da Vinci's Mona Lisa, a hidden figure from Matthias Grünewald's Isenheim Altarpiece, a Barnett Newman print, and a Swiss avalanche-warning sign. Several of the iconographic elements in Racing Thoughts recur across Johns's works of the 1980s. The title refers to the rapid, disconnected succession of images Johns experienced while trying to sleep, a phenomenon a psychologist identified to him as "racing thoughts."

Scholars have read the paintings as a meditation on mortality and the futility of artistic achievement, and critics have interpreted the crowded, unstable composition variously as a reflection on artistic ambition, a meditation on disappearance and history, and a fragmented self-portrait. The 1983 version of Racing Thoughts was acquired by the Whitney Museum in 1984 and exhibited at the 1985 Whitney Biennial. The critic Peter Schjeldahl described it as Johns's "tour de force".

== Background ==
Jasper Johns rose to prominence in the late 1950s with encaustic paintings of flags, targets, numbers, and other familiar symbols, work that challenged the gestural individualism of Abstract Expressionism and posed questions about the nature of representation. His first solo exhibition, held at the Leo Castelli Gallery in 1958, was a critical and commercial success, and Castelli remained Johns's dealer for the rest of the artist's career.

From 1973 to 1987, Johns maintained a 1930s farmhouse with a glass-walled studio in Stony Point, New York; the bathroom of this house provided the setting for the Racing Thoughts paintings and the related "bathtub" works of the mid-1980s. The early 1980s saw Johns increasingly drawing on art-historical sources and autobiographical reference, borrowing motifs from earlier artists—including the German Renaissance painter Matthias Grünewald alongside the Italian Renaissance painters Michelangelo and Leonardo—as well as recurring themes of mortality and the passage of time.

== Analysis ==
=== Description and technique ===
Both paintings are based on the same set of iconographic references and use the same compositional structure, split into two vertical halves. The left half of each work features a dense matrix of fractured crosshatching resembling a door, over which the demon's image merges with patterns of stripes and wood graining. Layered over the center is a pale yellow silhouette tracing an elongated form. A black-and-white jigsaw puzzle made from a photograph of Johns's art dealer, Leo Castelli, as a young man is affixed to the upper left. Along the lower left are stenciled, partly obscured words.

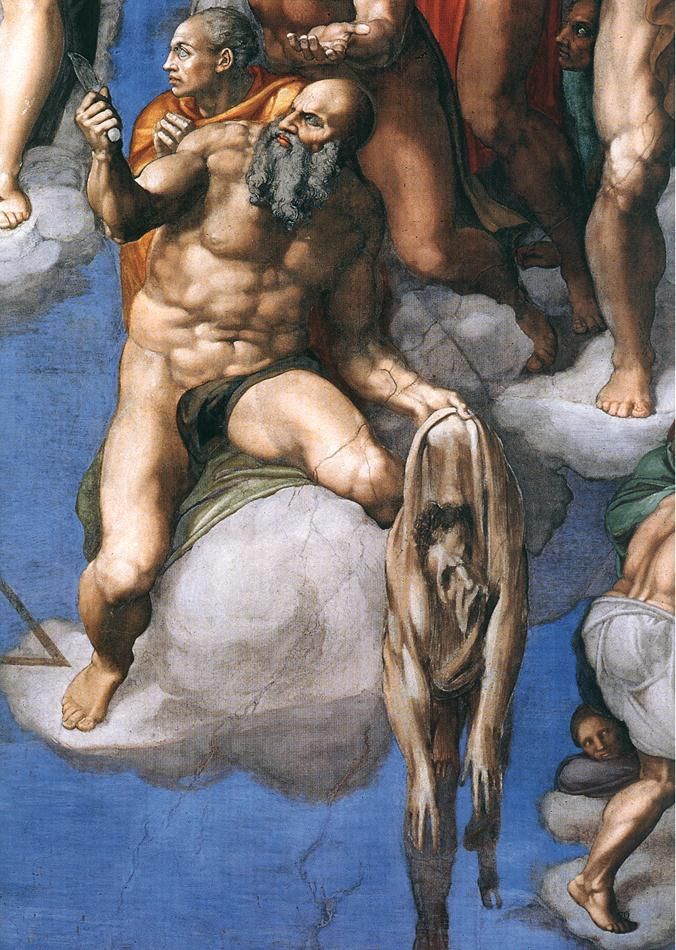
Saint Bartholomew in the Last Judgment displaying his flayed skin echoed in the drooping tan form in Johns's work.

The art dealer Leo Castelli (seated), whose portrait is featured in Racing Thoughts, and Jasper Johns, c. 1970s.

The right half shows trompe l'œil tape and nails, a reproduction of Leonardo da Vinci's Mona Lisa, and a 1961 lithograph by Barnett Newman. Below them, a dark wood-grained shelf holds a George E. Ohr pot and a porcelain vase made for the Silver Jubilee of Elizabeth II. At the far right, white skull and crossbones are depicted above another set of stenciled words in French and German, and a white-and-silver three-handle faucet assembly sits at the base of the wall. The 1983 version is polychromatic and incorporates the collage technique, while the 1984 work is in grisaille and made using only oil paint on canvas.

=== Interpretation and scholarship ===
The title originates from an experience Johns had while staying on the Caribbean island of Saint Martin, where images repeatedly raced through his mind as he tried to sleep; a child psychiatrist staying at the same hotel told him the term for the phenomenon was "racing thoughts". As with many other works by Johns, the artist purposefully represented objects that carry multiple meanings. Both paintings are said to depict the interior of Johns's bathroom at his Stony Point, New York, home, seen from the vantage of the bathtub; the faucets, hamper, vases, and wooden door are all features of that room. The Mona Lisa print has been interpreted as an homage to not only Leonardo, but also Marcel Duchamp, Andy Warhol, and as a maternal archetype.

At the far right, a skull-and-crossbones above the German and French words "GLETSCHERABBRUCH" and "CHUTE DE GLACE" reproduce a Swiss avalanche-warning sign, contributing to what art historians have read as the work's preoccupation with mortality. Hidden in the door pattern on the left-hand side of each composition is a tracing of the demon from the Temptation of Saint Anthony panel in Matthias Grünewald’s Isenheim Altarpiece (1512–1516), a figure whose diseased skin Johns connects to his broader association of the painted surface with the body. A drooping tan form, identified as a pair of Johns's trousers hanging from the bathroom door, reappears in other works by Johns from the 1980s. It has been described by the American curator and scholar Kirk Varnedoe as "a melancholy, hollow husk of the self" echoing Michelangelo's self-portrait as the flayed skin of Saint Bartholomew in the Last Judgment.

The arrangement of these images produces a deliberate uncertainty as to whether they hang on a wall, are reflected in a mirror, or pass through the artist's mind as a stream of thought. Critics have read the iconography of Racing Thoughts in varied terms. John Russell placed it within "the great 20th-century tradition of the artist's interior" and saw it as a reflection on artistic ambition and the loneliness of making art. Barbara Rose described it as a meditation on disappearance, particularly the lost youth of Johns's dealer Leo Castelli, allusions to the Old Masters, and, in the profiles of Queen Elizabeth II and Prince Philip formed by the porcelain vase, the passing of an older social order. Mark Rosenthal found a "doubleness of identity, appearance and meaning" in nearly every object, reading the work as a Cubist self-portrait in which the jigsaw puzzle serves as a model for the fragmentation of the whole. According to the art historian Esther Levinger, Racing Thoughts is an "allegory of vanity" and a play on "the absurdity and futility of the artist's occupation or any achievement", continuing a theme from earlier works such as Fool's House and Pinion.

== Sources ==
- Armstrong, Richard; Hanhardt, John G.; Haskell, Barbara; Marshall, Richard; Phillips, Lisa; Sims, Patterson (1985). 1985 Biennial Exhibition. New York: Whitney Museum of American Art.
- Basualdo, Carlos; Rothkopf, Scott (2021). Jasper Johns: Mind/Mirror. Philadelphia and New York: Philadelphia Museum of Art and Whitney Museum of American Art. ISBN 978-0-300-25425-9.
- Bernstein, Roberta (1996). "Seeing a Thing Can Sometimes Trigger the Mind to Make Another Thing". In Varnedoe, Kirk (ed.). Jasper Johns: A Retrospective. New York: The Museum of Modern Art. pp. 39–91. ISBN 978-0-87070-388-1.
- Bernstein, Roberta (2016). Jasper Johns Catalogue Raisonné of Painting and Sculpture, Volume 5. Wildenstein Plattner Institute. ISBN 978-0-300-22742-0.
- Carpenter, B. Stephen; Taylor, Pamela G. (2003). "Racing Thoughts: Altering Our Ways of Knowing and Being in Art Through Computer Hypertext". Studies in Art Education. 45 (1): 40–55. ISSN 0039-3541.
- Crichton, Michael (1994). Jasper Johns. New York: Harry N. Abrams, Inc., Publishers in association with the Whitney Museum of American Art. ISBN 978-0-8109-3515-0.
- Levinger, Esther (1989-04-01). "Jasper Johns' Painted Words". Visible Language. XXIII (2–3): 280–295.
- Mackus, Sandra (2024). "The Passage of Time: Jasper Johns's The Seasons (1985–86) and 5 Postcards (2011)". In Gieskes, Mette; Roza, Mathilde (eds.). Retrospection and Revision in Modern and Contemporary Art, Literature and Music. Cham: Palgrave Macmillan. pp. 251–274. doi:10.1007/978-3-031-39598-7_14. ISBN 978-3-031-39597-0.
- Ravenal, John B. (2024-10-16). "Hidden in Plain Sight: New Discoveries in the Art of Jasper Johns". Gagosian Quarterly.
- Rose, Barbara (2017-09-06). "Jasper Johns: 'Take an object. Do something to it. Do something else to it.'". RA Magazine.
- Schjeldahl, Peter (2021-10-04). "Jasper Johns Remains Contemporary Art's Philosopher King". The New Yorker. ISSN 0028-792X.
- Varnedoe, Kirk (1996). "Introduction: A Sense of Life". In Varnedoe, Kirk (ed.). Jasper Johns: A Retrospective. New York: The Museum of Modern Art. ISBN 978-0-87070-388-1.
- Welish, Marjorie (Fall 1996). "Jasper Johns by Marjorie Welish". BOMB. No. 57.
