= Flag (painting) =

Painting by Jasper Johns

- Artist: Jasper Johns
- Year: 1954-1955
- Medium: Encaustic, oil and collage on fabric mounted on plywood
- Dimensions: 107.3 cm × 153.8 cm (42.2 in × 60.6 in)
- Location: Museum of Modern Art, New York

Detail of Flag (1954–55). Museum of Modern Art, New York. This image illustrates Johns's early technique of painting with thick, dripping encaustic over a collage made from found materials such as newspaper. This rough method of construction is rarely visible in photographic reproductions of his work.

Flag is an encaustic painting by the American artist Jasper Johns. It was created in 1954–1955, when Johns was 24, two years after he was discharged from the U.S. Army. This painting was the first of many works that Johns made, as he said, that were inspired by a dream of the U.S. flag in 1954. It is one of the paintings for which Johns is best known. It is held in the Museum of Modern Art, in New York.

The painting was featured in the 1980 BBC Two series 100 Great Paintings.

== Description ==
The work measures 42.2 inches (107.3 cm) by 60.6 inches (153.8 cm). It is made using encaustic, oil paint, and newsprint collage on three separate canvases, mounted on a plywood board. The painting reflects the three colors of the U.S. flag: red, white and blue; the flag is depicted in the form that it took between 1912 and 1959, with 48 white stars on a blue canton representing the then-48 U.S. states (excluding Alaska and Hawaii), and with thirteen red and white stripes. Newsprint is visible under the stripes. Reading the texts, it is clear that the newsprint was not selected at random: Johns steered clear of headlines, or national or political news, and used inconsequential articles or adverts. The painting has a rough-textured surface, and the 48 stars are not identical. It is dated 1954 on its reverse.

== Flag series ==
Johns made over 40 works based on the U.S. flag, including the large and monochrome White Flag in 1955, and his 1958 work Three Flags, with three superimposed flags showing a total of 84 stars.

His 48-star Flag from 1958 was purchased in 2010 by hedge-fund manager Steven A. Cohen for an estimated $110 million, making it the most expensive work sold by a living artist as of 2023.

In November 2014, the encaustic Flag (1983) was auctioned off for $36 million at Sotheby's in New York City.
