= List of most expensive artworks by living artists =

The highest known price paid for an artwork by a living artist was for Jasper Johns's 1958 painting Flag. Its 2010 private sale price was estimated to be about US$110 million ($162 million in 2025 dollars).

== All-time ==
This is a list of highest prices ever paid—at auction or private sale—for an artwork by an artist living at time of sale.

| Adjusted price (in millions of USD) | Original price (in millions of USD) | Work | Artist | Date | Venue | Ref. |
|---|---|---|---|---|---|---|
| 162 | 110 | Flag | Jasper Johns | 2010 | Private sale | |
| 115 | 91.1 | Rabbit | Jeff Koons | May 2019 | Christie's | |
| 116 | 90.3 | Portrait of an Artist (Pool with Two Figures) | David Hockney | November 2018 | Christie's | |
| 128 | 80 | False Start | Jasper Johns | October 2006 | Private sale | |
| 82 | 69.3 | Everydays: the First 5000 Days | Beeple | March 2021 | Christie's | |
| 70 | 68.3 | Standard Station, Ten-Cent Western Being Torn in Half | Ed Ruscha | November 2024 | Christie's | |
| 62 | 62 | The Journey of Humanity | Sacha Jafri | March 2021 | Humanity Inspired Royal Charity Auction, Dubai (Note: The auction was organized in partnership with UNICEF, UNESCO, Ministry of Education of the United Arab Emirates, and the Global Gift Foundation.) | |
| 81 | 58.4 | Balloon Dog (Orange) | Jeff Koons | November 2013 | Christie's | |

== Progressive auction sales records ==
This is a list of progressive records of the highest price ever paid at auction for the work of an artist who was living at time of sale. As a progressive record listing, it only lists auctions records that topple the previous best. The current record price is US$91 million for Jeff Koons's 1986 sculpture, Rabbit, set in 2019. The current record price for a painting is $90 million for David Hockney's 1972 Portrait of an Artist (Pool with Two Figures), set the prior year.

| Adjusted price (in millions of USD) | Original price (in millions of USD) | Work | Artist | Date | Auction house | Ref. |
|---|---|---|---|---|---|---|
| 91.82 | 91.1 | Rabbit | Jeff Koons | May 2019 | Christie's | |
| 92.48 | 90.3 | Portrait of an Artist (Pool with Two Figures) | David Hockney | November 2018 | Christie's | |
| 64.68 | 58.4 | Balloon Dog (Orange) | Jeff Koons | November 2013 | Christie's | |
| 41.11 | 37.1 | Domplatz, Mailand | Gerhard Richter | May 2013 | Sotheby's | |
| 38.16 | 34.2 | Abstraktes Bild (809-4) (1994) | Gerhard Richter | October 2012 | Sotheby's | |
| 40.03 | 33.6 | Benefits Supervisor Sleeping | Lucian Freud | May 2008 | Christie's | |
| 28.98 | 23.6 | Hanging Heart (Magenta/Gold) | Jeff Koons | November 2007 | Sotheby's | |
| 23.91 | 19.3 | Lullaby Spring | Damien Hirst | June 2007 | Sotheby's | |
| 36.48 | 17 | False Start | Jasper Johns | November 1988 | Sotheby's | |
| 15.02 | 7 | White Flag | Jasper Johns | November 1988 | Christie's | |
| 9.18 | 4.18 | Diver | Jasper Johns | May 1988 | Christie's | |
| 8.28 | 3.63 (tied) | Pink Lady | Willem de Kooning | May 1987 | Sotheby's | |
| 8.49 | 3.63 (tied) | Out the Window | Jasper Johns | November 1986 | Sotheby's | |
| 3.23 | 1.2 | Two Women | Willem de Kooning | May 1982 | Christie's | |
| 2.19 | 0.8 | L'Enigme du Desir/Ma Mere, Ma Mere, Ma Mere | Salvador Dalí | March 1982 | Christie's | |
| 4.13 | 0.53 | Mother and Child | Pablo Picasso | April 1967 | Sotheby's | |
| 1.88 | 0.22 | Death of Harlequin/Woman in a Garden | Pablo Picasso | 1962 | Sotheby's | |
| 1.34 | 0.15 (tied) | La Belle Hollandaise | Pablo Picasso | May 1959 | Sotheby's | |
| 1.34 | 0.15 (tied) | Mother and Child | Pablo Picasso | November 1958 | Sotheby's | |
| | 0.066 | Friedland, 1807 | Ernest Meissonier | March 1887 | Stewart estate sale | |
| | 0.045 | Les Communiantes | Jules Breton | May 1886 | Mary J. Morgan estate sale | |

== Private sales ==
- Jasper Johns's 1958 Flag painting was sold by Steven A. Cohen to Jean-Christophe Castelli for ca $110 million in 2010 ($162 million in 2025 dollars).
- Damien Hirst's For the Love of God (2007), composed of diamond and platinum, was privately acquired by a consortium, which included the artist himself, in August 2007 for $100 million – equivalent to approximately $141 million when adjusted for inflation to 2022 values.
- Another Jasper Johns painting, False Start (1959), was sold by Kenneth C. Griffin to David Geffen on October 12, 2006, for a then record $80 million.($128 million in 2025 dollars)
- The Whitney Museum of American Art privately purchased Jasper Johns's Three Flags in 1980 for $1 million ($4 million in 2025 dollars), then a record price for a living artist.
- In 1967, citizens of Basel, Switzerland, raised nearly $2 million to buy two Picasso paintings for their Kunstmuseum Basel.
- In 1890, Alfred Chauchard, owner of the Grands Magasins du Louvre department store, purchased Ernest Meissonier's 1814 The Campaign of France from a banker for 850,000 Fr (US$162,000 in 1890; equivalent to $6 million in 2025), the highest price for a painting by an artist alive or dead.

== See also ==
- List of most expensive paintings
- List of most expensive sculptures
- List of most expensive photographs
- List of most expensive books and manuscripts
- List of most expensive non-fungible tokens
