= Map (painting) =

Painting by Jasper Johns

- Artist: Jasper Johns
- Year: 1961
- Medium: Oil on canvas
- Dimensions: 200 cm × 312.7 cm (78 in × 123 1/8 in)
- Location: Museum of Modern Art, New York

Map is a 1961 oil-on-canvas painting by Jasper Johns. It represents the overall proportions and shapes of the states of the United States and parts of Mexico and Canada, although executed with a more "energetic application of paint" than found in cartography. The names of the states and ocean areas are stencilled.

== Description ==
The painting measures 198.2 centimetres (78.0 in) by 314.7 centimetres (123.9 in). Johns was inspired by a gift from Robert Rauschenberg of some mimeographed outline maps of US states, of the sort that can be colored in by schoolchildren. Johns was attracted to an image that is ubiquitous but "seen and not looked at, not examined", effectively a found object. He copied the outlines to a large canvas, to which he added bright splashes of red, yellow, and blue, sometimes mixed, with accents of black and white. His rough brushwork resembles an Abstract Expressionist style or the late works of Paul Cézanne. Although the outlines of the states are recognizable, the colors do not always respect state borders, perhaps suggesting the blurring of boundaries and homogenization of post-war American society, reinforced by the mass-produced effect of the stencilled names. It has been suggested that the painting may be a visual pun, as Johns "deliberately put American painting on the map" in the 1950s. Johns considered that he was painting a map, not making a painting of a map.

== Provenance ==
The painting was donated by Mr. and Mrs. Robert C. Scull to the Museum of Modern Art in New York City. Johns continued to make map paintings through the 1960s, including gray versions in 1962 and 1963, a white map in 1965, and a mural 33 feet (10 m) wide and 15 feet (4.6 m) high for Expo 67 in Montreal. Other map paintings by Johns employ encaustic in place of oil paint.
