= Balloon Dog =

Series of sculptures by Jeff Koons

- Balloon Dog (Blue) at The Broad in Los Angeles, California, 2022
- Artist: Jeff Koons
- Year: 1994–2000
- Medium: Stainless steel
- Dimensions: 307.3 cm × 363.2 cm × 114.3 cm (121.0 in × 143.0 in × 45.0 in)

Balloon Dog is a series of sculptures by the American artist Jeff Koons. There are different versions of this sculpture, made between 1994 and 2000, with each having a different color: blue, magenta, yellow, orange and red. All versions of the sculpture are made of stainless steel, using different coatings to produce the different colors.

== Background and concept ==
Balloon Dog is part of Koons' Celebration series of artworks and is one of many sculptures inspired by inflatable characters, including Balloon Swan (2004–2011), Balloon Rabbit (2005–2010), and Balloon Monkey (2006-2013). Koons said about the series, "I've always enjoyed balloon animals because they're like us ... We're balloons. You take a breath and you inhale, it's an optimism. You exhale, and it's kind of a symbol of death".

== Variants ==
The Broad contemporary art museum in Los Angeles has a copy of Balloon Dog (Blue).

In 2013, Balloon Dog (Orange) sold at Christie's for $58.4 million. As of January 2025, it is the fifth most expensive work sold by a living artist at auction.

On February 19, 2023, a small 16 in (41 cm) copy worth $42,000, one of a limited edition of 799, was destroyed by a woman visiting the Art Wynwood art fair in Miami, Florida. She was observed tapping the object with her index finger, causing it to topple over and shatter. The limited edition in Limoges porcelain was produced by the French company Bernardaud.

== In popular culture ==
In the video game Grand Theft Auto Online, developers released Yellow Dog with Cone, a derivative piece of virtual art inspired by Balloon Dog. Yellow Dog with Cone is available for purchase by players in-game and quickly rose in popularity among fans.

In the 2023 film Spider-Man: Across the Spider-Verse, a rendering of the Balloon Dog (Blue) is prominently featured in a scene set in the Solomon R. Guggenheim Museum. In response, Koons said he was "thrilled" to be a part of the film.

== See also ==
- Rabbit, 1986, a series of three identical sculptures by Koons; one of which is the most expensive work sold by a living artist at auction
