= Slice (painting) =

Painting by Jasper Johns

Slice is a 2020 oil painting by the American artist Jasper Johns.

The work is a horizontal, mostly black oil painting that contains references to two outside sources: an anatomical diagram of a knee drawn by a Cameroonian émigré student Jéan-Marc Togodgue; and a map of the distribution of galaxies in a slice of the universe by Valérie de Lapparent, Margaret Geller, and John Huchra with graphics by Michael J. Kurtz. The painting was shown publicly for the first time in September 2021 at the Whitney Museum of American Art in Johns's double museum retrospective Mind/Mirror, held simultaneously at the Whitney and the Philadelphia Museum of Art. The painting is currently a promised gift to the Museum of Modern Art in New York.

Much controversy has ensued over the fact that Johns initially used Togodgue's anatomical drawing of a knee without his knowledge. The artist informed the young student, who attended and played basketball at the Salisbury School near Johns's estate in Sharon, Connecticut after Slice was completed. Johns originally saw the drawing in his orthopedist's office; Togodgue had given the drawing to the same doctor as a thank you for his own surgery. In August 2021, Johns and Togodgue reached an undisclosed settlement for a licensing agreement.

Johns received the image of the galaxies from astrophysicist Margaret Geller prior to executing the painting. The title Slice is taken from the concept that the map represents a slice of the universe.
