= White Flag (painting) =

Painting by Jasper Johns

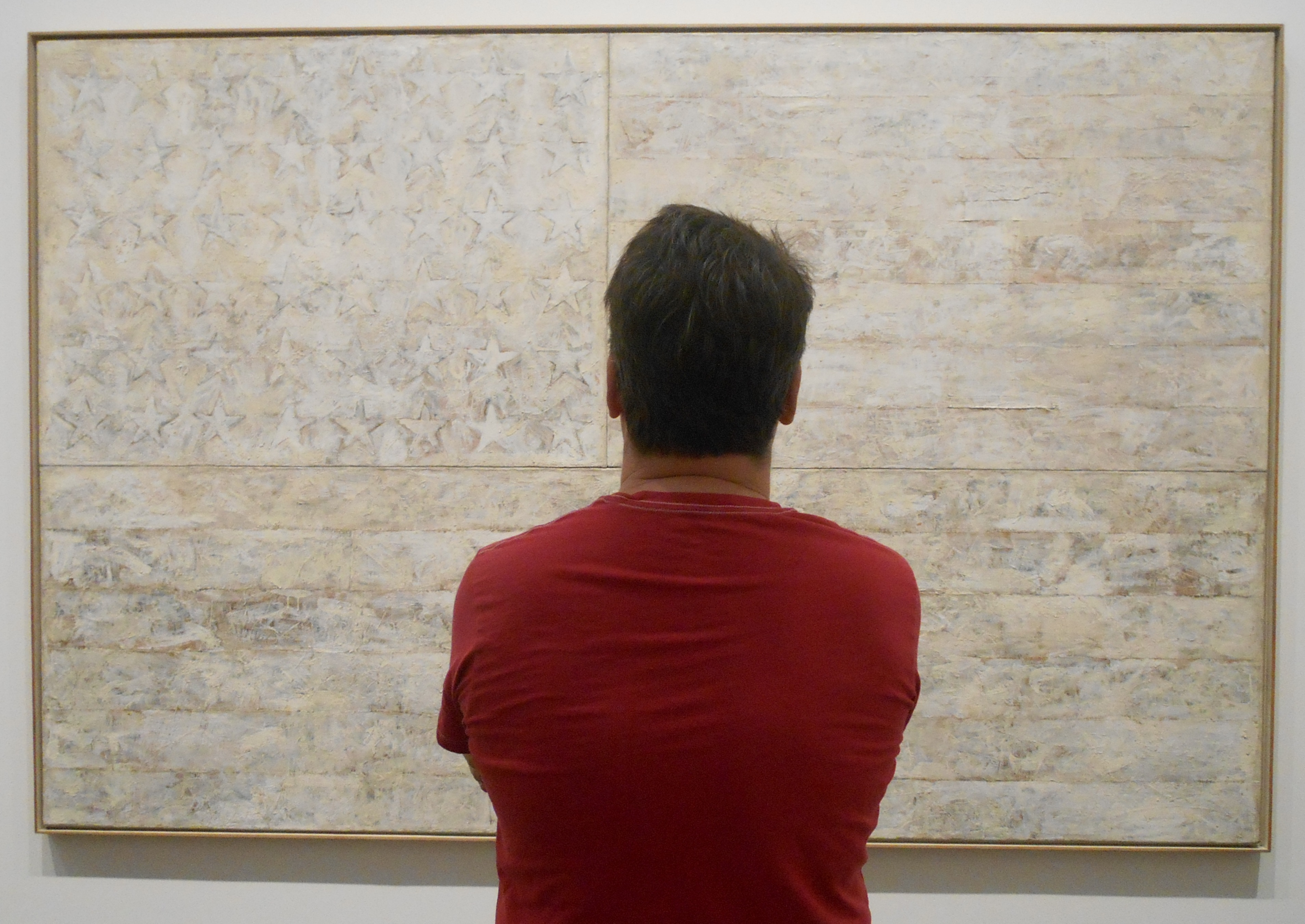
- White Flag at the Metropolitan Museum of Art in 2013 (with observer)
- Artist: Jasper Johns
- Year: 1955
- Medium: Encaustic
- Dimensions: 198.9 cm × 306.7 cm (78.3 in × 120.7 in)
- Location: Metropolitan Museum of Art, New York

White Flag is an encaustic painting by the American artist Jasper Johns. Created in 1955, soon after his first flag painting, entitled simply Flag, it was the first painting by Johns to be acquired by the Metropolitan Museum of Art, in New York, bought from the artist in 1998. The price was undisclosed but experts estimated its value at the time as more than $20 million.

The painting is a relatively early example of the many works created by Johns from 1954, inspired by a dream of the U.S. flag. Painted on canvas using encaustic, oil, newsprint, and charcoal, White Flag is the first monochrome rendering of the US flag by Johns. Measuring 198.9 centimetres (78.3 in) by 306.7 centimetres (120.7 in), it is also the largest of his flag paintings.

Johns worked on three separately stretched areas of canvas—the 48 stars to the upper left, seven of the thirteen stripes to the upper right, and the remaining six longer stripes below—which were then combined to form a whole. The U.S. flag is depicted in the form it took between 1912 and 1959, with 48 white stars on a blue canton representing the then U.S. states (prior to the admission of Alaska and Hawaii) with thirteen red and white stripes. The stars and stripes are built up as a collage of paper and fabric which were dipped in molten beeswax before being applied to a ground of beeswax. The three collages were then joined together and covered with a layer of fast-setting dirty white encaustic (beeswax mixed with white pigment), with highlights added in white oil paint. Johns's rapid brushstrokes are clearly visible in the roughly-finished encaustic medium. The completed work covers the whole of the canvas, with no frame.

Johns' selection of the US flag allows him to explore a familiar two-dimensional object, with its simple internal geometric structure and a complex symbolic meaning. The built-up collage distorts the flag's flatness, while the off-white encaustic obliterates the flag's usual red-white-and-blue coloring, leaving a ghostly embalmed remnant. Johns' Neo-Dada work anticipates aspects of pop art, minimal art, and conceptual art.

At the 1988 Christie's auction, Selections from the Tremaine Collection, a smaller version of White Flag sold for US$7 million, and was briefly the highest auction price for an artwork by a living artist, until it was exceeded the next day by Johns' False Start. (Regarding the smaller version, note the difference in artwork size, exhibition histories, and ownership over the years of the two works, referring to the Met webpage for the larger White Flag.) This smaller version was shown in photographs by Louise Lawler documenting the artwork owners' interiors and its appearance in the 1988 auction.
