= Rabbit (Koons) =

Sculpture by Jeff Koons

- Artist: Jeff Koons
- Year: 1986
- Medium: Stainless steel sculpture
- Subject: Rabbit
- Dimensions: 104.14 x 48.26 x 30.48 cm

Rabbit is a 1986 series of three identical stainless steel sculptures by Jeff Koons. One of the editions of Rabbit is one of the most expensive work sold by a living artist at auction, being sold for $91.1 million in May 2019.

== History ==
In May 2019, the sculpture was auctioned for $91.1 million, breaking the auction record for an artwork by a living artist. The work, which was sold by the estate of the late magazine publisher S. I. Newhouse, was one in an edition of three (plus an artist's proof) and the last still held in private hands. It was later revealed that the art dealer Robert Mnuchin purchased the work for the billionaire hedge fund manager Steven A. Cohen.

In the initial sale of the work, Koons's art dealer Ileana Sonnabend kept one edition and sold the other two for $40,000 each: to the advertising magnate Charles Saatchi, and the painter Terry Winters. In 1991, Saatchi sold the piece to American collector Stefan Edlis for $945,000. Around the same period, Larry Gagosian brokered the deal between Winters and Newhouse, for $1 million. In 2011, at Abu Dhabi Art, Gagosian remembered it as his favorite art deal and "the one transaction that stands out the most." Gagosian regretted not being able buy the piece himself, stating it was "a startling price at the time, a million dollars."

After Sonnabend's death in October 2007, her heirs sold her edition of the piece as part of a package of art works for $400 million to GPS Partners – set up by the art dealers Philippe Ségalot, Lionel Pissarro, and Franck Giraud, on behalf of a consortium of collectors including Carlos Slim, Sammy Ofer, François Pinault, and Qatar's ruling Al Thani family.

In 2000, Edlis's edition of Rabbit was given as a partial donation to the Museum of Contemporary Art in Chicago, where it is still on display.

The other edition of Rabbit is part of the permanent collection of The Broad in Los Angeles, where it is on view to the public as part of the museum's collection of Koons works.

== See also ==
- 1986 in art
- 2019 in art
- List of most expensive sculptures
