= Three Flags =

Painting by Jasper Johns

- Artist: Jasper Johns
- Year: 1958
- Type: Encaustic on canvas
- Dimensions: 77.8 cm × 115.6 cm (30 7/8 in × 45 1/2 in)
- Location: Whitney Museum of American Art; New York

Three Flags is a 1958 painting by American artist Jasper Johns. Held in the permanent collection of the Whitney Museum of American Art in New York since 1980, Three Flags has been described as a "landmark of 20th-century art".

== History and description ==
The work comprises three canvases painted with hot wax. The three canvases form a tiered arrangement, with each canvas approximately 25% smaller than the one below, thereby creating a three-dimensional work. Each canvas is painted to resemble the version of the United States flag that was in use at the time the work was painted, with 48 white stars in a blue canton on a field of thirteen alternating red and white stripes. Each flag is rendered with the approximately correct colors and proportions, as defined by Title 4 of the United States Code.

In a sense, the perspective is reversed, with the smaller paintings projecting out towards the viewer. Only the topmost smallest painting is fully visible; the two behind are only partially visible.

== Provenance ==
The painting was acquired by the Whitney Museum of American Art in New York City for $1 million in 1980 from art collectors Burton and Emily Hall Tremaine, to celebrate its 50th anniversary. At the time, The New York Times reported that it was believed to be the highest price paid for a work by a living artist. Since the early 1960s, Three Flags has been included in numerous exhibitions, and different kinds of books and magazine articles focused on art and American history.
