= Samuel Jackson (Royal Navy officer) =

Royal Navy officer (1775–1845)

Rear-Admiral Samuel Jackson CB
- Born: 1775; Bognor, Sussex
- Died: 16 January 1845 (aged 69–70); Bognor, Sussex
- Military career
- Allegiance: United Kingdom
- Branch: Royal Navy
- Service years: 1790–1845
- Rank: Rear-Admiral of the Blue
- Commands: HMS Autumn; HMS Musquito; HMS Surveillante; HMS Superb; HMS Poictiers; HMS Lacedaemonian; HMS Niger; HMS Madagascar; Sheerness Ordinary; HMS Bellerophon; HMS Royal Sovereign; Pembroke Dockyard
- Conflicts: French Revolutionary Wars; Siege of Toulon; Battle of Genoa; Battle of the Hyères Islands; Battle of Cape St. Vincent; Assault on Cádiz (1797); Second Battle of Algeciras; Napoleonic Wars; Raid on Boulogne; Battle of Copenhagen; Walcheren Campaign; War of 1812
- Awards: Companion of the Order of the Bath

Rear-Admiral Samuel Jackson CB (1775–16 January 1845) was a Royal Navy officer of the eighteenth and nineteenth centuries. Jackson joined the Royal Navy in 1790 and served before the French Revolutionary War in the cutter HMS Kite. He transferred in 1793 to the frigate HMS Romulus, in which he participated in the Siege of Toulon. After having served for a while in the Mediterranean Jackson transferred with the captain of Romulus, John Sutton, to the ship of the line HMS Egmont. In her Jackson fought in 1795 at the battles of Genoa and the Hyères Islands. In 1796, having been promoted to lieutenant and still in Egmont, Jackson was integral in the saving of the entire crew of the ship of the line HMS Bombay Castle off the Tagus during a large storm. In the following year he fought at the Battle of Cape St. Vincent and with Horatio Nelson at the assault on Cádiz.

In 1798 Jackson moved with Sutton to the ship of the line HMS Superb, where he became her first lieutenant. He remained in this position when Richard Goodwin Keats took command and they were deployed on the Cádiz blockade. Superb distinguished herself at the Second Battle of Algeciras in 1801. Jackson was given command of one of the prizes from the battle, the ship of the line San Antoine. Despite being vastly outnumbered by the captives on board, Jackson distinguished himself by successfully subduing an attempted take over and bringing the ship safely to Gibraltar. For his services in San Antoine and the battle he was promoted to commander. In 1803 he was given command of the sloop HMS Autumn in which he spent the majority of his time fighting the forces of the Boulogne Flotilla. He fought a number of engagements against the ships and fortifications of Calais and Boulogne in this period, and also in 1805 saved a large troop convoy under his control from destruction off the Texel. In 1807 Jackson, now commanding the brig HMS Musquito, was part of a squadron blockading Zealand in the Copenhagen Expedition.

Jackson was promoted to post captain after this and given command of his old ship Superb at the end of the year. He served for a while in the English Channel and Mediterranean before going to the Baltic Sea where, again under the command of Richard Goodwin Keats, he participated in the evacuation of La Romana's division in 1808. After being frozen in at Gothenburg through the winter, Jackson then joined the Walcheren Expedition in 1809. Superb was decommissioned after this and Jackson stayed unemployed until 1812 when he was made temporary captain of the ship of the line HMS Poictiers, in which he served in the English Channel and North Sea Fleet. After this he was given command of the frigate HMS Lacedaemonian, sailing to the North America Station to fight in the War of 1812 in 1813. Here he commanded a blockading squadron, taking and destroying £500,000 worth of goods in the last year of the war. After returning home in 1815 Jackson was given command of another frigate, HMS Niger, and sent back to North America where he became senior naval officer on the coast of Nova Scotia. In 1817 Niger was in such a poor state that Jackson was forced to leave her and return home in a transport ship.

Jackson was not given another command until 1822 when he was appointed to the Ordinary at Sheerness Dockyard, where he stayed for three years. He then commanded the ship of the line HMS Bellerophon in the Mediterranean between 1836 and 1838, and upon returning home became captain of the royal yacht HMS Royal Sovereign and captain-superintendent of Pembroke Dockyard. He held both these commands until he was promoted to rear-admiral in 1841. He did not serve again after achieving flag rank, and died in 1845.

== Naval career ==
=== Junior officer ===
==== Initial service ====
Samuel Jackson was born at Bognor in Sussex, in 1775. He joined the Royal Navy as a midshipman on board the cutter HMS Kite on 4 July 1790. In Kite he served primarily on the Irish Station through the years of peace preceding the beginning of the French Revolutionary Wars in 1793, fighting smugglers. Kite was broken up in December 1793, but before this Jackson had transferred to the frigate HMS Romulus, commanded by Captain John Sutton. In Romulus Jackson was promoted to master's mate, and he was already serving in her when she sailed to Gibraltar on 22 April. The journey was fraught with illness and over 100 members of the crew had to be sent to Gibraltar's hospital upon their reaching that port. Despite this Romulus was immediately sent to join the initial naval force capturing the city of Toulon. Jackson stayed in Romulus throughout this period, and was still with her when she was sent to Leghorn afterwards.

==== Mediterranean Fleet ====
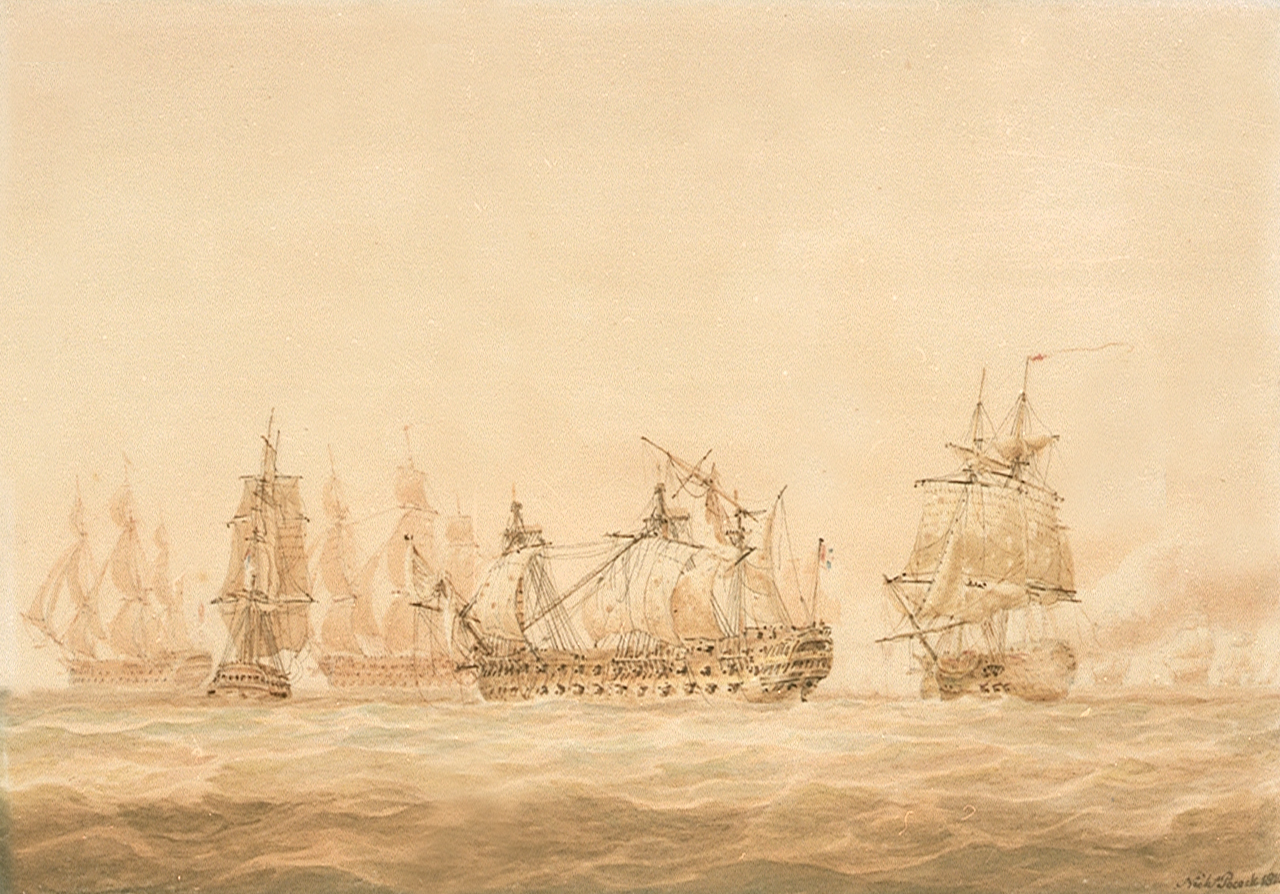
A scene from the Battle of Genoa, in which Jackson was slightly injured

From here Romulus joined with the frigate HMS Meleager to hunt down a group of privateers loyal to the French cause and known to operate off Capraja. The two frigates discovered the enemy force holed up in a location inaccessible to the two large vessels, and so the small boats of the ships were launched to attack them. The command of one of the boats involved in the attack was given to Jackson. The French had left their ships to hide behind rocky outcrops on the coast, and the British boats sailed in under heavy musket fire before successfully attacking and capturing the force and their ships. Four ships were captured in this attack, and in a similarly successful attack soon after Jackson was again the commander of one of the boats involved.

Romulus and Jackson stayed in the Mediterranean Sea after these actions, participating in a prolonged attack on the forts of Bastia with the ship of the line HMS Agamemnon. Sutton was then transferred to the command of the ship of the line HMS Egmont in May 1794, and he brought Jackson with him. Egmont was part of the main force of Vice-Admiral William Hotham's Mediterranean Fleet; as such she fought in the Battle of Genoa on 14 March 1795, against the French fleet from Toulon, in which battle he was slightly wounded. The day after this Egmont was preparing to move on and Jackson was tasked with gathering in some of the ship's cables in a small boat trailing behind the ship. While he was doing this Egmont suddenly backed her sails, slowing considerably, to get nearer to a prize. In doing so the large ship completely destroyed Jackson's boat, sinking it instantly, but Jackson and his crew were "providentially" saved from death by Egmont.

Egmont stayed with the fleet after this, fighting in the Battle of the Hyères Islands on 13 July where the French ship of the line Alcide was destroyed. Jackson continued in Egmont after this when she joined the force of Vice-Admiral William Waldegrave to participate in negotiations in Tunisia in spring 1796. On 9 March, Jackson participated in a boat action wherein the force captured the French warships Nemesis and Sardine, as well as a polacre, and destroyed a cutter.

==== Bombay Castle rescue ====
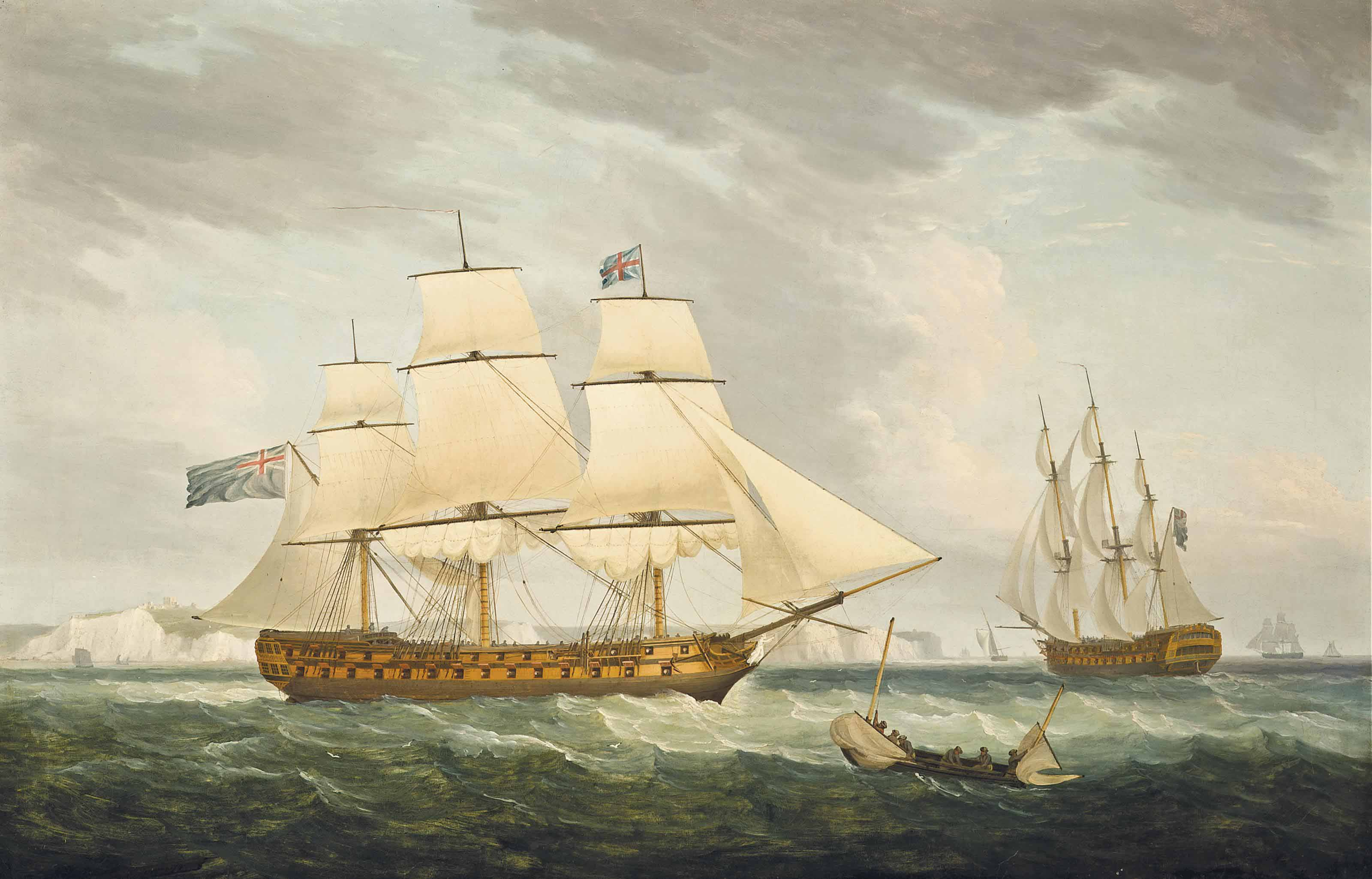
Bombay Castle, whose crew were saved by Jackson's endeavours upon her grounding

Soon after this Jackson left the service of Sutton and joined the ship of the line HMS Victory, the flagship of the new commander of the Mediterranean Fleet, Admiral Sir John Jervis. Jervis promoted Jackson to lieutenant on 3 November, and he was transferred in that rank to serve in the store ship HMS Alliance. He served only briefly in this vessel, re-joining Sutton in Egmont as her most junior lieutenant at the end of the year. The fleet then sailed to Lisbon. On 23 December the fleet was entering the Tagus when one of the ships, the ship of the line HMS Bombay Castle, was grounded on a sandbank after being swept away by a current while avoiding a collision with the store ship HMS Camel. An effort to free Bombay Castle was immediately launched and Jackson was given command of Egmont's boats for the operation.

After two days of attempting to free the ship a strong gale began which convinced the crews that it was now impossible to save the ship. Jackson then volunteered to and successfully traversed the increasingly bad sea conditions to bring a letter to Jervis explaining the perilous position of Bombay Castle's crew. Jervis gave Jackson the responsibility of navigating all the remaining boats of the fleet back to the stranded ship to remove her crew to safety. This being done, all of the crew bar her officers were transported to the ship of the line HMS Zealous. The ship's officers had refused to leave until the rest of the crew did, but while this operation was taking place the sands around Bombay Castle moved and made it impossible for Jackson's boats to go alongside to take them off. Despite the increasingly stormy condition of the seas Jackson took the boat he was in, Egmont's launch, through the waves to the jibboom of the ship, from where the officers were able to lower themselves into his boat and were saved. In the subsequent court martial held for the loss of Bombay Castle Jackson was praised by the president of the court, Captain Thomas Foley, for his "intrepidity and humanity" in saving the entire crew.

==== Cádiz blockade ====
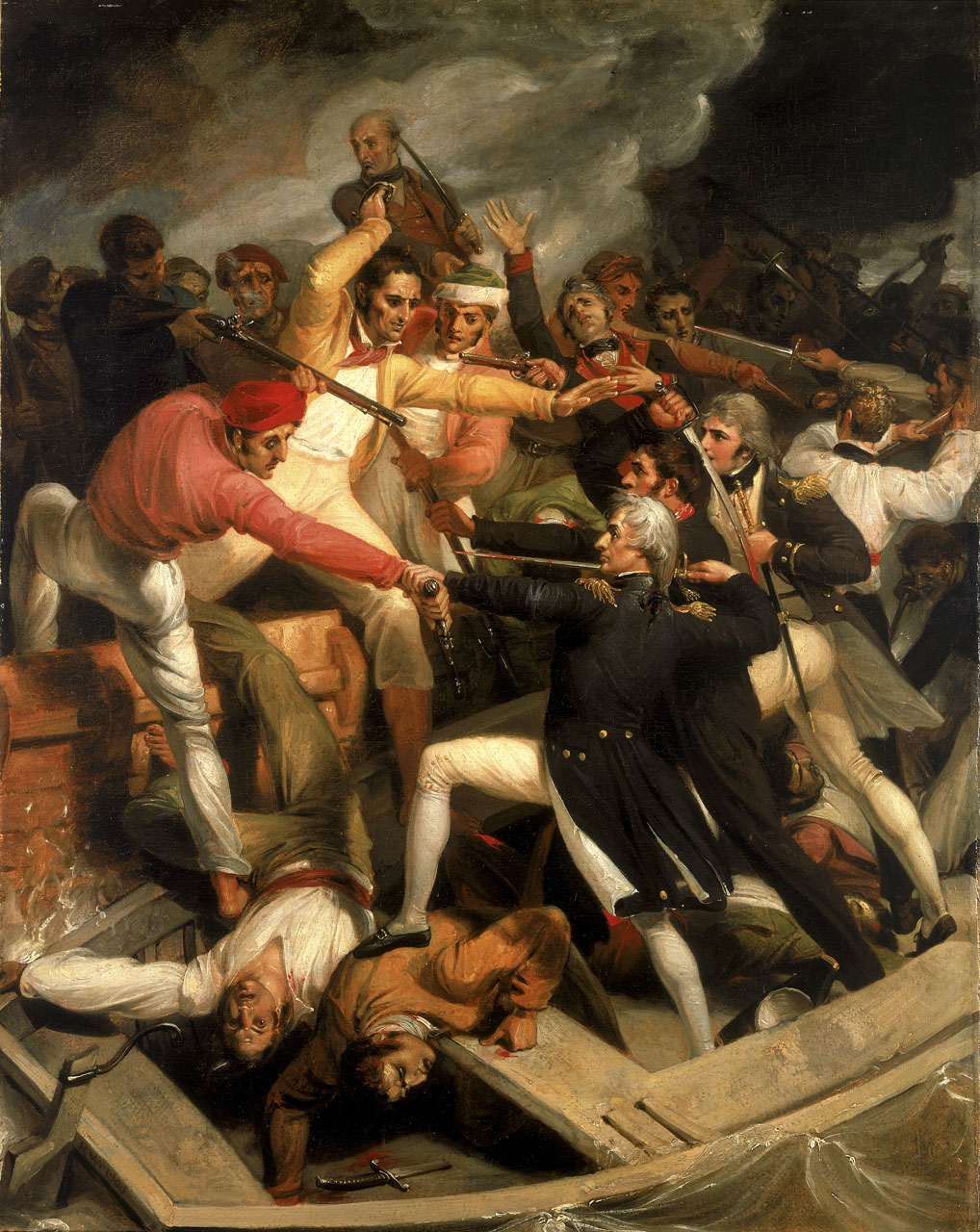
Nelson boarding the lead Spanish ship at the assault on Cádiz; Jackson would be on the opposite side of this painting

Despite this Jackson was not further rewarded for his actions and stayed in Egmont with the Mediterranean Fleet. As such on 13 February 1797 he fought in the Battle of Cape St. Vincent and was slightly wounded during the fighting, although Egmont had no outright casualties recorded in the engagement. By 3 July Egmont was part of a force bombarding Cádiz with the bomb vessel HMS Thunder. In firing so much Thunder damaged the barrel of her mortar and began to retire towards the main fleet of Rear-Admiral Sir Horatio Nelson. The Spanish inside Cádiz sent out a large force of small ships to cut off Thunder in an attempt to capture her. Again Jackson took charge of one of Egmont's boats, this time as part of the rescue effort led by Nelson himself. As Nelson attacked the Spanish commander's vessel from one side, Jackson boarded it from the other, and the action was successful in saving Thunder and also capturing three of the Spanish vessels.

Jackson continued in his role as a lieutenant in Egmont until that ship was paid off in early 1798. He was then appointed to the brand new ship of the line HMS Superb with Sutton as her captain and Jackson as the first lieutenant, serving in the Channel Fleet, in May. In June 1799 Superb was sent as part of a detached squadron to join the force of Rear-Admiral Sir Charles Cotton in chasing the escaped fleet of Étienne Eustache Bruix from Brest to the Mediterranean. This chase having concluded when Bruix reached Cádiz, Egmont returned to the Channel. In 1801 Sutton was replaced in command of Superb with Captain Richard Goodwin Keats, but for a period after this he was absent and Jackson was given temporary command of the ship. Superb then served as a convoy escort before joining the Cádiz blockade in around June 1801.

=== Second Battle of Algeciras ===
Keats having returned to command Superb, they were watching the entrance to the River Guadilquivir, somewhat detached from the main British force, under Rear-Admiral Sir James Saumarez which went in search of a French squadron thought to be exiting the Mediterranean. The Superb remained off Cádiz. Saumarez found the French anchored in the bay of Algeciras and launched an attack as soon as he arrived in the bay. A failing breeze and extensive shoals cruelled his chances of success and the severely battered fleet retreated to Gibraltar to repair.

A few days later Spanish reinforcements were seen preparing to leave Cádiz and Keats's squadron preceded them under a press of sail to Gibraltar. When on 12 July the combined French and Spanish squadron made to leave the bay to escape to Cádiz, Saumarez, although outnumbered two to one went in chase, which led to the Second Battle of Algeciras. The Superb was the fastest ship in the squadron and was ordered to sail ahead to attack the rear of the enemy. As the wind increased to a fresh gale in the straits the Superb soon went at 11.5 knots, leaving her compatriots miles behind and closing on the enemy. With lights concealed and making no signals she ranged alongside a Spanish three decker (the Real Carlos) and discharged three broadsides before being met by return of fire. Some of her shot was high and passed through the rigging to hit the ship further to leeward, (the San Hermengildo). This second Spanish ship was not aware of Superb and assumed Real Carlos to be the enemy ship attacking her; she began to fire into her compatriot and was in turn fired at by the Real Carlos. The San Hermenegildo still believing the Real Carlos to be British came under her stern to discharge raking fire through her length, but was caught in a violent gust that brought the two great ships together and transmitted the fire to the second ship. Both Spanish ships blew up, the concussion heard or felt from Gibraltar to Cádiz, with a terrible loss of life. The Superb passed on in the night to attack an opponent better able to contend with her.

==== Capture of San Antoine ====
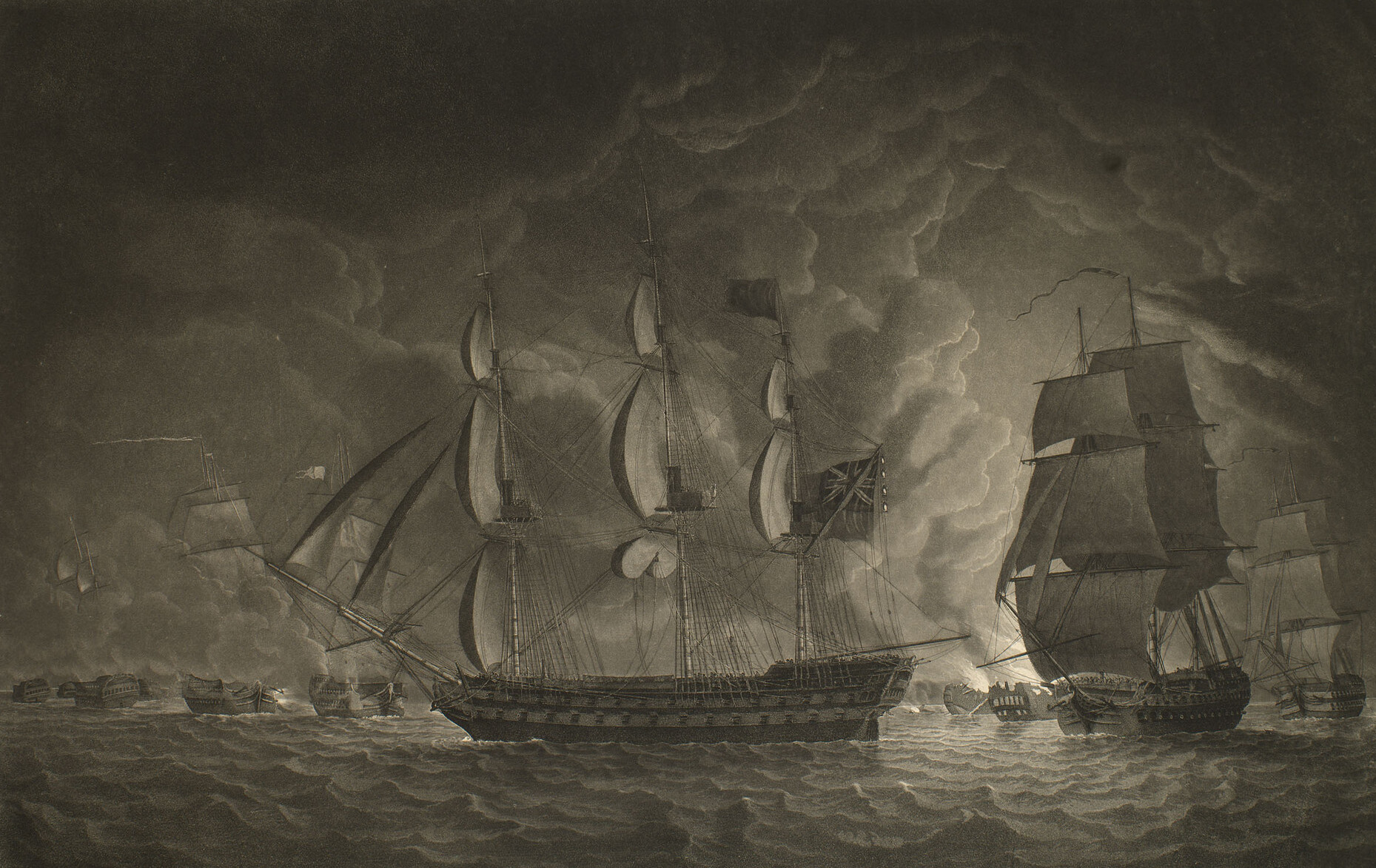
The recently captured San Antoine (forefront, right) sits at anchor in front of the burning Real Carlos and San Hermengildo

In the subsequent fleet action Superb continued fighting and engaged the French ship of the line San Antoine for half an hour before accepting her surrender. Jackson was given command of San Antoine as a prize ship. In taking control of the recently captured ship, Jackson had under his command only his boat's crew and five marines. San Antoine on the other hand still had on board 200 of her French crew, 100 French soldiers and 500 Spanish seamen. Jackson's command of the ship started ignominiously when his boat sank just as he was going on board San Antoine, for a second time in his career narrowly avoiding disaster in a small boat. By the beginning of 13 July the British fleet had moved on and left Jackson alone with San Antoine. The ship was heavily damaged from the battle and in order to safely navigate the ship Jackson took her close to the coast of Cape Trafalgar, and being so close to home this gave hope of escape to the multitude of enemy prisoners on board.

A plan was begun to retake the ship and to run her in to Cádiz. The French officers on board learned of the plan and in respect for their status as honourable captives they chose to tell Jackson of the plan. Jackson and his men quickly disarmed the prisoners before they could put their plan into action. This action caused the two factions, French and Spanish, to accuse each other of giving up the secret and violent attacks to break out between the prisoners. Jackson drew on his relationship with the French officers and their men and temporarily conscripted them as guards over the Spanish, who were locked below in the ship. This finalised Jackson's control of San Antoine and the French extended their assistance to him by helping to repair the ship as well. Being now completely safe, Jackson survived unharmed until the next day when Keats and Superb returned to tow him into Gibraltar. For his success in this endeavour, and for being first lieutenant of one of the most heavily engaged ships in the prior battle, Jackson was promoted to commander on 18 August.

Captain Keats's detailed account of the battle was published some years later; ‘Narrative of the services of His Majesty's Ship Superb, 74 on the night of the 12 July 1801 and two following days, by her then captain, Sir Richard Goodwin Keats'.(Longman, London 1838, Somerset Records Office, DD/CPL/30)

=== Commander ===
==== Calais and the Boulogne Flotilla ====
Jackson was not given a command through the rest of the French Revolutionary War and the Peace of Amiens, but upon the start of the Napoleonic Wars in 1803 he was given command of the sloop HMS Autumn to serve in the English Channel, on 10 May. Soon after, Rear-Admiral Robert Montagu assigned Jackson in Autumn to the command of a squadron of small ships stationed offshore of Calais. The squadron was given the task of preventing the gun boats inside the port from sallying to join with and strengthen the Boulogne Flotilla nearby. Jackson took his small fleet close to the north east shore of the town on 27 September to bombard the ships anchored inside. The French returned a heavy fire but failed to hit any of the ships for the several hours they attacked the port. Jackson's bombardment set the east end of Calais on fire with the shots that had overflown the anchored ships, also destroying many of the gun boats, and only stopped when a change in the wind moved the ships out of position and altered their firing pattern. The attack was lauded by Admiral Lord Keith in a letter to Jackson. While it was surmised that much damage was done in the operation, Jackson felt that more could be done with better preparation and his comments resulted in bombardments of the coastal towns being suspended until a larger force could be provided for the task.

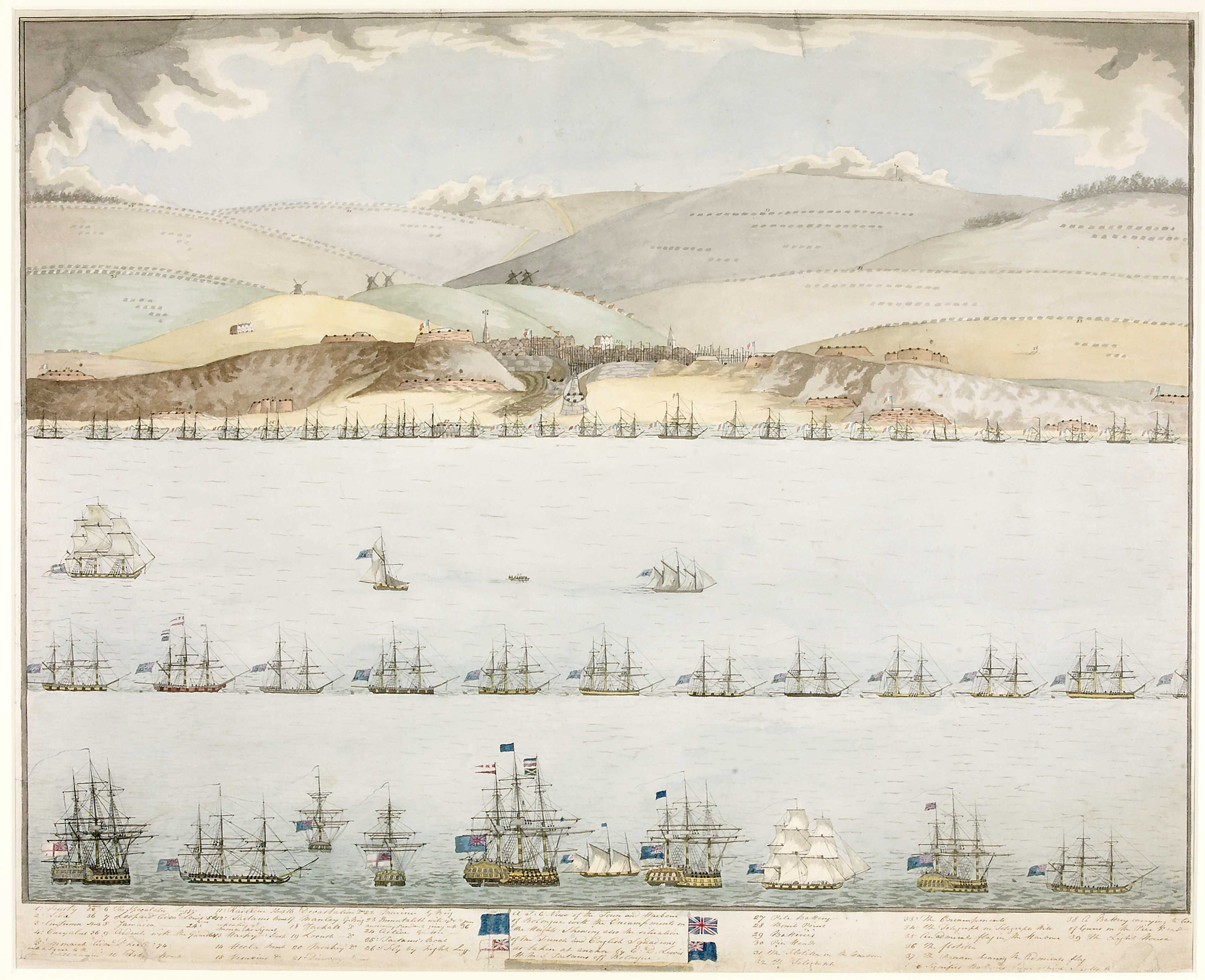
Disposition of ships at the Catamaran Expedition

Towards the beginning of 1804 some of the ships left in Calais sailed for Boulogne, staying close to the French coast so as to gain the added protection of the shore batteries there. Jackson and his squadron quickly attacked them as their made their move, driving a number of them ashore before they could reach their goal, however some of the ships succeeded in escaping his attack, in which he lost one man killed and six wounded. By July he was serving in the squadron of Captain Edward Owen, tasked with obstructing the traffic of warships along the coast. On the night of 19 July there was a large storm off Boulogne which imperilled many of the French ships, forcing them to leave their anchors and run for safety. Owen's squadron was situated twenty-four miles off Boulogne at the time and managed to intercept a number of the ships as they moved away from the cover of the French coast. When the force attacked there were forty-five brigs and forty-three luggers left off Boulogne, and after a night of attacking and chasing what vessels they could find, there were only nineteen brigs and eight luggers remaining in the morning. While the darkness and sea conditions made it impossible to gauge how many French ships had escaped, been destroyed by the British or been blown ashore independently by the storm, it was seen as a great success and Jackson was praised for his part in the attack.

In the autumn of the same year, another attack was planned against the Boulogne Flotilla, this time with a mass of explosive ships, called the Catamaran Expedition. Jackson was ordered to attack one of the French ships, Admiral Bruix, and sailed his explosive ship alongside in the middle of the night. While preparing to light the string that would set off the explosives, it was lost in the dark and as the ship sailed past Admiral Bruix the moment to attack was almost lost, but Jackson personally broke open the ship's hatches and set alight the explosives before escaping in his boat twenty-five seconds before the explosion occurred. He was congratulated for this feat despite the ensuing explosion doing nothing but destroying the French ship's bowsprit.

The force were at this time assigned as part of the Downs Station, and upon returning there after this failed attack Jackson was invited to dine with the Prime Minister, William Pitt, Foreign Secretary, Lord Harrowby, and the First Lord of the Admiralty, Lord Melville, at Walmer Castle. During this meeting Melville promised that he would promote Jackson to post-captain for his deeds. Despite Melville considering Jackson's and a number of officers on the Down Station's promotions as "a duty I owe them", he retired from office in the following year and did not follow through on his promise. Jackson left Autumn in October, and was immediately appointed to a new command, that of the brig HMS Musquito, to serve on the North Sea Station.

==== North Sea and Hanover Expedition ====
On 12 April 1805 he was patrolling in Musquito off Scarborough when three ships were spotted; two of these were firing at and chasing the third. Jackson caught the ship being chased first, which was a smuggler based out of Guernsey. Musquito chased the other two ships through the night and finally captured them in the following morning. They were the French privateer koffs Orestes and Pylades. As 1805 came to an end Jackson still commanded Musquito, and was given control of a convoy of troopships containing 5,000 soldiers and a large amount of ammunition and provisions, intended for the Hanover Expedition. Jackson was given a group of special government-appointed pilots to assist him in conveying the convoy across the Channel. The fleet left the Nore and a day later Jackson estimated that they had reached the mouth of the Texel and were in danger of the wind blowing them ashore. The pilots argued that Jackson was incorrect in his calculations and that the convoy was safely at sea. In reply to this, Jackson suspended the pilots from their duties just as Musquito approached a series of sand banks.

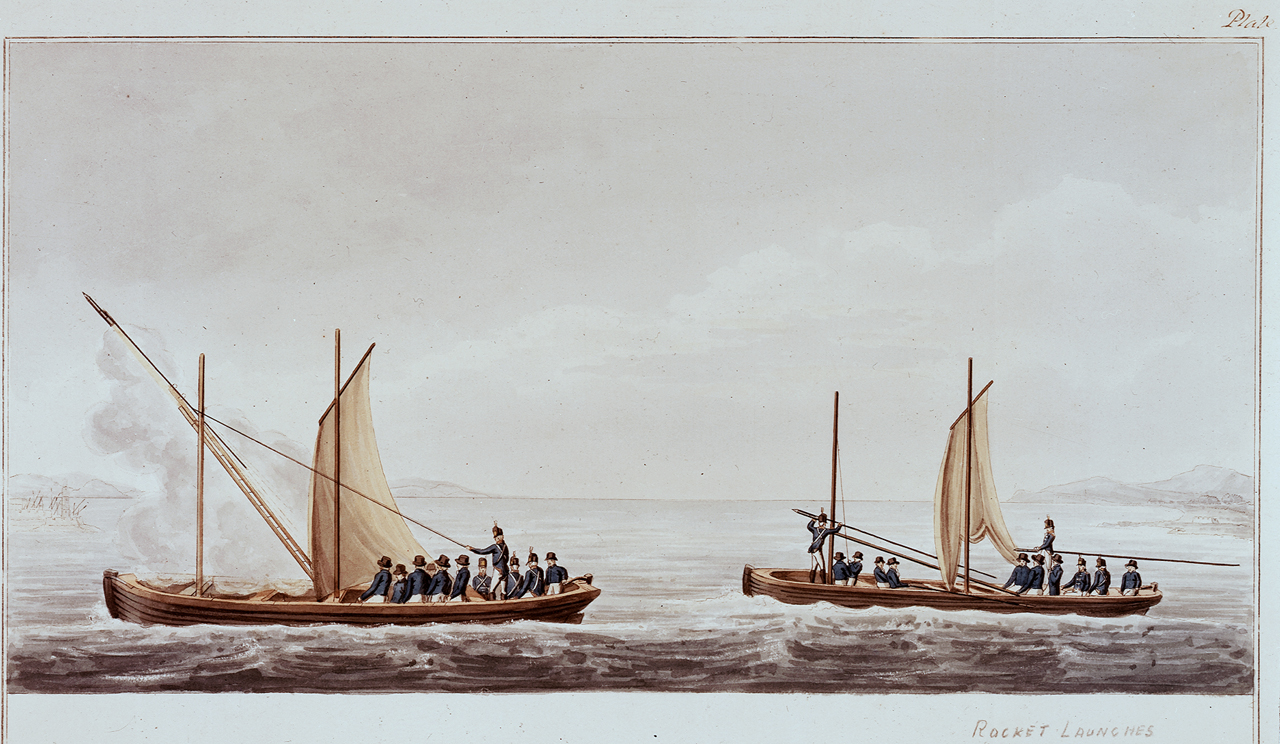
A rocket attack, an illustration by William Congreve from his treatise

As this occurred, a transport closer in to shore than Jackson's vessel, the converted frigate HMS Helder, grounded on the Dutch shore. The convoy was unable to save the ship and her crew and the 500 soldiers on board were captured the next day. It was noted that without the intervention of Jackson as to the course of the convoy, it was very possible that the entirety of it would have suffered the fate of Helder. The senior army officer in the convoy, Colonel Cookson of the Royal Artillery, wrote a letter to the commander of the Hanover Expedition, Lieutenant-General Lord Cathcart, complimenting Jackson on his actions after the remainder of the convoy had safely arrived in the Weser.

After this, and into 1806, Jackson was given command of a group of ships stationed off Boulogne and Calais, again tasked with stopping the transit of small and lightly armed warships along the coast. He again found success in this duty, on one occasion attacking five French schooners and destroying two of them. In October 1806 he again attempted to attack Boulogne, this time with ships armed with Congreve rockets. After thirty minutes of firing, the town was set on fire and much damaged, but the rockets failed to do any considerable damage to the Flotilla itself. Despite this the rockets were deemed a success and would go on to be used more frequently in operations by the military.

=== Post-captain ===
==== Baltic service ====
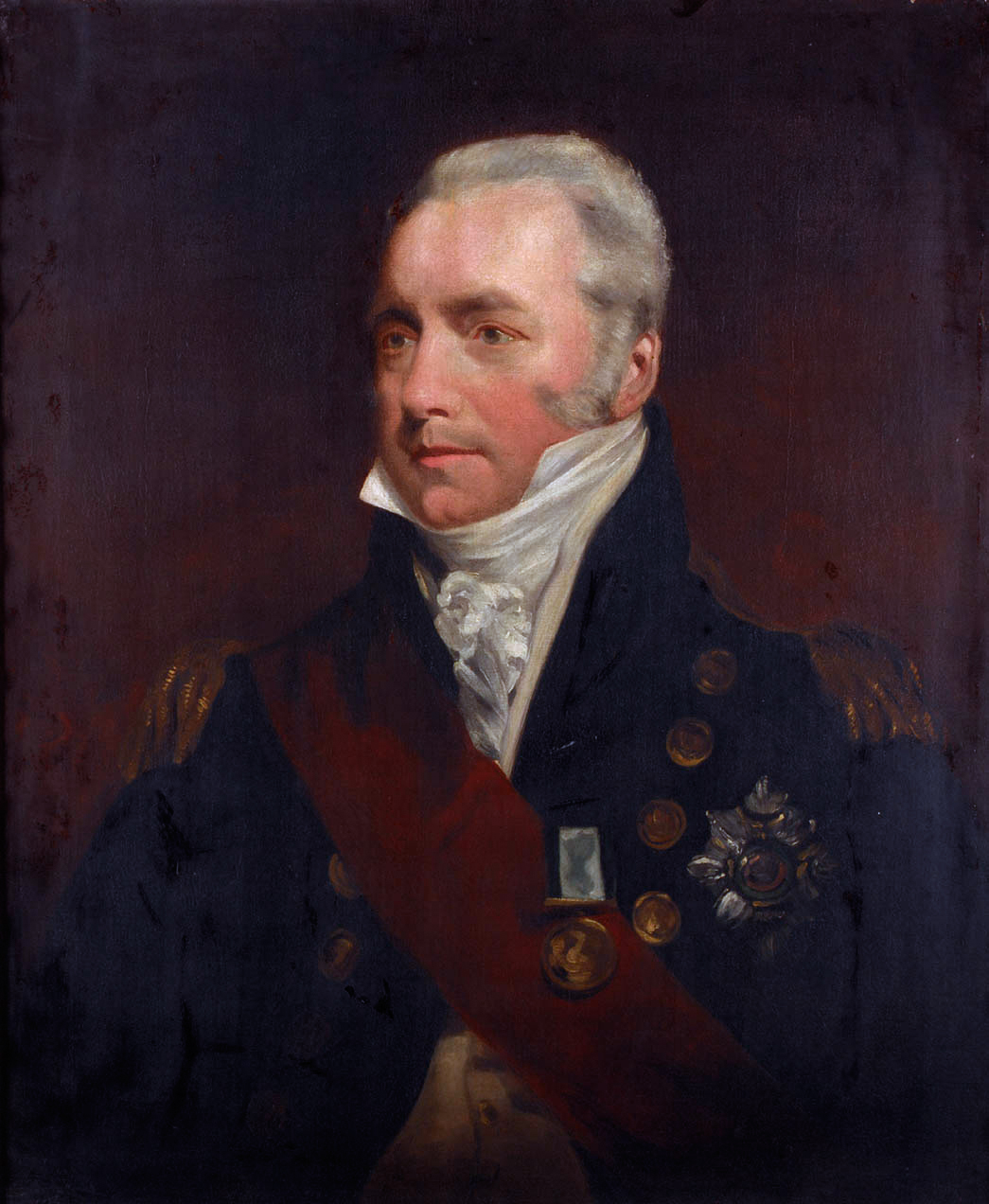
Sir Richard Goodwin Keats, who Jackson frequently served under

Jackson continued serving in the Channel in Musquito, and was next attached to a squadron commanded by his old captain Keats, now a commodore for the purposes of his command. The squadron took part in the Copenhagen Expedition in 1807, patrolling the Great Belt to stop supplies being transported to the beleaguered garrisons of Zealand. When Copenhagen surrendered and gave up the navy to the British, Jackson was given temporary command of the frigate HMS Surveillante when in turn her captain was sent home with the Expedition's celebratory dispatches. Jackson in turn sailed the frigate to England as well, and was subsequently confirmed in that position as a post-captain on 5 November. His position in Surveillante being only temporary, Jackson was given a different command on 8 December, which was of his old ship Superb.

In Superb Jackson joined the squadron of Rear-Admiral Sir Richard Strachan and chased a French squadron that had escaped from Rochefort to the Mediterranean. Having been unable to catch that force, Superb and Jackson returned to England from where he was assigned to the Baltic Sea squadron of the now Rear-Admiral Keats as his flag captain. In August 1808 the squadron participated in the evacuation of La Romana's division, wherein a Spanish division that had been serving with the French army in Germany was repatriated to Spain after France began the Peninsular War. Having completed this operation, Jackson was unable to do anything else over the winter because Superb was frozen in ice while anchored at Gothenburg. He was able to return to duty in January 1809 after a canal was cut through four miles of ice for his ship to travel through, but by this point the heavy service of Superb had left her in a poor condition to continue serving.

Expecting that he would soon be removed from his command due to her defectiveness, Jackson offered his services to Keith in the hope that that admiral would soon receive a new command. While Keith responded positively to Jackson's request, he did not receive a new command nor did he expect one. Instead, Jackson was sent under Strachan again to participate in the Walcheren Campaign from July 1809. The operation ended in December and Superb sailed back to England having deteriorated even more, to such an extent that she was put in for a major repair and decommissioned. Jackson stayed ashore, unemployed by the navy, until 14 January 1812 when he was appointed to temporarily command the ship of the line HMS Poictiers in the English Channel. He transferred with Poictiers soon after to join the North Sea Fleet of Admiral William Young off the Texel. Jackson commanded the ship until July, and received a new command on 21 December of the same year; the brand new frigate HMS Lacedaemonian to command on the North American Station, the War of 1812 being underway. He arrived on station in Lacedaemonian on 2 June 1813.

==== War of 1812 ====
Jackson was given command of a squadron to blockade the American ports and rivers between Cape Fear and Amelia Island. On 23 September, with the brig HMS Mohawk under his command, he used his ship's boats to attack and capture an American gunboat and four merchant ships in a stream that were being protected from land by a force of American militia, while he patrolled between the islands of Cumberland and Jekyll. He continued on station, and shortly after 15 January 1815 Jackson sailed up the Chesapeake River and successfully recaptured an East India Company ship, that had recently been taken, finding no resistance from American forces as he did so. The war ended a month later and Jackson sailed for home in Lacedaemonian, arriving at Portsmouth on 4 June. It was calculated that his work in blockade during the war had captured or destroyed £500,000 worth of American goods.

Jackson left Lacedaemonian soon afterwards and was given command of another frigate, HMS Niger, on 29 August. He sailed back to North America in Niger, transporting the new Ambassador to the United States, Charles Bagot. Having left Bagot at Annapolis, Jackson then took the new Governor of Canada, Lieutenant-General Sir John Sherbrooke, from Halifax to Quebec. Jackson was then assigned as senior naval officer on the coast of Nova Scotia towards the end of 1816. He continued serving in this position until September 1817 when Niger was found to be unserviceable and he was forced to return with his crew to England in a transport ship, arriving there in September. For his services in North America he had been made a Companion of the Order of the Bath on 8 December 1815.

==== Later service and flag rank ====
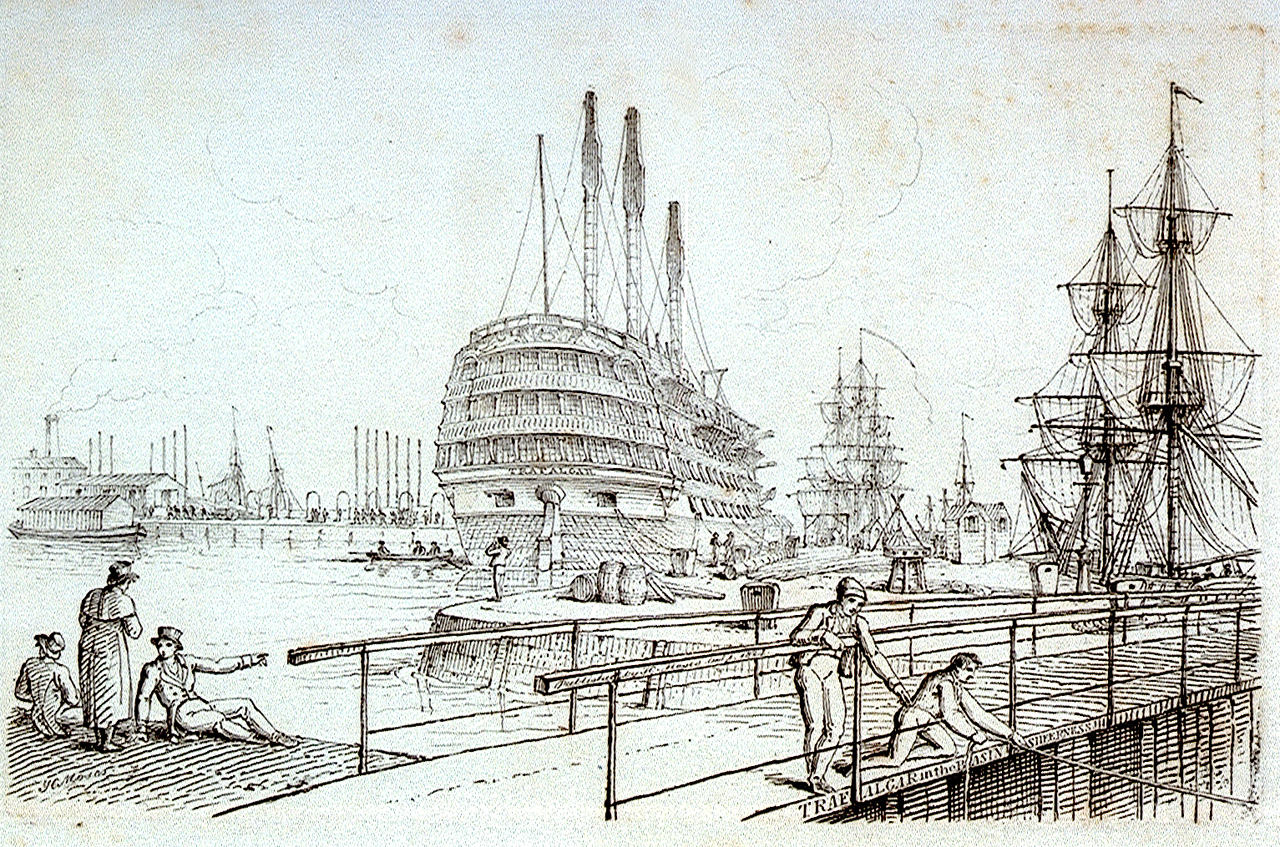
Sheerness Dockyard during Jackson's tenure commanding the Ordinary

Niger being unrepairable, Jackson stayed ashore for the next five years. For part of this he commanded the laid up frigate HMS Madagascar until she was broken up in May 1819. He was then given command of the Ordinary at Sheerness Dockyard on 29 October 1822, which position he held for the proscribed period of three years. In September 1827 a friend of Jackson's, the naval officer and explorer Frederick William Beechey, named one of the points at the entrance to Port Clarence, Alaska after him in compliment to some assistance Jackson had given him in starting the voyage of exploration.

Jackson did not receive his next command until 5 April 1836 when he was given the ship of the line HMS Bellerophon, which he sailed out to the Mediterranean in. Here he served as flag captain to Rear-Admiral Sir Charles Paget for twenty months before relinquishing his command. Jackson did not stay on half pay for long as he was appointed to command the royal yacht HMS Royal Sovereign, the largest yacht built during the reign of King George III, on 19 February 1838. At the same time he was appointed captain-superintendent of Pembroke Dockyard, where the yacht was based. He was described in his service as captain-superintendent as a "Nelson man". He relinquished these appointments upon his promotion to rear-admiral, which occurred on 23 November 1841. He was not employed again by the Royal Navy after this. Jackson died on 16 January 1845 at Bognor, Sussex.

== Ancient coins ==
While serving in command of Bellerophon in the Mediterranean, Jackson met soldier, antiquarian and scholar Thomas Reade who was at the time the British consul general in Tunis. Together they obtained a large collection of ancient Roman, Greek, and Cufic coins, probably from a merchant, at Carthage. Jackson had previously met and made a friend of the doctor Benjamin Fonseca Outram, while serving on Superb as a lieutenant. In 1843 Outram exhibited Jackson and Reade's coin collection to a meeting of the Royal Numismatic Society. Some time after this the collection was lost and not rediscovered until 1986 in Scotland. Upon its rediscovery the collection was examined again, and has been described as singularly important. Among the 483 coins is the largest single collection of Umayyad and Abbasid copper coins, and the oldest known hoard of Roman Republic coinage found in North Africa.

== Family ==
Jackson married Clarissa Harriet Madden, the daughter of Captain Charles Madden, Royal Marines, and niece of Major-General Sir George Madden, on 6 December 1817. They had three sons:

- Captain Charles Keats Jackson, Royal Navy officer, died 25 December 1897.
- Lieutenant-Colonel George Edward Owen Jackson, Royal Marines officer, died 2 May 1903.
- Ensign Outram Montagu Jackson, East India Company officer of the 26th Native Infantry Regiment, died 17 March 1844 while serving in the East Indies.
