= Benjamin Fonseca Outram =

English naval surgeon and physician

Sir Benjamin Fonseca Outram KCB (1774 – 16 February 1856) was an English naval surgeon and physician.

== Life ==
The son of Captain William Outram, he was born in Kilham, in the East Riding of Yorkshire, and educated as a surgeon at the United Borough hospitals in London. He was first employed in the naval medical service in 1794, and was promoted to the rank of surgeon in 1796. He served in HMS Harpy, HMS La Nymphe, and HMS Boadicea. He was surgeon in HMS Superb in the second battle of Algeciras, where Sir James Saumarez obtained a victory over the French and Spanish fleets on 12 July 1801. He received war medals and clasps for his services under Sir Richard Goodwin Keats. Then for a period he was surgeon to the royal yacht, HMS Royal Sovereign.

In 1806, with a view to private practice, Outram went to Edinburgh, and there graduated doctor of medicine on 24 June 1809. He was admitted a licentiate of the Royal College of Physicians of London on 16 April 1810, and then began as a physician at Hanover Square in London, where he lived more than 40 years. He acted as physician to the Welbeck Street Dispensary. On 3 May 1838 he was elected a fellow of the Royal Society; he also became an early member of the Royal Geographical Society.

In 1841 Outram became medical inspector of her Majesty's fleets and hospitals. He was appointed Knight Commander of the Order of the Bath (KCB) on 17 September 1850, and was admitted a fellow of the Royal College of Physicians on 9 July 1852. He died at Brighton on 16 February 1856, and was buried at Clifton, Bristol. He was twice married.

== Works ==
Outram was author of:

- 'De Febre continuâ,' Edinburgh, 1809, dedicated to his uncle, Sir Thomas Outram of Kilham in Yorkshire.
- 'Suggestions to Naval Surgeons previous to, during, and after a Battle,' a pamphlet of which no copy seems accessible.

== Notes ==
Attribution

This article incorporates text from a publication now in the public domain: Lee, Sidney, ed. (1895). "Outram, Benjamin Fonseca". Dictionary of National Biography. Vol. 42. London: Smith, Elder & Co.
