= Admiral Jackson =

Admiral Jackson may refer to:

- Henry Jackson (Royal Navy officer) (1855–1929), British Royal Navy admiral
- Mary M. Jackson (born 1966), U.S. Navy vice admiral
- Richard H. Jackson (1866–1971), U.S. Navy admiral
- Ronny Jackson (born 1967), U.S. Navy rear admiral
- Samuel Jackson (Royal Navy officer) (1775–1845), British Royal Navy rear admiral
- Thomas Jackson (Royal Navy officer) (1868–1945), British Royal Navy admiral
- Thomas Sturges Jackson (1842–1934), British Royal Navy admiral
