= HMS Royal Sovereign (1804) =

Royal yacht of the British Monarchy in the 19th century

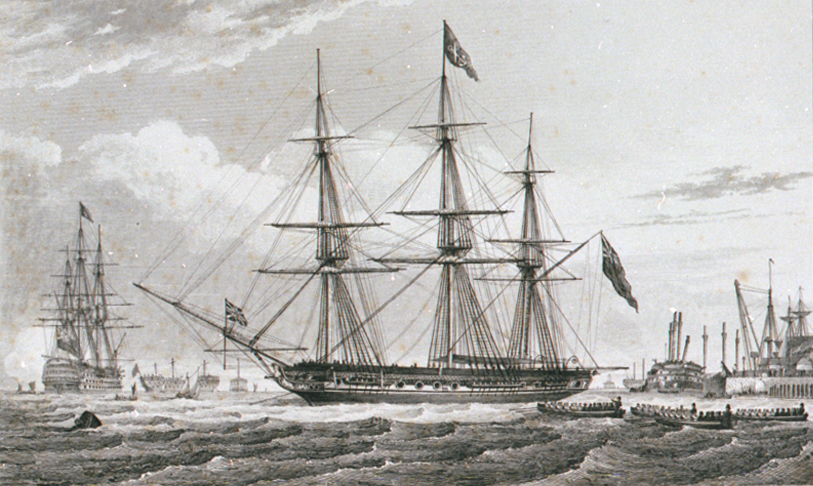
- Royal Sovereign on 2 August 1827

History

United Kingdom
- Name: HMS Royal Sovereign
- Ordered: 1800
- Builder: Edward Tippett until March 1803, then Henry Peake
- Laid down: November 1801
- Launched: 12 May 1804
- Fate: Broken up November 1849

General characteristics
- Tons burthen: 278 (bm)
- Length: 96 ft (29.3 m) (gundeck); 80 ft 5 in (25 m) (keel)
- Beam: 25 ft 6 in (8 m)
- Depth of hold: 10 ft 6 in (3.2 m)
- Propulsion: Sails
- Armament: 8 x swivel guns

HMS Royal Sovereign was one of the royal yachts of King George III. She was the largest of his yachts and served from 1804 until she was broken up in 1849.

== Design and construction ==
Royal Sovereign was one of two, the other being William and Mary, ship-rigged royal yachts designed by Sir John Henslow. Royal Sovereign was ordered in 1800 to be built at Deptford by Edward Tippett. In March 1803 the master shipwright in charge of construction changed from Tippett to Henry Peake. She was laid down in November 1801 and launched on 12 May 1804 with the following dimensions: 96 feet (29.3 m) along the gun deck, 80 feet 5 inches (24.5 m) at the keel, with a beam of 25 feet 6 inches (7.8 m) and a depth in the hold of 10 feet 6 inches (3.2 m). She measured 278 tons burthen. She was armed with eight small swivel guns. She was the largest yacht owned by King George III and was known to sail very well at sea.

== Service ==
From 31 August 1812 to 2 April 1814, she was under the command of William Hotham.

On 25 June 1814 a naval review was held at Spithead to celebrate the Treaty of Paris. The day after the review, the Prince Regent, King of Prussia, and Emperor of Russia embarked on Royal Sovereign and led the fifteen ships of the line and thirty-one frigates present out to sea. The royal party then left Royal Sovereign to go on board the fleet's flagship to witness battle manoeuvres.

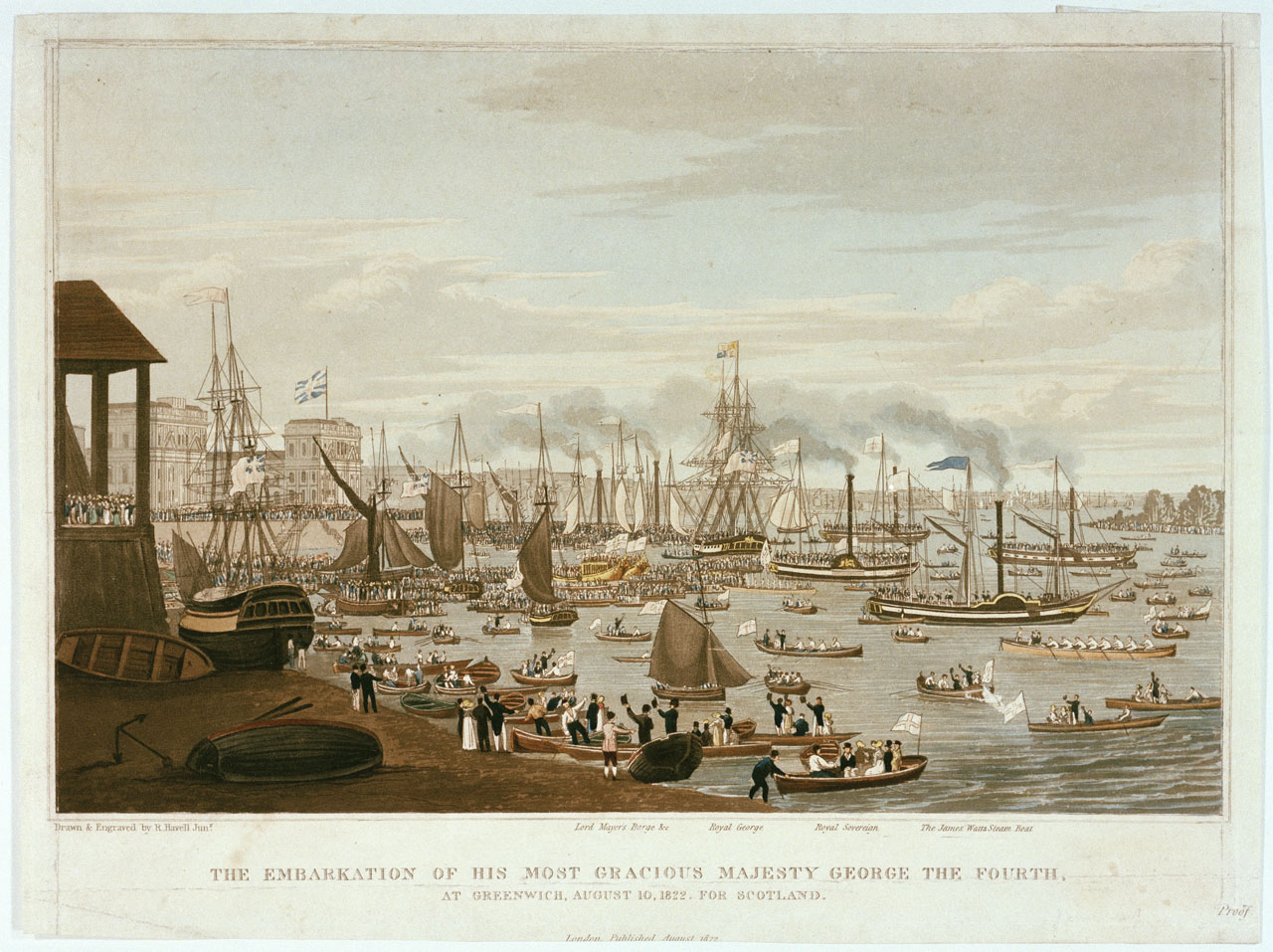
The embarkation of his most Gracious Majesty George the Fourth at Greenwich, 10 August 1822 for Scotland

In October 1824 Royal Sovereign was used by the Duke of Clarence for a tour of the fleet at Spithead, where the back-and-forth nature of the ship's sailing forced one warship, the brig sloop HMS Redwing, to fire the royal salute seven times. Clarence used the yacht to visit four ships on this occasion.

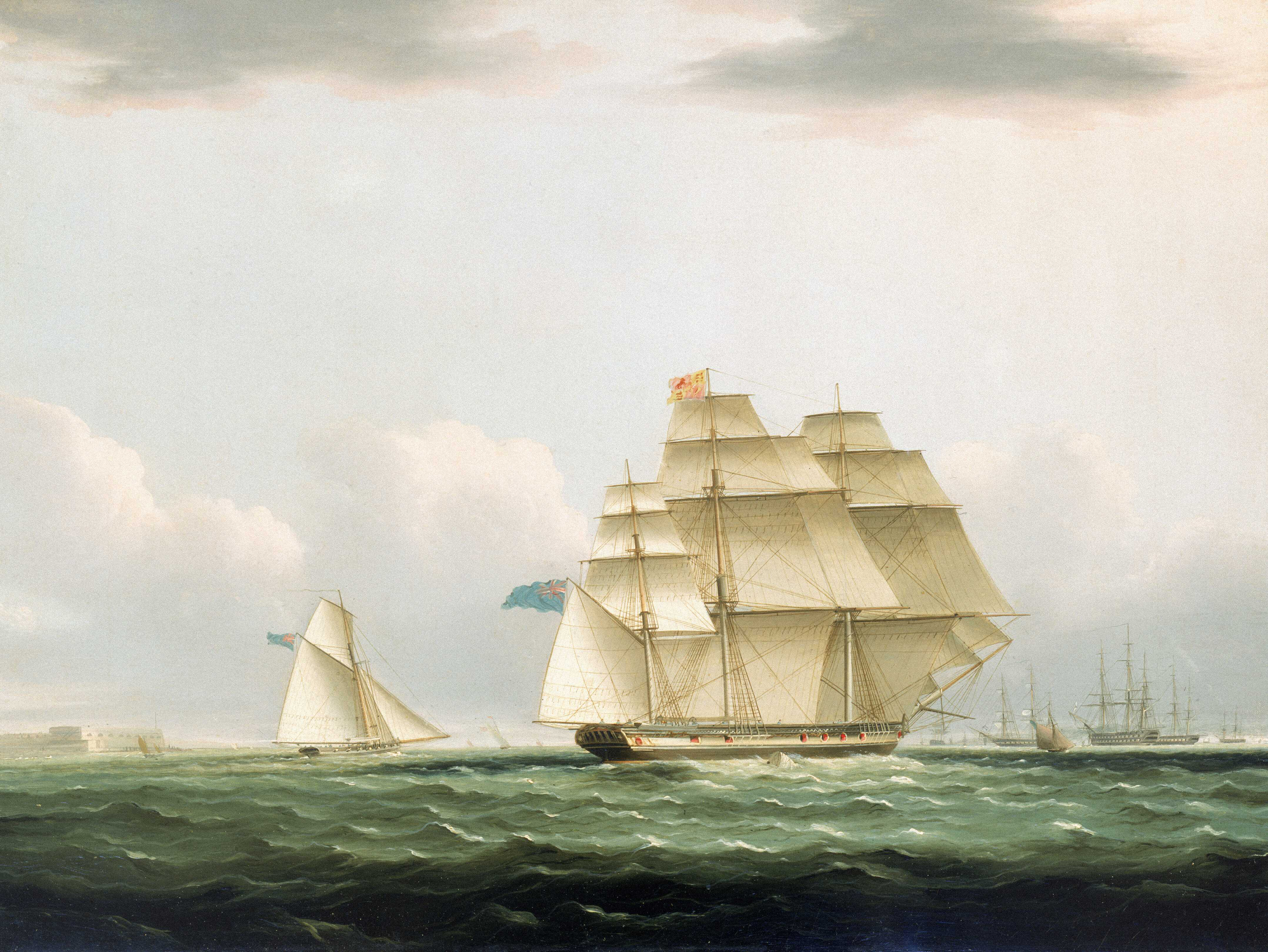
The yacht Royal Sovereign with the Duchess of Clarence on board, leaving Portsmouth to view the visiting Russian squadron anchored in Spithead, 8 August 1827

On 19 February 1838 Captain Samuel Jackson transferred from the ship of the line HMS Bellerophon to take command of Royal Sovereign. He was jointly captain of the yacht and captain-superintendent of Pembroke Dockyard. He stayed in command until he was promoted to rear-admiral on 23 November 1841.

Royal Sovereign was broken up at Pembroke Dockyard in November 1849.
