= All Saints' Church, Kilham =

Church in Kilham, East Riding of Yorkshire, England

Coordinates: 54.0646°N 0.3754°W

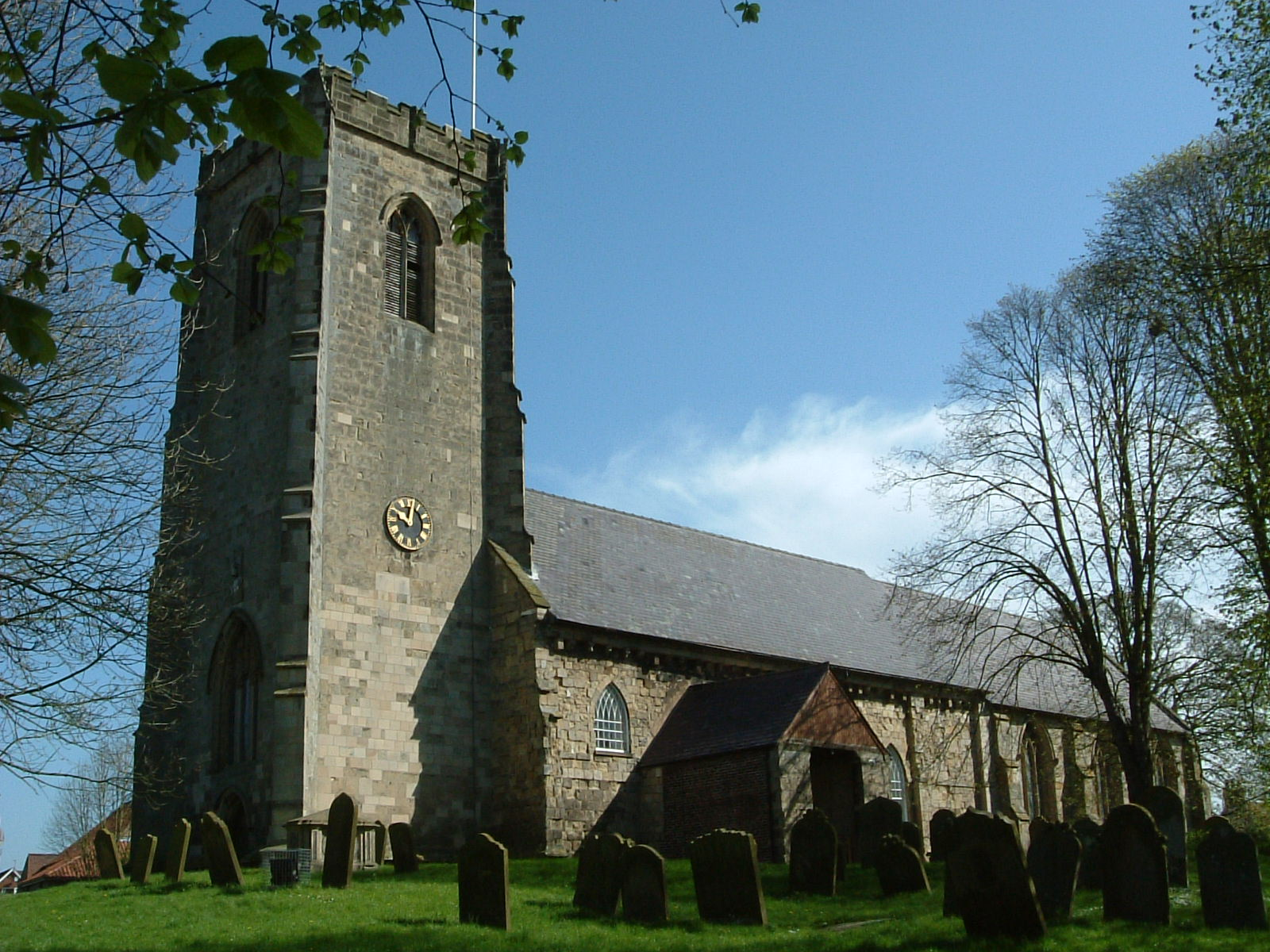
The church, in 2006

All Saints' Church is the parish church of Kilham, East Riding of Yorkshire, a village in England.

There was a church in Kilham at the start of the 12th century, but the oldest part of the current building is the nave, constructed later that century. The chancel was rebuilt in the early 14th century, and the tower was constructed in the 15th century. A porch was added in the 17th century and some of the nave windows were rebuilt between 1818 and 1821. The church did not have a major Victorian restoration, although Ewan Christian worked on the chancel and George Fowler Jones on the nave around 1865. The Corpus of Romanesque Sculpture in Britain & Ireland notes that it is "one of the largest of the earlier Wold churches and the wide nave is on its Norman plan, without aisles or chapels". The building was grade I listed in 1966.

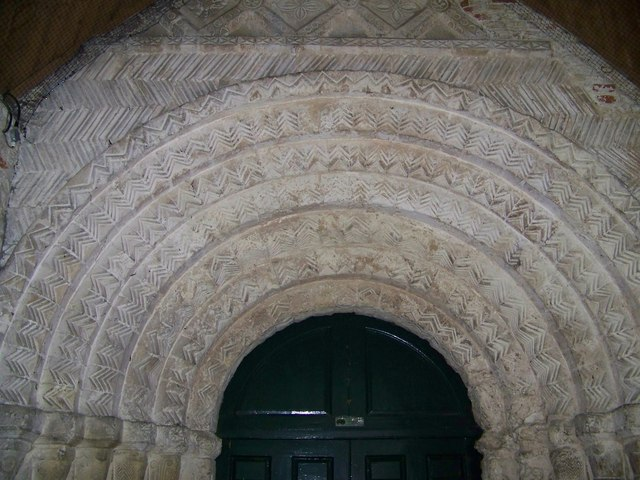
The south doorway

The church is built of stone with brick in the porch, and has slate roofs. The church consists of a nave, a south porch, a chancel and a west tower. The tower has three stages, with a chamfered plinth, diagonal buttresses, a pointed west doorway with a hood mould, a pointed three-light west window with a hood mould, over which is a heraldic shield, a crocketed ogee canopy, two-light pointed bell openings, and an embattled parapet. The porch contains benches, and the south doorway is Norman with five full orders on nook shafts with scalloped and carved capitals. Inside, there are three sedilia and a piscina, along with a 12th-century tub font.

== See also ==
- Grade I listed buildings in the East Riding of Yorkshire
- Listed buildings in Kilham, East Riding of Yorkshire
