= Kilham, East Riding of Yorkshire =

Village and civil parish in the East Riding of Yorkshire, England

Coordinates: 54°03′51″N 0°22′44″W

Kilham
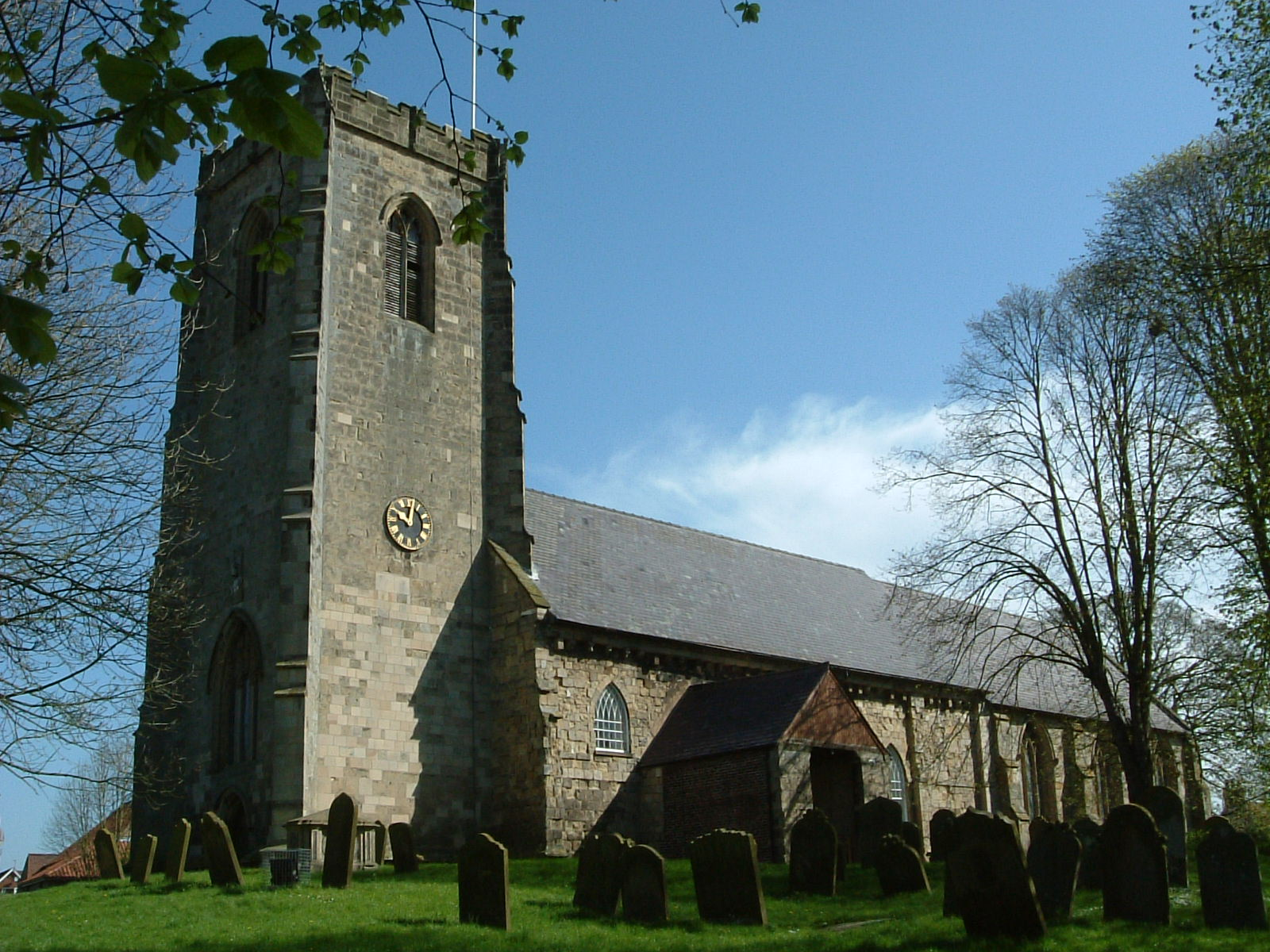
- All Saints Church

- Location within the East Riding of Yorkshire
- Population: 1,088 (2011 census)
- OS grid reference: TA0664
  - London: 175 mi (282 km) S
- Civil parish: Kilham
- Unitary authority: East Riding of Yorkshire
- Ceremonial county: East Riding of Yorkshire
- Region: Yorkshire and the Humber
- Country: England
- Sovereign state: United Kingdom
- Post town: DRIFFIELD
- Postcode district: YO25
- Dialling code: 01262
- Police: Humberside
- Fire: Humberside
- Ambulance: Yorkshire
- UK Parliament: Bridlington and the Wolds

Kilham is a village and civil parish in the East Riding of Yorkshire, England. It is situated about 5 miles (8 km) north-east of Driffield town centre. According to the 2011 UK census, Kilham parish had a population of 1,088, an increase on the 2001 UK census figure of 1,010.

== History ==
Kilham lies on the line of a Roman road from York to Bridlington, now followed by the minor road known as Woldgate. Pevsner notes that the village is more than a 1-mile (1.6 km) in length along this main street. To the south of Kilham there is evidence of a Romano-British settlement from the 4th century. The settlement is mentioned as Chillun in Domesday Book, though without a population. The name of the village derives from the Old English Cylnum, meaning at the kilns.

Kilham, which lies in a narrow valley on the southern edge of the Wolds, was once an important market town in the Yorkshire Wolds, bigger and more important than Driffield at one time. It held annual trading fairs and had a large number of businesses and a considerable population. The town declined in size and status following the building of the Driffield Navigation, which took trade away from Kilham to nearby Driffield. However the village was already floundering in terms of trade long before the canal was cut.

In 1823 Kilham civil parish was in the Wapentake of Dickering and the Liberty of St Peter's. A market had previously been held on Thursdays. The parish church was under the patronage of the Dean of York. A mineral spring near the road to Rudston was supposed curative for disorders. A further spring, called Henpit Hole, was near the road to Langtoft; during a wet autumn it would spout with "violence". A Methodist chapel was first built in 1789 and a Baptist chapel existed in the village by 1819. The population at the time was 971.

Occupations included twenty-two farmers, seven shoemakers, five grocers, three of whom were also drapers, four blacksmiths, four tailors, four bricklayers, three joiners, two butchers, two glove makers, a brick & tile maker, a draper, a bacon factor (wholesale tradesman), a plumber & glazier, a bookseller, a saddler, a fellmonger, a corn miller, a gardener & seedsman, and the landlords of the Royal Oak, Plough, Star, and Black Bull public houses. Within the parish were two surgeons, a schoolmaster, four gentlemen and two gentlewomen, a Baptist minister, a curate and a vicar, a yeoman, an Esquire, two Royal Navy masters and a Royal Navy lieutenant. Two carriers operated between the village and Driffield, Beverley, Hull, and Bridlington once a week.

== Community ==
The Grade I listed Anglican All Saints' Church, Kilham is the parish church. The church holds an annual flower festival. Outside the church is a grade II listed tethering ring in a stone block – evidence of the cattle trade and bull-baiting that once took place in the village. There is also a cast-iron water pump opposite the church.

At one time there were six schools in the village but only one now remains, Kilham C. of E. primary school, which was rated as good by Ofsted in 2015. In 1633 Lord John Darcy of Aston opened a grammar school in the village. It was closed by 1880 when the site was redeveloped as a temperance hall.

In 2010 the Kilham Playing Field Association opened a recreational playing field on Back Lane to provide a full-sized football pitch, a 5-a-side football pitch, grass tennis courts, adventure playground and cycle track. The Association, a registered charity, has been funded locally and through the Big Lottery fund and Grassroots.

== Notable residents ==
- David Byas, the former Yorkshire cricket captain, is from Kilham.
- Sir Benjamin Fonseca Outram, naval surgeon, was born in Kilham in 1770
- Sir Henry Thompson, Lord Mayor of York (1663 & 1672), Deputy Lieutenant of the West Riding of Yorkshire (1665) and MP for York (1673–1873) was born in Kilham.

== See also ==
- Listed buildings in Kilham, East Riding of Yorkshire
