= Listed buildings in Kilham, East Riding of Yorkshire =

Kilham is a civil parish in the county of the East Riding of Yorkshire, England. It contains 15 listed buildings that are recorded in the National Heritage List for England. Of these, one is listed at Grade I, the highest of the three grades, and the others are at Grade II, the lowest grade. The parish contains the village of Kilham and the surrounding area, and all the listed buildings are in the village. Most of these are houses, and the others include a church, a bull ring, a war memorial, and a telephone kiosk.

== Key ==
Grade	Criteria
I	Buildings of exceptional interest, sometimes considered to be internationally important
II	Buildings of national importance and special interest

== Buildings ==
Name and location	Photograph	Date	Notes	Grade
All Saints' Church; 54.06468°N 0.37532°W		12th century	The church has been altered and extended through the centuries. It is built in stone with brick in the porch, and has slate roofs. The church consists of a nave, a south porch, a chancel and a west tower. The tower has three stages, with a chamfered plinth, diagonal buttresses, a pointed west doorway with a hood mould, a pointed three-light west window with a hood mould, over which is a heraldic shield, a crocketed ogee canopy, two-light pointed bell openings, and an embattled parapet. The porch contains benches, and the south doorway is Norman with five full orders on nook shafts with scalloped and carved capitals.	I
Hall Farmhouse; 54.06474°N 0.37373°W		1716	The house is in red brick on a plinth, with angle pilasters, a partial moulded string course, a moulded eaves cornice, and a slate roof. Thee are two storeys and attics, and five bays, the middle bay projecting slightly. The central round-arched doorway has stone volutes, a semicircular fanlight with intersecting glazing, and a keystone, over which is a recessed panel with the date and a heraldic motif. The windows are sashes with flat gauged brick arches, and above is a coped pediment containing a Diocletian window, the outer lights blocked.	II
Orchard House; 54.06477°N 0.37470°W		Early 18th century	The house is in whitewashed brick on chalk, with a dentilled brick eaves cornice, and a pantile roof with tumbled-in brick to the raised gables with kneelers. There is one storey and attics, and three bays. Steps lead up to the doorway that has pilasters and a shallow cornice, flanked by sash windows under segmental brick arches. To the right is a former shopfront, the central doorway converted into a window under a radial fanlight, flanked by bow windows, all in fluted architraves. In the attic are swept dormers with casement windows.	II
The Saddlers; 54.06411°N 0.37497°W		Mid-18th century	The house is in red brick, with a floor band, a stepped eaves cornice, and a pantile roof with tumbled-in brick to the raised gables. There are two storeys and three bays. Five steps with cast iron handrails lead up to a central doorway that has a rectangular fanlight under a flat gauged brick arch. This is flanked by later canted bay windows, and on the upper floor are sash windows in architraves under flat gauged brick arches. Mounted on each side of the doorway are saddler's lasts.	II
Rutland House; 54.06409°N 0.37613°W		1764	The house is in red brick, with stone dressings, a floor band, a dentilled brick eaves cornice, and a pantile roof with tumbled-in brick to the raised gables. There are two storeys and attics, and three bays. On the left is a garage. The doorway to the right is flanked by sash windows, all with flat gauged brick arches and keystones, the keystone over the door with initials and the date. On the upper floor the windows are horizontally sliding sashes.	II
Belgrave Lodge and walls 54.06431°N 0.37913°W	—	Late 18th century	The house is in red-brown brick, with stone dressings, a stepped eaves cornice and a pantile roof with tumbled-in brick on the raised gables. There are two storeys and three bays, and a later single-storey wing to the right. The central doorway has attached fluted columns, a fanlight in panelled reveals, and an open pediment. The windows are sashes, those in the ground flor of the main block with wedge lintels. Projecting at right angles to the main range are ramped wing walls with stone copings, ending in square abutments.	II
Clackna Farmhouse; 54.06476°N 0.37325°W	—	Late 18th century	The house is in rendered brick on a plinth, with a floor band and a pantile roof with raised gables. There are two storeys and three bays. The central doorway has pilasters and a pediment, and the windows are sashes.	II
Eastgate House; 54.06490°N 0.37351°W		Late 18th century	The house is in rendered brick on a plinth, with a timber eaves cornice on paired brackets, and a pantile roof with raised coped gables and kneelers. There are two storeys and attics, three bays and rear extensions. The central round-headed doorway has pilasters with roundels, an entablature, and a semicircular fanlight with radial glazing in panelled reveals. The windows are sashes.	II
High Farmhouse; 54.06483°N 0.38280°W		Late 18th century	The house is in brick, with stone dressings, a floor band, a dentilled brick eaves cornice, and a pantile roof with tumbled-in brick to the raised gables. There are two storeys and attics, three bays, and a rear wing. Three sandstone steps lead up to the central doorway; and the windows are sashes; all the openings have flat gauged brick arches and keystones.	II
The Cottage; 54.06408°N 0.37593°W		Late 18th century	The house is in red brick, with a stepped brick eaves cornice, and a pantile roof with tumbled-in brick to the raised gables with kneelers. There are two storeys, two bays, and a rear wing. The central doorway has a rectangular fanlight, the windows are sashes in architraves, and all the openings have cambered wedge lintels.	II
Manor Lodge; 54.06433°N 0.37979°W	—	Early 19th century	The house is in variegated red and yellow brick, with stone dressings, a stepped brick eaves cornice on paired timber brackets, and a pantile roof. Thee are two storeys and attics, and three bays. The central doorway has pilasters, a semicircular fanlight with radial glazing in panelled reveals, and a cornice. The windows are sashes, those on the ground floor under flat gauged brick arches.	II
The Elms; 54.06429°N 0.37803°W	—	Early 19th century	The house is in brown brick, with a stepped eaves cornice and a hipped pantile roof. There are two storeys and three bays, and a lower single-bay extension on the right. The central doorway has fluted pilasters, a fanlight with radial glazing, and an open pediment. The windows are sashes, those on the ground floor of the main block under wedge lintels, and on the upper floor with flat timber lintels.	II
Bull ring 54.06454°N 0.37486°W		19th century (probable)	The bull ring consists of a sandstone block with a centrally-placed iron staple and ring.	II
War Memorial; 54.06434°N 0.37545°W		1921	The war memorial is in the churchyard of All Saints' Church, to the south of the church. It is in Portland stone, and consists of a wheel cross on a tapered octagonal shaft. This stands on a tapered plinth on a base of three steps. The plinth has a cornice, and inset panels with inscriptions and the names of those lost in the First World War. In front is a sandstone open book with the dates, and the names of those lost in the Second World War.	II
Telephone kiosk 54.06423°N 0.37626°W		1935	The telephone kiosk in Church Street is of the K6 type designed by Giles Gilbert Scott. Constructed in cast iron with a square plan and a dome, it has three unperforated crowns in the top panels.	II
