= HMS Harpy =

Five ships of the Royal Navy have been named Harpy.

- HMS Harpy (1777) was launched at Liverpool, the Navy having purchased her on the stocks. In 1799 she was converted to a fireship. The Navy sold her in 1783 and she became a whaler and a merchantman sailing for the Sierra Leone Company. The French Navy captured her in 1794 and they employed her as Harcourt and later Hardie. The French Navy struck her from the lists in 1796.
- HMS Harpy (1796) – a brig-sloop in service 1796–1817.
- HMS Harpy (1825) – a brig-sloop in service 1825–1841
- HMS Harpy (1845) – a gunboat in service 1845–1892
- HMS Harpy (1909) – a Beagle-class torpedo boat destroyer in service 1910–1921

== See also ==
- HMRC Harpy – a cutter in service 1816–1848.
