= HMS Waterloo (1818) =

Ship of the line of the Royal Navy

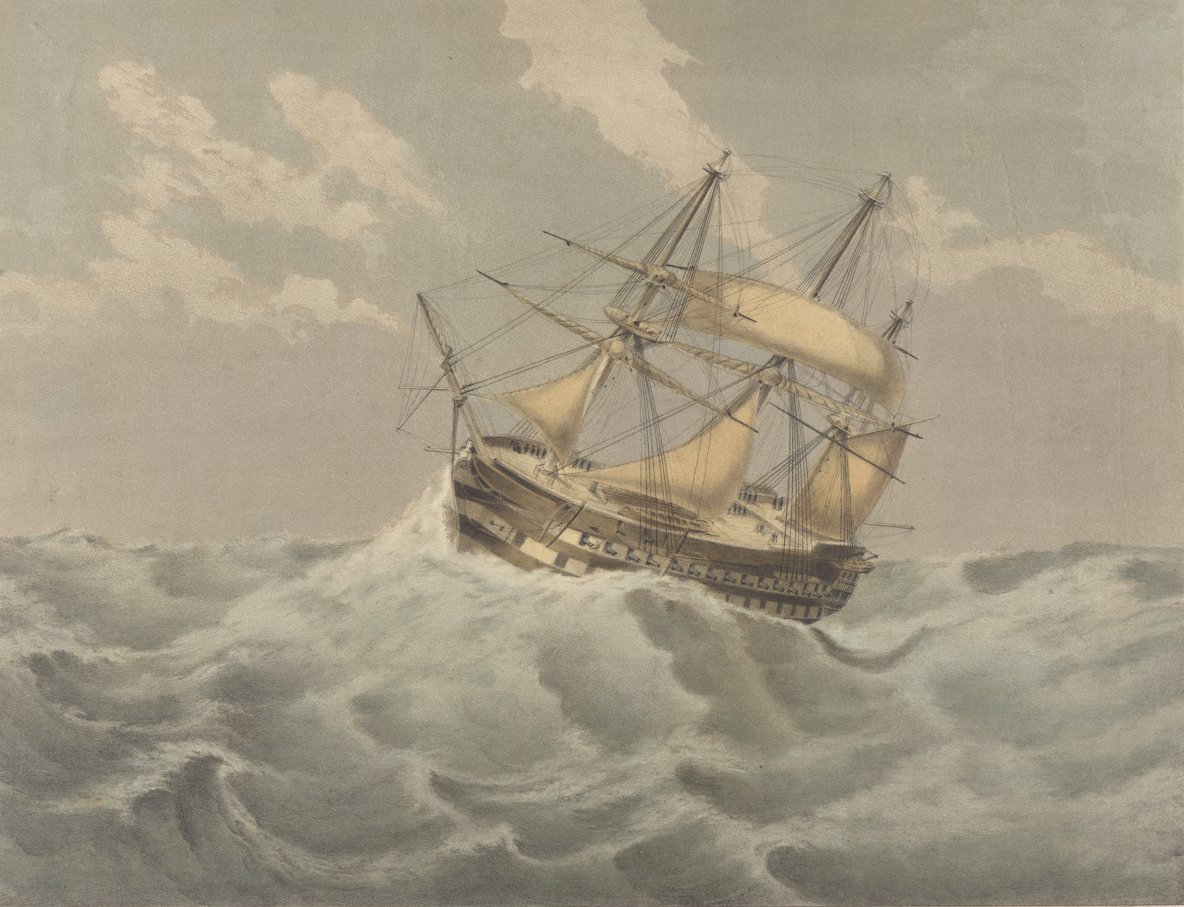
- The then HMS Bellerophon, 50 miles off the coast of Malta, c. 1852

History

United Kingdom
- Name: HMS Waterloo
- Ordered: 1809
- Builder: Portsmouth Dockyard
- Laid down: November 1813
- Launched: 16 October 1818
- Renamed: HMS Bellerophon, 1824
- Fate: Sold, 1892

General characteristics
- Class & type: 80-gun third rate ship of the line
- Tons burthen: 2041 bm
- Length: 192 ft (59 m) (gundeck)
- Beam: 49 ft (15 m)
- Depth of hold: 21 ft (6.4 m)
- Propulsion: Sails
- Sail plan: Full-rigged ship
- Armament: 80 guns: Gundeck: 30 × 32 pdrs; Upper gundeck: 32 × 18 pdrs; Quarterdeck: 4 × 12 pdrs, 10 × 32 pdr carronades; Forecastle: 2 × 12 pdrs, 2 × 32 pdr carronades

HMS Waterloo was an 80-gun third-rate ship of the line, launched on 16 October 1818 at Portsmouth. She was designed by Henry Peake, and built by Nicholas Diddams at Portsmouth Dockyard and was the only ship built to her draught. She had originally been ordered as HMS Talavera, but was renamed on the stocks after the Battle of Waterloo.

In 1824 Waterloo was renamed HMS Bellerophon. She formed part of an experimental squadron, which were groups of ships sent out in the 1830s and 1840s to test new techniques of ship design, armament, building and propulsion.

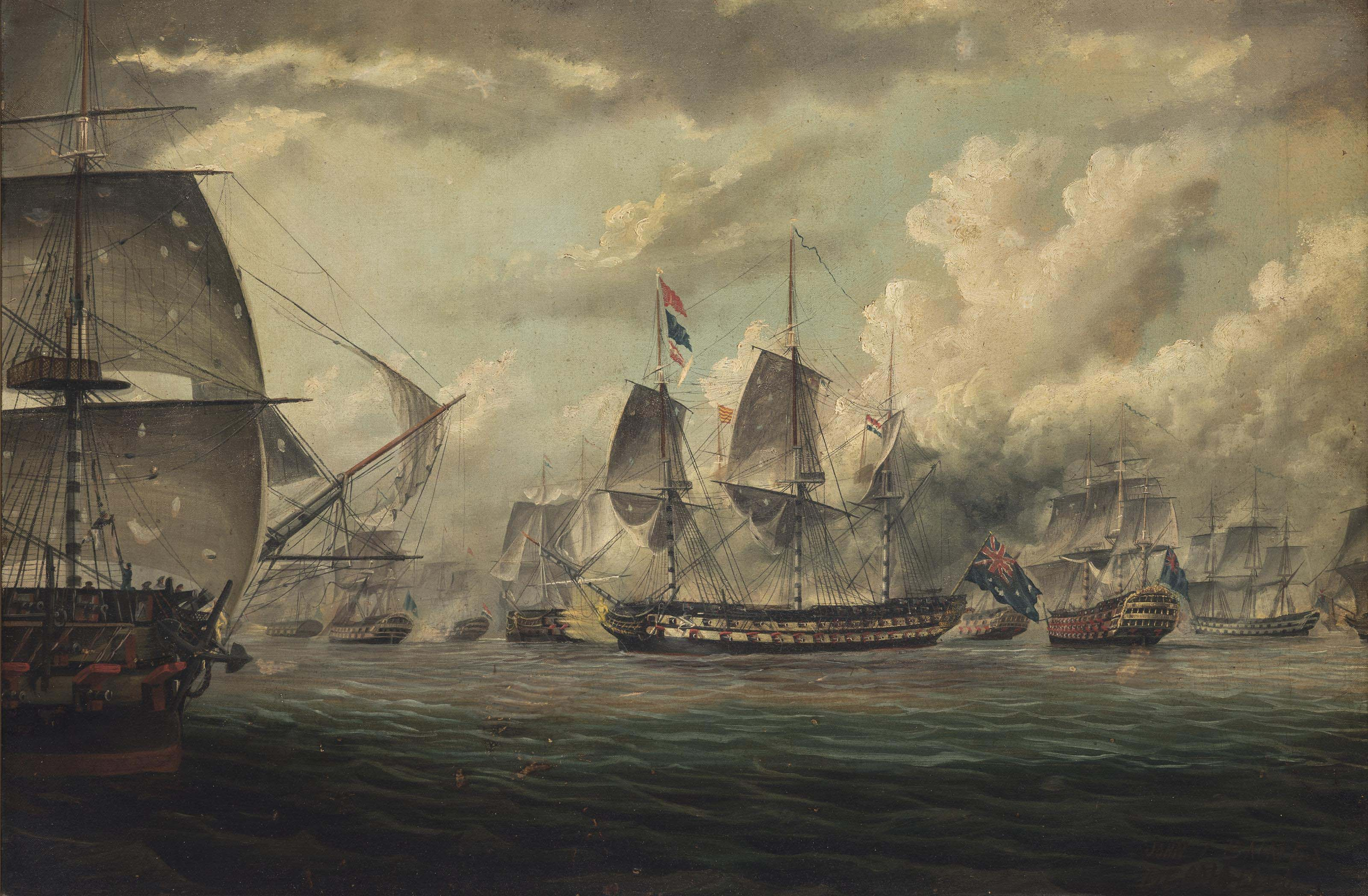
Bellerophon leading the bombardment of the Syrian fortress of Acre on 3 November 1840. Thomas Baines

She served as flagship to Rear Admiral Sir Charles Paget from 1836 to 1838.

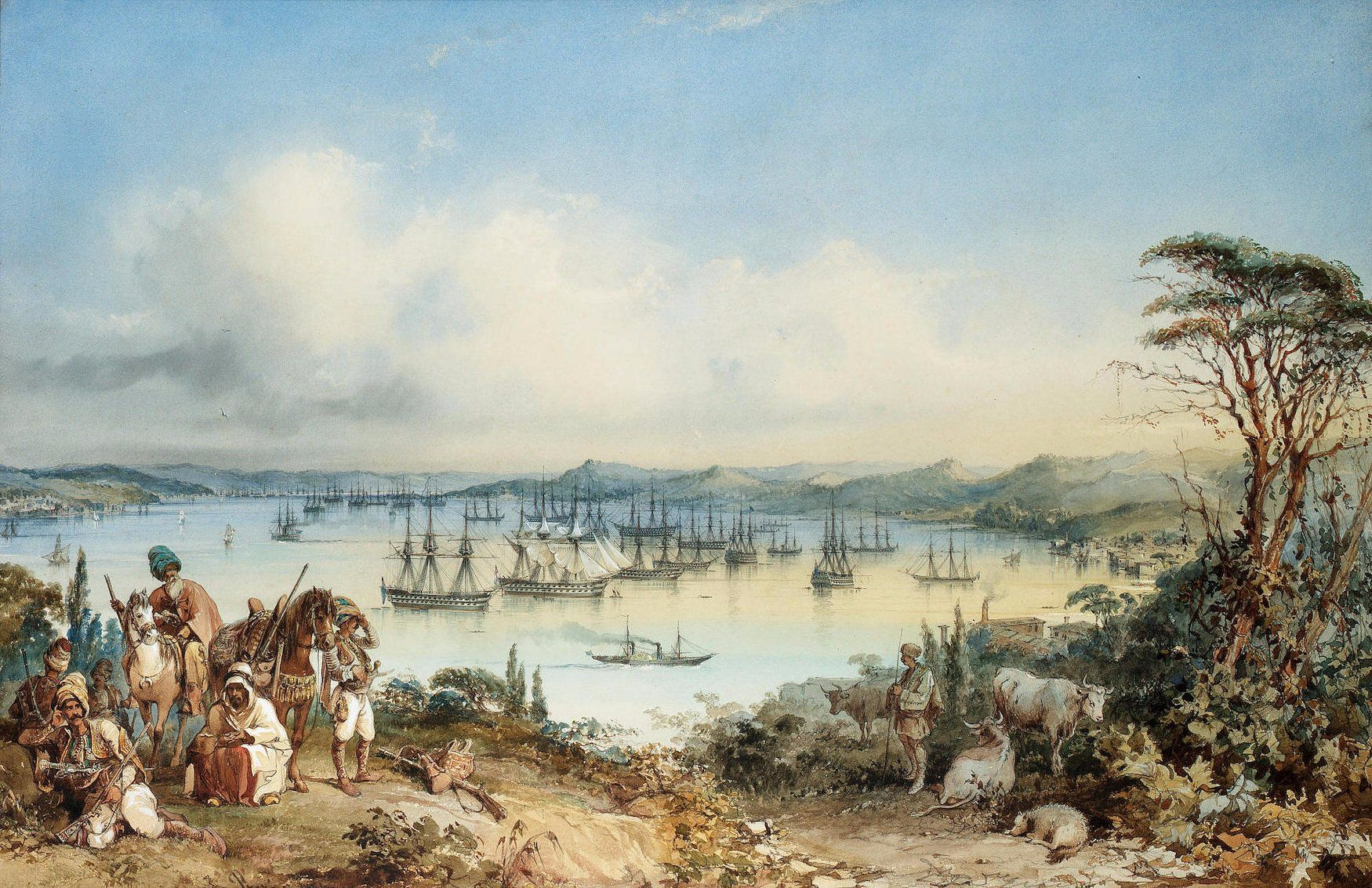
Waterloo and the Allied Fleets anchored in the Bosphorus, late 1853; the prelude to the Crimean war. Amedeo Preziosi

Her only meaningful military activity was the bombardment of Sebastopol in June 1854 during the Crimean War.

She was placed on harbour service as a receiving ship in Portsmouth in 1856, and was sold in 1892 to J. Read jr. for breaking up.

== Figurehead ==
The original figurehead attached to the bow of the ship was reported by the Hampshire Telegraph to be a full-length representation of Arthur Wellesley, 1st Duke of Wellington, celebrated for his involvement in the defeat of Tipu Sultan during the Anglo-Mysore wars in 1799, and the ending of the Napoleonic Wars in 1815. The original carving was created by 'Messrs Hellyer & Co. at Portsmouth', also known as Hellyer & Sons. The ship was first named HMS Waterloo, the choice of name honoured the Duke of Wellington's victory at the Battle of Waterloo.

When the ship was renamed, the figurehead of the Duke was no longer appropriate. By the 1820s, figureheads as extravagant as that carved for the first HMS Bellerophon in 1786 were not permitted, largely due to their high costs and the Admiralty's desire to phase out the carvings completely. The new figurehead was a simple bust depicting a warrior figure, and while the carver is unidentified, it is likely to have been carved by a later member of the Hellyer family.

The figurehead can be seen on display at the National Museum of the Royal Navy, Portsmouth.
