= List of female art museum directors =

This is a list of female art museum directors.

== List ==
Name	Dates	Museum	Country	Tenure
Julia Alexander	1967–2025	Walters Art Museum	United States	2013–2024
Hope Alswang		Rhode Island School of Design Museum Norton Museum of Art	United States	2000s
Rael Artel		Tartu Art Museum	Estonia	2000s
Liz Andrews		Spelman College Museum of Fine Art	United States	2021–present
Jacquelynn Baas		Hood Museum of Art; University Art Museum, Berkeley	United States	1980s and 1990s
Maria Balshaw		Whitworth, University of Manchester and Manchester City Galleries; Tate	United Kingdom	2006–2017; 2017-
Ivy Barsky		National Museum of American Jewish History	United States	2000s
Jane Bledsoe		Georgia Museum of Art	United States	1980s
Jean Sutherland Boggs	1922–2014	National Gallery of Canada	Canada	1960s–1970s
Patricia Bovey		Winnipeg Art Gallery	Canada	2000s
Adelyn Dohme Breeskin	1896–1986	Baltimore Museum of Art	United States	1930s
Elizabeth Broun	born 1946	Spencer Museum of Art; Smithsonian American Art Museum	United States	1982–1983; 1989–2016
Andrea Barnwell Brownlee		Spelman College Museum of Fine Art (2001–2020) Cummer Museum of Art (2020–present)	United States	2001–present
Johanna Burton		Museum of Contemporary Art, Los Angeles	United States	2022–present
Connie Butler		MoMA PS1	United States	2023–present
Mary Schmidt Campbell	born 1948	Studio Museum in Harlem	United States	1980s
Naomi Cass	born 1957	Centre for Contemporary Photography	Australia	2004–2018
Naomi Cass	born 1957	Castlemaine Art Museum	Australia	2008–2025
Betty Churcher	1931–2015	National Gallery of Australia	Australia	1990 –1997
Melissa Chiu	born 1972	Asia Society	United States	2000s
Annette Cone-Skelton	born 1942	Museum of Contemporary Art of Georgia	United States	2000–present
Jo-Anne Birnie Danzker		Vancouver Art Gallery; Frye Art Museum	Canada	1980s
Barbara Knowles Debs		New-York Historical Society	United States	1980s
Laurence des Cars		Louvre	France	2021–present
Rhana Devenport		Govett-Brewster Art Gallery; Auckland Art Gallery	New Zealand	2006–2013; 2013–present
Anne d'Harnoncourt	1943–2008	Philadelphia Museum of Art	United States	1980s
Claire Doherty		Arnolfini	United Kingdom	2017–present
Anne Ellegood		Institute of Contemporary Art, Los Angeles	United States	2019–present
Charlotte Eyerman		JPMorgan Chase Art Collection (2017-) Monterey Museum of Art (2013–16) FRAME (French Regional & American Museums Exchange) (2010–2013) Gagosian Gallery, Beverly Hills (2009–2010)	United States	2000s
Susan Fereday	born 1959	Centre for Contemporary Photography	Australia	1992–1995
Silvia Filippini-Fantoni	born 1974	Westmoreland Museum of American Art	United States	2023–present
Juliana R. Force	1876–1948	Whitney Museum of American Art	United States	1930s
Thelma Golden	born 1966	Studio Museum in Harlem	United States	2000s–present
Claudia Gould	born 1956	Institute of Contemporary Art; Jewish Museum	United States	2000s
Andrea Gyorody		Frederick R. Weisman Museum of Art	United States	2021–2025
Jenny Harper		Museum of New Zealand Te Papa Tongarewa; Christchurch Art Gallery	New Zealand	1990–1992; 2006–2018
Merle Hathaway	born 1944	Horsham Regional Art Gallery	Australia	1997–2008
Anne Hawley		Isabella Stewart Gardner Museum	United States	1980s
Alanna Heiss	born 1943	P.S.1 now MoMA PS1	United States	1970s
Karin Hindsbo	born 1974	Tate Modern	United Kingdom	2023–present
Rebecca Alban Hoffberger		American Visionary Art Museum	United States	2000s
Tessa Jackson	born 1955	Arnolfini	United Kingdom	1991–1999
Ethel Bowditch Jones	1906–1990	Fitchburg Art Museum (fmly Fitchburg Art Center)	United States	1929–1933
Dorothy Kosinski		The Phillips Collection	United States	2000s
Florence Nightingale Levy	1870–1947	Baltimore Museum of Art	United States	1920s
Peggy Loar		Corcoran Gallery of Art	United States	2000s
Dorothy Mayhall	1925–1995	Aldrich Contemporary Art Museum; Storm King Art Center	United States	1960s–1970s
Elizabeth Ann Macgregor		Museum of Contemporary Art	Australia	1999–2021
Amy Meyers		Yale Center for British Art	United States	2002–2019
Louise Mirrer		New-York Historical Society	United States	2000s
Lulu F. Miller	1916–1930	Muskegon Museum of Art	United States	1910s
Agnes Mongan	1905–1996	Harvard Art Museums	United States	1940s
Grace Morley	1900–1985	San Francisco Museum of Modern Art	United States	1930s
Frances Morris	born 1959	Tate Modern	United Kingdom	2016–2023
Jessica F. Nicoll		Smith College Museum of Art	United States	2000s
Helen Ogilvie	1902–1993	Stanley Coe Gallery	Australia	1949–1954
Maudie Palmer	1944–2025	Heide Museum of Modern Art	Australia	1981–1996
Maudie Palmer	1944–2025	TarraWarra Museum of Art	Australia	1999–2009, 2011
Anne Pasternak		Brooklyn Museum	United States	2000s
Sharon Patton	born 1944	Allen Memorial Art Museum	United States	2000s
Ann Philbin		Hammer Museum	United States	1990s
Lisa Phillips		New Museum of Contemporary Art	United States	2000s
Mary Platt		Hilbert Museum of California Art	United States	2000s
Anne Poulet		The Frick Collection	United States	2000s
Yelena Pronicheva		Tretyakov Gallery	Russian Federation	2023–present
Karen Quinlan		Bendigo Art Gallery	Australia	2000–2018
Karen Quinlan		National Portrait Gallery	Australia	2018–2022
Hilla von Rebay	1890–1967	Solomon R. Guggenheim Museum	United States	1930s
Anne-Imelda Radice	born 1948	National Museum of Women in the Arts; American Folk Art Museum	United States	1983–1989; 2012–2022
Suhanya Raffel		M+	Hong Kong	2016–present
Katharine Lee Reid		Cleveland Museum of Art	United States	2000–2005
Joan Rosenbaum		Jewish Museum (Manhattan)	United States	1980s
Amy Sadao		Institute of Contemporary Art, Philadelphia	United States	2000s
Cornelia Bentley Sage	1876 or 1880–1936	Albright-Knox Gallery	United States	1910s
Katrina Sedgwick		Australian Centre for the Moving Image	Australia	2015–present
Hsio-yen Shih	1933–2001	National Gallery of Canada	Canada	1970s
Victoria Siddall		National Portrait Gallery, London	United Kingdom	2024–present
Rochelle Slovin		Museum of the Moving Image	United States	1980s
Treania Smith	1901–1990	Macquarie Galleries	Australia	1938–1979
Cheryll Sotheran		Govett-Brewster Art Gallery; Dunedin Public Art Gallery; Museum of New Zealand Te Papa Tongarewa	New Zealand	1986–1989; 1989–1992; 1992–2002
Susan Fisher Sterling		National Museum of Women in the Arts	United States	2000s
Lowery Stokes Sims		Studio Museum in Harlem	United States	2000s
Stephanie Stebich	born 1966	Tacoma Art Museum; Smithsonian American Art Museum	United States	2005–2017; 2017–present
Sasha Suda		Philadelphia Museum	Canada	2022–present
Martha Tedeschi	born 1958	Harvard Art Museums	United States	2016–present
Shirley Thomson	1930–2010	National Gallery of Canada	Canada	1987–97
Zelfira Tregulova		Tretyakov Gallery	Russian Federation	2015–2023
Joyce Tsai		The Clyfford Still Museum	United States	2021–present
Marcia Tucker	1940–2006	New Museum of Contemporary Art	United States	1980s
Olga Viso		Hirshhorn Museum and Sculpture Garden; Walker Art Center	United States	2000s
Roslyn Walker		National Museum of African Art	United States	1990s
Zoé Whitley	born 1979	Chisenhale Gallery	United Kingdom	2020–present
Sylvia H. Williams		National Museum of African Art	United States	1980s
Beatrice Winser		Newark Museum	United States	1920s
Heidi Zuckerman		Aspen Art Museum; Orange County Museum of Art	United States	2005–2019; 2021–present
