= Nancy Elizabeth Prophet =

American sculptor

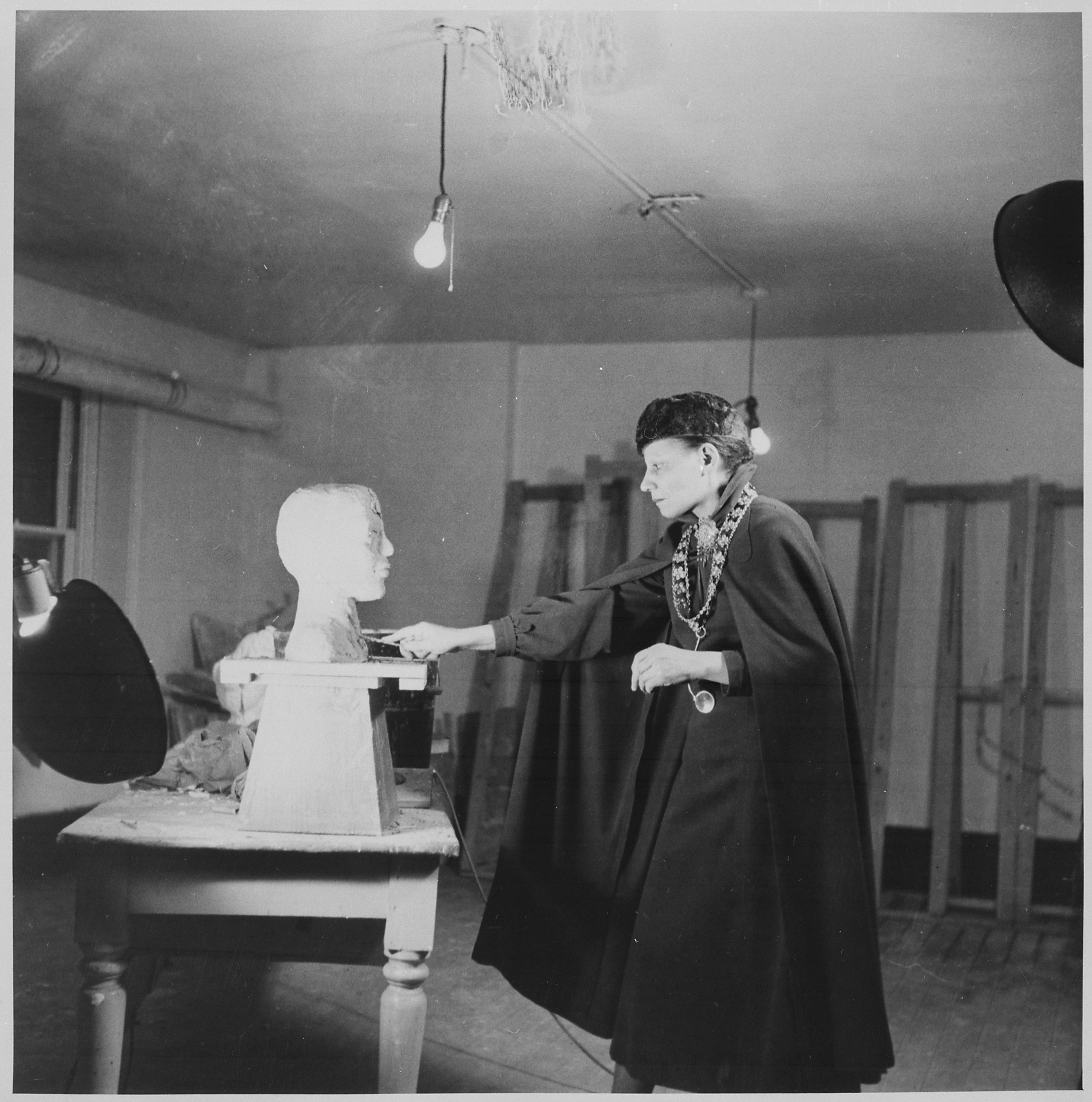
- Elizabeth Prophet, sculptor and teacher (Harmon Foundation)
- Born: Nancy Elizabeth Profitt; March 19, 1890; Warwick, Rhode Island, US
- Died: December 13, 1960 (aged 70); Providence, Rhode Island, US
- Education: Rhode Island School of Design
- Known for: Sculptor
- Movement: New Negro movement
- Spouse: Francis Ford (m. 1915; div. 1932)

Nancy Elizabeth Prophet (born Nancy Elizabeth Profitt; March 19, 1890 – December 13, 1960) was an American artist of African-American and Native American ancestry, known for her sculpture. She was the first African-American graduate from the Rhode Island School of Design in 1918 and later studied at L'Ecole des Beaux-Arts in Paris during the early 1920s. She became noted for her work in Paris in the 1920s and 1930s. In 1934, Prophet began teaching at Spelman College, expanding the curriculum to include modeling and history of art and architecture. Prophet died in 1960 at the age of 70.

Prophet faced many struggles through her lifetime. Prophet had a difficult time financing her work and appealed to various foundations for funding and was often turned down. She also struggled with having her work exhibited and at times using the name Eli Prophet when she entered works into exhibition. Throughout her time in Paris, Prophet was constantly on the brink of starvation. Nevertheless, Prophet retained a strong work ethic passed down from her parents. A perfectionist who did all her own carving, her surviving output is small.

== Biography ==
=== Early life ===
Nancy Elizabeth Profitt was born on March 19, 1890, in Warwick, Rhode Island, to William H. Profitt and Rosa E. Walker Profitt. (She changed the spelling of her last name to Prophet in 1932.) She was the second of three children and the only daughter of her parents. Her parents were of mixed Native American and African American ancestry; her father was Narragansett.

From an early age, Prophet demonstrated a serious interest in drawing and painting. Where her interest in these fields originated from is still unknown. At the time, her parents considered her creative leanings to be impractical. Her parents were proponents of hard work; her mother was a cook and her father was a city worker. They passed their hard work ethic onto their daughter, expecting her to eventually work as a housekeeper or teacher. Despite this pressure, Prophet still found time to pursue her creative passions. When she was 15 years old, Prophet used her small earnings from a part-time housekeeping job to pay for art tutoring.

After graduating from high school, Prophet remained in Rhode Island. For five years, she worked as a domestic in private homes in Providence. Following this, she worked at a local law office as a stenographer. Using the wages earned by these two jobs, Prophet was able to attend art school.

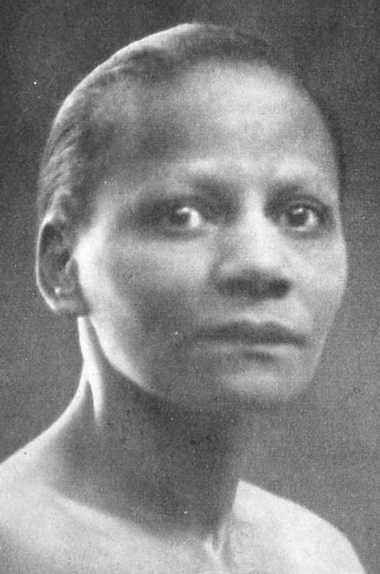
Prophet, from a 1929 profile in The Crisis

=== Life at RISD ===
In 1914, at the age of 24, Prophet enrolled in the Rhode Island School of Design in Providence, Rhode Island. She was the only African American student amongst a predominantly white female school population. Despite this, Prophet integrated herself well both academically and socially.

In 1915, during her sophomore year, Prophet married Francis Ford, who had briefly attended Brown University. Ford was ten years Prophet's senior and worked as a waiter at a restaurant in Providence while Prophet continued her studies at RISD. They had no children and eventually separated in 1932.

While at RISD, Prophet studied painting and free-hand drawing, especially portraiture. She graduated from the school in 1918.

=== Post-Graduation ===
During the following year after her graduation, Prophet took additional courses in sculpture at RISD. At this time, Prophet was living in a rooming house with both her husband and recently widowed father. She attempted to work as a portrait painter full-time but was not successful. Unable to get any exhibitions or gallery representation, she ended up painting only a few portraits of Providence residents. Prophet returned once again to domestic work in order to earn funds to travel to France in 1922.

=== Work in Paris ===
Prophet moved to Paris in 1922 to study sculpture. Most of the evidence for the twelve years she spent in France comes from her diary, a forty-six page hand-written manuscript, in which she portrays periods of intense activity contrasting with periods of extreme depression. Although she claimed to have studied at the École des Beaux-Arts, they have no record of her, and she probably studied at one of the connected ateliers.

Prophet arrived in Paris in August of either 1921 or 1922 and obtained a studio on Avenue du Chatillon in Montparnasse. In the fall of 1922 or 1923 to the spring of 1924 or 1925, she studied with Victor Joseph Jean Ambroise Segoffin at the École des Beaux-Arts, a sculptor noted for his statues, tombs, and portrait busts. Under his mentorship, she created two different busts, one of which was exhibited at the Salon d'Automne in 1924. It is thought that because the Salon was at that time more rigid in acceptances, Prophet most likely avoided radical themes in her work, and avoided avant-garde work in order for her sculpting to be shown. She later left the École because she believed she could teach herself faster than working under a supervisor, and she bought her own sculpting tools, doing all the carving with no assistance due to her lack of funds. Prophet also studied woodcutting under Oscar Waldmann, a Swiss German sculptor, and marble cutting from Kousouski, a Polish sculptor.

In the fall of 1925, she took on a six-month sublet in a studio on the famous "Vercingetorix," where other famous painters, such as Maurice Sterne and Patrick Henry Bruce in 1904, and Per and Lucy Krohg (who worked in Gauguin's former studio in the 1910s) lived and worked. Her move into this studio was precipitated by her willingness to leave her husband, who she believed lacked ambition. In this studio, she began La Volonté, her first lifesize statue. In November 1925, she described feeling soothed from her anxiety and depression while sculpting the head of a man she met in a café. This may have been her work Discontent.

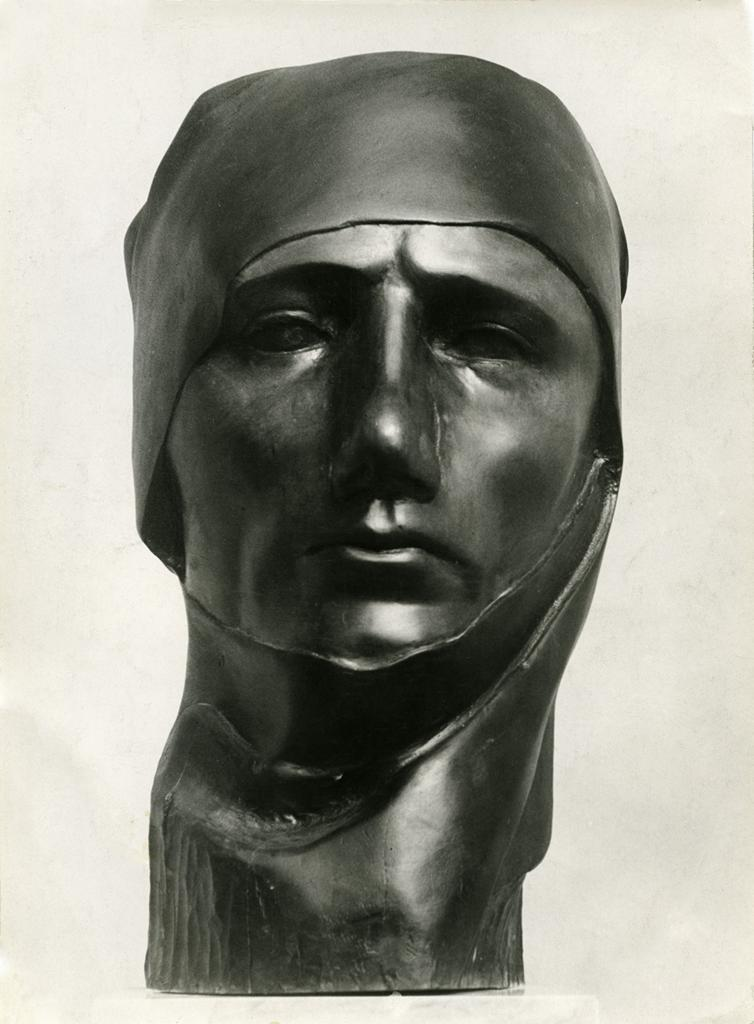
Discontent, Nancy Elizabeth Prophet(American sculptor, 1890-1960); Date: c.1929

Her polychromed wood head Discontent reflected what she described as "a long emotional experience, of restlessness, of gnawing hunger for the way to attainment" during this time in her life. In November 1925, she also began her second life size figure, Le Pélerin. In English, this means The Pilgrim. It is evocative of medieval church statuary and provides nostalgia for the Middle Ages in French art.

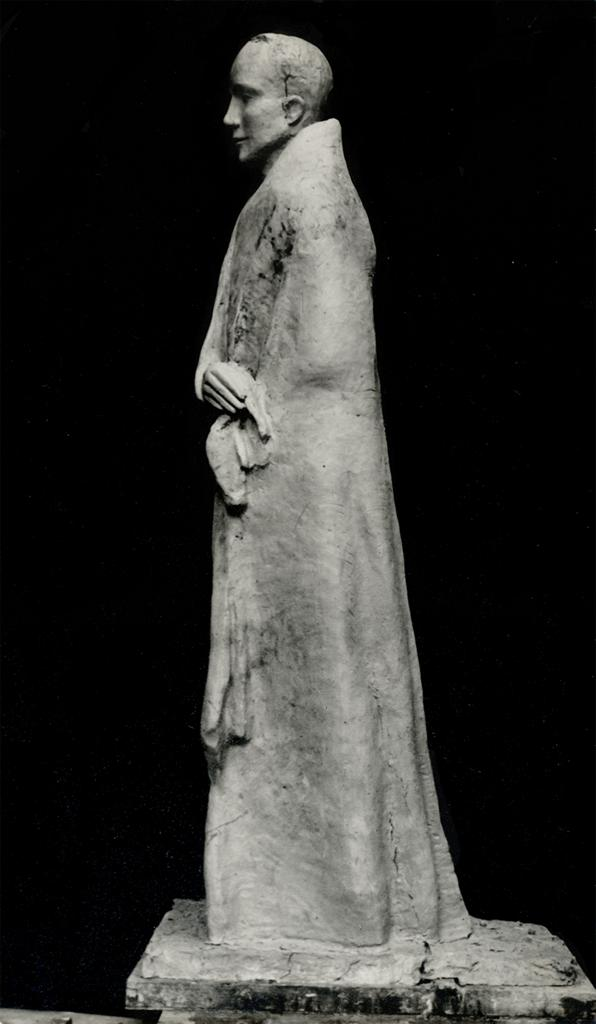
Le Pélerin, Nancy Elizabeth Prophet, (American sculptor, 1890-1960); Bernes, Marouteau& C. (Photographer); Date: c.1922-1929

Her marble bust Silence, a companion piece to Discontent, expresses “months of solitary living in her little Paris apartment, hearing the voice of no one for days on end.” In June 1926, Prophet moved into a new apartment on Rue Broca where she lived for the next eight years. In this new studio, she created her sculpture Prayer (or Poverty), a nude woman in contrapposto, with her right hand on her breast, her head thrown back, and a snake slithering between her ankles resting on her legs.

Along with Silence and Discontent, Prophet created a series of other busts; among these are Poise and Head of a Cossack. The visage of Poise is similar to that of Discontent, while Head of a Cossack bears a resemblance to the visage of Poise but is warmer, made of wood, and identifiable with a long hat.

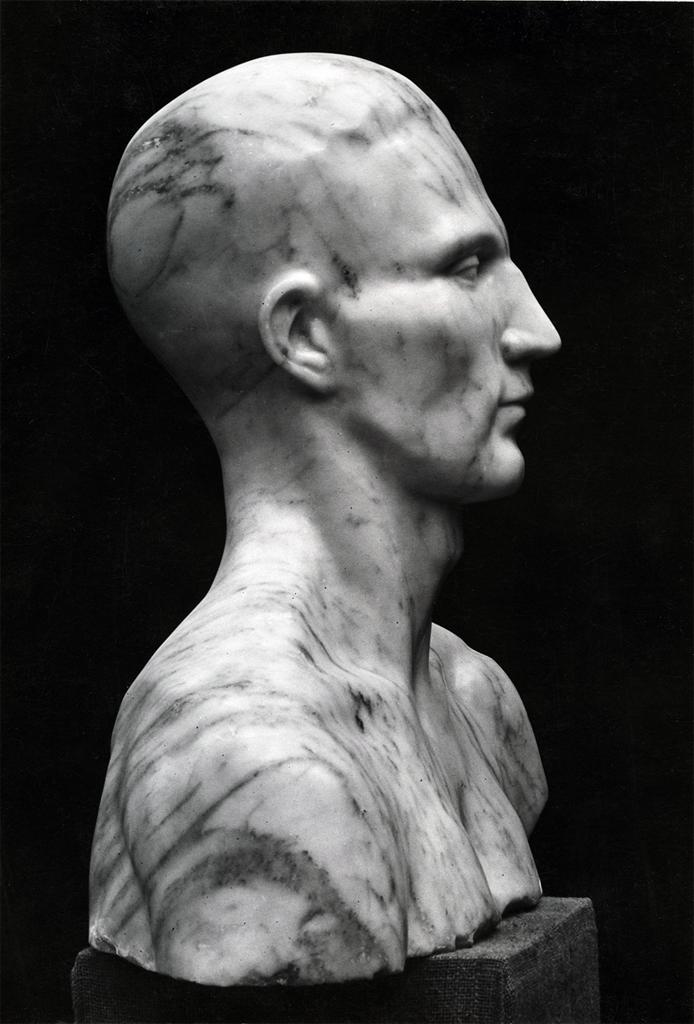
Silence, Nancy Elizabeth Prophet, (American sculptor, 1890-1960); Bernes, Marouteau& C. (Photographer); Date: c.1928-1930

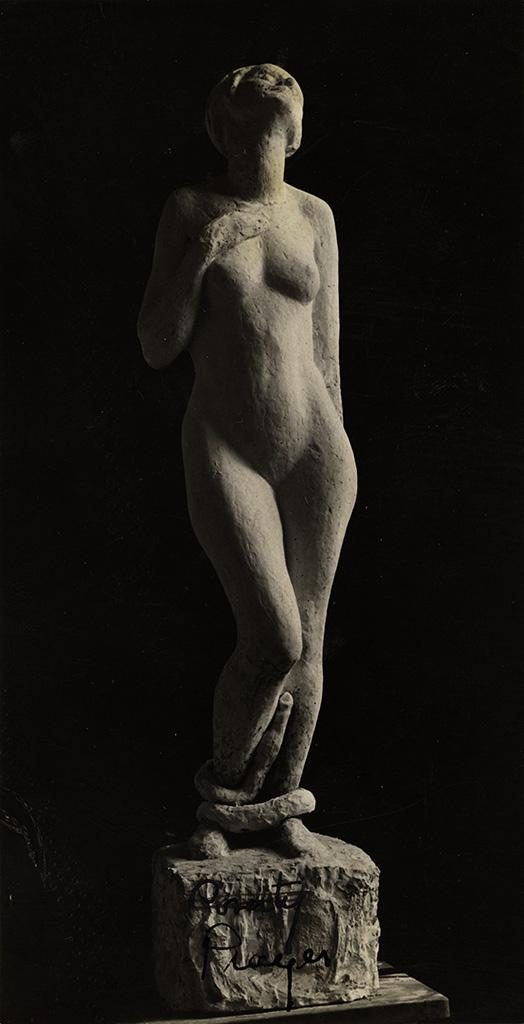
Prayer (Poverty), Nancy Elizabeth Prophet, (American sculptor, 1890-1960); Bernes, Marouteau& C. (Photographer); Date: 1926

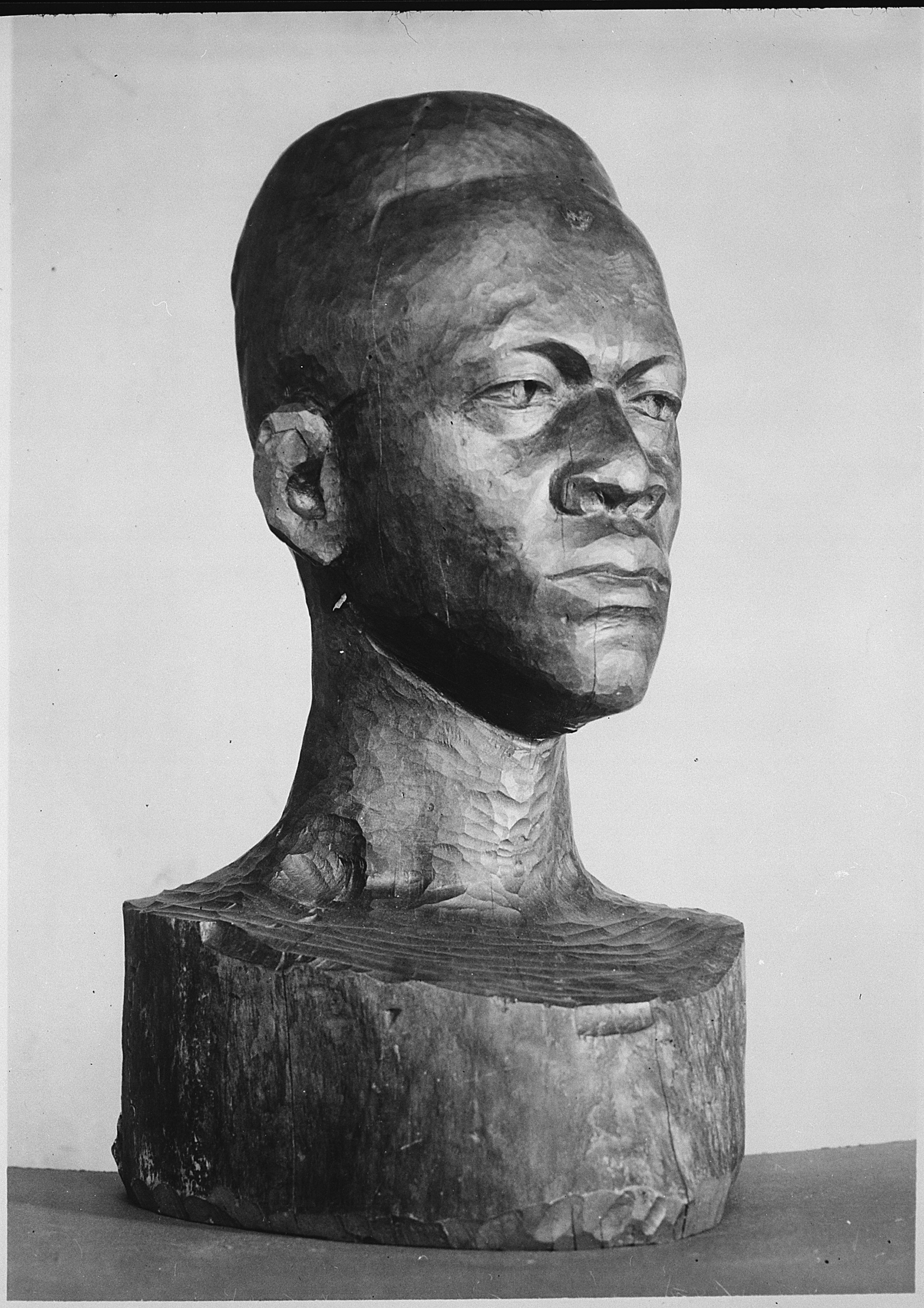
Head of a Negro, Nancy Elizabeth Prophet, ca. 1926-1927, wood

One of Prophet's finest surviving works dates to this period: Negro Head, a larger than life size wooden sculpture, which a niece of Frank Ford identified as her Uncle Frank. Prophet exhibited at the Salon d'Automne and the Societe des Artistes Francais in Paris. W.E.B. Du Bois and Countee Cullen helped submit her work to exhibitions in the United States as well. Prophet won the Harmon Prize for Best Sculpture in 1929. Her wooden sculpture Congolaise imitates noble conflict and "speaks to the ancestral legacy articulated by Locke and Du Bois" during this time.

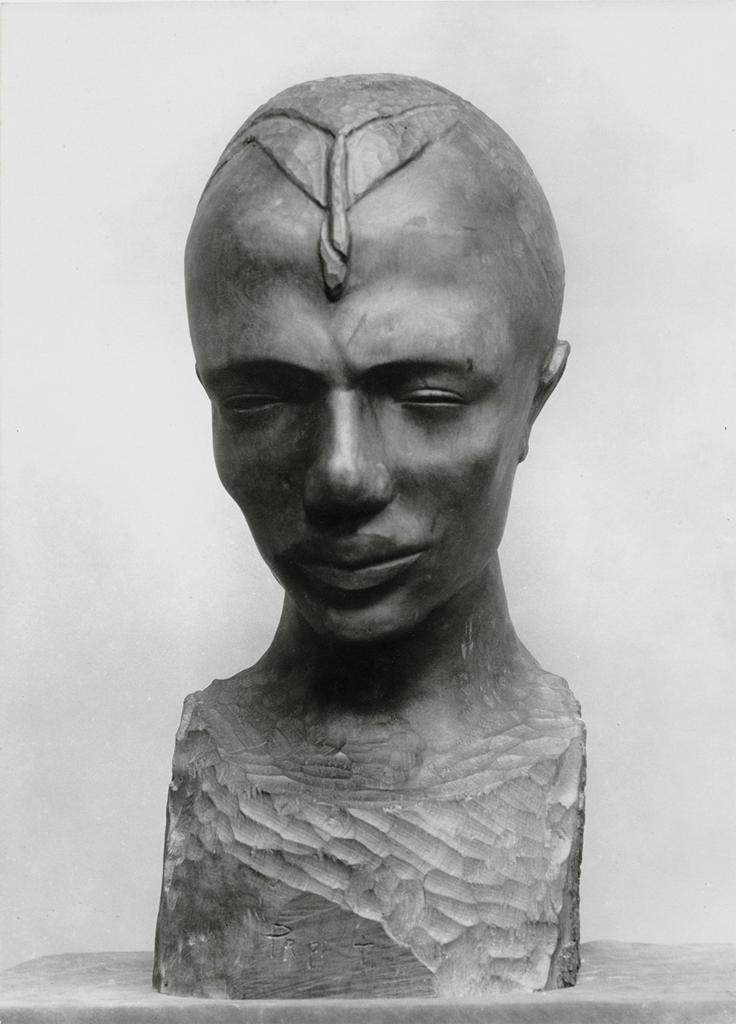
Congolaise, Nancy Elizabeth Prophet (American sculptor, 1890-1960); Date: 1931

Returning to the United States in 1932, Prophet saw her work continue to gain attention. She was invited to exhibit her art in galleries located in New York and Rhode Island. She won the Best in Show prize from the Newport Art Association in 1932. In 1935 and 1937, she participated in the Whitney Museum Sculpture Biennials, and the Sculpture International exhibition at the Philadelphia Museum of Art in 1940. Congolaise became one of the first works by an African American acquired by the Whitney.

=== Work in Atlanta ===
Prophet moved her studies down to Atlanta, Georgia, and began a career as a professor teaching art students enrolled at both Atlanta University and Spelman College in 1934, in hopes of encouraging the creative minds of youth, the encouragement she was not presented with during her early years. At Spelman, she developed the curriculum in fine arts and art history and welcomed students to her own home.

In 1945, Prophet returned to Rhode Island to escape the racial segregation and rejection she had faced in the South. Prophet became a Roman Catholic in 1951. She attempted to regain her status as an artist but had to turn to other employment, including in a ceramics factory and as a domestic work. Her exhibit at the Providence Public Library proved to be the last during her lifetime.

=== Later years and death ===
Near the end of her life, Prophet faced an internal conflict about her identity involving her dual ancestry. She proclaimed her Native American heritage alone, refusing to acknowledge her African-American ancestry. Nancy Elizabeth Prophet died in 1960.

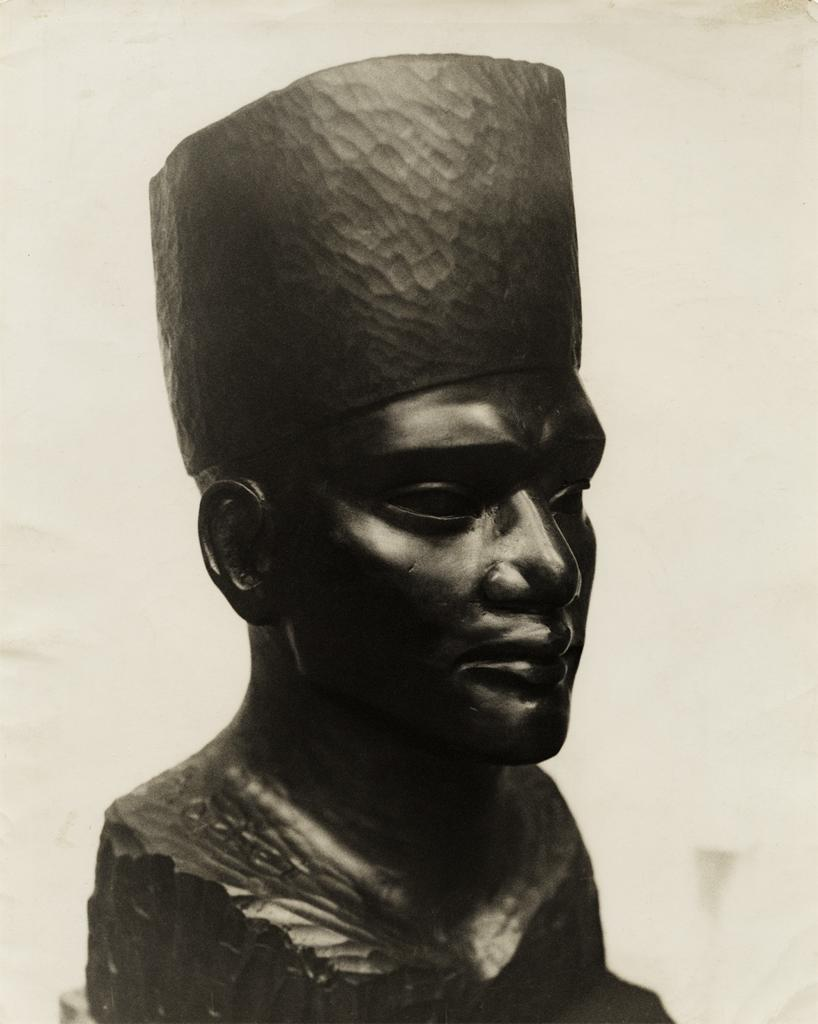
Head of a Cossack, Nancy Elizabeth Prophet, (American sculptor, 1890-1960); Date: 1940

== Exhibitions ==
- 1924: Salon d'Automne; exhibits a wooden bust
- 1928: Exhibition of Work by Former Students and Teachers in Commemoration of the Fiftieth Anniversary of Rhode Island School of Design; features Silence and Head of a Negro
- 1929:
  - Boston Society of Independent Artists; exhibits Head of a Cossack
  - Société des Artistes Français; exhibits Buste d'homme
- 1931–32: Salon d'Automne
- 1930s: Harmon Foundation and Whitney Biennial
- 1945: Providence Public Library
- 1978: “Four from Providence”, Bannister Gallery of Rhode Island College
- 2024: "Nancy Elizabeth Prophet: I Will Not Bend an Inch", Rhode Island School of Design
- 2025: Nancy Elizabeth Prophet: I Will Not Bend an Inch, Brooklyn Museum

== Depictions ==
In conjunction with a series of events in Providence, RI on Prophet's life and work in April 2014, actress Sylvia Ann Soares performed dramatic readings from Prophet's Paris Dairies, 1922-1934, in a performance titled The Life and Art of Nancy Elizabeth Prophet: Calm Assurance and Savage Pleasure. The diaries which served as the source material for the performance, cover Prophet's twelve years in France, and are currently held by Brown University’s John Hay Library.

Later that year, Soares reprised the role of Prophet in "It is Just Defiance": A Living History of Nancy Elizabeth Prophet's Paris Diaries, which covered Prophet's time in Paris during the mid 1930s.

== Bibliography ==
=== Books ===
- Amaki, Amalia K. and Andrea Barnwell Brownlee. Hale Woodruff, Nancy Elizabeth Prophet, and the Academy. Seattle, WA: Spelman College Museum of Fine Art with University of Washington Press, 2007.
- Bannister Gallery (Rhode Island College). Four from Providence: Bannister, Prophet, Alston, Jennings: Black Artists in the Rhode Island Social Landscape. Providence: Rhode Island College, 1978.
- Farrington, Lisa. "Creating Their Own Image: The History of African American Women Artists." NY: Oxford University Press, 2005.
- Hirshler, Erica E. A Studio of Her Own: Women Artists in Boston, 1870-1940. Boston: MFA Publications, 2001.
- Leininger-Miller, Theresa. New Negro Artist in Paris: African American Painters and Sculptors in the City of Light, 1922-1934. New Brunswick, NJ: Rutgers University Press, 2001
- Le Normand-Romain, Antoinette. Sculpture: The Adventure of Modern Sculpture in the Nineteenth and Twentieth Centuries.New York: Skira/Rizzoli, 1986.

=== Articles ===
- Alisha Pina, "Sculptor Nancy Elizabeth Prophet, RISD's First Black Graduate...," Providence Journal, 14 April 2014.

=== Online resources ===
- "Nancy Elizabeth Prophet Collection, Special Collections, James P. Adams Library, Rhode Island College". Accessed September 4, 2019
- "Nancy Elizabeth Prophet, An Unknown Sculptor." The St. James Guide to Black Artist. Ed. Thomas Riggs. African American Registry Online. 1997. ISBN 1-55862-220-9. Accessed 2014-05-22.
- Ask Art: The American Artists Bluebook. 2007 Accessed December 19, 2011
- The Rhode Island Black Heritage Society. 2003. Accessed April 16, 2007.
