= Linda Armstrong =

Linda Armstrong may refer to:

- Linda Armstrong (actress), English actress
- Linda Armstrong (artist) (born 1950s), American artist
