= Erika Massaquoi =

American fashion designer, curator, and educator

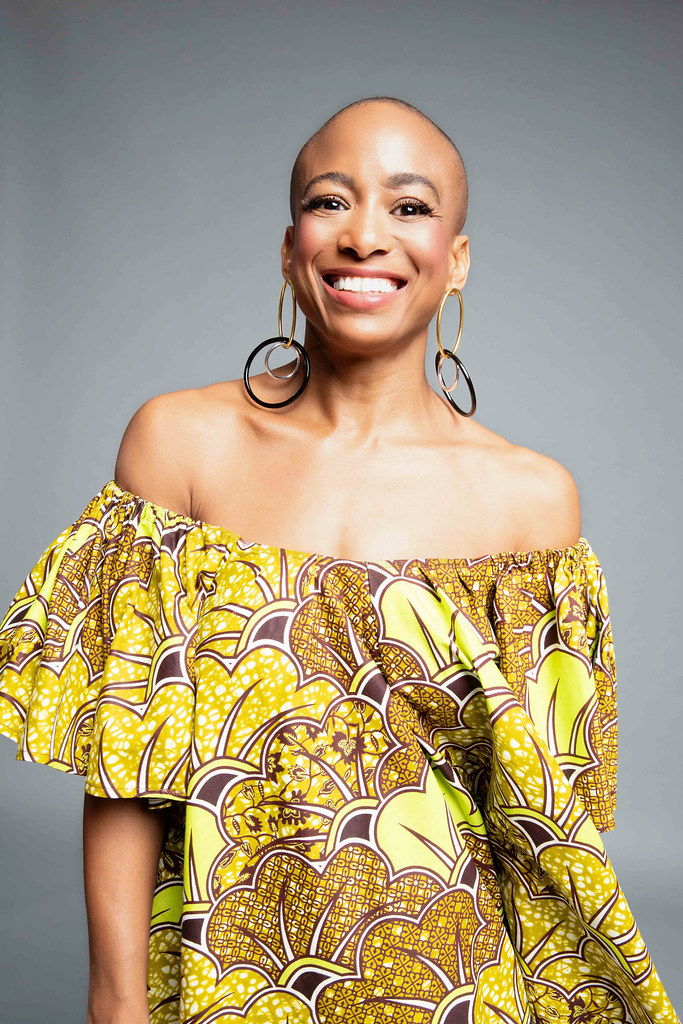
- Erika Massaquoi
- Citizenship: American
- Education: University of Chicago
- Alma mater: New York University
- Occupations: Fashion designer, museum curator, educator
- Employer(s): Fashion Institute of Technology; Seattle Art Museum
- Website: erikadalyamassaquoi.com

Erika Dalya Massaquoi is an American fashion designer, curator, and educator. Massaquoi served as Assistant Dean of the Fashion Institute of Technology in New York and as a consultant curator at the Seattle Art Museum. She has written and lectured on contemporary art, black visual culture, and fashion. She also founded The OULA Company, which manufactures garments in the United States using African textiles.

== Early life and education ==
Massaquoi grew up in Miami, Florida. She holds a BA and MA from the University of Chicago and a Ph.D. in Cinema Studies from New York University. She also has a certificate in Culture, Media & History from New York University. In 1993, during her senior year at the University of Chicago, she was listed in Glamour magazine's Top 10 College Women in America list.

== Career ==
Massaquoi began her career at the Museum of the Moving Image and the Whitney Museum of American Art in New York. She later held teaching appointments at The New School and New York University, and served as Assistant Dean of the School of Art and Design at the Fashion Institute of Technology (FIT). She also worked as a commentator on NPR’s All Things Considered and served as an on-air correspondent for the Oxygen network from 2000 to 2004.

In 2001, Massaquoi co-organized and curated Race in Digital Space at the MIT List Visual Arts Center. The exhibition later traveled to the Studio Museum in Harlem and the Spelman College Museum of Fine Art. Participating artists included Sanford Biggers, Beth Coleman, Prema Murthy, Mendi & Keith Obadike, Paul D. Miller, Paul Pfeiffer, and Keith Piper. The project is archived at the Getty Research Institute.

In 2015, she served as Consultant Curator at the Seattle Art Museum, where she co-curated Disguise: Masks & Global African Art. The exhibition later traveled to the Brooklyn Museum and the Fowler Museum at UCLA, and was reviewed in The New York Times, The Guardian, and The New Yorker. Massaquoi co-authored the exhibition catalogue published by Yale University Press in 2015. The exhibition included various aspects of African traditions such as masquerades. Featured artists included Brendan Fernandes, Nandipha Mntambo, Emeka Ogboh, Wura-Natasha Ogunji, Sondra Perry, Zina Saro-Wiwa, Jacolby Satterwhite, Sam Vernon, William Villalongo, and Saya Woolfalk. She also co-curated Genius / 21 Century / Seattle at the Frye Art Museum in the same year.

In 2015, Massaquoi launched The OULA Company. Nordstrom began carrying the line in 2021. The company designs and produces caftans, tunics, and dresses that feature global textiles. OULA sources textiles in Africa, Asia (primarily India), and Europe. OULA and Prairie Underground collaborated on a denim project, and OULA has also crafted its silhouettes in Liberty London fabric.

The exhibition AFRICA FORECAST: Fashioning Contemporary Life, which Erika Massaquoi co-curated with Andrea Barnwell Brownlee, opened in 2016 and focused on art that documents African women's history and emotions towards clothing and fashion. Featured artists included Amy Sherald, Fabiola Jean-Louis, Ayana V. Jackson, Zohra Opoku, and Deborah Roberts.

In 2018, Massaquoi curated Taking Tea at the Seattle Art Museum, an installation in the Porcelain Room featuring work by ceramic artist Claire Partington.

== Personal life ==
Massaquoi relocated from New York to Seattle in 2012 and again to Denver in 2021. She and her husband, Joe Massaquoi, married in 2009 and have one daughter.
