= Susan Seydel Cofer =

American visual artist

Susan Seydel Cofer is a contemporary American visual artist working in colored pencil on paper.

== Background ==
Susan Cofer was born in Atlanta, Georgia. She earned her Bachelor of Arts from Hollins University (then Hollins College) in 1964 and completed additional courses at Georgia State University in 1970. She lives and works in Atlanta.

== Exhibitions ==
- Susan Cofer: Draw Near, May 29 – September 13, 2014, Eleanor D. Wilson Museum at Hollins University, Roanoke, VA
- Reunion 2007: Susan Cofer '64, June 1 - September 1, 2007, Eleanor D. Wilson Museum at Hollins University, Roanoke, VA

== Collections ==
- The High Museum, Atlanta, GA
- Museum of Contemporary Art of Georgia, Atlanta, GA
