= Eyerman =

Eyerman is a surname. Notable people with the surname include:

- Charlotte Eyerman, American museum director and curator
- J. R. Eyerman (1906–1985), American photographer and photojournalist
