= Linda Armstrong (artist) =

American artist

Linda Armstrong (born 1950s) is an American artist.

== Education ==
Linda Armstrong received her BFA from the Atlanta College of Art and her MFA from Georgia State University. She attended Yale at Norfolk summer program on a fellowship.

== Career ==
Armstrong has had one-person exhibitions at Kunstraum Tapir, Berlin, Germany; the Museum of Contemporary Art of Georgia; the Institute of Ecology at the University of Georgia; the Southeastern Center for Contemporary Art, Winston-Salem, NC; the Atlanta Contemporary Art Center; the Spruill Gallery, Converse College, Martha Berry College, Rome, GA; Ybor Art Gallery, Hillsborough Community College, Tampa, FL and Sandler Hudson Gallery, Atlanta, GA. She has been included in numerous group exhibitions, including, ‘Copy Cat Art’, Franklin Furnace, NYC, Taller Galleria Fort, Barcelona, Spain, ‘Still Water’ at Agnes Scott College.

Her work is included in the Hartsfield Jackson Atlanta International Airport collection.

Armstrong has been the recipient of numerous grants and fellowships including the Southern Arts Federation/National Endowment for the Arts, Fulton County Arts Council, the City of Atlanta Bureau of Cultural Affairs and the Center for Chemical Evolution Grant, Georgia Institute of Technology, Graduate School of Architecture.

Since 1993 Armstrong has taught Sculpture at Emory University’s Art History Department. As a Senior Lecturer she is currently teaching Foundation in Art Practices, a methods and materials class that parallels Art History 101 and 102. In 2015-2016 she has instituted a series of printmaking courses.

Armstrong is also a curator. She curated the ‘In Exile from the Land of Reason" a 2007 exhibition at the Eyedrum Gallery in Atlanta, GA. Catherine Fox wrote in the AJC, that the show demonstrated that " political art, like politics itself, takes many forms."

== Exhibitions ==
Linda Armstrong’s “re-installation” of Beach at the Museum of Contemporary Art of Georgia (MOCA GA) 1992 sends a message about water pollution. Karen Tauches of BurnAWAY recounts a story about how Linda was walking peacefully on a remote beach of Cumberland Island—an unspoiled wilderness on Georgia’s coast- when the carcass of a dolphin washed ashore. Armstrong accompanied Carol Ruckdeschel, the resident naturalist at the Cumberland Island Museum, took the dolphin to the lab to ascertain the cause of death. Lesions were present in the mouth that indicated an immune deficiency; man-made pollution was the likely cause. Linda's artists' book, Barrier Island, also addresses the need for environmental protection of Georgia's Cumberland Island.

In 2008, Lisa Kurtzner reviewed Linda’s installation, "Collecting Excursions," displayed at Emory Visual Arts Gallery, which deals with environmental issues and the Southern landscape. With sculpture and drawing, Linda Armstrong's "Collecting Excursions," investigated Southern natural habitats and, hopefully, encouraged viewers to re-create her wanderings. The artwork led the viewer through a forest of mushroom specimens that had been transformed by the artist. One wall contained delicate drawings created by the fluids and flesh of mushrooms compressed on paper. The stained forms in russets and purplish brown tones provided evidence in dried traces of specimens captured on walks and brought into the studio for study. The mushrooms Armstrong gathered (primarily in the North Georgia forests near the Hambidge Center) were cast in bronze and displayed in two groupings, as free-standing sculptures on pedestals and as a wall installation. A bandaged tree rescued from Grant Park was hung root-side up as a commentary on the environmental destruction of the city of Atlanta. Each exhibition segment suggested a different aspect of nature --- sexual, majestic, helpless --- in this layered look at the environment. This show asked questions about where contemporary lifestyle and environment collide that one hopes will be addressed in the next installment of this work.

"Women’s Path,” a collection of 25 bronze tiles created between 1989 and 1994, including a work by Linda Armstrong, was transferred from the Atlanta Contemporary Art Center to the Museum of Contemporary Art of Georgia’s collection in 2015.

== International artists residencies ==
- 1989, 1991, 1994, 1995, 1997, 2000-2009: Hambidge Fellow, Hambidge Center (Rabun Gap, GA)
- 2000: Virginia Center for the Creative Arts, Fellow (Sweet Briar, VA)
- 2002: Virginia Center for the Creative Arts, Fellow (Sweet Briar, VA)
- 2007: Caversham Centre for Artists and Writers Residency Program (South Africa). Hammonds House and Fulton County Arts Council
- 2009: Takt Kunstprojektraum, Artist Residency (Berlin, Germany)
- 2010: Sanskriti Foundation, Artist Residency (New Delhi, India)
- 2011: Takt Kunstprojektraum, Artist Residency (Berlin, Germany)
- 2013: ComPeung (Chiang Mai, Thailand)
