= Shirley L. Bolton =

American artist

Shirley Lee Bolton
- Born: January 9, 1945; Lexington, Georgia
- Died: August 10, 1984 (aged 39); Pensacola, Florida
- Known for: Artist, Educator

Shirley L. Bolton (1945-1984) was an American painter and educator.

== Biography ==
Bolton was born on January 9, 1945 in Lexington, Georgia. She attended University of Georgia in Athens, earning her BFA in 1966, her MFA in 1970, and eventually earning her PhD. She exhibited her art at the High Museum of Art in Atlanta. Her work is in the Museum of Contemporary Art of Georgia. Her 1971 drawing The World Outside is in Georgia's State Art Collection.

Bolton died August 10, 1984 in Pensacola, Florida. Some of her papers are in the Art & Artist files at the Smithsonian American Art Museum.
