= Amy Meyers =

American art historian

- Born: Amy R. Weinstein
- Other name: Amy R.W. Meyers
- Occupations: Curator; Art historian
- Spouse: Charles "Jack" Meyers III
- Children: Rachel Meyers

Academic background
- Education: University of Chicago; Yale University
- Thesis: Sketches from the Wilderness: Changing Conceptions of Nature in American Natural History Illustration, 1680-1880 (1985)
- Doctoral advisor: Howard R. Lamar; Jules Prown; Bryan Wolf

Academic work
- Discipline: American art British art
- Institutions: Huntington Library; Yale University

Amy R. Weinstein Meyers is an American art historian. Meyers is the former Director of the Yale Center for British Art in New Haven and Chief Executive Officer of the Paul Mellon Centre for Studies in British Art in London.

== Career ==
Meyers received a Bachelor of Arts from the University of Chicago in 1977 and a Doctor of Philosophy from Yale University in American Studies in 1985. At Yale, her dissertation was titled "Sketches from the Wilderness: Changing Conceptions of Nature in American Natural History Illustration, 1680-1880," and was advised by Professors Howard R. Lamar, Jules Prown, and Bryan Wolf.

Meyers worked as Curator of American Art of the Huntington Library, beginning in 1988. In September 2002, Meyers began her appointment as Director of the Yale Center for British Art. In June 2019, Meyers retired from Yale and was succeeded by Courtney J. Martin.

== Personal life ==
Meyers married Charles "Jack" Meyers III, a fellow Yale graduate (Class of 1972), with whom she has one daughter, Rachel.

== See also ==
- List of female art museum directors
- List of University of Chicago alumni
- List of Yale University people
