= Anne Poulet =

American art historian

- Born: Anne Litle Poulet; March 20, 1942 (age 84); United States
- Education: Sweet Briar College, New York University Institute of Fine Arts
- Occupations: Museum curator, museum director at The Frick Collection
- Known for: First woman museum director at The Frick Collection
- Spouse: François Poulet

Anne Litle Poulet (born March 20, 1942) is a retired American art historian. Poulet is an expert in the area of French art, particularly sculpture. In her career, she organized two major monographic exhibitions on the French sculptors Clodion and Jean-Antoine Houdon, respectively.

== Early life ==
On March 20, 1942, Poulet was born in Washington, D.C.

== Education ==
In 1964, Poulet earned a B.A. degree from Sweet Briar College, a private all women's college in Sweet Briar, Virginia. Poulet graduated cum laude. In 1970, Poulet completed graduate studies at the New York University Institute of Fine Arts. In 1993, Poulet earned a certificate of graduation from Museum Management Institute in Berkeley, California.

== Career ==
Poulet served for twenty years as a Curator Emerita in the department of decorative arts and sculpture at the Museum of Fine Arts, Boston in Boston, Massachusetts. While Poulet was the curator, she was responsible for adding many acquisitions to the museum, including the Firestone Collection of French silver, Frits and Rita Markus Collection of ceramics and enamel, William A. Coolidge Collection of painting, sculpture and decorative arts and Edward Pflueger Collection of ceramics.

In 2003, Poulet curated Jean-Antoine Houdon (1741-1828), an exhibition organized and exhibited by the National Gallery of Art, Washington (exhibited May 4 - September 7, 2003), the J. Paul Getty Museum, Los Angeles (November 4, 2003 - January 25, 2004), and the Réunion des musées nationaux and l'Etablissement public du musée et du domaine national de Versailles, France (March 1 - May 30, 2004).

In October 2003, Poulet was appointed as the director of The Frick Collection, a museum in New York. Poulet became the first female director in the museum's history. In 2011, Poulet created and published The Frick Collection, a general guide to the museum's collection. In 2011, Poulet retired as the museum director, and was succeeded by Ian Wardropper.

In September 2011, Poulet joined the Institute of Fine Arts' Board of Trustees at New York University.

In 2019, Poulet was a judge in the French Heritage Society Book Award.

== Lectures ==
List of Poulet's art lectures.

- November 6, 2003, The First Statuary in the World: Jean-Antoine Houdon. The Getty Center.
- November 2011 A Gallery of Worthies: Thomas Jefferson and Jean Antoine Houdon. University of Georgia - Lamar Dodd School of Art.
- November 2012 On the Run: Clodion's Bacchanalian Figures. Dallas Museum of At.

== Awards and recognitions ==
- Ford Foundation grant in museum training
- Kress Fellow
- 2000 Iris Foundation Award winner
- 2007 Chevalier dans l'Ordre des Arts et des Lettres, France
- 2008 Awards in Italian Culture 2008 - American Award

== Works ==
- Corot to Braque: French Paintings from the Museum of Fine Arts, Boston, 1979, ISBN 9780878461349.
- Clodion, 1738-1814, 1992, ISBN 9782711823529.
- Jean-Antoine Houdon: Sculptor of the Enlightenment, 2003, ISBN 9780894683015.

== See also ==
- List of female art museum directors

Cultural offices
Preceded by Samuel Sachs II	Director The Frick Collection; 2003 – 2011	Succeeded by Ian Wardropper
