= Jules Prown =

American art historian (born 1930)

- Born: Jules David Prown; March 14, 1930 (age 96); Freehold, New Jersey, US
- Occupation: Art historian

Academic background
- Education: Lafayette College; Harvard University; University of Delaware
- Thesis: The English Career of John Singleton Copley, R.A (1961)

Academic work
- Discipline: American art
- Institutions: Yale University
- Doctoral students: Amy Meyers; Alexander Nemerov

Jules David Prown (born March 14, 1930, in Freehold) is an American art historian. Prown is the Paul Mellon Professor Emeritus of the History of Art at Yale University, where he has focused on American art and the art of John Singleton Copley since 1961.

== Career ==
Born to Max Prown and Matilda Cassileth in Freehold, Prown attended the Peddie School. He received his Bachelor of Arts from Lafayette College (1951). He then continued on to receive two Master of Arts degrees from Harvard University (1953) and the University of Delaware in Early American Culture (1956), respectively. Prown completed his Doctor of Philosophy in Art History from Harvard (1961). There, his dissertation was titled "The English Career of John Singleton Copley, R.A," in which he studied the painter John Singleton Copley.

Upon graduating from Harvard, Prown began teaching at Yale University, where he has remained throughout his career. He is now the Paul Mellon Professor Emeritus of the History of Art. He has also held the posts of Curator of American Art at the Yale University Art Gallery and is the Founding Director of the Yale Center for British Art.

In 1964, Prown was awarded a Guggenheim Fellowship in Fine Arts.

== See also ==
- List of Guggenheim Fellowships awarded in 1964
- List of Lafayette College people
- List of Harvard University people
- List of University of Delaware people
