= Claudia Gould =

American art curator and museum director

- Born: Connecticut
- Education: New York University
- Occupation: Art curator
- Employer: Shaker Museum and Library

Claudia Gould is an art curator and executive director of the Shaker Museum and Library. Previously, she was the Helen Goldsmith Menschel Director of The Jewish Museum in New York City, among other prior positions.

== Life and work ==
Claudia Gould was born and raised near New Haven, Connecticut. She had a Jewish father and a Roman Catholic mother. She has a bachelor of arts degree in art history from Boston College and a master's degree from New York University.

As part of her education she was an intern at the Institute of Contemporary Art, Boston, San Francisco Museum of Modern Art, The New Museum and Artists Space, NYC. From 1999 to 2011, Gould served as Executive Director of Artists Space in New York City.

Gould has worked as both a staff member and independent curator for various art institutions and museums. Her first curatorial position was at Hallwalls Contemporary Arts Center in Buffalo, New York in 1983. That same year, Gould co-founded Tellus Audio Cassette Magazine, devoted to global, cutting-edge music and sound art, with artist Joseph Nechvatal and Carol Parkinson, director of Harvestworks.

Gould was a curator and program coordinator for PS 1 (now MoMA PS1), in charge of their National and International Studio Program from 1984 to 1986. She was the American Curatorial Coordinator for Documenta 8 in 1987 and then served as curator of exhibitions at the Wexner Center for the Arts at Ohio State University from 1988 through 1992. During her tenure at Wexner, exhibitions ranged from a one-person exhibition on Kiki Smith to In Black and White: Dress from the 1920s to Today, in an installation designed by French interior designer Andrée Putman.

Some of Gould's independent curatorial projects include: the (1992) site-specific installation Kawamata Project on Roosevelt Island; a collaborative building project with artist Vito Acconci and architect Steven Holl at New York City's Storefront for Art and Architecture (1993) and The Music Box Project, a commission of 17 music boxes by contemporary artists in collaboration with the 100-year-old Swiss music box company Reuge (1994).

From 1994 to 1999, Gould served as executive director of Artists Space, the landmark New York City alternative exhibition space and artist service organization dedicated to emerging artists working in all mediums. She reinstated Artists Space's architecture and design program, which began in 1979 with Bernard Tschumi, by giving architects Greg Lynn, UN Studio/Ben van Berkel and Caroline Bos, Galia Solomonoff, Toshiko Mori and designer J. Abbott Miller their first one-person exhibitions. Other highlights of her time at Artists Space include an exhibition and publication on the History of Squat Theatre and a comprehensive 25th anniversary book in tandem with an exhibition with Laurie Anderson.

In 1999 Gould was appointed Director of Philadelphia's Institute of Contemporary Art, Philadelphia, University of Pennsylvania where she served until 2011. During Claudia's tenure as Director, the ICA initiated multiple programs to integrate themselves within the academic and civic community of the University, such as Writing Through Art and Culture with the Center for Programs in Contemporary Writing and Kelly Writers House.

As the ICA's Director, Gould organized the first museum surveys of artists Lisa Yuskavage, Charles LeDray and Polly Apfelbaum, an exhibition by graphic designer Stefan Sagmeister and brought a major retrospective to the institution on the work of fashion designer Rudi Gernreich, in an installation by architects Coop Himmelb(l)au. Exhibitions presented by the team at the ICA under Gould's leadership demonstrated a continuous integration of design, fashion and popular culture in a contemporary art setting. Highlights include a 36-institution, citywide initiative called “The Big Nothing”; a retrospective of the work of Barry Le Va; a survey of the work of Karen Kilimnik, Ensemble, a commissioned exhibition curated by Christian Marclay; Rodney Graham: A Little Thought; Intricacy, curated by architect and theorist Greg Lynn; Dirt on Delight: Impulses that Form Clay, significant work in clay by 22 artists spanning four generations; Pathways to Unknown Worlds: Sun Ra, El Saturn and Chicago's Afro-Futurist Underground, 1954-1968, an exhibition on Jazz pioneer, bandleader, mystic, philosopher, and Afro-Futurist, Sun Ra and his ensemble; the first U.S. solo museum exhibition for Mexican artist Damián Ortega; the first U.S. solo museum exhibition for Trisha Donnelly; and a survey focusing on Maira Kalman’s work as illustrator an co-founder of M&Co.

The New York Times wrote of the ICA during Claudia Gould’s tenure, “On a surprisingly regular basis, the Institute of Contemporary Art mounts exhibitions that make the contemporary art adventures of many larger museums look blinkered, timid and hidebound.” At ICA, she tripled the museum's exhibition schedule, the staff, and the budget, from $1 million to $3.1 million.

Gould joined the staff of The Jewish Museum in November 2011 and became until mid-2023 the Helen Goldsmith Menschel Director in early 2012, succeeding Joan Rosenbaum.

== Publications ==
- 1992: Kiki Smith, Wexner Center for the Arts, ISBN 9781881390015
- 1996: Tadashi Kawamata: Project on Roosevelt Island, Princeton Architectural Press, ISBN 9780963637208
- 1998: 5000 Artists Return To Artists Space: 25 Years, Artists Space, ISBN 9780966362602
- 2002: 1998-2001: A Project by Richard Tuttle, University of Pennsylvania, Institute of Contemporary Art, ISBN 9780884540984
- 2003: Polly Apfelbaum, Institute of Contemporary Art, Philadelphia, ISBN 9780884541035
- 2008: Trisha Donnelly, Institute of Contemporary Art, Philadelphia, ISBN 9780884541141
- 2008: The Puppet Show, Institute of Contemporary Art, Philadelphia, ISBN 9780884541134
- 2009: Jesus in America: And Other Stories from the Field, Utah State University Press, ISBN 9780874217605
- 2009: Dirt on Delight: Impulses That Form Clay, Institute of Contemporary Art, Philadelphia, ISBN 9780884541172
- 2010: Maira Kalman: Various Illuminations (of a Crazy World), Prestel Publishing, ISBN 9783791350356
- 2011: Anne Tyng: Inhabiting Geometry, University of Pennsylvania, ISBN 9780884541219
- 2013: Stefan Sagmeister: The Happy Film: A Pitchbook, Institute of Contemporary Art, Philadelphia, ISBN 9780884541257
