= Charlotte Eyerman =

American museum director and curator

Charlotte Nalle Eyerman is an American museum director and curator and expert in 19th century French art. She was appointed Director and Chief Curator of the JPMorgan Chase art collection in 2017. She is a member of the board of trustees at Accountability Lab. Eyerman has also served as Director and chief executive officer of the Monterey Museum of Art (2010–2013), and as Director of the Gagosian Gallery, Beverly Hills.

In 2014 Eyerman was named a Chevalier (Knight) in France's Ordre des Arts et des Lettres, in honor of her "outstanding achievements in the field of cultural diplomacy."

== Biography ==
Charlotte Eyerman is the daughter of artist and psychotherapist, Sun Smith-Foret, and Edward L. Eyerman, Jr., a neurologist and art collector. She was born and raised in St. Louis, Missouri. She received her master's degree in 1990 and her PhD in the History of Art in 1997 from the University of California, Berkeley. At Union College in Schenectady, New York, Eyerman was Assistant Professor of Art History (1994-2001).

Eyerman served as the Director of the French American Museum Exchange (FRAME) North America (2010–2013), Curator of Modern and Contemporary Art at the St. Louis Art Museum, St. Louis, Missouri (2006–2009). As Curator, she oversaw the installation of the 2009 exhibition, Action/Abstraction: Pollock, de Kooning, and American Art, 1940-1976, which won an award from the Association of Art Museum Curators for best installation or exhibition. Before that, Eyerman served as Assistant Curator of Paintings, at the J. Paul Getty Museum, Los Angeles, California (2002–2006). In 2013, she became the executive director of the Monterey Museum of Art.

As independent curator, Eyerman's exhibitions include Just Add Water at the Natural History Museum Los Angeles County (2013–2015), Cubisti Cubismo at the Complesso Monumentale del Vittoriano in Rome, Italy (2011–13), Pacific Standard Time at the Natural History Museum Los Angeles County, and Artistic Evolution at the Natural History Museum Los Angeles County (2010–2012). In 2012, Eyerman gave a TEDx talk on Artist as Muse, in Santa Monica, California.

== Work ==
Along with Mary Morton, the associate curator of paintings at the J. Paul Getty Museum, Eyerman coauthored the work published by the museum that accompanied the 2006 exhibition of a collection of curated works of Gustave Courbet's landscapes Courbet and the Modern Landscape (2006). The publication groups the art by topography and also "succeeds in presenting Courbet in a new light," according to Library Journal. The Art Book wrote "It is a handsome publication, a welcome addition to any library, public or private."

The book, Old Masters, Impressionists, and Moderns (2002) collects the "big names" of French artists from the collection of the State Pushkin Museum in Moscow.

== Publications ==
- The Composition of Femininity: The Significance of the 'Woman at the Piano' Motif in 19th-Century French Culture from Daumier to Renoir (Ph.D. Dissertation) Berkeley: University of California at Berkeley, 1997
- Courbet and the Modern Landscape (with Mary Morton), ISBN 978-0-89236-836-5 hardcover, 2006.
- Old Masters, Impressionists, and Moderns: French Masterworks from the State Pushkin Museum, Moscow (with Irina Antonova, Eugenya Georgievskaya, and Elena Sharnova), ISBN 9780300097368 cloth, 2002.
- Cubisti cubismo / a cura di Charlotte Eyerman. Milano : Skira, 2013. ISBN 8857219038. 9788857219035
- Action/Abstraction: Pollock, de Kooning, and American Art, 1940-1976, (essay) New Haven: Yale University Press, 2009, ISBN 9780300139204.

== Honors ==
In 2014 Eyerman was named a Chevalier (Knight) in France's Ordre des Arts et des Lettres.
