= Amalia Amaki =

American art historian

- Born: Lynda Faye Peek; July 8, 1949 (age 76); Atlanta, Georgia
- Known for: Mixed media
- Awards: Distinguished Alumni Award from Emory University College of Arts and Sciences

Amalia K. Amaki (born Lynda Faye Peek, July 8, 1949) is an African-American artist, art historian, educator, film critic and curator who recently resided in Tuscaloosa, Alabama, where she was Professor of Modern and Contemporary Art at the University of Alabama at Tuscaloosa from 2007 to 2012.

== Background ==
Lynda Faye Peek was born in Atlanta, Georgia, the fourth of six daughters. Her father, Norman Vance Peek, was a singer with the Deep South Boys of Macon, Georgia. She was a creative child and knew from a young age that she wanted to be an artist. She met African American painter Hale Woodruff, whom she cited as an influence on her work, when she was about 10 years old and made her first sale at the age of 13. She created still lifes from yarn and burlap bags that were included in a furniture display at Rich's Department Store in Atlanta. When a customer purchased the furniture, he assumed that her work was included in the sale.

Peek graduated from Georgia State University in Atlanta in 1971 with a B.A. degree in journalism and psychology. She changed her name to Amalia K. Amaki in 1978 just prior to moving to New Mexico where she obtained a B.A. degree from the University of New Mexico in Albuquerque, New Mexico, in photography and art history. Amaki earned her M.A. degree (1992) in modern European and American art and a Ph.D. (1994) in twentieth-century American art and culture from Emory University in Atlanta. Amaki has taught art history at Spelman College, Morehouse College and Atlanta College of Art in Atlanta, Georgia; Kennesaw State University in Kennesaw, Georgia; and North Georgia College and State University in Dahlonega, Georgia. In 2001, she became Curator of the Paul R. Jones Collection of African American Art at the University of Delaware in Newark, Delaware where she was on the faculty in the Art History and Black Studies Departments until 2007.^{[3]} After leaving that position, she taught art, art history, and visual studies at the University of Alabama in Tuscaloosa, Alabama until 2012.

== Artwork ==
Amaki's art work explores African-American life and culture through the use of photography frequently inlaid in boxes, quilts, and fans. She embellishes these pieces with found objects, like buttons, beads, flowers, and bits of fabric. Amaki first started working with buttons as a child, when her mother gave her buttons to play with because marbles were too boyish. Her work also includes photo (cyanotype) quilts and large scale digital photographs on fabric where portraiture is used as conduits to discussions of commercial profiling, cultural branding, and methods of advancing cultural assumptions.

=== Collections ===
Amaki's works of art can be found in numerous private art collections throughout the world, and are included in the permanent collection of the Museum of Fine Arts, Houston in Houston, Texas; the High Museum of Art in Atlanta, Georgia; the Minnesota Museum of American Art in St. Paul, Minnesota; the University of Delaware in Newark, Delaware; the Gibbes Museum of Art in Charleston, South Carolina; the Albany Museum of Art in Albany, Georgia, the Hammonds House Museum in Atlanta, Georgia; the Museum of Contemporary Art of Georgia (MOCA-GA) in Atlanta, Georgia and the Tubman African American Museum in Macon, Georgia, among others.

=== Exhibitions ===
- "Amalia Amaki: Boxes, Buttons and the Blues," an exhibition including 80 mixed-media works, resulted from a collaboration between the National Museum of Women in the Arts and the Spelman College Museum of Fine Art. It opened In Washington, D.C. at the National Museum of Women in the Arts where it was on display June 10-September 25, 2005 and then moved to Atlanta where it was at Spelman from January 26-May 13, 2006.
- “Homage: Poems and Images of Gratitude and Affection,” was hosted at the Arnold Art Gallery at Shorter University in 2011 and later at The Art Gallery at Eissey Campus, Palm Beach State College, 2014.

== Bibliography ==
- Amaki, Amalia K. A Century of African American Art: The Paul R. Jones Collection. Newark, Del: University Museum, University of Delaware, 2004.
- National Museum of Women in the Arts (U.S.), Judy L. Larson, Andrea Barnwell Brownlee, Gloria Jean Wade Gayles, Leslie King-Hammond, and Amalia K. Amaki. Amalia Amaki: Boxes, Buttons and the Blues. Washington, D.C.: National Museum of Women in the Arts, 2005.
- Amaki, Amalia K. and Andrea Barnwell Brownlee. Hale Woodruff, Nancy Elizabeth Prophet, and the Academy. Seattle, WA: Spelman College Museum of Fine Art with University of Washington Press, 2007.
- Amaki, Amalia K. "Richard A. Long," introduction to Swann Galleries. The Richard A. Long Collection of African-American Art. 2014.
- Amaki, Amalia K., and Priscilla N. Davis. Tuscaloosa. Charleston, South Carolina: Arcadia Publishing, 2015.
