= Annette Cone-Skelton =

American artist

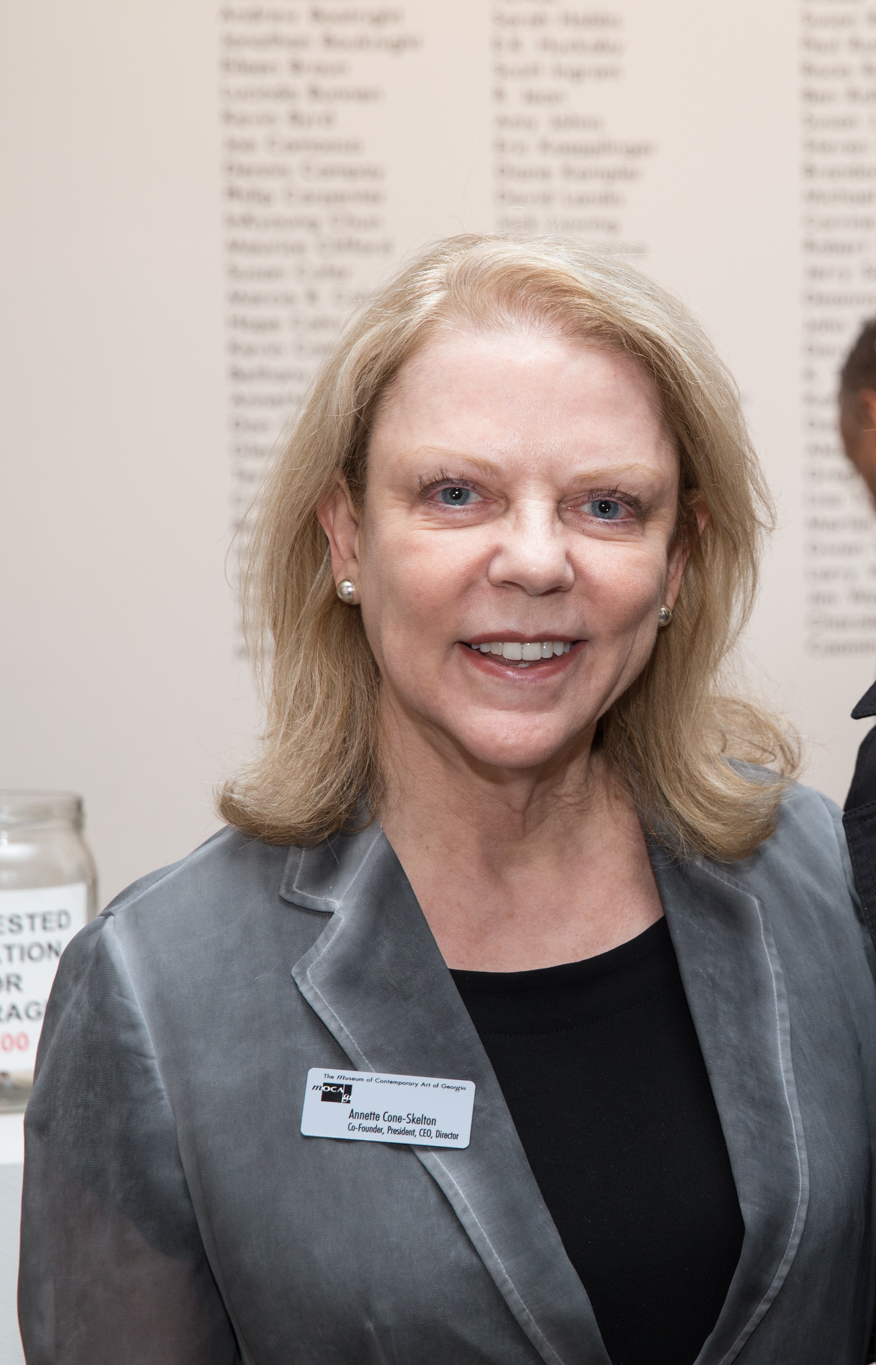
- Born: 1942 (age 83–84)
- Education: Atlanta College of Art
- Known for: Minimal approach to the elements of color and shape
- Style: Visual Art
- Movement: Minimalist
- Awards: Creative Loafing’s “Critic’s Choice for Best Visual Artist in Atlanta", 1998; Governor’s Awards for the Arts & Humanities, 2012; Museum Educator of the Year, Georgia Arts Education Association, 2012
- Elected: president, CEO, and director of the Museum of Contemporary Art of Georgia

Annette Cone-Skelton (born 1942) is a Georgia-based American artist, teacher, gallerist and art consultant. Currently, she is director and president of the Museum of Contemporary Art of Georgia. She studied at the Atlanta School of Art, now known as the Atlanta College of Art. Cone-Skelton's work is represented in the collections of various regional museums and galleries, public and private collections. The High Museum, the museums of Louis, Charlotte, Chattanooga, Birmingham and Montgomery and several academic institutions including Cornell University hold her work. She has been included in exhibitions at Le Grand Prix de Peinture and the National Museum of Women in the Arts.

Annette Cone-Skelton employs a minimal approach to the elements of color and shape to explore relationships of space to human dimension. In 9 Women in Georgia, she states that "When one draws a line one time, it is a line. When one draws line a thousand times, it is transformed."

Cone-Skelton began curating for CGR Advisors (private real estate investment firm) corporate art collection in 1989 in collaboration with Firm President, David S. Golden. Over 12 years they amassed 250 pieces from 110 artists that chronicled Georgia's history from World War II to the late ’90s. In 2000, CGR downsized their offices necessitating a new home for the extensive collection of works. Cone-Skelton's vision for the artwork, "to focus on Georgia artists and place them in the context of a global environment by showing their work alone and in group exhibitions with national and international artists", was realized when she and Golden co-founded the Museum of Contemporary Art of Georgia.
