= Andrea Barnwell Brownlee =

American art curator

- Education: Duke University
- Alma mater: Spelman College
- Writing career
- Subjects: African-American art/artists
- Notable awards: 2013 David C. Driskell Prize

Andrea Barnwell Brownlee is an American art curator and author. She is the former CEO of the Cummer Museum and the former director of the Spelman College Museum of Fine Art. Her work has historically focused on the promotion of female African-American artists. She has published four books on artists.

== Early life and education ==
Brownlee was born in Alexandria, Virginia. Her father is a retired Army officer. She entered Spelman College in 1989, focusing on English and the arts. During her junior year, she studied at the University of Essex. She earned her master's in art history from Duke University in 1997, and Ph.D. in art history in 2001.

== Career ==
Andrea Brownlee was contacted by Spelman College during her time working in the MacArthur Curatorial Fellowship at The Art Institute of Chicago, asking her to consider serving as the director of the college's new Museum of Fine Art. Though she initially declined, she would later accept the directorship in 2001. In December 2020, Brownlee joined the Cummer Museum of Art as the George W. and Kathleen I. Gibbs Director and Chief Executive Officer.

Brownlee has written four books. Her first was Charles White: The David C. Driskell Series of African American Art, Volume I, an analysis of the life and times of the 20th-century African-American artist Charles White. In 2005, she wrote with Amalia Amaki: Boxes, Buttons, and the Blues, a similar compilation piece about artist Amalia Amaki and contemporary African-American art. This was followed in 2008 by a broader analysis of African-American women in film in Cinema Remixed & Reloaded: Black Women Artists and the Moving Image Since 1970, which also acts as an adaptation of one of her exhibitions by the same title.

Brownlee collaborates with other contemporary artists for her exhibitions, which share a focus on introducing unfamiliar artists to a wider audience. In 2009, she collaborated with Karen Comer Lowe to curate Undercover: Performing and Transforming Black Female Identities, an exhibition held in the Spelman College Museum of Fine Art. The exhibit explored the reason black women artists, have a tendency to hide away or manipulate their self-image. The exhibition AFRICA FORECAST: Fashioning Contemporary Life, which she co-curated with Erika Dalya Massaquoi opened in 2016 and focused on art that documents African women's history and emotions towards clothing and fashion. The exhibition adaptation of Cinema Remixed and Reloaded was exhibited at the Havana Biennial, becoming the first time a curatorial team from the United States was invited to the event.

== Awards and honors ==
Brownlee won the Women's Caucus for Art Lifetime Achievement Award in 2005. In 2013, she received the David C. Driskell Prize for her achievements in advancing the field of African-American art and art history, and in 2015, she was awarded the James A. Porter Award for her advancement in these efforts. In 2018, Brownlee was promoted by Atlanta Magazine as being the "Best Curator of the Year".

== Selected works ==
- Charles White: The David C. Driskell Series of African American Art, Volume I
- Amalia Amaki: Boxes, Buttons, and the Blues
- Cinema Remixed & Reloaded: Black Women Artists and the Moving Image Since 1970
