= Jewish Museum (Manhattan) =

Art museum in Manhattan, New York

The Jewish Museum

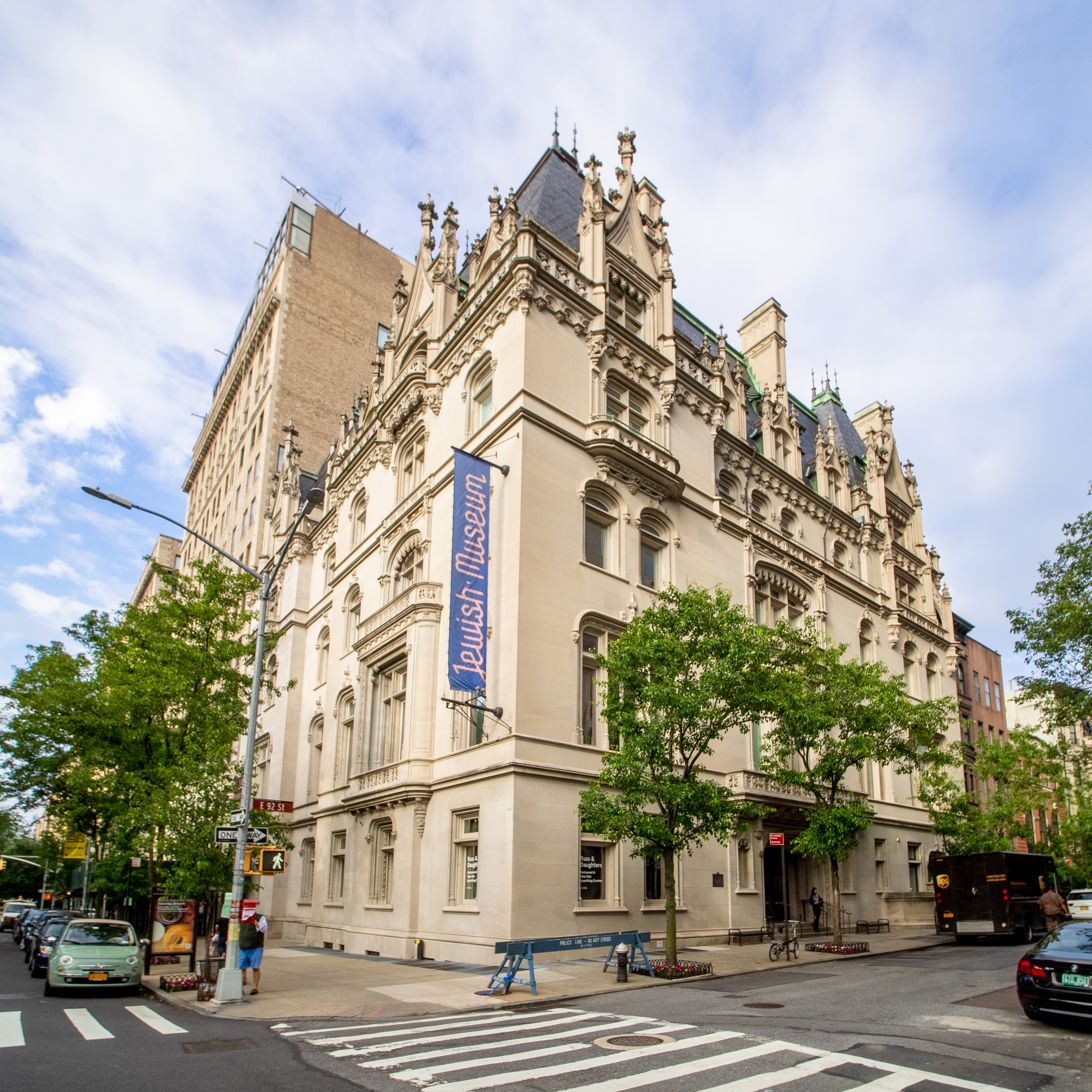
- The Jewish Museum is housed in the Felix M. Warburg House.

- Location in Manhattan
- Interactive fullscreen map
- Established: 1904
- Location: 1109 Fifth Avenue at 92nd Street, Manhattan, New York
- Coordinates: 40°47′07″N 73°57′26″W
- Type: Art Museum
- Visitors: 110,000 (2023)
- Architect: C. P. H. Gilbert
- Public transit access: Subway: at 86th Street; Bus: M1, M2, M3, M4, M86
- Website: thejewishmuseum.org

The Jewish Museum is an art museum housed at 1109 Fifth Avenue, in the Felix M. Warburg House, along the Museum Mile on the Upper East Side of Manhattan, New York City. The museum holds a collection of approximately 30,000 objects, including religious artifacts, fine art, and media, making it one of the largest museums dedicated to the Jewish culture worldwide. The museum is known for its expansive cultural and historical scope, staging art exhibitions that center "Jewish heritage and viewpoints while appealing to broader audiences".

The Jewish Museum originated in 1904 with Judge Mayer Sulzberger's donation of ceremonial objects to the Jewish Theological Seminary, later expanded through gifts and works sent for safekeeping from Poland in 1939 due to the outbreak of World War II. The museum was established in the Warburg family mansion, donated in 1944 by Frieda Warburg, and opened to the public in 1947. Originally designed by C.P.H. Gilbert in the châteauesque style, the building underwent expansions in 1959 and 1963.

Appointed director in 1972, Joy Ungerleider-Mayerson oversaw the acquisition of 600 ancient artifacts from Israel and the 1975 exhibition Jewish Experience in the Art of the 20th Century. Under Joan Rosenbaum's directorship (1981–2010), introduced new public initiatives—most notably the launch of the New York Jewish Film Festival in 1992—and completed a major renovation in 1993 by Kevin Roche, who added 11,000 square feet and modernized the facilities for exhibitions and education while preserving the building's Gothic revival character. In 2006, the museum adjusted its Shabbat observance policy by opening to the public on Saturdays. As money cannot be exchanged on Shabbat, the museum is admission-free and the cafe and shop are closed on Saturdays, and a Shabbat elevator was installed. In 2011, Claudia Gould was appointed Helen Goldsmith Menschel Director and served in this role until her retirement in 2023. She was succeeded by James S. Snyder in November 2023.

Throughout its history, the Jewish Museum has made important contributions to the study of modern and contemporary art in the United States. Described as a "leading arbiter of mid-20th-century American art", it played host to the first solo museum exhibitions of painters Helen Frankenthaler, Kenneth Noland, and Ad Reinhardt; introduced Jasper Johns to the broader public through the 1957 Artists of the New York School: Second Generation; (Note: Art dealer Leo Castelli first saw Jasper Johns's work during this exhibition, precipitating the artist's commercial success. Lubow 2020) staged the first museum retrospective of Robert Rauschenberg in 1963; and presented the influential 1966 exhibition Primary Structures that helped launch Minimalist sculpture.

== History ==
=== Founding and the prewar era ===
The collection that seeded the museum began with a gift of Jewish ceremonial art objects from Judge Mayer Sulzberger to the Jewish Theological Seminary of America on January 20, 1904, where it was housed in the seminary's library. The collection was moved in 1931, with the Seminary, to 122nd and Broadway. The Jewish Theological Seminary received over 400 Jewish ceremonial items and created, 'The Museum of Jewish Ceremonial Objects', previously the Jacob Schiff Library. The collection was subsequently expanded by major donations from Hadji Ephraim Benguiat and Harry G. Friedman. In 1939, in light of WWII, Poland sent about 350 objects to New York city from homes and synagogues in order to preserve them.

=== Permanent home and early expansion (1947–1950s) ===
Following the death of financier and philanthropist Felix Warburg in 1937, his widow, Frieda Schiff Warburg, donated the family's Fifth Avenue mansion to the Jewish Theological Seminary in January 1944 for the purpose of housing the Jewish Museum's growing collection. The museum officially opened to the public in May 1947. At the time of the opening, Frieda Warburg stated that the institution was intended not as a memorial to Jewish suffering, but as a celebration of Jewish culture, history, and tradition.

The museum initially focused on Jewish ceremonial and historical objects, reflecting the seminary's scholarly orientation and the broader interest in preserving Jewish heritage in the aftermath of World War II. In 1959, the museum added a sculpture garden designed by Austrian-American artist Adam List, offering a new venue for modern sculpture and outdoor exhibitions. This was followed by a significant architectural expansion in 1963, intended to accommodate the museum's growing collection and public programming, including the museum's Judaica collection. The new addition marked the beginning of a more publicly engaged phase of the museum's institutional history.

=== Shift to contemporary art (1962–1971) ===
The 1962 appointment of Alan R. Solomon, a Harvard-trained art historian, as the museum's director brought a contemporary vision to the institution. Solomon was oriented toward showing what he called "the new art" and organized major exhibitions of emerging American artists including Robert Rauschenberg, Jasper Johns, and Ellsworth Kelly. His programming emphasized serious engagement with living artists, including mid-career retrospectives—then rare in the museum world—and explored both Jewish content and postwar modernist abstraction. In 1963, he organized Rauschenberg's first retrospective, followed by John's retrospective in 1964. Solomon's brief tenure culminated in a commission from the U.S. government to organize the country's pavilion at the 32nd Venice Biennale in 1964, where Rauschenberg's work won the grand prize.

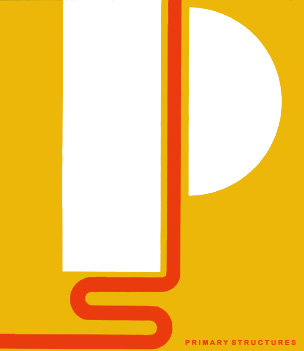
Cover of the exhibition catalogue for Primary Structures (1966) designed by Elaine Lustig Cohen

By the mid-1960s, the Jewish Museum had gained significant visibility in the contemporary art world, prompting public interest as well as debate over its institutional identity. In response to growing questions about the museum's dual mission, The New York Times published a 1965 article discussing its curatorial direction and institutional goals. The article highlighted tensions between the museum's role as a holder of Judaica and ceremonial objects and its increasing commitment to exhibiting modern and contemporary art—raising broader questions about how these objectives aligned with its affiliation with the Jewish Theological Seminary.

Curators Sam Hunter and Kynaston McShine continued the museum's engagement with contemporary art. McShine, who served as curator from 1965 to 1968, curated Primary Structures (1966), a landmark exhibition that introduced Minimalist sculpture to a broad audience and featured artists such as Donald Judd, Dan Flavin, and Carl Andre. In 1968, Karl Katz was appointed as the museum's director. This avant-garde focus peaked with Katz's controversial 1970 exhibition Software, which explored early digital art.

=== Later years (1970s–1990s) ===
In 1971, the museum, citing financial reasons, made a decision to discontinue "all exhibitions not related to the museum's commitment to the Jewish community". The decision has resulted in Katz's resignation that year. Subsequently, the museum redirected its focus toward Jewish identity and cultural heritage under Joy Ungerleider-Mayerson, who was appointed director in 1972, aligning its programming with broader trends in identity-based museum practice while maintaining its influence in shaping debates around contemporary art and culture. During her tenure, the museum shifted its focus toward Jewish themes and Israeli artists. One of her initial responsibilities as director involved securing a collection of 600 ancient artifacts from Israel, and a notable exhibition held under her leadership in 1975 was titled Jewish Experience in the Art of the 20th Century.

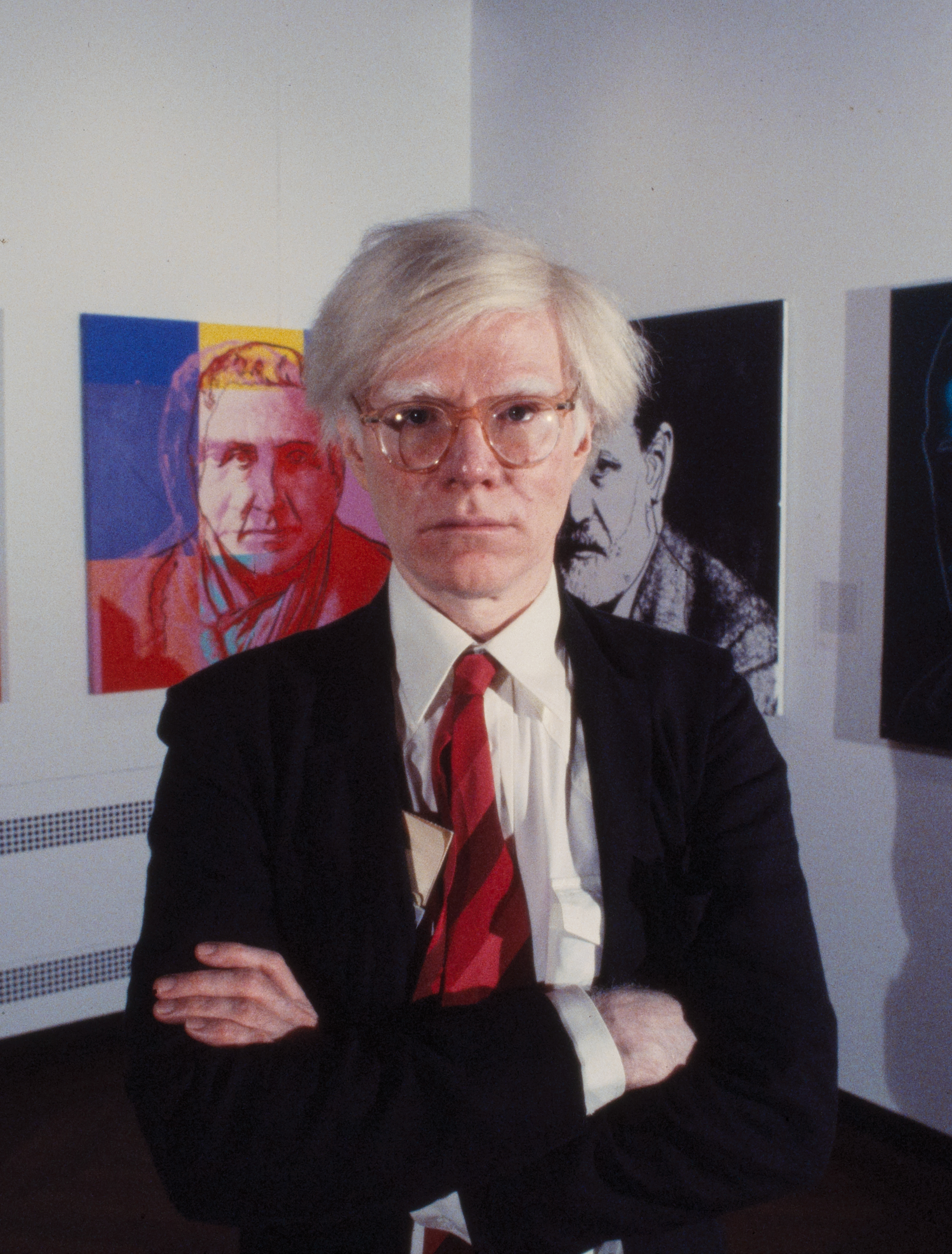
Andy Warhol at the Jewish Museum in 1980

In 1980, the museum presented Andy Warhol's Ten Portraits of Jews of the 20th Century, a series of 40-inch square silk-screened canvases produced earlier that year. The project, initiated by art dealer Ronald Feldman in response to a request from an Israeli dealer for a portrait of Golda Meir, featured notable Jewish figures such as Sigmund Freud, George Gershwin, and Meir herself. The series was highly controversial and widely criticized by art critics at the time; reviewers described it as exploitative and superficial, with The Philadelphia Inquirer labeling it "Jewploitation" and The Village Voice and The New York Times offering similarly harsh assessments. Warhol himself acknowledged minimal engagement with the subjects beyond an aesthetic interest in their faces. Despite the initial controversy, the series was subsequently exhibited in a range of Jewish cultural and synagogues across the United States, often meeting with positive reception.

From 1990 through 1993, director Joan Rosenbaum led the project to renovate and expand the building and carry out the museum's first major capital campaign, of $60 million. The project, designed by architect Kevin Roche, doubled the size of the museum, providing it with a seven-story addition.

In 1997, Jewish Museum curator Norman Kleeblatt organized Too Jewish? Challenging Traditional Identities, a multimedia show by 23 artists, which examined Jewish identity, assimilation into the larger American culture, and stereotypes. Although controversial for its provocative content—including matzoh-inspired sculptures, reimagined Jewish American Princess stereotype, and gender-bending imagery—the exhibition was noted for expanding the discourse on Jewish identity within the broader framework of identity politics in American art.

=== 21st century (2000–present) ===
Today, the museum also provides educational programs for adults and families, organizing concerts, films, symposiums and lectures related to its exhibitions. Joan Rosenbaum was the museum's director from 1981 until her retirement in 2010. In 2006, the museum broke with its longstanding policy of being closed for Sabbath observance by offering free of charge public admission on Saturdays,. Accordingly, the shop and restaurant are closed as well, following the same limit regarding the lack of money exchange from 39 Melakhot, and a Shabbat elevator was installed, becoming the first and only museum in New York City with said elevator. In 2011 the museum named Claudia Gould as its new director.

In 2020, the museum commissioned conceptual artist Lawrence Weiner to create a public work in the form of a large banner hung on the museum's facade. Facing 5th Avenue, it was titled All the stars in the sky have the same face, with text in English, Hebrew and Arabic.

In 2022, Yale University historian Michael Casper criticized the museum's exhibition on Jonas Mekas for its lack of treatment of Mekas's role in editing two pro-Nazi newspapers during World War II. Cultural historian Jeffrey Shandler told the Jewish Telegraphic Agency, "It would be problematic anywhere, in any museum. But I think it is doubly so in a Jewish museum. It really raises questions about their understanding of their mission."

The Russ & Daughters Cafe at the museum closed in 2020 due to the COVID-19 pandemic in New York City. In November 2024, the restaurateur David Teyf opened a restaurant named Lox in the museum. The Jewish Museum completed a $14.5 million expansion of the Warburg House's third and fourth floors in October 2025, designed by United Network Studio and New Affiliates Architecture. The project added the Robert and Tracey Pruzan Center for Learning to the fourth floor, which was opened to the public for the first time. In addition, four galleries were added on the third floor, an existing gallery on the third floor was expanded, and an exhibit about the museum's collection, "Identity, Culture, and Community," was added to the third floor.

== Building ==
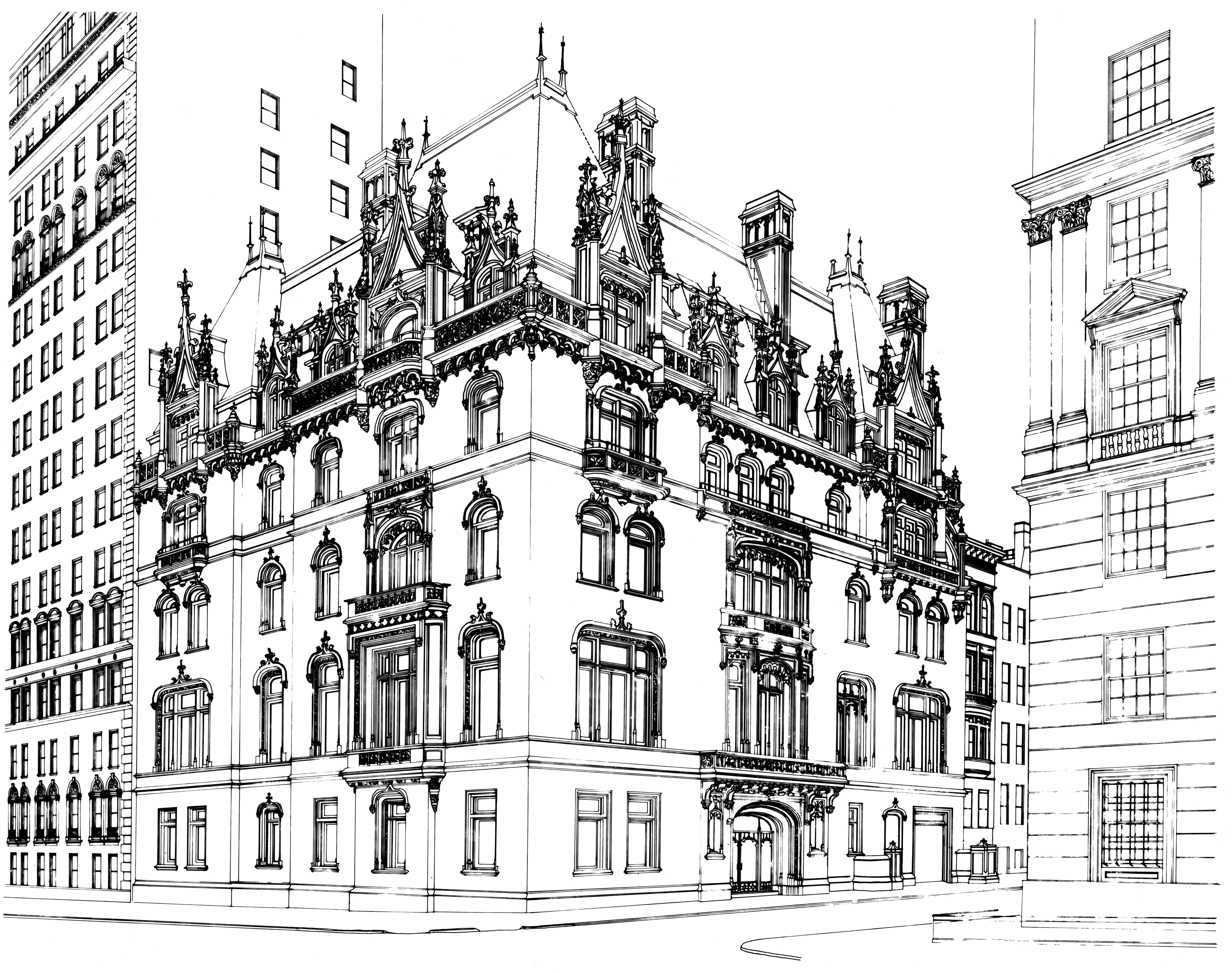
Felix M. Warburg House after expansion in 1993

The Felix M. Warburg House was constructed in François I (or châteauesque) style, 1906–1908 for Felix and Frieda Warburg, designed by C.P.H. Gilbert. François I style was originally found in New York City in the late 19th century through the works of Richard Morris Hunt. Hunt was a renowned architect throughout the Northeast, particularly in New England and was one of the first American architects to study at the elite Ecole des Beaux-Arts in Paris, France. C.P.H. Gilbert was an apprentice of Hunt and emulated Hunt's classic Châteauesque style for the Warburg house while also adding some Gothic features. The original house is built in limestone with mansard roofs, dripping moldings, and gables. This architectural style was based on French revivalism and exuded wealth, a point which Felix Warburg wanted to make to his neighbors. It featured a green yard in front of the house, which was later converted into the museum's entrance.

=== Renovations ===
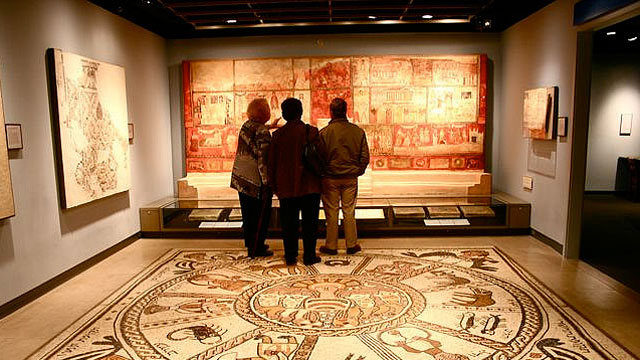
Interior exhibit of the Jewish Museum

Once converted into a museum, the architect Kevin Roche, who also designed additions to the Metropolitan Museum of Art, was selected to design additions to the Jewish Museum. After $36 million, the development of 11,000 more square feet of exhibition space, and two and a half years, Roche finished his additions in June 1993. He intended his additions to be a continuation of the museum's Gothic revival features. This is especially clear in the Fifth Avenue facade and the auditorium. The Fifth Avenue facade, made of Indiana limestone, is carved in Gothic revival style. The auditorium is set in a retrofitted Gothic revival style ballroom and finds uses for the mansion's stained-glass dome and screen. The cafe in the basement has stained glass windows.

Although these additions that were intended as a continuation of the museum's Gothic revival features, Roche also included additions that were meant to prevent the museum from appearing outdated and modernizing the facilities. For instance, Roche ensured that the education center and the auditorium would have the appropriate technology for their purposes, such as interactive visual displays.

== Collections ==
The museum has nearly 30,000 objects including paintings, sculptures, archaeological artifacts, Jewish ceremonial art and many other pieces important to the preservation of Jewish history and culture. Artists included in the museum's collection include James Tissot, Marc Chagall, George Segal, Eleanor Antin and Deborah Kass. This represents the largest collection of Jewish art, Judaica and broadcast media outside of museums in Israel. It has a collection exhibition called Scenes from the Collection, which displays works of art from antiquity to the present. The museum's collection includes objects from ancient to modern eras, in all media, and originated in every area of the world where Jews have had a presence.

== Public programs ==
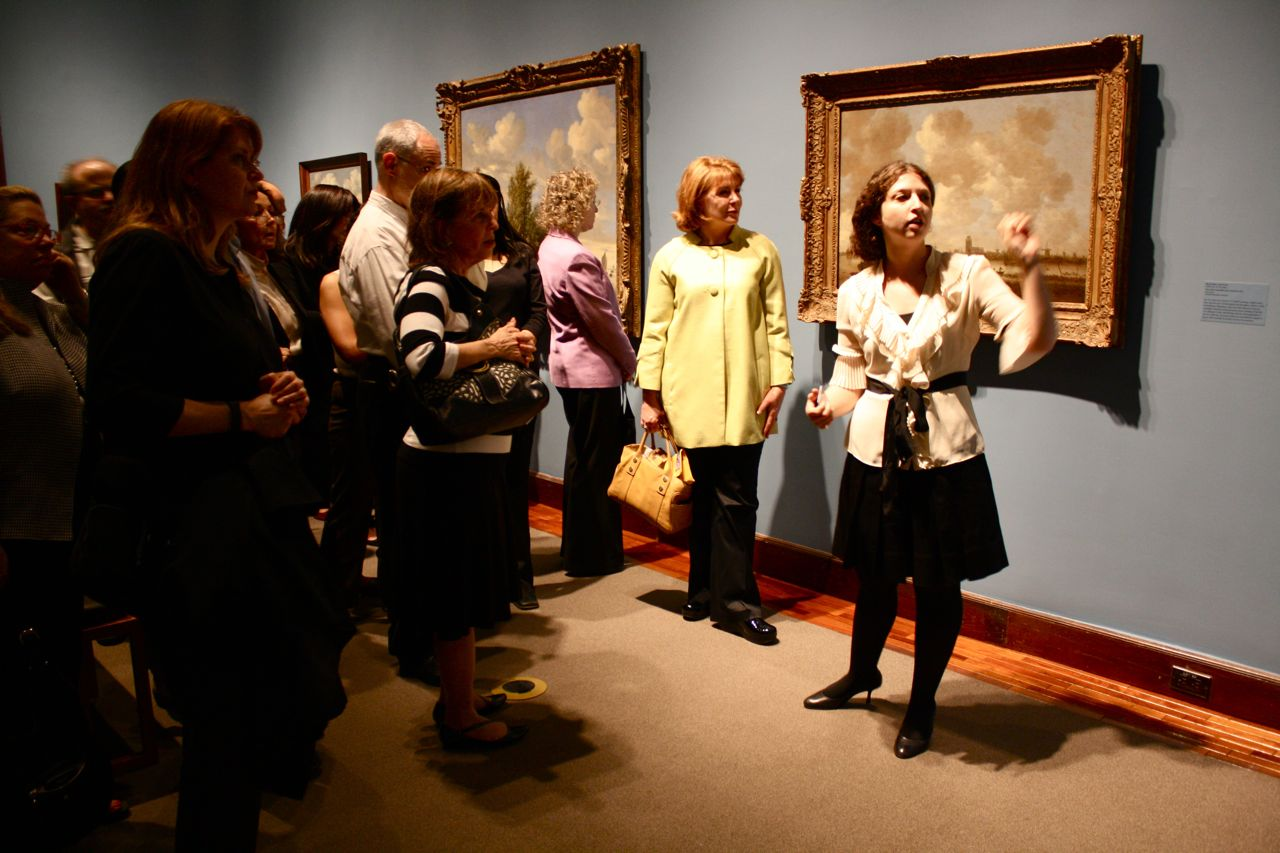
Gallery talk about the exhibition "Reclaimed: Paintings from the Collection of Jacques Goudstikker"

The Jewish Museum has a vast array of public educational programs which include talks and lectures, performances, hands on art making, group visits, specialist programming for visitors with disabilities, and resources for Pre-K-12 teachers. Programming for visitors with disabilities can take a unique and special form, with exclusive access to the museum one day a month for a program like the Verbal Description Tour. Participants are guided around sections of the empty museum by an art educator, who provides detailed, verbal descriptions of the art work, shares touch objects, and encourages discussion amongst the visitors. One participant described the ability to touch the art work as "...an honor, to be able to touch it. It felt like we were doing something so special, that other people can't do. So it actually creates an experience where you feel a connection to the art."

Programming at the Jewish Museum caters for many different constituents, from live musical performances to events specifically curated for children, and families. Events can be co-sponsored or in conjunction with other museums, particularly those located nearby on Fifth Avenue's Museum Mile. Part of the goal of family programming is to help foster a younger audience for the museum, with Sunday being "family day", with a variety of activities on offer including gallery tours, free art workshops and parent-children storybook readings. Activities are designed to cross cultures, and explore subjects that can appeal to any race or religion, such as archaeological digs or an examination of color and impressionistic landscapes.

== Management ==
Under Joan Rosenbaum's leadership the museum's collection grew to 26,000 objects, its endowment to more than $92 million and its annual operating budget to $15 million from $1 million in 1981. Rosenbaum chose to emphasize the Jewish side of the museum's identity, creating the permanent exhibition "Culture and Continuity: The Jewish Journey," while also mounting shows of modern Jewish artists such as Chaïm Soutine and contemporary artists such as Maira Kalman. In 2013, the museum's board chose Claudia Gould, former director of the Institute of Contemporary Art, Philadelphia, as its new director.

In 2015 Kelly Taxter was named one of the top 25 female curators in the world by Artnet.

In 2012 Claudia Gould hired Jens Hoffmann as Deputy Director, Exhibitions and Public Programs. In December 2017, the Jewish Museum suspended and later fired Hoffmann after several sexual-assault allegations were made against him.

=== Highlights ===
- Man Ray, Self-Portrait with Camera, 1930
- Andy Warhol, Ten Portraits of Jews of the 20th Century, 1980
- Eva Hesse, Untitled, 1963–64
- Richard Avedon, Jacob Israel Avedon portraits, 1969–73
- Adolph Gottlieb, Return of the Mariner, 1946
- Deborah Kass, Double Red Yentl, Split, from My Elvis series, 1993
- Jan Pogorzelski, Hanukkah menorah, 1893
- James Tissot, Adam and Eve Driven From Paradise, c. 1896–1902
- Alfred Stieglitz, The Steerage, 1907
- Reuven Rubin, Goldfish Vendor, 1928
- Marc Chagall, Old Man with Beard, c. 1931
- Johann Adam Boller Hanukkah menorah, Frankfurt am Main (Germany), 1706–32
- Torah Ark from Adath Yeshurun Synagogue, Abraham Shulkin, 1899

== Selected art exhibitions ==
Some of the museum's important exhibitions have included:

- Primary Structures (1966)
- The Circle of Montparnasse: Jewish Artists in Paris, 1905–1945 (1985)
- The Dreyfus Affair: Art, Truth, and Justice (1987)
- Painting a Place in America: Jewish Artists in New York, 1900–1945 (1991)
- Too Jewish?: Challenging Traditional Identities (1996)
- Assignment: Rescue, The Story of Varian Fry and the Emergency Rescue Committee (1997)
- An Expressionist in Paris: The Paintings of Chaïm Soutine (1998)
- Voice, Image, Gesture: Selections from The Jewish Museum's Collection, 1945–2000 (2001)
- Mirroring Evil: Nazi Imagery/Recent Art (2002)
- New York: Capital of Photography (2002)
- Modigliani Beyond the Myth (2004)
- Eva Hesse: Sculpture (2006)
- Action/Abstraction: Pollock, de Kooning, and American Art, 1940–1976 (2008)
- Shifting the Gaze: Painting and Feminism (2010–2011)
- Harry Houdini: Art and Magic (2010–2011)
- Maira Kalman: Various Illuminations (of a Crazy World) (2011)
- Collecting Matisse and Modern Masters: The Cone sisters of Baltimore (2011)
- The Radical Camera: New York's Photo League, 1936–1951 (2012)
- The Snowy Day and the Art of Ezra Jack Keats (2012)
- Kehinde Wiley / The World Stage: Israel (2012)
- Édouard Vuillard: A Painter and His Muses, 1890–1940 (2012)
- "Crossing Borders: Manuscripts from the Bodleian Library" (September 14, 2012 – February 3, 2013)
- "Sharon Lockhart Noa Eshkol" (November 2, 2012 – March 24, 2013)
- Revolution of the Eye: Modern Art and the Birth of American Television (May 1 to September 27, 2015)
- "Pierre Chareau: Modern Architecture and Design" (November 4, 2016 – March 24, 2017)
- "Chagall, Lissitzky, Malevich: The Russian Avant-Garde in Vitebsk, 1918–1922" (September 14, 2018 – January 6, 2019)
- "The Sassoons" Exhibit from March 3 to August 13, 2023. Review in The New York Times. Review in The Wall Street Journal.

== Gallery ==
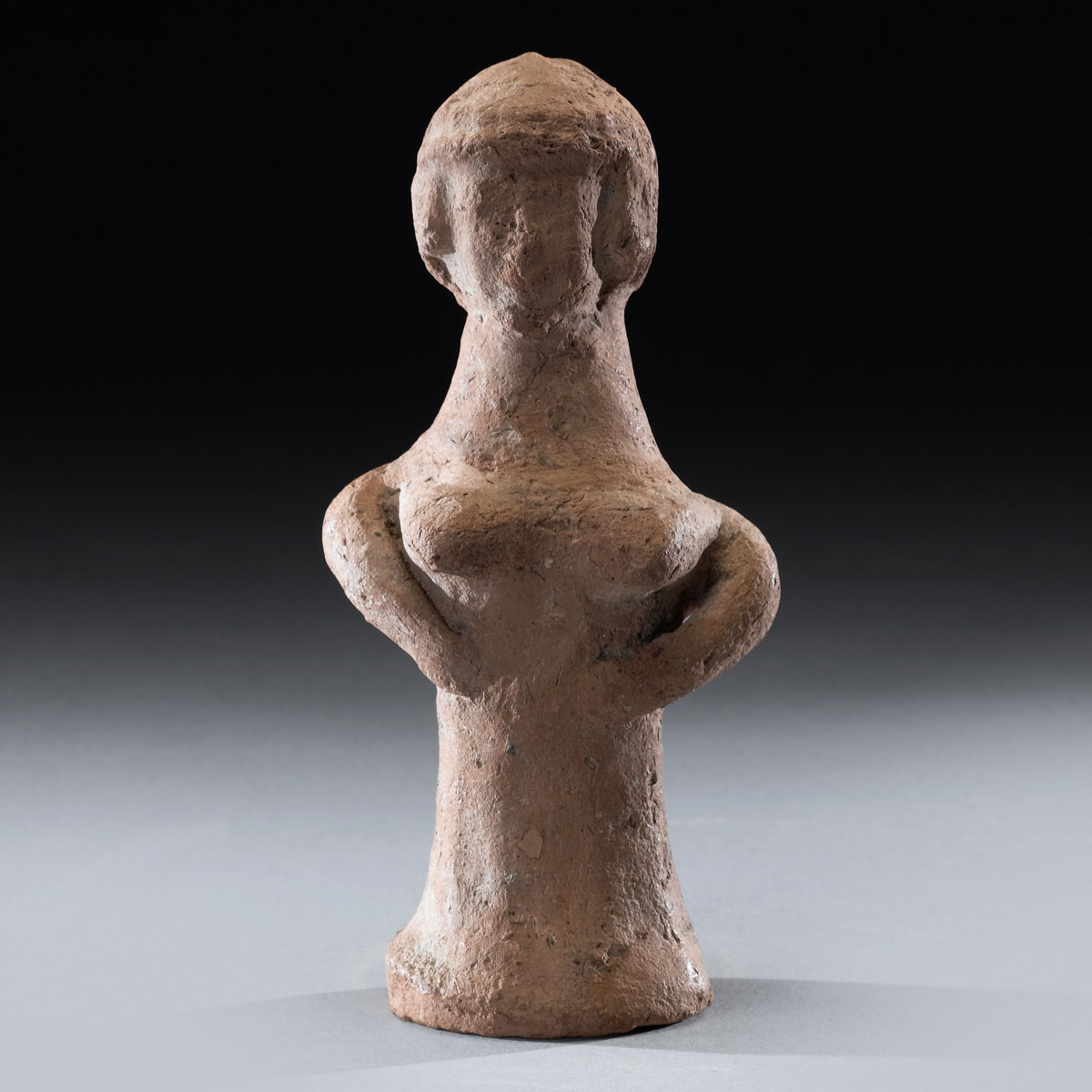
Female Figurine, Israel, 800 -700 B.C.

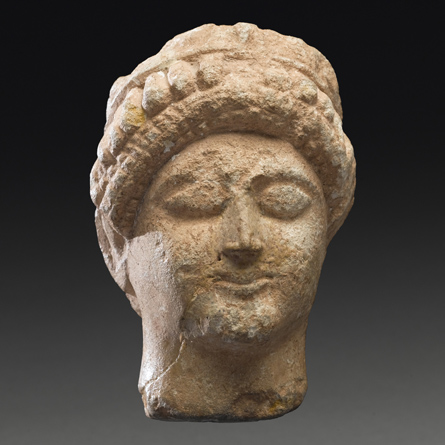
Female Votive Head Cyprus (?), early 5th century B.C.

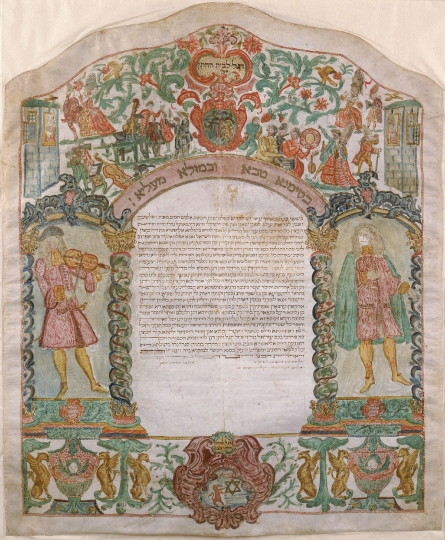
Marriage contract, from Vercelli (Italy), 1776

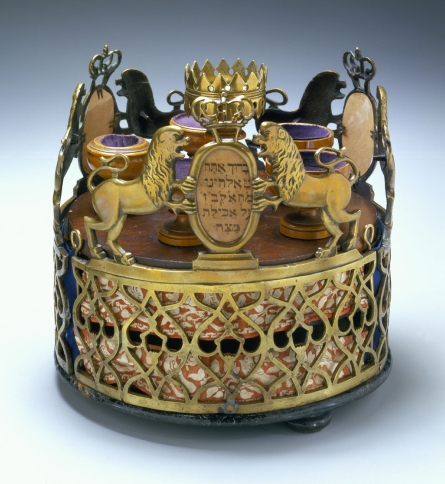
Seder Plate, Tiered Seder Set, Eastern Galicia or Western Ukraine, 18th–19th century

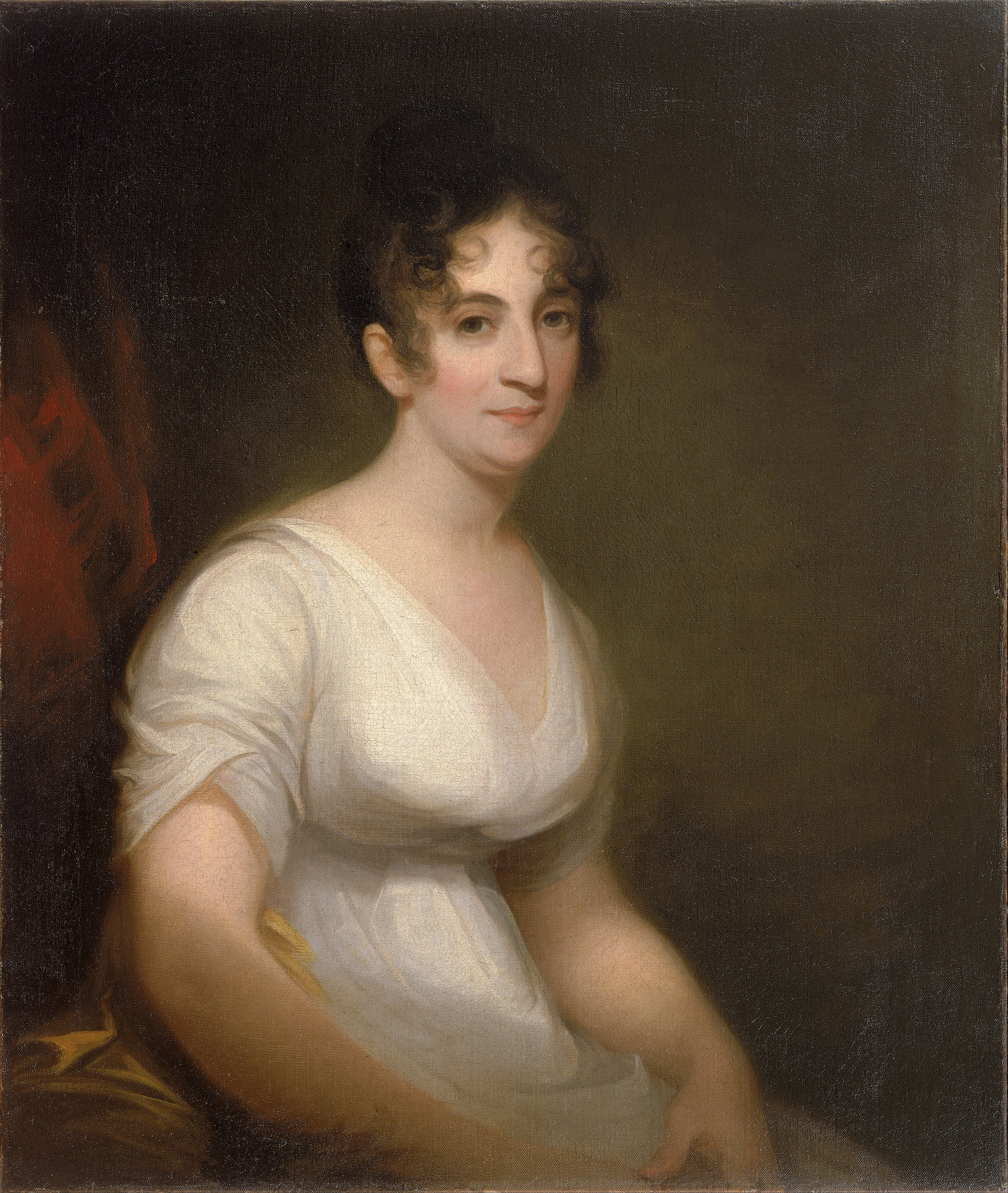
Thomas Sully, Portrait of Sally Etting, 1808

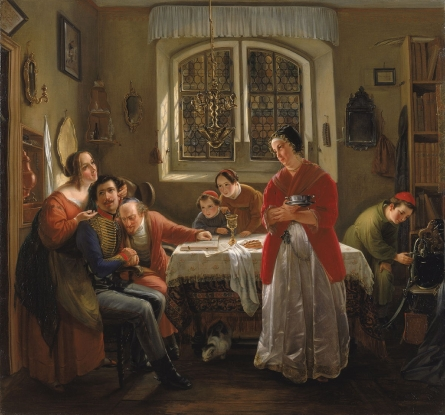
Moritz Daniel Oppenheim, The Return of the Volunteer from the Wars of Liberation to His Family Still Living in Accordance with Old Customs, 1833–34

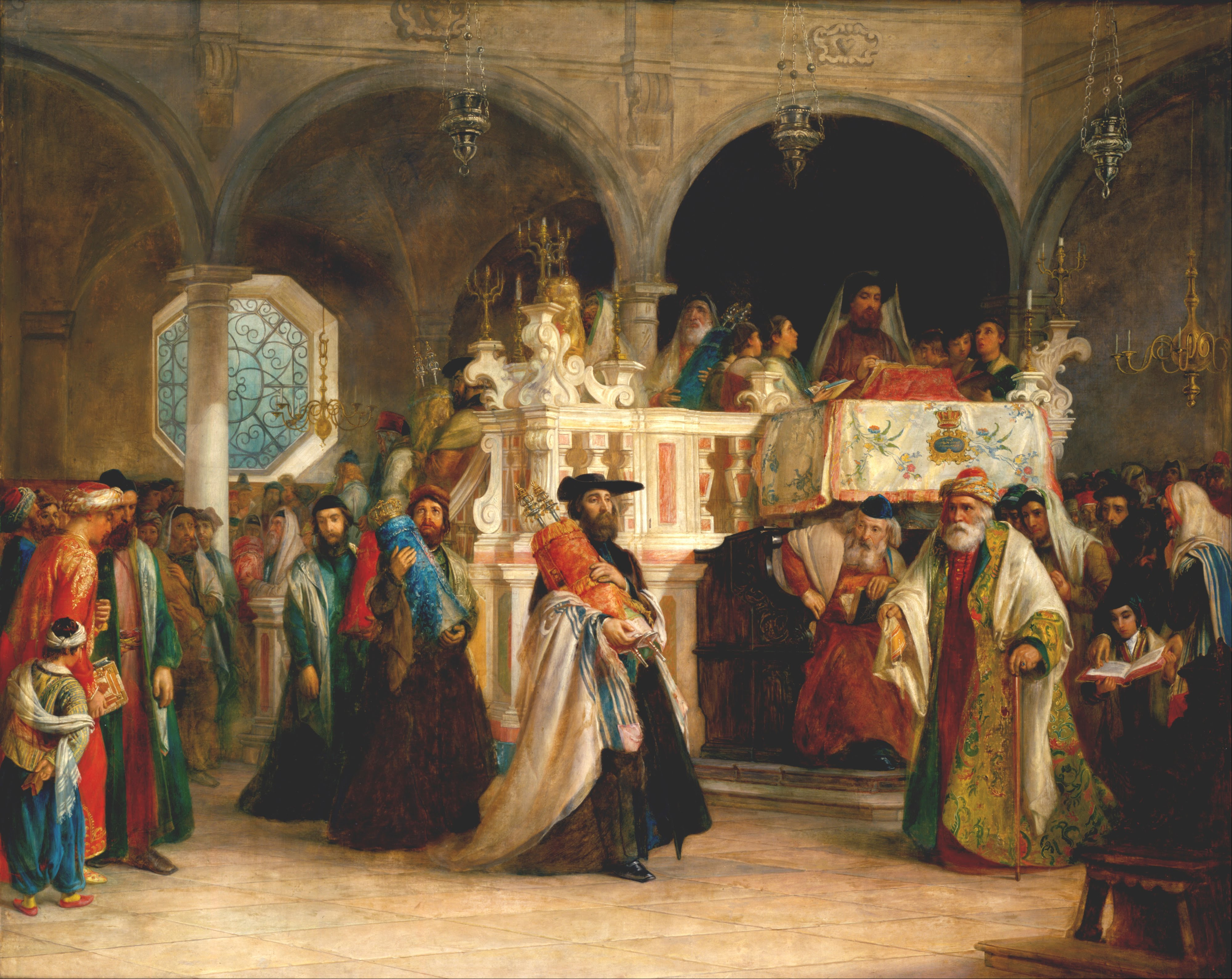
Solomon Alexander Hart, Simchat Torah at the Synagogue of Livorno, c. 1850

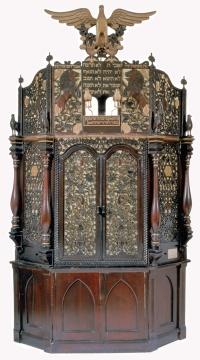
Torah ark from Adath Yeshurun Synagogue, Abraham Shulkin, 1899

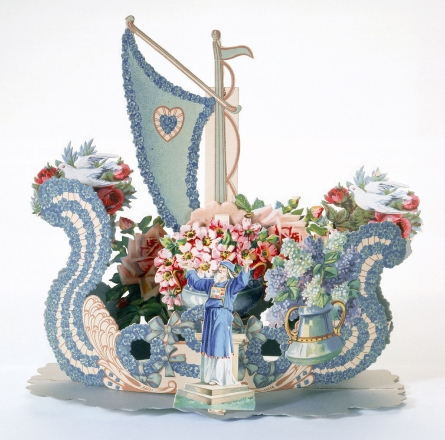
New Year Greeting, Germany, early 20th century

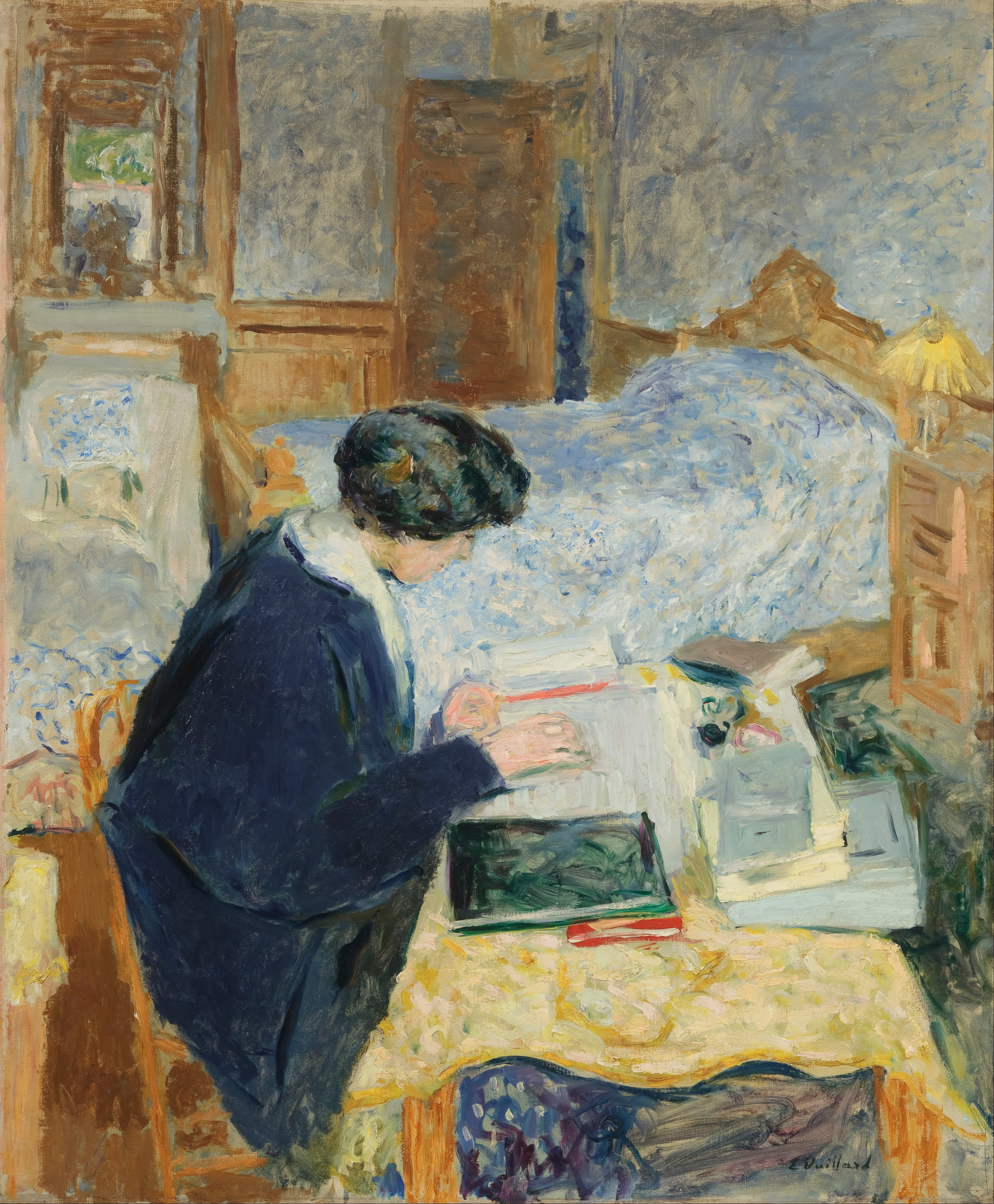
Édouard Vuillard, Lucy Hessel Reading, 1915

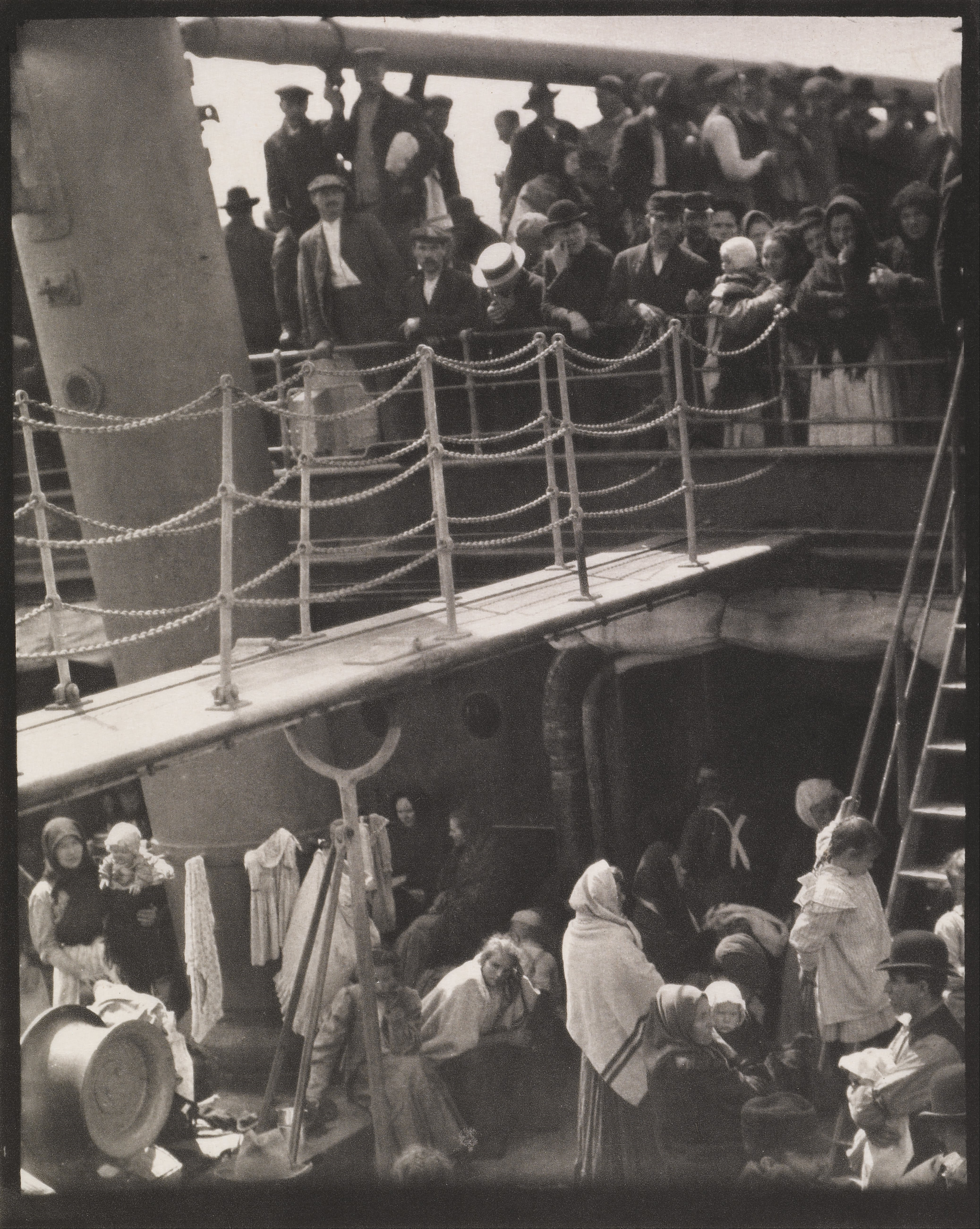
Alfred Stieglitz, The Steerage, 1907 (printed in 1915)

== See also ==
- Jews in New York City
- List of museums and cultural institutions in New York City
