= Joan Rosenbaum =

American museum curator

Joan Rosenbaum (born in Hartford, Connecticut) is an American curator and was the director of the Jewish Museum from 1981 her retirement in September 2011. Rosenbaum is a speaker and panelist on art and Jewish culture related subjects. She also wrote and published articles for the Jewish Museum as well as other institutions.

== Early life and education ==
Rosenbaum was born in Hartford, Connecticut to Jewish parents. She studied art history at Boston University and Hunter College. Later, she attended Columbia University, where she received a certificate in non-profit management.

Rosenbaum received honorary doctorates from Denmark's Knighthood of the Order of the Dannebrog (1983), the Chevalier for Arts and Letters from the Cultural Ministry of France (1999), and the Jewish Theological Seminary of America (2003).

== Career ==
From 1965 to 1972, Rosenbaum held the position of curatorial assistant in drawing and prints at the Museum of Modern Art. Following this role, she transitioned to become the director of the museum program at the New York State Council on the Arts, serving in that capacity until 1979. Afterward, she worked as a consultant at the Michael Washburn firm for a year.

In 1981, Rosenbaum took on her most significant role as the director of the Jewish Museum, where she made notable contributions and accomplishments. Numerous exhibitions were produced during her tenure as director the Jewish Museum, including the following:

- The Dreyfus Affair: Art, Truth, and Justice
- Gardens and Ghettos: The Art of Jewish Life in Italy
- The Circle of Montparnasse: Jewish Artists in Paris, 1905–1945
- New York: Capital of Photography
- The Power of Conversation: Jewish Women and Their Salons
- Too Jewish? Challenging Traditional Identities
- Action/Abstraction: Pollock, de Kooning and American Art, 1940–1976
- Schoenberg, Kandinsky, and the Blue Rider
- Houdini: Art and Magic

There were also notable presentations of individual artists, including Man Ray, Anni Albers, Marc Chagall, Chaïm Soutine, Amedeo Modigliani, Camille Pissarro, Louise Nevelson, Sarah Bernhardt, and Eva Hesse.

As the museum's director, Rosenbaum accomplished several significant milestones. She successfully boosted the museum's attendance by one-third, attracting a larger audience to its exhibits and programs. Under her guidance, the museum's collection expanded substantially, reaching a total of 26,000 objects. Moreover, she played a crucial role in securing increased funding for the museum, significantly raising the annual budget from $1 million in 1981 to a $15 million. Additionally, from 1990 to 1993, she spearheaded a project to renovate and expand the museum's building. Under her leadership, the museum underwent a significant transformation, doubling its size. During this time, she also successfully led the museum's first major capital campaign, raising an impressive $60 million for the project.

Following her tenure at The Jewish Museum, she worked as a consultant for the Devos Institute of Arts Management, and managed a charitable fun called The Malka Fund.

Rosenbaum has also dedicated several years to the Association of Art Museum Directors and the Council of American Jewish Museums, actively participating and contributing to their missions. Additionally, she serves on the board of Artis, an independent nonprofit organization that supports contemporary artists from Israel.

Rosenbaum is a speaker and panelist on art and Jewish culture related subjects. She has written and published articles for the Jewish Museum, as well as other institutions.

== Publications ==
Introductions to exhibition catalogues, among them:

- 1982: J. James Tissot: Biblical Paintings, The Jewish Museum, ASIN B00IZOCGT6
- 1983: Celebrating Rites of Passage: Judaic Treasures From The Jewish Museum, The Jewish Museum, ASIN B002ABI662
- 2004: Masterworks of The Jewish Museum, The Jewish Museum, ISBN 9780300102925
