= Spelman College Museum of Fine Art =

Coordinates: 33°44′42″N 84°24′41″W

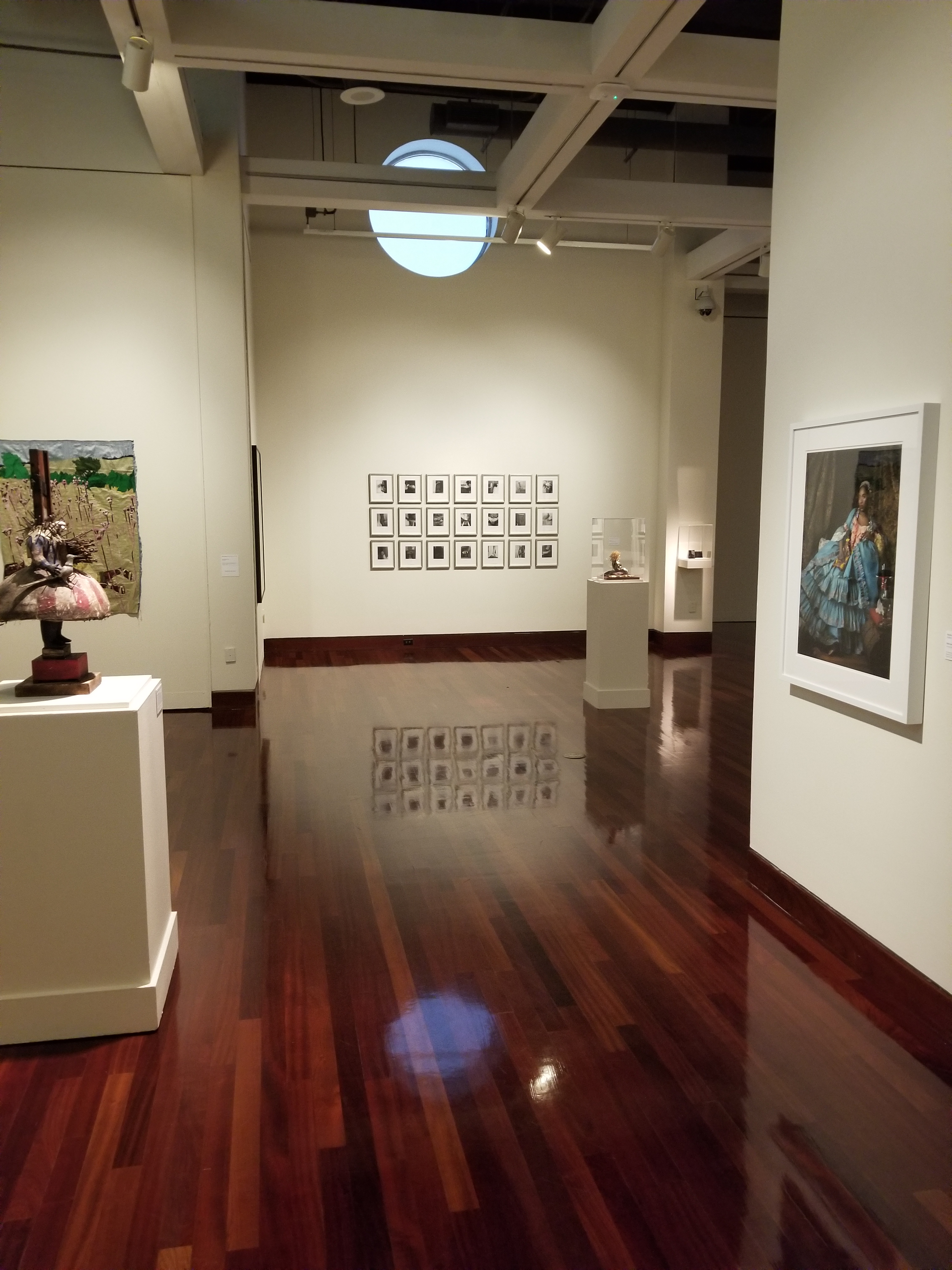
Museum of Fine Art

The Spelman College Museum of Fine Art is a museum located on the Spelman College campus in Atlanta. Prior to 2025, the museum was only housed in the Camille O. Hanks Cosby Academic Center named after philanthropist Camille Cosby, who had two daughters attend Spelman College. In 2025, the museum expanded to the newly constructed $96 million Center for Innovation & the Arts building. The museum states that it is the only museum in the nation dedicated to art by and about women of the African diaspora.

Some Black Women artists the museum has featured include Amy Sherald, Harmonia Rosales, Mickalene Thomas, Beverly Buchanan, Zanele Muholi, and Reneé Stout. Each semester, the museum features a new exhibit.

== History ==
The museum was established in 1996. Andrea Barnwell Brownlee was the director of the museum from 2001 until her departure in December 2020. Liz Andrews was named her successor in 2021.
