= Museum of Contemporary Art of Georgia =

Museum in Atlanta, Georgia, US

Coordinates: 33.7855°N 84.4161°W

- Established: 2000 (current location since 2026)
- Location: 1260 Foster Street NW; Atlanta; United States
- Director: Annette Cone-Skelton
- Website: www.mocaga.org

The Museum of Contemporary Art of Georgia (MOCA GA) is a contemporary art museum in Atlanta, Georgia that collects and archives contemporary works by Georgia artists.

== History ==
MOCA GA was co-founded in 2000 by David S. Golden and Annette Cone-Skelton to fill a historical gap in the city’s art scene. Prior to MOCA GA, there were no major institutions devoted to collecting and showcasing work made since WWII by regional artists. MOCA GA was founded to give Georgia artists a place of their own and to protect and archive the state’s history.

Established with private funding, MOCA GA began by housing the collections of Atlanta-based CGR Advisors, a real estate advisory company, and Mr Golden's personal collection. The museum's first location was at 1447 Peachtree Street in Atlanta, Georgia. The combined collection featured more than 250 works by 110 Georgia artists in a variety of mediums, including paintings, prints, sculpture, photography, and installation pieces. In January 2005, MOCA GA moved into the SunTrust Plaza for more space, but closed two years later. In January 2007, MOCA Georgia moved into Suite M1 at the TULA Art Center at 75 Bennett Street.

In September 2010, the High Museum announced that it has transferred 21 works by 14 Georgia artists to MOCA GA. The High also transferred more than 700 duplicate publications from its archives to a new reference library currently under development by MOCA GA. The acquisitions included works by Shirley Bolton and Lamar Dodd.

== Operation ==
The museum's permanent collection is composed of hundreds of works by Georgia artists. It is among the few contemporary visual arts museum which pays homage to and promotes local artists. To place its artists in a global context, the museum's exhibitions include artists from around the world (in addition to Georgia artists). The museum's programs promote the visual arts by creating a forum for active exchange between artists and the community.

MOCA GA is a Georgia non-profit art organization. MOCA GA has an estimated 9,000 visitors annually. Both modern and cutting-edge contemporary art as well as classic fine art are routinely displayed at the museum and other non-profit art institutions in Georgia. Art organizations offer spaces for music, performance art, other media, education, and other arts in addition to visual arts.

In October 2026 the museum opened its new permanent location at 1260 Foster Street NW.

== Exhibitions ==
MOCA GA's solo exhibitions exclusively feature Georgia artists, and group exhibitions often include national and international artists alongside those from Georgia. MOCA GA has mounted more than 120 exhibitions to date. MOCA GA has previously exhibited work by Martin Emanuel, Herbert Creecy, Cheryl Goldsleger, Kojo Griffin, and Hope Hilton. The exhibitions are accessible online through the museum's website after the exhibits are no longer on display.

In November 2002, the museum mounted Color, Culture, Complexity, an exhibition curated by Ed Spriggs, of the Hammonds House Galleries in Atlanta, and Dan Talley, co-founder of Art Papers magazine and former director of Nexus Contemporary Art Center in Atlanta. The exhibition, an exploration of the history and current conditions of race relations in America, highlights the works of artists from around the country and includes digital photographs by Amalia Amaki (of Atlanta and Delaware), computer-generated images by Marcia Cohen (of Atlanta), a triptych painting by Harry DeLorme (of Savannah), iris prints by Robert B. Stewart (of Atlanta), and conceptually derived digital prints by Lisa McGaughey Tuttle (of Atlanta).

== Collections ==
MOCA GA boasts a permanent collection of nearly 600 works of contemporary art by more than 200 Georgia artists. The core of the collection, which was donated by CGR Advisors and David S. Golden in 2002, features work from the mid-1940s through today. The museum is a collecting institution and will continue to collect, document, and archive significant works and documentation by Georgia artists and exhibit them.

== See also ==
- High Museum of Art
- Atlanta Contemporary Art Center
- List of contemporary art museums
