= List of Hardcore Pawn episodes =

Hardcore Pawn is an American reality television series that aired on truTV that followed the day-to-day operations of American Jewelry and Loan, a family-owned and operated pawn shop in Detroit, Michigan's 8 Mile Road corridor. The series, which was preceded by two pilot episodes in 2009, premiered on August 16, 2010.

== Series overview ==
Season	Episodes	Originally aired	
Season	Episodes	First aired	Last aired
Pilot episodes	2	December 21, 2009	
1	8	August 16, 2010	September 27, 2010
2	8	December 28, 2010	February 8, 2011
3	13	February 15, 2011	May 24, 2011
4	13	June 21, 2011	October 4, 2011
5	26	November 15, 2011	June 19, 2012
6	26	July 10, 2012	February 5, 2013
7	26	March 26, 2013	November 5, 2013
8	27	December 17, 2013	August 20, 2014
9	13	December 29, 2014	April 6, 2015

== Episodes ==
=== Pilot episodes (2009) ===
No. overall	No. in season	Title	Original release date
1	1	"Pilot #1"	December 21, 2009
Les introduces viewers to his pawn shop, and describes what goes on there every day. A woman tries to sell her guitar to Seth, but when she felt the price was too low, she turns to Les for a second opinion. A person tries to sell a monitor lizard, but Les fears he would lose more than money. A funeral home tries to sell a coffin, but Les has qualms in doing so, but not out of fear. Robo, the head of security, gets disciplined after biting another employee.
2	2	"Pilot #2"	December 21, 2009
Les talks Ashley into rejoining the pawn shop on a full-time basis. A man hocks his drum set, which was worth more because he assembled and disassembled it himself. An old woman tries to hock her gold tooth, but learns that the tooth does not have that much gold. Another man refuses to leave the shop after a pawn has gone sour.

=== Season 1 (2010) ===
No. overall	No. in season	Title	Original release date
3	1	"Dangerous Cash"	August 16, 2010
Les again introduces viewers to his pawn shop, explaining what goes on there, saying that "We don't call the experts – we are the experts." An irate customer tries to redeem her pawn of her earrings without a slip; she later returns to threaten violence, leading to Les to blame his security crew for letting it happen. A customer sells a stripper dance pole, but Les is skeptical that it would be sold. A man tries to sell a homemade cannon, but Seth trumps Les on the decision. Another man tries to sell a boat, but it was a fixer-upper. A woman sells a horse and a pony, but does it include board for the horse?
4	2	"Booze & Guns"	August 16, 2010
In light of the events in the previous episode, Les explores options to better arm its guards and family against aggressive customers; however, its dealings with a local gun shop has gone awry over the price of a holster. Ashley and Seth compete over the sale of a Jägermeister alcoholic beverage machine. A lady sells a fork lift, but Ashley's skills are questioned when she is unable to close the deal.
5	3	"Bulletproof Gator"	August 23, 2010
A customer sells a live alligator, which reminded Les of the pet gator that the shop had as its mascot before it died. A man pawns his lucky African statue and later returns – just to rub it for good luck. Another wants to sell a used bullet-proof vest, but Les wants to see it tested out first. The employees train in self-defense, to be ready if anything violent occurs. A man offers a motorcycle, but Ashley's skills are questioned again when she refuses to accept the motorcycle.
6	4	"Trouble Inside"	August 23, 2010
Les treats his employees like family, but when James, one of the pawn shop's warehouse workers turns violent it shakes up the Gold family, especially Seth. A man sells his paintball set, but the crew had it tested out on its employees first. The employees undergo gun training at a testing range. Also: a customer tries to sell 50-pairs of panties and a puppet-maker creates replicas of the staff.
7	5	"Moving Targets"	August 30, 2010
The staff deals with an irate customer after a mix-up over a misplaced gold chain. Someone tries to sell Ashley an elaborate lamp, which doubles as a "cursed" relic. Also: a Sega Double Boxing video game; and an antique Aunt Jemima bank that a customer unwittingly bought at a Ku Klux Klan convention, which the other attendees said was for target practice.
8	6	"Father vs. Son"	September 13, 2010
Les and Seth clash over a raffle gone wrong at a parking lot giveaway. Also: a man trades his 1988 Lincoln for lawn mowing equipment so he could start his own lawn business. A man sells his poker table – the price determined by a flip of a card. A woman tries to sells her piggy banks, which were in the figures of a male and female pig, as having them were against her Muslim faith. A woman tries to sell a bracelet that she claims belonged to Eva Braun, but the authenticity papers were not authentic themselves.
9	7	"Les' Big Gamble"	September 20, 2010
Les suspends one of his security guards for cursing out a customer after sitting on a couch; they then look for a replacement. Seth and Ashley argue over a sale of reptiles and hissing roaches. Also: remote-controlled helicopters, an old stadium seat from Briggs Stadium, and a man selling both a 1940s sex manual and a cleaver in a single transaction.
10	8	"Gold at Gunpoint"	September 27, 2010
Les takes Seth and Ashley to a pawn shop his grandfather started, where he and his family were involved in a robbery years ago; the visit led to Seth giving his father a 60th birthday present: a replica neon sign of that pawn shop. A transsexual dominatrix tries to sell her bondage gear at the pawn shop. A disabled person tries to pawn an accordion but ends up pawning his artificial leg. A disgruntled customer tries to return blown loudspeakers. Also: fake designer handbags; pregnant mannequins.

=== Season 2 (2010–11) ===
No. overall	No. in season	Title	Original release date
11	1	"Crazy Cash"	December 28, 2010
Les becomes concerned with Seth's growing aggression. Seth and Ashley fight over Seth's accidental sale of t-shirts without payment. A woman was refused service, as she did not have identification; however, she would not leave without a fight. An unusual customer tries to sell a DVD player as a "transistor radio" that communicates with aliens, while another attempts to sell his collection of 16 mm stag films. Les buys a converted 1989 Neoplan 38 passenger party bus from a limousine company planning to upgrade to a 55 passenger bus.
12	2	"The Big Bet"	December 28, 2010
Les bets Seth that he can sell more items, with Les having the goal of getting Seth out of the office and onto the sales floor. If Seth loses, he will have to hire a secretary. If Les loses, he will have to do Seth's job for a week. Meanwhile: a woman tries to sell her PlayStation 3, but it is her, not Ashley, who sets the price; a woman sells an old-fashioned cash register; a man argues over a busted television set, but Seth has an idea to defuse the problem; and a drunk man tries to sell his leather jacket, but Les feels that he is a menace to the shop.
13	3	"Storm's a-Brewin'"	January 4, 2011
Seth and Ashley have a feud over Ashley's diamond cutter, which escalates in front of the entire staff, forcing Les to intervene. Also: A woman could not redeem her pawn because her husband was not present; however, Ashley has a better gift for her husband. A customer tries to sell a video game unit that previously belonged to her former roommate – without his permission. A woman tries to get her computer back, but it was already sold, as she was late with her payment. The Golds are presented with a rusty old toy tractor that was bought and sold on the cheap, but could be worth a truckload of cash. And a person tries to sell a Camaro that needed repairs, but Ashley's skills are once again questioned when she did not initiate the offers.
14	4	"Desperate Pawn"	January 11, 2011
It is the first day of the month, one of the busiest days of the year for the pawn shop, and the shop is teeming with people who want to make deals; however, the Golds face off against several desperate customers who are frustrated after waiting in long lines; at one point, Les was willing to wait in line on behalf of a customer. Also: Seth and Ashley scramble to find a customer's missing guitar; and a customer sells a cache of unusual weapons.
15	5	"Skulls & Scoundrels"	January 18, 2011
A woman tries to sell her ring, but her friend interferes with the deal. Ashley becomes irate when Les butts in while negotiating with a woman over a fur coat. A couple pawns an array of goods for bills, but the husband wants to gamble away the money. A customer complains to Ashley that he was overcharged for a watch, but Les intervened after the customer was dissatisfied with Ashley's actions. A woman gets angry after Les refuses to buy her printer. A man sells a series of gems, but the price Ashley offers is more than what Seth and Les felt was proper. Also: an elephant skull and a porta-potty.
16	6	"The Gambler"	January 25, 2011
A customer pawns his gold and diamond pinky rings for gambling money. A situation escalates when a customer accuses the shop of paying him $100 less for a pawn of his camera and PlayStation 3. A tattoo parlor owner sells an OB/GYN exam table, despite Ashley going backwards in the offers.
17	7	"Fool's Gold"	February 1, 2011
A man tries to get back the items his ex-wife pawned behind his back, but they need her ID in order to redeem the tickets. A couple sells a trumpet for money for a promise ring. A tanning salon sells a spray tanning booth, but they need someone pale to test it out. A taxidermist sells a cache of stuffed animals. A woman tries to sell a 35mm camera for her son's birthday, but they no longer take 35mm cameras. Another woman tries to sell a gold bracelet, only to learn that it was not gold. A thrift shop owner sells a watch, which is a brand that is not well known; furthermore, he listed the watch on Craigslist for less than what the customer is offering the shop.
18	8	"Cash Kings"	February 8, 2011
A woman pawns various items including a sewing machine and monitor in order to come up with burial money for her recently deceased father. A man sells a shoot-up arcade game, but Les might've paid more than its worth. A woman sells her NordicTrack exercise machine, as she felt that "blacks don't ski." A woman tries to sell her gold keychain, but accuses Ashley for not giving her a fair price. A man offered to sell two used school buses, which were something that Les would love to have. A man tries to repawn his watch, but the shop did not have a record of his original pawn. A woman sells a custom-made dollhouse for money to take her kids to Disney World, and Les buys it – out of his own money.

=== Season 3 (2011) ===
No. overall	No. in season	Title	Original release date
19	1	"Hot Rods, Raging Tempers"	February 15, 2011
A man is late on his pawn payment and loses his television; however, he claims that the shop mixed the dates up. A couple comes in to ask if any of their stolen goods came in. A widowed husband sells his late wife's wedding rings, except that they are broken. A man tries to sell his funny car, except that it has no title. A woman, whose boyfriend moved out while she was away, sells her laptop. Les deals with an irate customer who complains that she was never waited on; however, things get more intense when Ashley butts in.
20	2	"Whack Job"	February 22, 2011
A long-time customer is upset at the offer she gets on an often pawned ring. A man is forcefully ejected after the clerk refused to cheat on a sale of a chain. A man comes to pawn an array of worthless goods – and a 2002 Chevrolet Monte Carlo (which doubles as his home) and a 1906 antique telephone. A young man tries to sell his fur coat and grills. A man tries to sell a baseball autographed by Lou Brock, but the ball it was signed on is worth more than its signature. Also: a music box table sold; and a dancing crazy man buys a television.
21	3	"Acid Test"	March 1, 2011
Seth has a problem with people pawning rings, but not reclaiming them, as well as having an inaccurate carat amount; he has a solution, but Les does not like what he hears. A woman tries to pawn a ring, but get abusive when Les refuses to pay the amount she wants. A man tries to sell a motorcycle, but settles for a pawn as wintertime is a bad time to sell. A couple sells a video game unit for bail money. A man tries to sell a prohibition-era whiskey barrel, but Les thought the barrel has too much information for the era; the same man then sells a suit made of monkey fur. A woman pawns what she believes is a World War II-era samurai sword. A couple comes to pawn a VCR and television, but a fight leads to only the TV being pawned.
22	4	"Gold War"	March 8, 2011
Ashley has a problem with employees doing nothing when they are not tending to customers; however, neither Seth nor Les are willing to take care of it themselves. A woman refuses to pay for a preferred customer "gold card". A man tries to sell a gold chain; however, the design was out of style, but when the customer wanted more than the market price of gold for it, Les determines how much it is worth with a coin toss. A woman in line makes a scene when Seth refuses to let her use the restroom, which are off-limits to customers; furthermore, she is a day late on her loan payment. A man sells his gumball machine to Les, who refuses to budge from his offer; Les then turns around and sells it to another customer, while its former owner is still in line collecting his money. A woman complains that her fur coat, which was in hock the last couple of years, has a tear; her husband is willing to pay for the repairs, but the woman wants much more than that.
23	5	"Family Feud"	March 22, 2011
Seth thinks that younger staff could be better sellers than older folk – including Les. A new employee wrongly refused to accept a computer for a pawn, as he felt it was "too old". A couple sells an antique gas stove for money for school books. A man tried to return blown speakers, but his receipt was lost in the wash. A woman rejected custom earrings that were made for her, as she thought that "diamond cut" meant that it had diamonds. A man sells a program for Martin Luther King Jr.'s funeral, except that it was not a funeral featuring him. Also: a man sells a military aerial spy camera.
24	6	"Bad Blood"	March 22, 2011
Les intervenes when a woman complains to an employee after she gets her laptop back with a dirty cover. A woman tries to sell her husband's collectibles, except that he did not want to part with them, or at least, not without a Richard Nixon switchplate. An employee accidentally cracks a screen to a plasma-screen TV; Seth decides who would be responsible, but the embarrassed Ashley does not like what she hears. A woman sells her grandmother's jewellery for money to see her kid, except that not all of it is real. A customer get irate when the pneumatic hammer he is trying to sell does not work. Also, a man sells a 16mm film of the Detroit Tigers in the 1968 World Series.
25	7	"Les' Revenge"	March 29, 2011
A woman only wants to pay $1 for her layaway, but when Les would not allow it, she turns to a higher authority. A man sells Seth some Detroit Red Wings memorabilia, but Les feels that the money Seth offers was too much, and some of the items he buys are just for him and not for resale – out of spite, Les later buys an old glass window that was used for the downtown Hudson's. A man tries to return a TV that he claims does not work – though it was a month before he turned it on, and he has no warranty; the trouble is – it works, and he is still not satisfied. A woman offers a body vibration exercise machine, though its side benefits bring more attention to the guys. Also: a couple sells a pedal car.
26	8	"Gold Hustle"	March 29, 2011
A woman gets irate when she was offered money for her video game system, for an amount she felt was not fair. Another woman, a regular customer, gets angry when she is late paying for her camera; Ashley commandeers the situation and refuses to let anyone else help, worsening the problem; her skills are then questioned when Seth and Les observe her with other customers. A man tries to sell a gas-powered remote-controlled car, except that he has trouble starting it up. A man pays an employee $120 for a snowblower, except that this "employee" does not work at American Jewelry. Also: a man sells an archery set.
27	9	"Sibling War"	April 5, 2011
Seth bets that Ashley can not sell more goods than him – if Seth wins, Ashley must shovel the snow in the parking lot; but if Ashley wins, she gets Seth's office for a week. A man who was cussing a blue streak tries to sell a video game system. A bass player wanted to buy a new bass to replace the one that was broken, but he only has $150 – and his gig is tonight. A woman pawns her gold tooth, but how will she be able to eat while it is in hock? A woman, whose pawn was transferred to American Jewelry, is very impatient to pay for her pawn of jewelry. A woman sells a ring given to her by her boyfriend as an "apology" for breaking up; however, she wants more than cash – she wants the clerk, Rich. Also: a man sells a vending machine that also warms the food it sells.
28	10	"Les' way or the Highway"	April 12, 2011
On another busy day, Les wants all sales staff on the floor, including those in the Internet department, despite Seth's objections; to make a point, Seth gives him a reason why they need the Internet department when Les buys collectible military figurines from a customer. A woman pays for her pawn of her TV, to which she is emotionally attached. A man wants to buy musical equipment from Rich, but he accuses Rich of selling used merchandise at prices the customer feels is improper. A drunk man tries to sell his coins and Garbage Pail Kids cards, but his behavior killed any hope of a deal. A man sells a gold and diamond ring he thought was from the Baseball Hall of Fame, but which actually belonged to someone who worked for the Yellow Pages. A woman, who was talking an unsavory language of sexual innuendo, pawns her wedding ring.
29	11	"Sucker Punch"	April 26, 2011
A woman tries to get an extension on her laptop pawn, but mistakenly got one for her TV instead. A man buys the 1989 Neoplan 38 party bus that Les bought the previous season (in "Crazy Cash") – but never returned with the money, forcing Les to find someone else to buy it. Another man offered an old violet ray device that "cures" syphilis. A man complains that he got too little money for his DVD pawn, but accuses security of manhandling him. A woman tries to sell Courvoisier bottles designed by Erté, but their boxes were damaged in a flood. A couple try to exchange the woman's earrings for a promise ring, only to discover that the earrings, which her boyfriend said he spent $1000 on, were fake. A man, facing eviction, pawns his Christopher Radko Christmas ornaments, even though Les usually does not buy ornaments.
30	12	"Melted Gold"	May 10, 2011
Les and Ashley celebrate Seth's 30th birthday in style – by pranking the birthday boy. A man tries to sell a non-working snowblower, and refuses to leave until Les buys it. Another man sells a remote-controlled hovercraft drone, but Seth buys it at a high price to spite Les. A woman wanted to pay for her pawn for her television set, but threatens Les and Rich when they refuse to see eye-to-eye on a deal. A magician tries to sell magic tricks that do not work. Another man sells a gold Fingerhut elephant sculpture, but his negotiation skills are too bizarre. Ashley tries to do business with a couple who are deaf, but Seth, who knows sign language, comes to assist. A young man talks trash with a sales clerk when he makes a sale, but even when he steps outside, the customer was not finished yet.
31	13	"I Quit!"	May 24, 2011
Ashley quits after a family feud brewed, stemming from Ashley ordering Rich to restock the sales floor with TVs – even though there were no more TVs available to be sold. A couple of women try to sell a fur coat and laptop, but they were dirty, and when refused an offer, they threaten Les with robbery. A man gets irate when his "new" TV that he is getting out of hock has been scratched up. A man pawns a gold ring, but when he did not have enough cash, he pawns his gold tooth. Also: a man tries to sell a cauterizing set from the Civil War.

=== Season 4 (2011) ===
No. overall	No. in season	Title	Original release date
32	1	"Life After Death"	June 21, 2011
American Jewelry is doing much better business since Ashley left, but Les felt that there is something missing – Ashley. A woman tells everyone to kiss her posterior when she was unable to make a deal on a diamond ring. A couple sells a rare 2009 Lee Iacocca edition Ford Mustang, but it all comes down to the best price. A young man tries to sell a couple of outdated computer monitors, but while Les is not interested, the customer tries to use his menacing attitude to force a sale. A man sells a 2004 Detroit Pistons championship ring, which would be worth even more with its box. A woman tries to sell a bracelet, but her imaginary friend disagrees.
33	2	"Return of the Queen?"	June 21, 2011
Les talks Ashley into rejoining American Jewelry, but she wants the respect she deserves, and Seth wants to avoid reigniting a family feud that led to her resignation. A man tries to sell an old laptop computer, but it has no cord. Another man tries to sell a 10-year-old TV, but the TV is too old for American Jewelry; the problem gets more complicated when the seller needs the money for his dead daughter's autopsy. Les and Seth go to a storage facility, where they buy an antique eagle statue and an old airplane propeller. A couple try to get their gold chain and TV out of hock, but things get heated between them and Ashley when they find that the clasp on the chain was broken, and even more heated when Les gets involved. A man brings in pre-Iraq War Iraqi dinar bank notes with a letter bearing Saddam Hussein's signature to sell.
34	3	"Fire Bomb"	June 28, 2011
A man tries to sell a watch and earrings, but learned from Seth that he paid much too much for them at the mall; when he refused to strike a deal with Seth and Ashley, Les had a solution. A crazy man, who thinks he was a bear, pawns his construction equipment and other items, but later attempts to buy the items the other customers wanted to sell. A customer brings in an Olympic Torch used in the torch relay for the 2002 Winter Olympics, but learns that it was not as valuable as he thought. A man gets violently frustrated when the vending machine refuses to give him a candy bar he had bought. A car catches fire in the parking lot, threatening the power lines that supply American Jewelry; the car, ironically, is owned by a fireman.
35	4	"Les Walks Out"	July 5, 2011
Les leaves to attend a business meeting, and leaves it up to Seth and Ashley to take care of American Jewelry. A couple of men were disgusted when they could not get a fair price on a watch and earring. Garbage-men sell an old entertainment center and couches to Seth, but Ashley is skeptical that he can sell them for a profit. A woman disparages Ashley when she fails to get a proper value for her designer purse. Seth trades some jewelry to a man in exchange for a signed Jackson 5 concert program, but Ashley is concerned that it had no certificate of authenticity. Seth later buys power tools from a construction worker, only that Ashley thinks that the pawn shop has too much tools already. An effeminate man tries to sell his Cabbage Patch Kids doll to Les, but accuses Les of mistreatment when they refuse to see eye-to-eye on a deal.
36	5	"Les Loses It"	July 19, 2011
A man tries to sell a series of poorly stuffed animals, leading to an unusual threat by the man against Les. A woman goes into a tirade when Ashley determines the earrings she was pawning were fake. Seth buys a cache of sports trading cards after seeing the potential value of the cards. A man pawns his diamond jewelry for $2000, but when another customer said that he should've gotten $2500, he began to have second thoughts. A couple tries to sell a piece of genital-piercing jewelry – which is too odd for even Les or Ashley. A young woman comes to get her goods out of hock, but she has no ticket or ID. Drunk, the woman calls Les the mother of all insults, and shows her disgust to Les in being kicked out of the pawn shop in a most disgusting way.
37	6	"Blood Lines"	July 26, 2011
Les refuses a car stereo for pawn from a woman as it was not in its box, but the woman blames it on her boyfriend. A woman sells an artistic statue of an old woman in a bathing suit, but when Les buys it, Seth blames Ashley for contributing to the purchase. A man tries to sell his shark costume, but when the pawn shop would not buy it, he tries to prove that his fists are worse than his bite. A man tries to sell a scale model of Olympia Stadium, but when Les was unable to make a deal, Ashley makes a counteroffer to spite Les – and Seth. A woman tries to pawn her earrings, but when Ashley refuses them as they are of little value, the customer gets into a cat fight with another customer. Fed up with the bickering between Ashley and Seth, Les decides to separate the siblings by having both run particular areas of the pawn shop and to not interfere with each other.
38	7	"Turf Wars"	August 2, 2011
At the end of the previous episode, Les separated Ashley and Seth by having them work in their own departments, in hopes that the family feud cools down; however, it boils over again when Ashley and Seth argue in front of a customer wanting to buy a stereo. A man tries to redeem his brother's pawn using false identification. Another man tries to sell a skeletal foot of his great grandfather, which was amputated during World War I. A coach of a Little League team tries to sell their team's radar gun, but his obsession with winning, and him constantly putting down his son for not playing good enough to meet his standards angers Rich. A woman complains about being overcharged for a ring cleaning, except that American Jewelry does not charge for ring cleaning. A female body builder sells her jewelry, but her presence and demeanor attracts a lot of attention.
39	8	"All in the Family"	August 16, 2011
Ashley and Seth continue to bicker over themselves as they try to complete their transactions, leading Les to the end of his rope. A big man with big speakers to sell threatens his way to the front, leading to an altercation with security – and Seth. A man tries to sell a copy of Elvis' Golden Records Volume 3 signed by Elvis Presley with a Certificate of Authenticity, but it all comes down to the record's condition. A woman, whose daughter graduated from Oak Park High School (Les' alma mater), sells her leather jacket, to get money for food. A druggie tries to sell a laptop computer and jewelry, but Seth does not want to contribute to his cocaine habit, and he does not want American Jewelry to either. A woman tries to sell her sex swing, but Les feels it is too odd – and potentially unsanitary – for the pawn shop. A man tries to sell a laptop without a charger to Ashley, but when she refused, things started to get violent between him and Les.
40	9	"Ashley vs. Rich"	August 30, 2011
Rich gets furious at Ashley over interfering with a transaction involving a layaway and a credit, in which she gave a confusing solution to a problem that she made worse; later, Rich gives instructions to the jewelry crew, infuriating Ashley, who runs that department. A man tries to pawn a fake luxury watch, but when unable to strike a deal, breaks a lamp on the way out. A man tries to sell a gold ring to pay his DWI fees, but Seth is concerned of the man's chauvinistic behavior with his girlfriend. A couple sells a statue of one of the aliens from the film Aliens; Seth thought it is dumpster material, but Ashley thought otherwise. A man tries to sell a set of Spalding golf clubs to Les, the owner of American Jewelry, but when he learns they are worth only $10, he asks to see the manager, who happens to be Les. A couple of guys try to sell a bowling ball cannon and a golf ball cannon, but when Seth refused them as they were firearms, they offer something else – a sealed pack of Army-Navy playing cards from 1903.
41	10	"New Hire. Now Fire!"	September 6, 2011
Ashley hires a woman to work at the jewelry counter, without consulting with Seth or Les. Questions about Ashely's skills are put to the test after questionable transactions by the new hire are made known by staff. Meanwhile, Rich, after his altercation with Ashley in the last episode, tries to avoid her. A longtime customer tries to sell a diamond ring, but called Seth and Les liars when he failed to get a deal. A man tries to sell a chain to Les, but when it was found to be fake, he challenges Seth to a fight. A man tries to sell his "Relax-O-Lator" coin-operated vibrating machine, designed to eliminate stress, but the price Les offers may not be enough to rid of the seller's financial stress. A woman tries to get extra loan money for her laptop, but when she failed to do so, she offers her wig of human hair that she claimed came from an Indian; when even that was not enough, she flashes Les and Seth, practically offering herself for sale.
42	11	"Seth vs. Rich"	September 13, 2011
Les orders Seth and Rich to clean up the warehouse to make room for new merchandise, but when nothing was done, it leads Les to believe that his kids are unable to run the business. Seth berates Rich for not doing the job, which leads to Rich being angered again for being accused for doing something wrong. A man tries to sell an Xbox and fake Cartier sunglasses, but his refusal to believe that Seth is a manager leads to the end of any deal. A woman pawns a gold chain, but has a strange fixation on Ashley. Another woman tries to sell a ticket for a Journey concert that she claimed was worth $100, but refused to leave when Les suspected it was fake. A couple of guys pawn a custom made chopper made by their brother before he died. A man sells a 150-year-old gold pocket watch that was in his family since it was first bought. A woman with a Gold Card tries to pawn her laptop computer, but gets irate when she could not get enough cash. Frustrated at the working environment at American Jewelry and Loan, Rich expresses his disgust at Les, only to be told that Les wants to enact a plan to hopefully bring both Seth and Ashley together.
43	12	"Drop the Bomb"	September 27, 2011
American Jewelry is celebrating its 30th anniversary, and Les wants to put on a big celebration – in five days; he assigns Seth and Ashley to plan the celebration, in which they have conflicting ideas. Also, Seth suspects that Ashley has not done her part in the planning, even though she said that her duties were already taken care of. A woman, who was tired of waiting in line to get her TV, tries to get it back herself; however, she is in for a big surprise. A man tries to get Les to buy a tattoo, which would serve as an ad for American Jewelry. Another man tries to sell a 1982 Checker Taxi cab, but it does not perform as well as it looks. A woman tries to sell her rose gold earrings, but learns that it was a base metal. An Albanian man tries to sell his 1970s Flash comic books, but when he learns that he would get way less for them, he takes out his frustration by picking a fight with another customer.
44	13	"Total Meltdown"	October 4, 2011
(Originally titled "End Days") Today is American Jewelry's 30th anniversary, and the event has a big turnout; but while Ashley's auction was a big success, things start to get tense when the cash machine that Seth ordered arrived late, and did not work. Also: When a man complains that the Wii system he bought did not include games, he threatens to blow up the store. A woman gets angry when people cut in front of her in line; to prevent any escalation, Les has a solution to defuse the problem. A man who won a riding lawn mower at the auction gets irate when the model he actually won was not the same model as the one he thought he won. And at the end of the day, Les announces to Seth and Ashley that he has plans to open a second location, and wants one of them to manage the new pawn shop.

=== Season 5 (2011–12) ===
No. overall	No. in season	Title	Original release date
45	1	"Aftermath"	November 15, 2011
Les, Seth and Ashley visit Premier Jewelry and Loan, a pawn shop in Pontiac that its owner was selling and Les has interest in buying; while Seth and Ashley are worried that American Jewelry may be spread too thin, Les is still adamant in buying the pawn shop, refusing to leave without at least attempting to make a deal. Also: a man wanting to pawn his VCR causes a scene, leading him to the front of the line, but when he tells Seth off, he is led out the door. Another man tries to pawn his fake eye, that he was currently wearing. A woman, who claims to be "Bruce Lee's sister", tries to sell her "fox mink" coat. A man tries to sell a 1971 AM General army truck, which Les falls in love with, but the cost may end up breaking the "relationship". An impatient woman was told to leave by Ashley when she refused to keep it quiet.
46	2	"Final Decision"	November 22, 2011
Les agrees on a deal to buy Premier Jewelry, upsetting Seth and Ashley, but when Les has them decide who to run the new location, they end up fighting against each other, leading to Les to make a decision himself. Also: a woman had a lot to say about her lost pawn to Les; another woman tried to pawn her laptop, but any deal with Ashley was lost when she told Ashley what to do. Another woman sells her earrings, but had to settle for less, as they were not as valuable as she thought. A man sells a bubble hockey game, but had to play a round with Seth to find out how much money he would get. An illusionist escapes out of a straitjacket, then sells it, but Seth wanted to see Ashley in it first. A man tries to sell his speakers, but when he talks trash with Seth, his mom ended up having the last word.
47	3	"Stolen Gold?"	November 29, 2011
As Les and his employees prepare the new location for new management, someone finds a bunch of jewelry in a desk; however, a former employee of that pawn shop says that he was the rightful owner of the jewelry, and wants it back, and he will not leave without a fight. Also: a couple of ladies pawn a TV, but one of them was almost too-outspoken to deal. A man tries to sell an old Big Boy statue, but his wife has a final say. A man tries to pawn his old TV and DVD player, but refuses to leave without making a deal. Two sisters, one of whom is celebrating a birthday, pawn some jewelry, but give Ashley too much information in the transaction by revealing how one got the jewelry (via sex) and plans to get tattoos and nipple piercings.
48	4	"Banned For Life"	December 13, 2011
A woman pays her pawn payment, only to get into an argument with Ashley when she also has to pay interest. A man tries to sell Seth a plasma television that does not work; he later returns to pay for his PlayStation 3 pawn, only to forget there is interest, accrued the second he receives the pawn; when he received the system, he complained that it was not his. A couple tries to sell a 1981 Cadillac hearse, complete with a coffin with a "corpse" inside; Ashley has no interest in it, but Les tries to make a deal. A man buys a pair of earrings to wear to a casino, but as his ears are not pierced, he tries to get someone at the store to pierce them then and there – a service that American Jewelry normally does not provide. A woman tries to sell a fake gold ring with Swarovski crystals, but refuses to leave after learning that even the crystals are fake, resulting in her trying to strike an unusual offer with Seth.
49	5	"Rematch: Ashley vs. Tressa"	December 20, 2011
Tressa, a former employee who was fired last season in "New Hire, Now Fire!", returns to sell the watch she bought online from American Jewelry earlier; however, her boyfriend disputes the credit card charge, claiming Tressa never got the watch. In addition, Tressa still holds a grudge against Ashley, while Ashley feels the same mutual feelings back. Also: A woman tries to sell busted speakers, but ends up giving smack talk to the clerk. A film producer from out-of-state tries to sell his badly-worn laptop, but when Les could not make the deal, the producer has some choice words for Les – and Detroit. A man pawns his dragster; while Seth is worried that it would not sell if the pawn defaults, Les thinks otherwise. A man, who claims he was abused by his boyfriend, tries to sell his television, but Les' offers causes the guy to unsuccessfully suppress a major temper tantrum.
50	6	"More Money. More Problems."	December 27, 2011
Les sends a few employees to work at the new location; however, Seth has concerns that the main store will be short staffed. Soon, Seth is proven right, when customers complain of the long wait. This leads to an argument between Les and Seth on the state of the business. Also: A man tries to pawn a watch that Les determines that it was not valuable; however, Les challenged him to sell it to anyone in the store – that is, until the man decides to shout profanities instead. A man sells a latex vacuum bed sex toy, due to the fact that his girlfriend found out that he ordered it and told him to get rid of it. Les and Bobby J. ask another customer to demo the toy, and then proposes an ultimatum to the buyer – the sex toy, or his girlfriend. A man tries to sell a stainless steel bracelet, only to get abused by his girlfriend when he learns that the store was not buying them. A man sells an old telephone switchboard that he thought was owned by Alexander Graham Bell (due to them seeing Bell System on a plate affixed to the front), but manage to get an offer from Les.
51	7	"Les Hunts a Thief"	January 3, 2012
Les noticed several items in the back room that have gone missing, leading him to suspect that one of his employees is a thief. Also: a man tries to pawn a Playstation 3, but his pawn became no good once he threatened Ashley. A woman tried to sell a laptop computer, thinking it was an iPad, but refused to believe that Ashley was a manager when she called for one. A woman tries to sell a dinosaur bone, but Les was concerned that the bone was actually from an elephant. A couple pawns a fur coat to get the funds to get jewelry out of hock, but the girlfriend threatens violence to her boyfriend if they do not get a right deal. A man sells his guitar signed by Kid Rock, despite almost walking away over a few dollars' difference from Seth's offer.
52	8	"Full Metal Panic"	January 10, 2012
Seth finds out that American Jewelry has been short on their loans for the last two months, placing the blame on the person responsible for the pawn shop's loan department – Ashley. Seth becomes even more concerned when he finds out that the clerks were offering too little money for jewelry, and that potential customers were walking away. Also: a man tries to sell tickets for a Detroit Tigers game that night, but learned the hard way from Seth that they do not sell tickets. A woman tries to sell an old 1900s drugstore sign, but while Les likes it, it all comes down to the deal. An exotic dancer tries to sell silver earrings that have little precious value; when she fails to strike a deal with Seth, she tries to flirt her way to a deal. A young man pawns a subwoofer for his car, where he lost his virginity. A man tries to sell a watch to Seth, but refuses to leave the pawn shop without the money that he needs.
53	9	"Dirty Tape"	January 17, 2012
A man, who did not have his receipt to redeem his pawn, argues with Rich over a $1 service charge. A couple of ladies try to sell a tambourine signed by Kurt Cobain and Dave Grohl, but learns that even the deceased Cobain's autograph is not that valuable. A man's computer was stolen after leaving it in watch with a stranger, and now he wants to see the security tape to see who it was; later, when Les, Seth and Ashley reviewed the tape, they were convinced that the victim is part of a scam. A couple sells a 1964 bust of John F. Kennedy, one of only two made (the other put on display in Berlin), but Les gives a special deal to the man's wife to sweeten the deal. A tattooed man tries to sell a gold ring, but threatens Ashley after thinking the deal is too low. A former exotic dancer pawns her gold chain – and gives an employee a free show.
54	10	"Only in Detroit"	January 24, 2012
Retired Detroit Red Wings ice hockey pro Darren McCarty comes by the pawn shop to sell a large alligator skin. Les and Seth later have a bright idea: hire Darren as an employee. Darren would later prove his worth when a couple of guys come in to sell a couple of Red Wings jerseys – one of them with Darren's name on it. Also: a woman tries to sell her fox fur coat, though she insists that it is mink. A couple of young men try to sell an electric guitar for money for a DNA test – when they could not get a deal, they destroyed it and left the mess for Seth to clean up. A woman tries to sell her television, but the price her aunt gave does not match the pawn shop's price; when the deal went sour, she left the television behind, as Ashley refused to carry it to her car. A woman tries to sell an arcade scale, but it needed a lot of repairs.
55	11	"Black Out!"	January 31, 2012
A storm is affecting Detroit, and Seth is concerned what would happen if the power goes out. Les thinks there should be no problem, as he has a contingency plan to keep the lights on with a backup generator. When the power does go out, it becomes a big problem when the pawn shop's computer system goes down, and Les hardly does anything to rectify it, leading to Seth to handle the emergency himself. Also: a man tries to sell a watch, but when he could not strike a deal with Seth, he mocks him instead. A woman tries to get her item out of hock, when in fact she actually sold it; when told of this fact, she threatens Les by calling her boyfriend to take action. A man sells a wine press that has been in his family for generations, despite learning that it was not as valuable as he thought. A woman sells her doll of Jacqueline Kennedy Onassis, still in box, but not only it is no longer in mint condition, as the box is damaged, the certificate of authenticity may be stuck in the box. A woman is a day late on her pawn payment for her television – which was already sold.
56	12	"Gold Battle Begins"	February 7, 2012
A customer complained that he got a television instead of a TV stand when she redeemed her pawn, leading to Les to blame Seth for not properly watching over his crew; Seth, however, contended that the merchandising system needs changing, but Les refuses to yield. But things escalate when a customer got the wrong Xbox 360 out of hock. Also: a Wisconsin man stuck in Detroit tries to sell his daughter's ring to pay for trailer repairs, but became very displeased when he learns that it is nowhere as valuable. A trans woman tries to buy a ring for a marriage proposal, which she practices on Bobby J., but things went sour very quick when her credit card is rejected, and Ashley accidentally calls her "sir". A man sells a Detroit Free Press front page of Adolf Hitler's death, but learns that the item is not as valuable as he thought. A man sells his jewellery for money to bring his fiancee, a mail-order bride from Ukraine, to Detroit.
57	13	"Gold Day in Hell"	February 14, 2012
In light of merchandise being lost and damaged, Seth decides to assign the warehouse staff to specific sections behind Les' back. However, Les overrides Seth's orders, who thinks that things are better as they are. But when the problems that were supposed to have been solved return under Les' old system, Seth gets into a shouting match with Les, with both sides refusing to yield. Frustrated, Seth gives Les an ultimatum: let him work with Les to solve the problems, or risk him leaving American Jewelry and become a competitor. Also: a woman from Brooklyn complains to Ashley that she lost her ring, but her outspokenness rubs Ashley the wrong way, especially after she finds out that the lady never had an account at American Jewelry. A man tries to sell his customized Hummer H1, but the price is too rich for Seth's blood. A man tries to sell his game system for gas money, but when Seth did not give a price he likes, he accuses Seth of being too high and mighty. Another man sells an early 20th-Century industrial fire extinguisher, but its hose affects its value.
58	14	"Face Off"	March 20, 2012
The relationship between Seth and Les remains very frosty, with both sides refusing to speak to each other, to a point where Ashley tries to play peacemaker; nevertheless, neither side is willing to yield, leading to Ashley to lure them together and force them to make up. But when both sides still refuse to forgive and forget, Les decides to let Seth operate the store his way – without Les to lean on. Also: a drunk man tries to sell Les a gold sports ring for funds to pay for his DUI conviction, but refuses to leave after learning that it was brass. A man sells a seat from the old Yankee Stadium, which he won in a charity auction. A woman tries to pawn her diamond necklace for funds to fix the windows in her car (which were broken into), but cops an attitude after learning from Ashley that it was fake. An elderly couple, hoping to get money for their son's wedding, failed to strike a deal with Les to sell their digital camera, but did have enough money to buy a gold necklace for $1000.
59	15	"Last Man Standing"	March 27, 2012
In order to prove that he can run American Jewelry, Seth takes over Les' supervision duties, while Les watches from the sidelines; however, Ashley fears that he is wearing himself too thin. Her suspicions were proven right when a man sells Seth a "new" carpet cleaner without further inspection, but a clerk later informed Seth that it was actually used and repackaged. Furthermore, on the next day, the pawn shop is short on available cash, as Seth failed to get money the day before; worse off, it is a banking holiday, and Seth's plans to have someone get more cash would not work. Also: a man tries to sell designer eyeglasses, but Les informs him he paid too much. A woman complains to Ashley that someone stolen her identity and pawned her stuff, but Ashley informs her that she is not in the system. A widowed woman sells her hospital skeleton, which Les thinks would be cool to have – if the price is right. A woman tries to sell her bowling balls, but her backtalk made them worthless to Les. A couple sells a geiger counter, but they can not agree between themselves on how much to sell it for.
60	16	"Family Traitor!"	April 3, 2012
With the pawn shop short on cash due to the bank holiday, Seth tries to find ways to get more money, but things get worse when the pawn shop runs out of the cash they already have, leading the pawn shop to suspend purchases and new pawns for the day. Furthermore, they were about to let a sale of a customer's diamond bracelet, worth $9000, slip through their fingers, when Les had an ace up his sleeve – in the safe box. This angered Seth, who would later declare war against Ashley for being a snitch. Also: a woman who believes in aliens and the 2012 prophecy pawns her guitars. A couple, breaking up as they accuse each other of cheating, tries to sell a pair of watches – one broken, the other fake – but the woman ended up starting a fight with her ex-boyfriend. Another man could not redeem his pawn as he lacked a photo ID, but said that he did have an alternate way to identify himself – his obituary. A man sells a carnival scale to Les, who ended up losing a dollar on the deal when he accidentally cussed in front of the man's son.
61	17	"Millionaire Mayhem"	April 10, 2012
Two days earlier, Les sent an e-mail to Seth, which included an order for a custom ring worth $20,000. But Seth overlooked the e-mail until now, leading him to rush to get the ring done as soon as possible. However, Ashley derailed the plan when she told the jewelry maker to put that on hold so that her necklace can be fixed. Seth then told the jewelry maker to focus only on the customer's orders, leading to a new feud between Seth and Ashley. Also: a woman tries to pawn a fake watch that she said she purchased from American Jewelry. A man sells a National cash register, but it not only comes down to price, but also to the money needed to buy his daughter new earrings. A man tries to sell his old CRT monitor for gas money, but when Seth said that the monitor was outdated, he refused to leave without a sale. A man sells a program for the funeral for Rosa Parks, but learns that it was not as valuable as he thought it was. A woman tries to sell a 1970 sex encyclopedia, but learns from Les that while tastes have not changed, the method of getting pornography changed.
62	18	"Urban Hillbilly"	April 17, 2012
A redneck farmer, hoping to start a chicken farm, tries to sell a customized, motorized tricycle, except that the pull cord for the motor broke off; later, he sold a set of Living Dead Dolls, but while the high value is out there, no one was buying them, influencing the price that Les is willing to pay. Also: a man tries to sell a necklace he believed was made of sterling silver, but when Ashley tested it out and found out that it was nothing but iron and nickel, he called her a liar. A couple tried to sell a computer printer (without ink) and an electronic organ, but when his wife berated him when they could not get a right price, another customer intervened, in which the wife started berating her. A recovering alcoholic and wine aficionado tried to sell several bottles of Bordeaux wine, but not only he was unable to get a proper price, Les and Ashley confess that they know nothing about wine. A man tried to sell a digital camera and counterfeit CDs, but when Seth said he could not take the CDs, the customer gotten extremely angry at Seth.
63	19	"Poachers!"	April 24, 2012
A man working for a competing business is buying cars, gold and pawn tickets from American Jewelry's customers, angering Les, as he feels that they're unfairly taking advantage of his customers. Also: a woman tries to sell a laptop computer, but does not know the password to unlock it. A father and his son try to sell a motorised go-kart, but its customization may be a factor in determining its price. A man tries to sell a Rolex watch, but its aftermarket alterations may affect its value. A man tries to sell his gold and diamond necklace, but after learning that the metal and diamonds are fake, he tries to flirt with Ashley to get his money. A man sells a voting machine used in the 2000 presidential election in Florida, but learns that it is not as valuable as he thought.
64	20	"Ashley's Breakdown"	May 1, 2012
After Les bought an old 1964 pinball machine from a customer, Seth informs him that there is hardly any room left in the warehouse to store it, as employees were buying merchandise that Seth feels would be hard to resell. But his opinions fell on deaf ears when Rich buys a stripper cake for $20, and Ashley buys a plastic roulette wheel for $30 (after a gamble with a customer that could have resulted in a $5 sale instead). When Seth learned of Ashley's roulette wheel purchase, Seth berated her in front of the customer, and when Seth interfered with her as she complained to Les about Seth, she quit the store in tears, to a point where she no longer wants to be taped by the production cameras. Also: a woman, who is on a verge of divorcing her husband, tries to sell her ring, but after speaking her mind to Les after he said that the diamond had flaws, she finds her ideal mate – Joe, the security guard escorting her out of the pawn shop. Another woman, whose trying to raise bail for her boyfriend, tries to sell a silver chain, but after learning from Ashley that there was not enough valuable metal to raise the money she needs, she tells Ashley that she runs the pawn shop, not Ashley. A couple of men try to sell their weed eaters, but were escorted out of the store by Les when they could not get a reasonable price from the clerks.
65	21	"Ashley's Aftermath"	May 8, 2012
Following the shouting match between Seth and Ashley that led to Ashley leaving the pawn shop, Les reprimands Seth for berating Ashley in front of the customers and employees. However, Seth still believes that employees should not buy items that they can not quickly sell. When Ashley returned to the pawn shop, not only was she still bitter at Seth, but she accused him of double standards when he bought a set of signed Detroit Tigers hall-of-famer pictures, which she believes would not sell, but Seth thought otherwise. Also: a woman, whose house was robbed, tries to sell her wedding rings to Les, but refuses to leave the pawn shop unless she gets the money she wants. A pacifier-sucking woman pawns her diamond ring and TV set, but when Seth thought that the deal would sour, she had an employee suck her pacifier for free lunch. A boys sells his iPod for money to buy a gift for his girlfriend, who his grandmother calls a "hussy". A man tries to sell his J. C. Higgins bicycle, but learned that restoration work on it has affected its value. A woman comes to request a copy of her pawn receipt, but Ashley found out that she was not in the system; despite that, the customer accused a cashier for stealing her earrings.
66	22	"Devil in Detroit"	May 22, 2012
The area has seen a rash of car break-ins, as reported by the pawn shop's customers, but when Bobby J.'s car was broken into, Les is determined to protect the pawn shop's customers and employees. When the crooks came to American Jewelry, Les is ready to deliver justice. Also: a woman tries to pawn a diamond ring, but has choice words for Ashley. A rapper tries to sell his laptop, but learns from Seth that the rap songs on his computer are not worth much. An elderly woman sells a collection of WWF action figures, but she also has a move to show Les. A tattooed man, who says he was an incarnate of the devil, tries to sell his gold jewelry. A couple of men pawn a 1912 Michigan license plate, but learns that, despite its rarity, it is not that valuable.
67	23	"Cash Money Moron"	May 29, 2012
Ashley rejects a customer's partial payment for her pawn, stressing that it is pawn shop policy to take only complete payments, but Les honors it, saying that some rules were meant to be broken, as they own the pawn shop. However, that philosophy bites them back when Les takes a trade in for a ring without a receipt, only to find out that he overstated the original price of the ring. Also: a man tries to sell his laptop, but his friend felt that it was not enough. A couple of men try to sell a few strands of George Harrison's hair, but learn that, despite its rarity, is not very valuable. A male beauty school student tries to sell his fur coat, but he is become a subject of attraction – for all the wrong reasons. A man sells his life-size Betty Boop statue, but not before saying one last goodbye. A woman tries to sell her so-called "Depression" diamond earrings, but when she could not strike a deal, she goes on a destructive rampage. A couple of men try to sell old baseball cards from the 1900s, but learns that their condition affects the value.
68	24	"You're Fired. I Quit!"	June 5, 2012
One of Seth's employees in the internet department was found slacking off watching television on company time, leading to Les telling Seth to have the department manager, John, do something about it. Later, John erroneously listed a painting of Mickey Mantle for $400 instead of its actual price, $3000, leading to Seth to order John to correct the price. But Seth found out that nothing was done when the painting sold for $400. Les then orders Seth to fire John, but knowing that John was one of the department's best employees, he gave John a second chance instead. However, it was a chance not taken when John quits instead. Also: a couple of men sell an antique theodolite to Les for $20; later, a couple, one of them a surveyor, bought that same level from Ashley for $200 as an anniversary gift. A woman threatens Les when she refuses to believe that her titanium earrings are actually silver. A gay black couple comes to pawn shop, but could not agree on anything. A woman tries to sell her television, but when she could not strike a deal with Les, offered her breasts instead. A man picks up his laptop, but complains that it was dirty, and it was their responsibility to clean it.
69	25	"Kill Em All"	June 12, 2012
American Jewelry employees have been making numerous mistakes in previous days – in addition to the Mickey Mantle painting being undersold, Les found a television on pawn that has a cracked screen, and he wants to look at the security tapes to see who did it; however, the pawn shop's video security system has been down the last couple of days. Later, Seth ended up losing $500 on a trade-in of defective designer sunglasses, as the clerk failed to mark the receipt "as is". But Les found himself at the end of his rope when he bought a die of a 1950s Chevrolet hood badge for $110, but learned after closing the deal that Rich offered the same guy a maximum of $40, as it was only half of a die, and Rich failed to stop Les from making the deal. At that point, he gave a final ultimatum – the next person that commits a mistake will be fired. Also: a man tries to return his DVDs, as he claims that they were faulty; however, he was proven wrong when Seth played one of them on one of the DVD players. Later, he returns to watch them on one of the big screen TVs, further objecting Seth's claim. A couple of men sell a massaging pedicure chair, but Ashley fears that the pedicure sink would not work. A couple of women truckers try to sell their semi-trailer truck, as one of them wants to leave the trucking profession and go to beauty school. A man cuts in line and tries to pawn his earrings, but not only angers the pawn shop clerk, but also ends up in a fight with another customer.
70	26	"Rich vs. Les"	June 19, 2012
Following the problems that occurred in the last couple of episodes, Les arranged a meeting with all its employees, telling everyone not to mess up, or they will be fired. But after catching Rich letting a woman with gold walk on too low an offer, and later, abandoning the lay-away station during a busy period, Les all but banished Rich from his store. However, Seth and Ashley felt that Les has been treating Rich very badly with his threat of termination, especially after how loyal Rich was over the last 25 years. Also: a man rifles through couch cushions looking for a ring that he allegedly lost. A man tries to sell a Zimmer-customised Ford Mustang, but Les felt that the aftermarket add-ons cost more than the car itself. A young woman tries to sell her 12-year-old TV – after pushing it several miles to the store. A man tried scamming Seth out of a mink coat, but Seth and Bobby J. could already see through his ruse. An elderly man, needing money to pay his water bill, tries to sell Ashley a bunch of old toys and baseball cards that have little to no value, saving the best – gold jewelry – for last.

=== Season 6 (2012–13) ===
No. overall	No. in season	Title	Original release date
71	1	"Rich Returns?"	July 10, 2012
Rich returns to American Jewelry to apologize for what happened in the previous episodes; Les accepts his apology and welcomes Rich back, but still warns that he'll be fired if he slips up. Rich would prove his worth when a teenager comes in with microphones that Rich suspects were stolen, taking the initiative to make sure the stolen microphones are recovered and the crook is arrested. Also: a woman tries to sell a television, but not only it is missing the required accessories, she also plays mind games with Bobby J. and Les. A man lays down on a massage table (which he calls a "sex table"), before talking dirty to Ashley, angering Les to a point where he almost strangles him. A man sells his fortune-telling napkin holders, but Les predicts that he would not get all the money for what he asked. A man wanted to borrow his computer that he has in hock so he can download his files, but unless he has the money to redeem his pawn, Seth would not let him get it back. A man tries to sell a tricked-out military truck, but Les practically fell in love with it, despite knowing that it would be impossible to make a deal.
72	2	"The Shocker"	July 17, 2012
Les complains that the internet department is not generating enough sales; to rectify this, Seth decides to have all items sold both online and at the pawn shop. However, they experience a problem when a man buys a watch online, but that same watch was sold several minutes earlier to an in-pawn shop customer, and was not removed from the website on time. Seth places the blame on Ashley, but she has a solution to the problem – use barcodes. Also: a man tries to sell a "brand new" space heater, but it looks anything but brand new. A woman tries to redeem her pawn of her golf clubs, but when she learned that she actually sold them instead of pawning them, she had some choice words for not only the "thugs" on the staff, but also for Les and his Jewish faith. A man tries to sell a Halloween prop of a man being electrocuted in an electric chair, but not only the technology for props have advanced, they also became cheaper. A man and a woman fight over a jacket, as both claimed that they saw it first, leading to Ashley to decide who should get it – no one. A shy little girl sells her rocking carousel horse, but realises that she needed to learn about an actual value of an item.
73	3	"Million Dollar Story"	July 24, 2012
Seth and Ashley suspect that Les has been buying items, in particular fireplace irons, an antique icebox and a scale used by NASA, based only on the story than the actual value; however, Les feels that sometimes buying them based on the story would end up making a profit in the end, and he tries to prove his kids wrong. Also: a woman tries to sell an electric sweeper without its cord, threatening Ashley when they could not make a deal. A man tries to sell a novelty football grill and stereo unit, but gets very angry when Seth points out that its blown speakers made it worthless. A man tries to sell his earrings for money to go to a voguing competition, but learns that the gems are not real. A woman gets angry with a clerk when she found out that she needed to pay more to redeem her pawn, but she has her friend with her carrying a Red Solo Cup, leading Seth to believe that at least she was drinking.
74	4	"Amy Got Back"	July 31, 2012
Les rehires a former employee, Amy, in hopes that she'll increase the sales of the jewellery department; however, Seth had a bad feeling about the rehire, as she had previously made several mistakes, before she left the pawn shop unannounced. But when she made the mistake of misplacing a boxed ring, accidentally giving a customer an empty box instead, Les simply chalks it up as an innocent mistake, believing that her sales outweigh her mistakes, which infuriates Seth, who still believes that rehiring Amy is a big mistake. Also: a man who calls himself "Pistol Pete" tries to sell what he thought was a 14-karat gold pinky ring, but a deal sours when not only was the ring determined to be 10-karat, but Ashley and Bobby J. make fun of his name. A man tries to sell his 13-inch tube-screen TV, but when he failed to strike a deal with Seth, due to the set being an unknown off-brand, he threw the TV – and himself – in the dumpster. A man sells his replica Harley-Davidson minibike, but finds himself in a bidding war between Les and Seth. A man tries to take his wife's items out of hock, but when Les said he could not without the pawn slip, he threatens Les through the redeem window, not thinking that there is a way out of the office. A man sells his signed Babe Ruth letter, despite not being pleased with Seth's offer.
75	5	"Tripped Out Cash"	August 7, 2012
Les buys a framed, handmade Stanley Mouse T-shirt for $60. Seth feels that the shirt is all but worthless, but was proven wrong when Rich told Les of the artist's notoriety, making the shirt much more valuable than Les and Seth give credit for. Also: a woman talks to Seth about getting "free money" when she brought in a friend, only to get angry when she was told that she misread the sign about an interest-free offer. A man tries to have his wife's ring appraised, but when his wife comes into the store, she not only accused him of stealing the ring, she practically "let him have it". A young man sells what he thought was an old, hand-operated "washing machine", only for Les to tell him that it is a fairly-new replica of a wine press. A couple of men try to sell a pair of drivable toilets, which was the most bizarre item ever offered at American Jewelry. A woman tries to get her stolen TV out of hock, but when she could not without a pawn slip, she tries to steal a TV; failing that, she tries to steal a traffic cone out of the parking lot.
76	6	"Motor Mouth"	August 14, 2012
A couple try to exchange a video game console that was sold "as is" for their kid, but did not work. However, when his wife got into an argument with Ashley and Les, Les said that he was willing to deal, but only if his wife was not present. This also irked Seth, as Les was breaking the "as is" rule that they established. Also: a woman complains to Ashley that the stones on her ring was switched while it was in hock. A magician sells his optical illusion cabinet, but when Seth and Les learn from Rich of its value, they try everything to keep it from disappearing. An elderly man pawns his computer, to get more money for his medicine. A man sells his beer-bottle shaped portable fireplace. Another man literally goes crazy when told by a security guard that he had to move his van out of the no-parking zone.
77	7	"Cold Blooded Robbery"	August 21, 2012
A security guard catches a man hiding in a refrigerator in the store, spurring concerns that he was trying to rob the store by hiding until the store closes, then robbing it. Ashley suggests that a security guard work the store after it closes; however, Les and Seth dismiss the idea, as it is already well-equipped with alarms and cameras. But Ashley's fears was realised when the store was broken in after hours, and a fur coat was stolen. Also: a man tries to get a refund on a silver chain that he bought that was defective, which he discovered after leaving the store. A hunter tries to sell a bear trap, but as its use is illegal, it would be difficult to sell. A man tries to return a cell phone that he said that he bought at American Jewelry, but he has no receipt. A man tries to redeem his pawn, but the name on the ticket does not match the name on his ID. A man sells a rare espresso machine that makes 25 cups of espresso, but the market for it is very limited.
78	8	"Les Spending Spree"	August 28, 2012
Les buys a set of Vietnam-era military field telephones and a Meyers Manx Dune Buggy. However, the warehouse is overflowing with vehicles and other items that Les bought in the past, but never sold, irking Seth and Ashley. Les failed to convince them that it takes awhile to sell the items at a price that will earn the store the most profit. To save face, Les attempts to sell a 1941 Chevrolet, but the price must be right. Also: a man gets irate when he could not show his pawn slip in order to get back his TV; after he was kicked out, he found his pawn slip – in his pocket. A woman named Marcus gets angry when the wedding ring she laid-away was sold, as she was late on her payment. A woman with extra-long finger nails sells her gold ring.
79	9	"Burmese or Busted?"	September 4, 2012
A woman wanted to sell her deceased grandmother's gems to pay for her funeral. Ashley thought that they were all nothing but glass costume jewellery, but Les still wanted the shop's gemologist to test them out. Ashley thought that having them tested would be a waste of time, but Les wanted them tested, lest risking thousands of dollars from walking out the door. After the gems were tested, Ashley was right that they all were glass, except for one, which is a genuine Burmese Ruby worth tens of thousands of dollars. Then later, a couple came in with what they thought was gold dust; as with the gems, Ashley was skeptical that it was real, but Les wanted to give it the acid test to make sure. Also: a woman loses her grandmother's ring after being one month late for her pawn payment, leading her to lose the ring; irate, she ended up hitching a ride out of the shop on a guard's leg. A woman, who lifts weights for exercise, tries to sell her jacket; while negotiating, she lifted a couple of employees as they deliberated. A man complains that his "as is" gas generator does not work; Les, reluctant to lose a longtime customer, has a simple fix to defuse the problem. A man gets angry when a television that he sold for $90 is on display for sale at $400; Seth knows that something is up when the man fails to produce a receipt for the transaction. A man tries to sell his 1960s Rock 'Em Sock 'Em Robots set, but was knocked out when he and Les could not agree on a reasonable price.
80	10	"Lawyer Up Son"	September 11, 2012
A woman comes in to redeem her son's pawn of her mother's gold ring, but was told that he had no pawns on file at American Jewelry. She later produced her pawn ticket, which Les found to be counterfeit. Refusing to listen to Les, she brings in her attorney, in hopes that he would get Les to produce the ring; however, she finds out that both her attorney and Les are honest about their work. Also: a woman gets irate when she was unable to get a refund on her non-working generator. A couple of men try to sell a Piatti scooter for $4000, only for Les find out that they're selling the exact same scooter online for $2500. A man tries to sell his DVD/VHS player, but was a cause of irritation for Ashley when he mimics everything she does. An old man, who was going deaf, sells his Segway PT, but almost rolled away when Les could not make a deal. A man tries to sell a lawn mower with an attached gadget that Seth thought was a portable vacuum, but was tossed out when he threatened to "bomb" the store.
81	11	"Seth's Big Bet"	September 18, 2012
When Ashley observes Seth buying some signed baseballs, she becomes concerned that they will not sell quickly. When he tells her that he only buys items that can be turned around quickly, he makes a bet with Ashley – if he buys the very next item that comes into the store and sells it before the close of business, Ashley must tell him that he is "the best pawnbroker in the world". Otherwise, if that item was not sold, he'll tell Ashley that she is the best. However, the bet becomes more of a challenge when the very next item that comes in – is a badger hat. Also: a woman complains to a clerk that she was given the wrong pawn ticket. A son of a notorious Detroit drug dealer named "Maserati Rick" comes in to sell his diamond-encrusted charm, as he was unwilling to follow in his father's footsteps. A man sells a prop from the 1979 television miniseries Salem's Lot, but how much he gets is decided on a flip of a coin. A man complains to Les that the "Free Diamonds" promotion is false advertising (the diamonds are free if you buy a gold item). A woman, who came to get her TV out of hock, thought that the items that were being pawned were put on display on the showroom floor.
82	12	"Oh No He Didn't"	September 25, 2012
A customer complained to Seth and Les that he was unable to pawn his watch at the Pontiac location, as he said that that location ran out of cash. This had Seth to believe that the Pontiac location was losing money, going as far as suggesting to Les that he should sell that location. However, Les steadfastly refuses to sell, as he believes that its fortunes can be turned around. Nevertheless, Seth entertains sales offers from other dealers, without the input or knowledge of Les, leading to Ashley to predict that the situation would end in a bloodbath. Also: A woman tries to exchange her diamond earrings, claiming that they were defective; however, Ashley points out to her that not only she had no receipt, but the earrings were fake. A woman requests that she gets a receipt for her television that she had taken out of pawn, but ends up in a temper tantrum when she learns that the store does not give receipts for pawns that were redeemed. A couple with a baby on the way sell their heart-shaped diamond, but almost walked out over $25 after learning that non-traditional cut diamonds were not that valuable. A man spends thousands of dollars of "God's money" on jewellery, but becomes a source of discomfort for Ashley when he starts rambling insanely. A couple of men try to sell vintage railroad crossing signs, but learn that, despite their collectability, there was no market for them.
83	13	"Oh Yes He Did"	October 2, 2012
Seth's plan to entertain a buyer from Chicago for the Pontiac location goes awry when Les had him go to that location to deliver money for the store. Seth figures out an alternate plan, in which he had Ashley meet with the buyer instead, despite Ashley's objection to the matter. But Seth's plans to keep everything a secret from Les goes undone when the buyer comes in and introduces himself and his intentions – to Les. As a result, Les tells the buyer that the Pontiac store is not for sale, and apologises to him for making the trip. Later, Seth finds another interested party for the Pontiac store, agreeing to meet with Seth there. But little does Seth know that that "interested party" is a very angry Les. Also: a woman tries to sell an empty bottle of high-end whiskey to Les, but when she began to demean him, Ashley comes in at his defense. A man tries to sell an "experimental" 1967 Ford Mustang, but its value will depend on whether or not it has the proper documentation. A woman sells a couple of UFO models that were previously used at a Red Robin restaurant. A woman gets angry when she finds out that she did not bring enough money to redeem her pawn of her laptop computer. Another woman, who was celebrating her singlehood, shops for a ring for the occasion, but when she could not agree on a price with Ashley, she demanded, in explicit terms, to have a man serve her. A couple of men try to sell a go-kart that is capable of going at 85 miles per hour.
84	14	"Family Matters"	November 13, 2012
Following the events in the previous episode, Les did not show up for work the next day until later that day, and even so, refused to talk to anyone at first, insisting that he just stay in his office. His action had cost at least one potential sale – a man who wanted to sell his Matryoshka dolls walked out when he was unable to deal with Ashley and was not able to speak with Les. Eventually, Les returned to work on the sales floor, not in a forgiving mood, but willing to get the moment behind him. But things began to heat up again when a group of women were involved in a fight. When a security guard noticed that one of them had a gun, it became very dangerous, very fast, in a situation that ended with a cliffhanger. Also: a man began to turn violent against his girlfriend when they found out that their gold necklace, which he paid $5000 for, was worth only a loan for $250. A man sells a copy of The Detroit News from the day of John F. Kennedy's assassination with a misprinted headline "Kill Kennedy", along with a later edition with the correct headline "Kennedy Dead". A transaction with a couple of men, who were selling stereo speakers that they bought off a truck, turned violent when they refused to listen to Seth's explanation that they bought worthless white van speakers. A woman with no identification and papers tries to redeem her pawn on just her name alone, but got hairy fast after Les got in the picture. A couple of men sold a World War II-era diving helmet lamp, but did not get much because it was a replica.
85	15	"Pay to Play"	November 20, 2012
Continuing from the previous episode, it was first thought that the woman who was driving away had a gun, but instead she was reaching for something else as they drove off. However, Les was very grateful for Seth as his son for saving his life, even though there was no gun. But as a business associate, he felt that Seth needs to earn back his trust. Seth got his chance when a couple of men came in with a Fender Stratocaster electric guitar which they claim was from 1951 or 1952; they wanted a minimum of $30,000 for it. However, Seth knew there were fakes on the market, leading him to take a close look at the parts, but what he found was neither real nor fake, but instead a guitar composed of various parts from the 1950s, forcing the sellers to make a deal that would not break the bank. Also: a man tries to sell a pair of padded swords for a live action role-playing game, but ended up losing to Ashley in a duel. A man tries to sell a beat up hot rod, but learns that historical value does not equate to monetary value. A woman tries to claim her money for a phone-in appraisal of her earrings, only to learn that American Jewelry does not provide such a service. And pro wrestler Lex Luger comes in to sell his robe for charity.
86	16	"Shell Game"	November 27, 2012
A customer complains to Les that a con man was running a three-card Monte operation in the parking lot; Les initially dismisses the complaint as a customer who needed more money, but the complaint was proven true when a security guard catches the con man in the act. Also: a woman tries to sell a broken watch; not only was the watch not accepted by Seth due to its condition, but the customer also acted in an impolite matter, not only ordering that she get her cash, but also spitting on the floor. A man tried to redeem another person's pawn without identification or papers, but has taken Ashley's offer to let him buy something instead; however, he started to run for it when he told Ashley that he intended to shoplift instead. A couple of men tried to sell a pair of sumo wrestling suits that they bought for a bachelor party, but while Seth and Ashley had fun playing in them, the sale price would only be a mere fraction of their purchase price. A man sells a placard for an NFL Players strike, with signatures of the striking players, after "striking" a reasonable deal with Les.
87	17	"Gold Meltdown"	December 4, 2012
Kane Hodder, an actor who played Jason Voorhees in four of the Friday the 13th films, comes to American Jewelry to have a gold pendant featuring Jason's trademark hockey goalie mask; however, it needed to be done right away so Kane can wear it at a local horror film convention. However, when Les was testing a torch when he was testing a customer's purported bar of gold to see if it was real, he mistook the Jason mask as a piece of scrap gold, leading him to blame Seth for miscommunication. As a result, the pendant had to be remade in four hours, or risk getting it delayed and losing potential customers in what Seth perceives as a new line of business for American Jewelry. Also: A woman gets irate when she tries to redeem her pawn of her television and computer; she gets even more upset when she learns that she was late redeeming her computer pawn. A couple of men fight like "children", leading to Ashley to play mommy and send them to time out. And a man tries to sell his Clay-Adams female anatomy model, but learns from Les that novelty does not equate to value.
88	18	"Vintage Victory"	December 11, 2012
Ashley dismisses a neon Vernors Ginger Ale sign and an old, rusted Monark bicycle as worthless, but when Les proves her wrong, she gave her a challenge on deciding whoever takes in the most-valuable vintage item. Ashley buys a set of sterling silver cups from Tiffany and Co., while Les buys a pair of restored gasoline pumps. One will learn that what is inside may not necessary equate to victory. Also: Seth enters into a conflict with a New Jersey man, who wanted to redeem a pawn for his girlfriend who is already back in Jersey, except that he has no slip or proof. A stranded construction worker from California had choice words for Les and Detroit after failing to reach a deal for his watch. And a customer desires to buy a television that she thinks is a model on sale, except that the model that she wanted is a more-expensive model.
89	19	"Ashley's Bad Day"	December 18, 2012
Les and Seth become concerned after noticing that Ashley was exhibiting rudeness and poor attitude toward the store's staff and customers; however, she had cause for acting lousy – they have forgotten her birthday that day. But little does she know that it was all a game. Also: a couple of rednecks try to sell an outdated computer and monitor, but get angry when knowing that it was worthless. A serial killer enthusiast attempts to sell some disturbing items associated with Charles Manson. And Rich considers reaching a deal on an interesting drum set – by having a drum-off with the seller.
90	20	"Motor City Dream Cruise"	December 25, 2012
During Detroit's annual Woodward Dream Cruise classic car event, the employees, especially the Golds, attempt to sell as many automobile-related products as they can, but when Les decides not to purchase an old Chevrolet "bow-tie" logo sign from the North American International Auto Show, Seth makes a deal with the customer, angering Les. At that point, Les challenges Seth to find a buyer for the sign before the Dream Cruise ends.
91	21	"Unforgiven"	January 1, 2013
Les becomes concerned about Rich after he noticed that he spent too much time talking to a customer on a deal for a call box; however, Seth defends Rich's actions, as he felt it was simply good business. Les, still sore over Seth's attempt to secretly sell the Pontiac location, refused to give him the benefit of the doubt. Later, Rich accidentally left about $7000 worth of gold jewelry alone in front of a customer, while checking on the sale price of one of the items. In response, Ashley, who has seen what happened, told Rich that what he did was bad. Rich apologised for his actions, which Ashley and Seth accept. Les refuse to accept the apology, as Rich has not regained his trust and Les still has a grudge against Seth over Pontiac. Also: a woman tries to sell a flat-screen TV, but hopes to sell the item diminished when she accidentally broke the screen. A man tries to sell a huge rocking horse – which he transported in a horse trailer. Another man gets very upset when Seth could not make a sufficient deal over a laptop. And a man sells rare glass negatives of baseball legend Babe Ruth.
92	22	"Junkyard Intervention"	January 8, 2013
Seth notices that the back room of the warehouse has been full of nothing but items that are either broken or no longer work. As these items have no resale value, Seth has suspicions that Les is a hoarder, and has Rich call for a dumpster to haul the junk away. However, Les refuses to part with the items, as he intended on either fix them or sell off the parts. But he never done so, and Seth feels that he'll never will.
93	23	"Watch Out"	January 15, 2013
Les buys an Audemars Piguet Royal Oak Offshore watch from a collector for $5000, after carefully examining the watch. However, Seth told Les that he should have done some research on the watch's serial number before he bought it, on the off-chance that it may be counterfeit. Seth's suggestion had fallen on deaf ears for Les, until he showed him the outcome on a verification website, which caused Les to turn livid. After calling the seller back in to confront him (on word that Les was interested in another watch), the seller returned the money, but told Les that he was taken too, by a seller that sold the fake watches to him, before selling them to Les.
94	24	"Les' Mojo"	January 22, 2013
After Les was almost burned by the counterfeit watch deal in the last episode, Seth and Ashley become concerned when a few deals went awry: a man came in wanting to sell his 1948 Ford F-1 pickup, but ended up walking all over Les after Les pointed out a few flaws on the vehicle. Later, another man came in to sell his bingo equipment and accepted Ashley's $350 offer, only for the offer to be overridden by Les, in which he could only pay $200; the customer rejected the new offer and left. And Seth was about to offer a customer $60 cash for a 50th Anniversary Erector set, only for Les to change the offer to $40 store credit instead; Seth kept his own offer on the table, which the customer accepted. But when a customer came in with a Volkswagen Minibus used by Jack Kevorkian for his assisted suicides, Seth and Ashley saw it as a golden opportunity for Les to rebound, provided that the customer does not control the deal with his six-figure introductory offer.
95	25	"To Catch a Thief, Part 1"	January 29, 2013
Jeff notices a ring on the floor close to his workstation, but after conferring with Les, he chalks it up as a clumsy accident. However, his suspicions are heightened when he finds some scrap jewelry on the floor, leading to him and Les concluding that an American Jewelry employee is a thief. After a check on the security cameras yielded nothing due to technical problems, Jeff decides to create a sting operation as a way to catch the thief in the act. Also: an unruly customer threatens Les with death, resulting in a call to the Detroit Police Department when security found him too tough to handle. And Seth wonders if they can sell a pair of size 21 sneakers worn by Shaquille O'Neal, which are taking up a lot of space on the sports shelf – along with some sports jerseys.
96	26	"To Catch a Thief, Part 2"	February 5, 2013
Continuing from the previous episode, the following day, Les, Seth and Jeff look at the video footage of the thief after he had taken the gold ring purposely set up as part of the sting operation. After examining footage from previous days, they not only found their thief, but, they also found themselves feeling sick and betrayed, as the thief was none other than Joe, American Jewelry's head of security.

=== Season 7 (2013) ===
No. overall	No. in season	Title	Original release date
97	1	"Frisky Business"	March 26, 2013
Following Joe's arrest in the previous episode, the employees were shaken up by the events. However, they expressed further displeasure when new security measures are implemented to make sure that no one steals anything. But when Seth announced that all employees' bags will be searched upon leaving the store, Les and Ashley thought that he went too far. But that was not far enough when Seth also wanted body searches, which he actually carried out despite Les and Ashley's warnings that it may lead to legal troubles for the store. Also: a man tries to sell a 19th-Century nautical compass for $150, but learns the hard way not to fool with Les when he discovered that that man was selling the same compass online for $33. A woman agreed with Les to sell her Blues Brothers statues for $300, but changed her mind after the deal was made, after her friends told her to hold out for more. A man wanted to buy an electric generator after losing power due to an unpaid bill, but refused to deal with Seth – or even leave the store – when he was unable to take it home to try it out first. And another man, unable to sell his ring because Ashley found it to be fake, found himself thrown onto the floor by Byron, the new head of security, when he tried touching Ashley.
98	2	"Short Staffed"	April 2, 2013
The day after Seth imposed his body search policy on his employees, the ladies that worked the redeem windows all took sick leave, leaving Les and Ashley to believe that the new policy is causing them not to come in. But it would later become possible that they will never return when an employee told Ashley in a phone call that Seth's new policies may cause her to quit.
99	3	"Monster Deals"	April 9, 2013
After Seth rescinded his invasive search policies for American Jewelry's employees, the ladies that worked the redeem windows return to work. But Seth has a new problem – profits are down, and he is looking for creative ways to get new customers into the store. Ashley has an idea that she tried out – an inflatable gorilla with a banner reading "monster deals". However, Seth has a better promotional plan, which would explain why a couple of customers told Ashley to quit.
100	4	"Tipped Off"	April 16, 2013
The staff had been receiving complaints from customers that a staff member had been letting customers cut in line in exchange for a $3 tip. They would later find out that Anton, who works the pawn desk, had been doing the evil deed. Les had decided to let Anton off with a warning, as he had been with American Jewelry for several years and is otherwise a trusted employee. However, Seth wanted Anton fired, as he was still burned over another trusted employee who was later arrested for theft – Joe the head of security.
101	5	"Redeem Girl Rumble"	April 23, 2013
Noticing that one of the employees was discontent with working the same redeem window each day, Seth decides to have them work different windows. However, Les becomes angered at the situation, as he felt that the arrangement was good enough as it was. But his own discontent falls on deaf ears when Seth insists on keeping the new assignments, leading to the employees to come close to fighting, and Ashley to play the role of peacekeeper.
102	6	"Busted"	April 30, 2013
Jeff calls in sick, leading to Seth to order everyone to stay away from Jeff's desk in any circumstance. But when he caught Bobby J. near Jeff's desk, polishing a ring for a customer, he almost fires him, only to rescind the dismissal when Bobby J. told Seth that Les gave him permission to polish the ring. This led to Seth's argument with Les, in which he said that the policy applies to everyone, leading to Les to determine that Seth had become more security-hungry following Joe's arrest, and Ashley wishing that both men stop the bickering.
103	7	"Watch Your Back"	May 7, 2013
Les sells a valuable Breitling watch for $42,000 to a trusted watch collector that he dealt with many times before; however, he did not have the cash at the moment, so Les gave him the watch in exchange for an IOU. Seth, however, had misgivings about the deal. The man later said that someone else will pay him the money as he leaves out of town; Seth still had bad feelings about it, but Les still has trust in the customer. But Les would end up getting an expensive lesson in trust when the customer pays him for the watch – with over 40,000 watchbands.
104	8	"American Jewelry & Zoo"	June 4, 2013
Following the debacle involving the 40,000 watchbands, delivered in over 100 boxes, American Jewelry has found themselves with limited space for anything else – this includes "antiques" and "collectibles" that Les buys, but Seth and Ashley thinks are worthless junk, such as a 1950s salesman's sample model of an above ground swimming pool, a Christmas display from the old J. L. Hudson Department Store, and several taxidermied animals. The kids think the "junk" would not sell, and neither would the watchbands, but Les tries to prove them wrong, starting with a taxidermied boar's head. Also: a woman in labor and without a job buys an old rocking horse for her child from Ashley at a special rate, with Ashley covering the difference, but it ended up being a scam when her false belly fell out. And a man attempts to get a refund without receipt for a store brand "Cherokee" watch that he passed off as a "Rolex".
105	9	"Les Sells Out"	June 11, 2013
With over 40,000 wristbands to sell and stored in 130 boxes, Les decides to sell the watchbands one by one, starting at $2 apiece. While Seth and Ashley remained skeptical of the whole idea, they did not realise that in the end, all it takes is a little showmanship – and some friends in the business.
106	10	"You Bet Your Butt"	June 18, 2013
Seth and Ashley each make a series of bets to see if either of them, or Les, can purchase any item that comes into the store that they would otherwise dismiss as "junk", including a "Major Savings" mascot costume and a rusted out Mobil Oil Pegasus logo. But when a set of first-class airline seats (the actual seats, not tickets) come into the shop, they get Les involved in the wager to see whether or not the seats will be bought – the loser will take over the janitor's job for the final hour of the day.
107	11	"Homefront Heat"	June 25, 2013
Seth notices that Ashley was low-balling on, or rejecting outright, various items that he would otherwise give higher deals on. In addition, the deals were often broken due to Ashley's rudeness. But when Seth's interference angers Ashley, Les intervenes in order to make peace. Also: a crazy man brings in a bass fiddle case, but the item inside is not a bass fiddle, and the man would not let Les look inside.
108	12	"Strike Out"	July 2, 2013
Ashley continues to lowball and mistreat customers to Seth's detriment, but an argument in front of a customer over a signed 1970 Detroit Tigers baseball, which led to the customer walking out and calling the two "unprofessional", has led Les to the end of his rope, to a point where he sends both of them home the rest of the day. However, the kids' frequent bickering may be harming not only his business, it may also affect his health.
109	13	"Les Goes Down"	July 9, 2013
The day after Les' anger over Seth and Ashley's sibling rivalry boiled over, he gave them an ultimatum – if the bickering does not stop, they will be fired. However, the infighting continued anyway, to a point where they neglected to restock the TVs, leading to an unhappy customer literally tossed out of the store by Byron, and to Les and Bobby J restocking the TVs themselves. But during the day, the infighting had affected Les' health, to a point where he collapsed in the warehouse while handling the TVs for restocking.
110	14	"Bad Trouble Here"	July 30, 2013
While Les remains in hospital following his collapse, Seth and Ashley jointly took over operations at the pawn shop; however, the bickering continues, to a point where Ashley takes over Les' office. However, they later find out that nothing will keep Les in the hospital for long – not even a hernia (which was what he actually collapsed from). While he was convalescing, Les had thought of a solution to end the infighting once and for all – whoever of the two does the best job that day will become manager.
111	15	"The Trouble with Michael"	August 6, 2013
Michael is a regular customer at American Jewelry, but the feeling is not mutual among the clerks, as everything he brought in was all but worthless. Ashley does not want him back anymore, and Bobby J especially has a hatred toward Michael, but Seth says otherwise, in the event that Michael actually had something of value. However, when Michael offered a car without a title, Seth felt that he was at the end of his rope – until Michael offered a gold chain that might bring in thousands of dollars. Also: speed painter Dave Santia tries to paint Les' portrait in ten minutes in hopes to get money.
112	16	"Seth in Charge"	August 13, 2013
Seth, who is Les' hand-picked manager, had an idea in order to speed up the lines and improve efficiency – give out pawn tickets and cash in the same line, instead of separate lines for each. However, Seth's plan had resulted in longer lines and irate customers, to a point where Les reconsiders having Seth in charge.
113	17	"Back in Action"	August 20, 2013
Les, now fully back in charge following his hernia operation, puts the staff on notice that everyone's job is at risk – including Seth and Ashley, who Les says contributed to a drop in American Jewelry's revenue in all departments. Because of that, he placed both on probation, subject to the close, watchful eye of Les, and would remain there until Les determines that they can do their work properly.
114	18	"Back To The Hustle"	August 27, 2013
A couple of young men inform Les and Seth that their computer was stolen by one of their employees as part of a scam, in which not only they would get cash for pawning their computer, they would also get the computer back then and there. However, Ashley uncovered evidence that proved that the real scammers are the "victims".
115	19	"Seth Snaps"	September 3, 2013
Since Ashley resumed being a manager, she felt that she had every right to order Seth around, as he was still on probation. However, Ashley's regimental behavior was concerning Les, thinking that she is being a little too rough on Seth – this included her criticizing Seth for buying things that she felt would all but take up space. But things come to a head when Ashley buys a 1950s Eljer toilet for $10, leading to Seth to buy it for $20, just so he can destroy it with a sledgehammer, before abruptly leaving the store angry.
116	20	"Computer Crash"	September 10, 2013
Following his flip out in the previous episode, Seth chose to stay home. But when the computer system goes down, Seth has no choice but to come in and repair the system. But when an irate customer, who was already frustrated with having to wait until the system goes back up in order to redeem his pawn of a ring, he was given a wrong ring, owing to duplicate numbers on the pawn slips. This led to Seth and Ashley to work to retrieve the correct ring before the impatient customer returns.
117	21	"All-American Jewelry and Loan"	September 17, 2013
A Christian Reverend sells Seth a rare baseball signed by Babe Ruth, complete with authentication papers. Knowing that the ball would be worth tens of thousands of dollars if genuine, Seth takes a risk and gives the Reverend a $1000 deposit, while he has it sent out to be verified. But when it came back as counterfeit, Seth and Les fear that they would not get back their $1000.
118	22	"Breakdown at Tiffany's"	September 24, 2013
A man brings in a 160-year-old Tiffany watch, which has no markings identifying it as such, other than the name on the watch face. The watch was sent to Tiffany to verify it, but they refused to take a look at it unless they own the watch. However, the man asks for $40,000 – the value of the insurance that Tiffany purchased to send it back – but says that he could get $100,000 for it. This led to Les trying to make a $150,000 bet that the man would not get more than $40,000 for the watch.
119	23	"Gold Crash"	October 15, 2013
When the price of gold, which had experienced record highs in value, began to fall, the staff worry that they would end up losing money. As a result, Les, Seth and Ashley become more conscious on what items they buy, and only choose items that can make a profit on short order. But when Les buys memorabilia from the last remaining Bill Knapp's restaurants for $200, Ashley fears that it would not sell.
120	24	"Harold's Gamble"	October 22, 2013
Les offers to buy a diamond-encrusted Audemars Piguet watch from a customer. After being burned by a similar deal earlier (in Season 6 episode Watch Out), Les had his watch expert take a close look at it. However, while the expert determined that the watch was real, a serial number check came up as counterfeit, leading to Les to question the abilities of the expert.
121	25	"The Outsider"	October 29, 2013
With the price of gold continuing to drop and the store still losing money, Seth determines that part of the problem resides in purchasing items that are slow- or no-sellers, a cluttered sales floor, and a 50,000 square foot warehouse that is overloaded with junk that Les refuses to part with. To help solve the problem, Seth brings in a consultant to determine the best solution to the problem. But while everyone was interested in what he was saying, the only person who was reluctant to any change was Les.
122	26	"Seth's Secret"	November 5, 2013
Seth feels angered when Les dismisses the suggestions that the consultant from the previous episode had suggested. But after Seth disappeared from the store for no reason, Les was the one feeling hurt when he found out that Seth was at Bill's Pawn Shop, a competing pawn shop, out of fears that Seth was quitting American Jewelry and joining the competition.

=== Season 8 (2013–14) ===
No. overall	No. in season	Title	Original release date
123	1	"Seth's Return"	December 17, 2013
After Les secretly found out that Seth was at Bill's Pawn Shop, Les confronted him, asking Seth why he would betray the family by visiting a competing pawn shop. Seth explained the real reason: he was branching out into consulting as a sideline – the very thing that another person that Seth hired tried to do for American Jewelry earlier. As being a consultant is tantamount to disclosing family secrets to strangers, Les gives Seth a choice: "Family, or nothing."
124	2	"Fishing for Trouble"	December 24, 2013
On the last day of the Dream Cruise, Les buys what claimed to be the world's largest fishing lure, which was actually an art piece saluting Michigan, for $3000. Les is very certain that he'll sell the big lure for a profit, but Seth has serious doubts.
125	3	"Scent of Deception"	December 31, 2013
In the back room, Ashley smelled an odor that was a lot like marijuana, giving her and Seth a suspicion that someone is using pot on the job. Les singled out two back room employees who he thought had used pot, but after they turned down high-dollar bribes and their drug tests came up negative, they found themselves back at square one.
126	4	"Growing Pains"	January 7, 2014
With the price of gold still falling, the Golds continue to find alternate ways to make money. This time, Les acquires a shipment of televisions from an unclaimed freight wholesaler, which have been returned or rejected by retailers. The only problem is where to put them all.
127	5	"Daddy Daughter Dance"	January 14, 2014
Les becomes skeptical of Ashley's ability to sell after taking a misstep in selling a taxidermied bobcat, leading to Seth to create a challenge for Les and Ashley – the person who sells fewer items in monetary value than the other person must work the "hard goods" line for the final hour of the day. This challenge was a true challenge for Les, until he came across a potential "Hail Mary" opportunity.
128	6	"Drama Online, Part 1"	January 21, 2014
The online department's sales have been slacking off, leading Seth to suggest that the items that have been on the shelves too long get top priority online. Les agreed, but to Seth's chagrin, Les had Ashley join the department as co-manager with Seth. However, Ashley included items that were not supposed to be for sale on the list of items to be sold – including the Olympic torch from the 2002 Winter Games (featured in Season 4 episode "Fire Bomb"), which not only ended up being sold, it also ended up being lost in transit, making Seth even more livid.
129	7	"Drama Online, Part 2"	January 28, 2014
Ashley contacts the shipping company to get the status on the Olympic torch that had gone missing; failure to find its whereabouts would mean a discussion with Les, who does not know what happened to the torch. However, the situation becomes more dire when they found out that the torch was destroyed, due to the shipper's policy against shipping flammable materials. After Les found out about what happened, he found both Seth and Ashley at fault, leading him to take over the online department himself. Also: Muhammad Ali Jr., the son of Muhammad Ali, sells Les his father's boxing gloves and robe; however, while genuine, the price will depend on the fight and any paperwork relating to the bout.
130	8	"Seth's Soft Side"	February 11, 2014
A couple, in need of money to pay their bills, sell a pair of Gretsch electric guitars to Seth, who paid $1800 for the pair. However, upon further inspection, Seth feared that he paid them too little for the guitars.
131	9	"Seth's Gamble: Part 1"	February 25, 2014
Seth purchases a lot of collectible baseball cards on an online auction for $7000, with hopes of making a profit by selling them individually online. However, he bought the lot without consulting Les first. However, Les eventually found out about the purchase; as a result, he gave Seth an ultimatum: sell the entire lot in one week, or he'll be paying for it out of his own money.
132	10	"Seth's Gamble: Part 2"	March 11, 2014
One week had passed since Les knew about Seth's $7000 purchase of baseball cards, and so far, he made $2500 off of what he already sold. However, he had until the end of the day to sell the remaining stock, or he would have to pay for whatever remains. Seth found a card dealer willing to buy the remaining lot, but whether or not Seth would still had to cover the remaining costs with his own money would depend on the outcome of the deal.
133	11	"Guards Go Home"	March 25, 2014
Security guard Byron and his co-worker, Hook, were sent home by Seth (upon orders from Les) after being caught playing practical jokes on customers and other co-workers. However, Seth and Ashley wonder how secure the store would be without a security guard in the store.
134	12	"Busted Deal"	April 8, 2014
When Les began to take in unclaimed merchandise that he acquired earlier in the "Growing Pains" episode, Seth and Ashley were concerned that they did not have enough room in the warehouse. And a shipment of TVs that was part of the deal has yet to arrive, yet the warehouse has over 123 of the store's own sets that have yet to be sold – with more coming from customers who are down on their luck. Ashley decides to cancel the TV order behind Les' back, never mind that Les will eventually find out when he calls the seller.
135	13	"New Blood"	April 15, 2014
Les takes in a delivery of stainless steel jewelry that he purchased in lieu of the televisions that Ashley cancelled in the previous episode. However, Ashley though that the jewelry is so ridiculous, that she did not want anything to do with it. In response, Les grants her wish – by hiring his niece, Karen, to work with Ashley as assistant jewelry manager.
136	14	"Meet the New Girl"	May 28, 2014
On her first day at American Jewelry, Karen was assigned to the stainless steel jewelry section; however, Ashley is still worried that Karen would upstage her, while Karen worries that Ashley would create bad blood. This situation would later be put to a test when two young men, looking for cheap jewelry, began to become angry when Ashley focused on the expensive gold jewelry, only for Karen to point them towards the stainless steel jewelry.
137	15	"Fan Favorites"	May 28, 2014
A look at the Top 20 moments from past episodes of Hardcore Pawn, selected from a poll of viewers.
138	16	"Cousin Competition"	June 4, 2014
Ashley was overcome by an inferiority complex when she thought that Les was favoring Karen more than her, especially when Les decided to trim down on the gold jewelry and increase the stock of stainless steel jewelry, as he felt that gold had fallen in demand while the demand for stainless steel had demand increased. This motivated her to, as a way to win back his favor, buy a bronze bust of Les, which a customer made as a method of arthritis therapy, for $1000 – a price that Seth felt was too high.
139	17	"Gold vs. Gold"	June 11, 2014
Les has made plans to send someone to Los Angeles to sell the shop's scrap gold. However, Seth suggests that arranging the transaction online and having it shipped through a shipping service not only saves money, but also results in higher returns than the former method. Les, convinced that his method is best, wagers $1000 against Seth. However, it would be Ashley that would have the last laugh.
140	18	"Karen vs. Ashley"	June 18, 2014
Ashley becomes jealous of Karen when she finds out that Karen was top jewelry seller at American Jewelry, to a point where Ashley had Karen do chores and busywork to keep her off the sales floor. However, Ashley's dirty tricks anger Les, as it is people like Karen who make the money for the store.
141	19	"Buy, Baby, Buy"	June 25, 2014
A guitar dealer sees Les about selling a Gibson Les Paul Custom electric guitar previously owned by Kiss band member Ace Frehley. While the seller refused to budge from his $8000 price, Les wanted the guitar so badly, to a point where he literally placed his cash on the line.
142	20	"Shakedown"	July 2, 2014
An unscrupulous tow truck driver attempts to tow away vehicles of unsuspecting customers from American Jewelry's parking lot without Les' authorization. Despite Les' warning to him never to return, he comes back anyway, pulling the same stunt on another customer. He would soon find out that tow trucks can be towed away as well.
143	21	"Along Came a Spider"	July 9, 2014
Ashley locks Seth out of his office, as a lesson for keeping his office unlocked when he is not there. When a customer offered Seth a couple of remote-controlled toy tarantula spiders, it gave him an idea on how to "payback" Ashley. After the joke worked, Seth and Ashley pull the joke on another person – Les.
144	22	"Inside Job"	July 16, 2014
Seth discovers that Christina, a pawn window clerk who has been with American Jewelry for several years, had been pawning her own fake jewelry for over top money value, a way to virtually steal money from the store. After she was caught, Les called the police to arrest her, but figuring that an accomplice was working with her, Les decides not to press charges against her – but only if she names her accomplice.
145	23	"The Hot Rod"	July 23, 2014
Les is interested in buying a gold-colored hot rod from a local hot rod collector. However, the collector, who had $120,000 put into it, intended on showing it for display at an upcoming Detroit Autorama, forcing Les to wait until the show.
146	24	"Ashley In Charge"	July 30, 2014
While Les and Seth visit Autorama, in hopes of Les buying the gold hot rod that he fell in love with in the previous episode, Ashley watches the store. However, some of the staffers, especially Karen, felt that she was being a little too strict.
147	25	"Karen In The Middle"	August 6, 2014
Karen overhears Seth chewing out Ashley in his office for having done something he felt was wrong. Playing an unofficial role of "mediator", Karen decided to offer some comforting words to Ashley, while suggesting to Seth that he would be better off offering constructive criticism and give Ashley a say. But while Ashley welcomed Karen as a needed friend, Seth feels that it's no one's business other than between him and Ashley.
148	26	"Million Dollar Deal, Part 1"	August 13, 2014
A couple from Missouri came to American Jewelry to sell a collection of artwork that they acquired at an estate sale. This cache of artwork, from artists like Pablo Picasso, Miró and Vincent van Gogh, was said to value at $1.4 million, but Les said that he could pawn them for $400,000. A check on the given invoices proved that the paperwork was faked, but an examination by an art expert hired by Les proved that the artwork was genuine, with a value of up to $3 million for the entire set.
149	27	"Million Dollar Deal, Part 2"	August 20, 2014
Les and Seth get a second opinion on the paintings from a local art auction house, using a random sample of three pieces. The appraiser found out that the Picasso was an art print, which is not worth anywhere as much as they hoped, but the other two paintings were real. Les would later strike a deal with the couple selling the paintings for $425,000 for the lot, placed in an escrow account, pending further appraisals. However, the store would soon get a phone call from an irate St. Louis art collector, claiming that the paintings the couple had sold to them actually belong to him.

=== Season 9 (2014–15) ===
No. overall	No. in season	Title	Original release date
150	1	"Million Dollar Resolve"	December 29, 2014
151	2	"High Roller"	January 14, 2015
152	3	"The Drag Race"	January 21, 2015
153	4	"Lights, Camera, Drama!"	January 28, 2015
154	5	"Karen's Big Idea"	February 9, 2015
155	6	"The Estate Sale"	February 16, 2015
156	7	"Professor Les"	February 23, 2015
157	8	"War on the Floor!"	March 2, 2015
158	9	"Secret Shopper"	March 9, 2015
159	10	"Cousin vs. Cousin"	March 16, 2015
160	11	"Seth's Big Mistake"	March 23, 2015
161	12	"Three Ring Circus Part 1"	March 30, 2015
162	13	"Three Ring Circus Part 2"	April 6, 2015
