= White van =

White van may refer to:

- White van man, a stereotypical tradesman in the United Kingdom.
- White van speaker scam, a confidence trick involving the sale of poor quality goods.
- White vans, the vehicles used in enforced disappearances in Sri Lanka.

== See also ==
- Damn Daniel, a 2016 viral video that features the phrase "back at it again with the white Vans!"
