= Shiny Brite =

American Christmas tree ornament-producing company

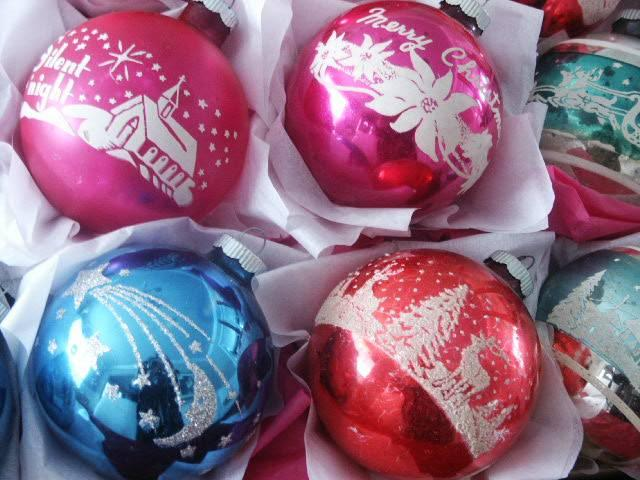
Glass baubles from the Shiny Brite company

The Shiny Brite company produced the most popular Christmas tree ornaments in the United States throughout the 1940s and 1950s.

In 1937, Max Eckardt established Shiny Brite ornaments, working with the Corning Glass company to mass-produce glass Christmas ornaments. Eckardt had been importing hand-blown glass balls from Germany since around 1907, but had the foresight to anticipate a disruption in his supply from the upcoming war. Corning adapted their process for making light bulbs to making clear glass ornaments, which were then shipped to Eckardt's factories to be decorated by hand. During World War II, their basis in America was stressed as a selling point.

Dating of the ornaments is often facilitated by studying the hook. The first Shiny Brite ornaments had the traditional metal cap and loop, with the hook attached to the loop, from which the ornament was hung from the tree.

Wartime production necessitated the replacement of the metal cap with a cardboard tab, from which the owner would use yarn or string to hang the ornament. These hangers firmly place the date of manufacture of the ornament to the early 1940s.

Following the war, Shiny Brite introduced a line of ornaments with a newly designed metal hook that provided the user with two lengths of hanger. The long hook traveled through the center of the ornament and exited the bottom, where it attached to the foot of the ornament. This provided the "short" hanger. Unlatched from the bottom, the entire length of the hook was available, allowing the ornament to dangle at a greater distance from the tree limb to which it was attached. This arrangement was designed to allow the ornament to fill sparsely limbed areas of a natural tree.

The increasing popularity of the aluminum artificial Christmas tree, first manufactured in 1958, made this device far less attractive to the consumer, as an artificial tree had no gaps to be filled. The added expense of the lengthy hanging wire, coupled with the diminishing need, caused this feature to be discontinued in 1960.

Shiny Brite ornaments were first manufactured at Corning's plant in Wellsboro, Pennsylvania, and continued there for many decades. During its peak, Shiny Brite also had factories in New Jersey, located in the cities of Hoboken, Irvington, North Bergen, and West New York. The company's main office and showroom were located at 45 East 17th Street in New York City.

Shiny Brite's most popular ornaments have been reissued under the same trademark by Christopher Radko since 2001.
