= Les Gold =

American pawnbroker, reality TV star, author, and media personality

- Born: Leslie Gold; June 20, 1950 (age 76); Detroit, Michigan, U.S.
- Occupations: Pawnbroker; reality television star; author; speaker
- Years active: 1962–present
- Television: Hardcore Pawn
- Spouse: Lili Gold (m. 1975)
- Children: 2
- Website: pawndetroit.com

Leslie "Les" Gold (born June 20, 1950) is an American pawnbroker, reality television star, author, and media personality. He is known for his role on truTV's reality series, Hardcore Pawn.

== Early life and career ==
Gold is a third generation pawnbroker/salesman, the grandson of a pawnbroker who once owned the company "Sam's Loans", a now-defunct pawnshop on Michigan Avenue in Detroit, Michigan. Sam's Loans was where Gold made his first sale, at age 7. In 2014, the Sam's Loans building was remodeled into a pawn shop-themed restaurant, named "Gold Cash Gold". The restaurant closed in 2020.

Gold began his first business at age 12, buying pizzas and reselling them by the slice to fellow students at Hebrew School. Gold opened his own pawn shop, American Jewelry and Loan, in 1978, at the Green Eight Shopping Center on 8 Mile Road in Oak Park. In 1993, he moved it to its present location on Greenfield Road in Detroit near 8 Mile - a 50,000 square foot building that was formerly a bowling alley. The business now has 5 locations, employs up to 200 people and serves about 1,000 customers a day.

== Hardcore Pawn ==
Gold, his family, and his pawn shops are central to the truTV series Hardcore Pawn.

In 1998, independent producer Richard Dominick saw Gold's TV ads which ran during the local commercial breaks of The Jerry Springer Show, which Dominick was working on at the time. He saw potential in Les and his business as a reality TV show and approached the Gold family with this idea. Les's son, Seth, was initially reluctant, but Les overruled him and agreed to let the cameras in. The pilot aired in late 2009. Dominick was the series co-executive producer with Mike Gamson. Les and Seth Gold were also credited as executive producers, beginning with the third season.

The series premiere (August 16, 2010) attracted two million viewers, thus setting a record as truTV's most-watched premiere. As of June 2013, the viewership exceeded 3 million.

Production was halted and the show was canceled in 2015.

== Publications ==
Gold's autobiography, For What It's Worth: Business Wisdom from a Pawnbroker, was published on June 1, 2013, by Penguin/Portfolio. The book deals with his personal experience in establishing a successful pawn shop, and gives details on how he did it, and how anyone in any field can "think like a pawnbroker". Writing for Forbes, fellow entrepreneur Josh Linkner explains how he has learned from Gold's advice.

The book ranked #4 on The New York Times Best Seller list in the Advice, How-to, and Miscellaneous category for the week of June 30, 2013, and #8 in the Hardcover Business Books category for the month of July 2013.

Gold, the book, and his "three simple steps to successful negotiation" were featured on ABC's Good Morning America on June 18, 2013.

== Personal life ==
Gold has been married to Lili Gold since 1975. Together they have two children, Ashley and Seth, who were featured pawnbrokers on Gold's reality show.

== Philanthropy ==
Gold supports The Heat And Warmth Fund ("THAW Fund"), which helps local families pay their heat and electricity bills. In February 2013, a fund-raising party dubbed "Hardcore THAW" was held after-hours in his store and raised more than $40,000 for the organization.
