= Hardcore Pawn =

American reality television series (2010–2015)

Coordinates: 42°26′37″N 83°11′58″W

- Starring: Les Gold; Seth Gold; Ashley Broad; Bobby Janiec; Karen Mitchell
- Country of origin: United States
- Original language: English
- No. of seasons: 9
- No. of episodes: 162 (list of episodes)

Production
- Running time: 30 minutes
- Production companies: RDF USA / Zodiak USA; Richard Dominick Productions

Original release
- Network: truTV
- Release: August 16, 2010 – April 6, 2015

Related
- Hardcore Pawn: Chicago

Hardcore Pawn is an American reality television series produced by RDF USA (later Zodiak Media) and Richard Dominick Productions for truTV about the day-to-day operations of American Jewelry and Loan, a family-owned and -operated pawn shop and broker on Detroit’s 8 Mile Road corridor.

The series premiered on August 16, 2010, delivering two million viewers, setting a record as truTV's most-watched series premiere ever. Production was halted and the show was canceled in 2014.

== Overview ==
American Jewelry and Loan is owned by Les Gold, a third-generation pawnbroker and businessman, and the grandson of a pawnbroker who once owned Sam's Loans, a now-defunct pawnshop on Michigan Avenue in Detroit. Les first opened American Jewelry at the Green Eight Shopping Center on 8 Mile Road in Oak Park in 1978, moving to its present location in 1993.

In 2011, American Jewelry expanded to its second location when it acquired Premier Jewelry and Loan in Pontiac; (Note: Name of pawn shop acquired revealed in the episode "Aftermath", with its address matched between American Jewelry's website and Premiere Jewelry's Yelp listing.) the new location was featured in the first few episodes of Hardcore Pawn's fifth season, and in two episodes of the sixth season, where Les's son and co-owner/employee Seth attempts to sell the Pontiac location behind Les's back.

Les' only son, Seth, is an alumnus of the University of Michigan and has been a co-owner of American Jewelry since graduating from school. Seth handles the store's marketing division and claims that if it was not for him, the shop's only marketing campaign would be "an ad in the Yellow Pages". Les's daughter, Ashley, has a bachelor's degree in business administration from Michigan State University and earned her graduate diamond certification from the Gemological Institute of America. Ashley is a co-owner of American Jewelry and has been working there for more than fifteen years, although she took three years off at one point for maternity leave. The sibling rivalry between her and Seth is a common element of many episodes.

== Episodes ==
Season	Episodes	Originally aired	
Season	Episodes	First aired	Last aired
Pilot episodes	2	December 21, 2009	
1	8	August 16, 2010	September 27, 2010
2	8	December 28, 2010	February 8, 2011
3	13	February 15, 2011	May 24, 2011
4	13	June 21, 2011	October 4, 2011
5	26	November 15, 2011	June 19, 2012
6	26	July 10, 2012	February 5, 2013
7	26	March 26, 2013	November 5, 2013
8	27	December 17, 2013	August 20, 2014
9	13	December 29, 2014	April 6, 2015

== Cast ==
- Leslie "Les" Gold, owner
- Seth Gold, Les' son, co-owner
- Ashley Gold Broad, Les' daughter, co-owner, head of Jewelry department. Left the pawn shop after series concluded to start her own online jewelry business
- Lili Gold, Les' wife and office manager. Appears occasionally in the background during the first season, but is never seen or mentioned thereafter
- Karen Mitchell, Les' niece, co-manager of the jewelry department (seasons 8–9)
- Bobby Janiec ("Bobby J"), store employee. Left the pawn shop early in 2016, and has since posted in various social media accounts that he feels he was taken advantage of by the owner, Les Gold.
- Byron, security (season 6 then became head of security in episode 1 of season 7 after Joe was caught stealing)
- Hook, security (seasons 1–9)
- Joe, also known as "Big Joe", head of security (seasons 1–6); arrested, then fired for getting caught on camera stealing scrap gold. The incident aired on season six finale.
- Felix, security (seasons 1–6). Known for long thick beard. Left for unknown reasons. Departure not addressed on show
- Rich Pyle, store manager (seasons 1–6). Store manager for 25 years. Plays in a rock band on the side. Was sent home by Les in a controversial episode for an apparently minor dispute. He returned to the store the next day and apologized, but he was eventually written out of the show and left the pawn shop altogether.
- Robo, head of security (season 1). In the series premiere, he was the long-time head of security. However, he was sent home for inappropriately biting an employee. While he was brought back after his temporary suspension, he is only seen a couple more times for the rest of season 1, and is not seen again from season 2 onwards.
- Jeff, jewelry technician. Responsible for setting diamonds, melting gold, etc. It was from his desk that former security guard Joe was caught stealing.
- Nikki, Amber, Christina; window clerks. Christina was caught stealing and arrested in a season 8 episode.
- Darren McCarty, former National Hockey League hockey player for Detroit Red Wings who appeared on the show initially to sell taxidermy animals but wound up being offered a job as an entry-level pawnbroker. Initially makes the mistake of overpaying for a couple of Red Wing jerseys but makes up for it by signing them, thereby increasing their value.

== Series cancellation ==
During season 9, truTV decided not to order more episodes because of the network's new direction. truTV was concentrating on comedy programming and it was decided that Hardcore Pawn did not relate properly to other programs in the network's schedule. No other television networks showed interest in the series, and production was halted in 2014.

== Reception ==
=== Ratings response ===
The show averaged 2.6 million viewers during its sixth season.

=== Comparison to Pawn Stars ===
The show has been largely compared to similar reality program Pawn Stars on History, but in the vein of similar programs also on truTV (Operation Repo and Lizard Lick Towing for example), where it differs however is the focus being mainly on the human aspects of drama and interaction, rather than the actual significance of the items being brought into the shop.

Due to similarities to Pawn Stars, Hardcore Pawn has been described as simply being a knock-off and a capitalization on the breakout success of Pawn Stars. Les defends the show with claims that his show is a true representation of what a pawn shop does, focusing on the human element and showing that people are suffering tough times and need money for basic necessities like food and rent.

According to Marc Juris of truTV, any similarities between the shows are coincidental. He also noted that Hardcore Pawn was in development for more than a year and two test episodes aired in December 2009. Regarding the initial identical time slot of Monday nights at 10 pm ET, opposite Pawn Stars at the time, Juris claimed the choice was made because Hardcore Pawn fit well with Operation Repo. The second season debuted in December 2010, in the Tuesday at 9 pm ET timeslot.

=== Reality versus scripting ===
The first season put an emphasis on the sad stories of people pawning their possessions and on the Golds' need to arm and otherwise protect themselves in dangerous Detroit. This was deemed too dark for television, and from the second season all mention of danger was dropped, and pawn stories downplayed in favor of people selling unusual things and Les bargaining them down in price. Owner Les said at the launch of the show that there would be no staged antics, products or characters on the show. However, New York Post writer Linda Stasi has opined that some situations in Hardcore Pawn are set up. Big Daddy, who was on a never-aired episode back in 2011, confirms that, although his particular segment was lightly coached and completely unscripted, he did observe at least one other guest directed in what he should say and do.

== Spin-offs ==
Hardcore Pawn has generated two spin-offs:

- Combat Pawn, a series about the employees and customers at Guns Plus, a gun shop located near the Fort Bragg military installation in North Carolina. Originally developed under the title Hardcore Pawn: Fort Bragg, Combat Pawn debuted on truTV on Sunday, July 15, 2012, at 10:30 p.m. ET/PT.
- Hardcore Pawn: Chicago, which features Chicago's Royal Pawn Shop, a pawn shop owned by two brothers, Randy and Wayne Cohen, whose family has been in the business for over 100 years. The series debuted January 1, 2013 and is produced for truTV by Bischoff Hervey Entertainment, with Eric Bischoff and Jason Hervey as executive producers.

In addition, Rich Pyle, one of the American Jewelry clerks who was featured in many episodes of Hardcore Pawn, has since left the show and became host of another television series for the National Geographic channel, Meltdown, a series focusing on the recycling of precious metals. That series debuted on National Geographic on October 31, 2013.

== See also ==
- Pawn Queens
