= Pawn Queens =

US television program

- Directed by: Bryan Stratte
- Starring: Minda Grabiec; Nikki Ruehl; Greg Holloway; Tom Brunzelle
- No. of seasons: 1
- No. of episodes: 10

Production
- Executive producer: Varuna Entertainment
- Producers: Ali Bazzy; Jason Morgan; Rob Zazzli
- Running time: 22–24 minutes

Original release
- Network: TLC
- Release: November 18, 2010 – May 25, 2011

Pawn Queens is a reality TV series about female pawn shop operators, airing on TLC, which premiered in 2010, following its pilot episode in 2010.

== Premise ==
Located in the Chicago suburb of Naperville, Illinois, businesswomen Minda Grabiec and Nikki Ruehl run a pawn shop that caters to women. The family-friendly boutique specializes in merchandise appealing to women, including jewelry, vintage Barbie dolls, and one-of-a-kind antiques. With their two business partners, Greg Holloway and Tom Brunzelle, they pawn, purchase, and sell just about anything to keep their fledgling company afloat. Each episode focuses on how pawn businesses operate, and features Minda and Nikki struggling to debunk the stereotype that the pawn business is only for men, although in reality pawn shops have long been regarded as a common occupation and service for women, and are often family businesses.

The store was started by Holloway and Brunzelle in 2009. The pair decided to try to attract female customers, and recruited Grabiec and Ruehl, who invested in, and are partners in the business.

== Cast ==
- Minda Grabiec
- Nikki Ruehl
- Greg Holloway
- Tom Brunzelle

== Development ==
According to the show's producer, Jason Morgan, while in town for his 20-year high school reunion, he dropped by Naperville Jewelry & Loan upon hearing that the store dealt in high-end items. An assistant had coincidentally found the shop while researching unusual pawn shops. This led to the shooting of the pilot episode, through August 2010.

== Reception ==
Media Life Magazine described the interaction among the partners in the 2010 pilot episode as "pleasant enough," but referred to the show as having "no pay off", since no merchandise is seen being pawned, only purchased by the shop, and no ultimate sales of merchandise is seen. The Hollywood Reporter gave a mixed review of the 2011 series premiere, stating, "Pawn Queens makes you wonder whether some professions are simply not worthy of their own show," and called the series "not-so-dramatic" and "G-rated pawning, which makes you hungry for Vegas."

=== Ratings ===
The premiere episode which aired on November 18, 2010 achieved 1.2 million viewers, prompting the TLC network to give the show its own series, which first aired May 5, 2011. The show had more than one million viewers each week.

== Episodes ==
| No. | Title | Original release date |
|---|---|---|
| 1 | "Golden Barbie" | November 18, 2010 |
A Barbie doll purchase causes a dash to a gold dealer, an illuminated wedding dress arrives, and a vintage stove grabs Tom's attention.
| 2 | "Diamonds Go Missing" | November 18, 2010 |
A customer's pawned ring is lost, causing an intense search.
| 3 | "Bring on the Knight" | May 5, 2011 |
A suit of armor, a nurses's costume, and a magician's magic box.
| 4 | "Supply and Demand" | May 5, 2011 |
An auction to raise money for taxes
| 5 | "Price of Business" | May 12, 2011 |
Gold jewelry turns out to be stolen goods. Tom fixes a pedal car.
| 6 | "Supply and Demand" | May 12, 2011 |
An old refrigerator, and an office party
| 7 | "Looming Deadline" | May 18, 2011 |
The daily police inventory report causes ongoing strife.
| 8 | "House Divided" | May 18, 2011 |
Remodeling becomes a controversy, a classic Mustang tempts Minda, and an electric guitar.
| 9 | "Marketing Madness" | May 25, 2011 |
Store marketing plans threaten finances.
| 10 | "You Break It, You Buy It" | May 25, 2011 |
A wedding kimono looks highly valuable, and a broken guitar creates problems.

== See also ==
- Beverly Hills Pawn – a reality television program based in a pawn shop in Beverly Hills
- Hardcore Pawn – a reality television program based in a pawn shop in Detroit
- Pawn Stars – a reality television program based in a pawn shop in Las Vegas
