= Rocking horse =

Child's toy

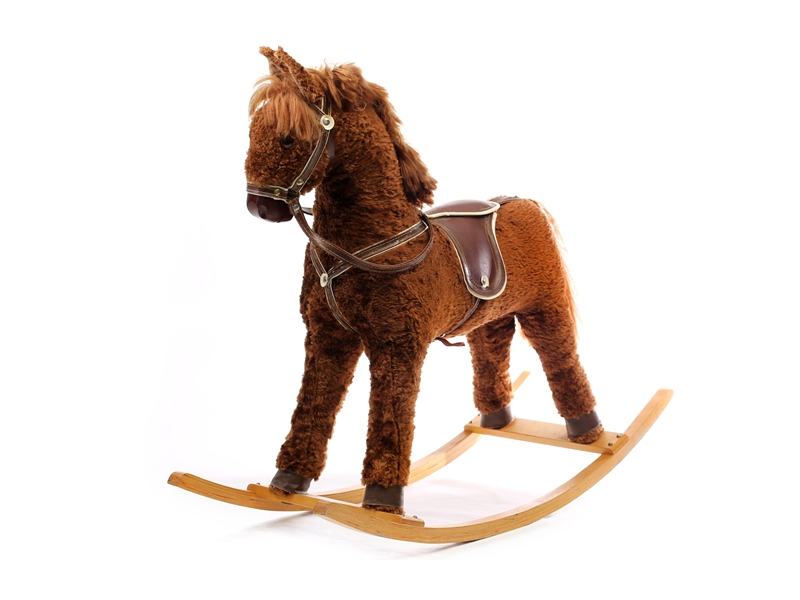
A rocking horse in the collection of The Children's Museum of Indianapolis

A rocking horse is a child's toy, usually shaped like a horse and mounted on rockers similar to a rocking chair. There are two sorts, the one where the horse part sits rigidly attached to a pair of curved rockers that are in contact with the ground, and a second sort, where the horse hangs on a rigid frame by iron straps. The horse moves only relative to the frame, which does not move.

Predecessors of the rocking horse may be seen in the tilting seats used during the Middle Ages for jousting practice as well as the wheeled hobby horse. The toy in its current form did not appear before the 17th century, though some conflicting sources note medieval manuscripts including references to carved rocking horses, presumably of the toy kind.

From the 19th century onward, rocking horses became more commonly considered as child's toy. Mostly built by hobby woodcrafters, and ranging from relatively crude to finely ornamented and the toys of future kings, it was not until the late 19th century that the production became industrialised.

In 2006, the Guinness Book of World Records certified Katlinel and Les Hartness of California as having the largest hand-carved wooden rocking horse on record. This rocking horse was built in 2000 and is 7 feet 8 inches (234 cm) tall and weighs 1,200 pounds (680 kg). It can be seen at renaissance faires, faerie festivals, and at private parties and events where up to 3 adults or 4-5 children can ride it together at one time. According to Les and Katlinel, the youngest rider has been six weeks old and the oldest, 94 years.

== Gallery ==
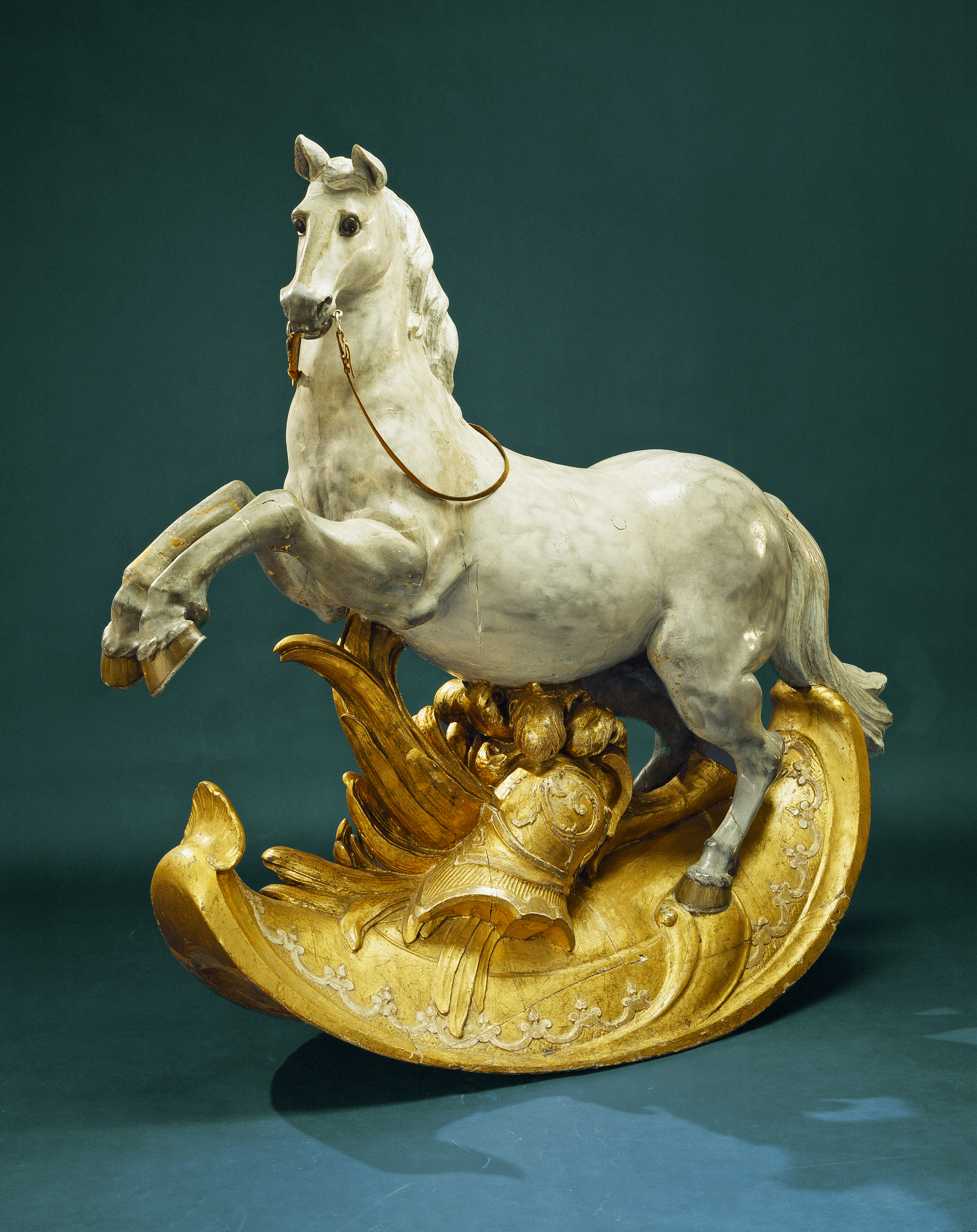
Wood-sculpted rocking horse on gilded stand, possibly belonging to King Gustav III of Sweden as a child

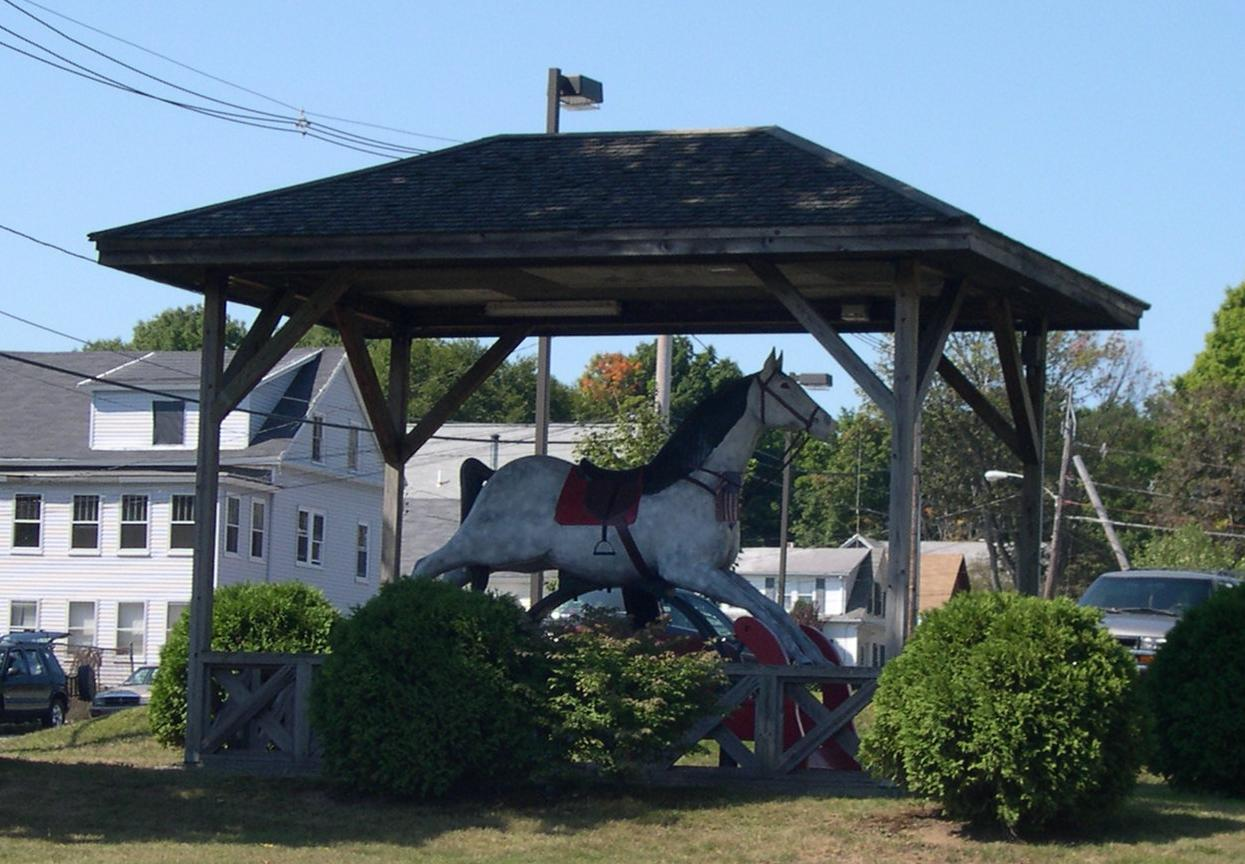
Statue of a rocking horse in Winchendon, Massachusetts, USA

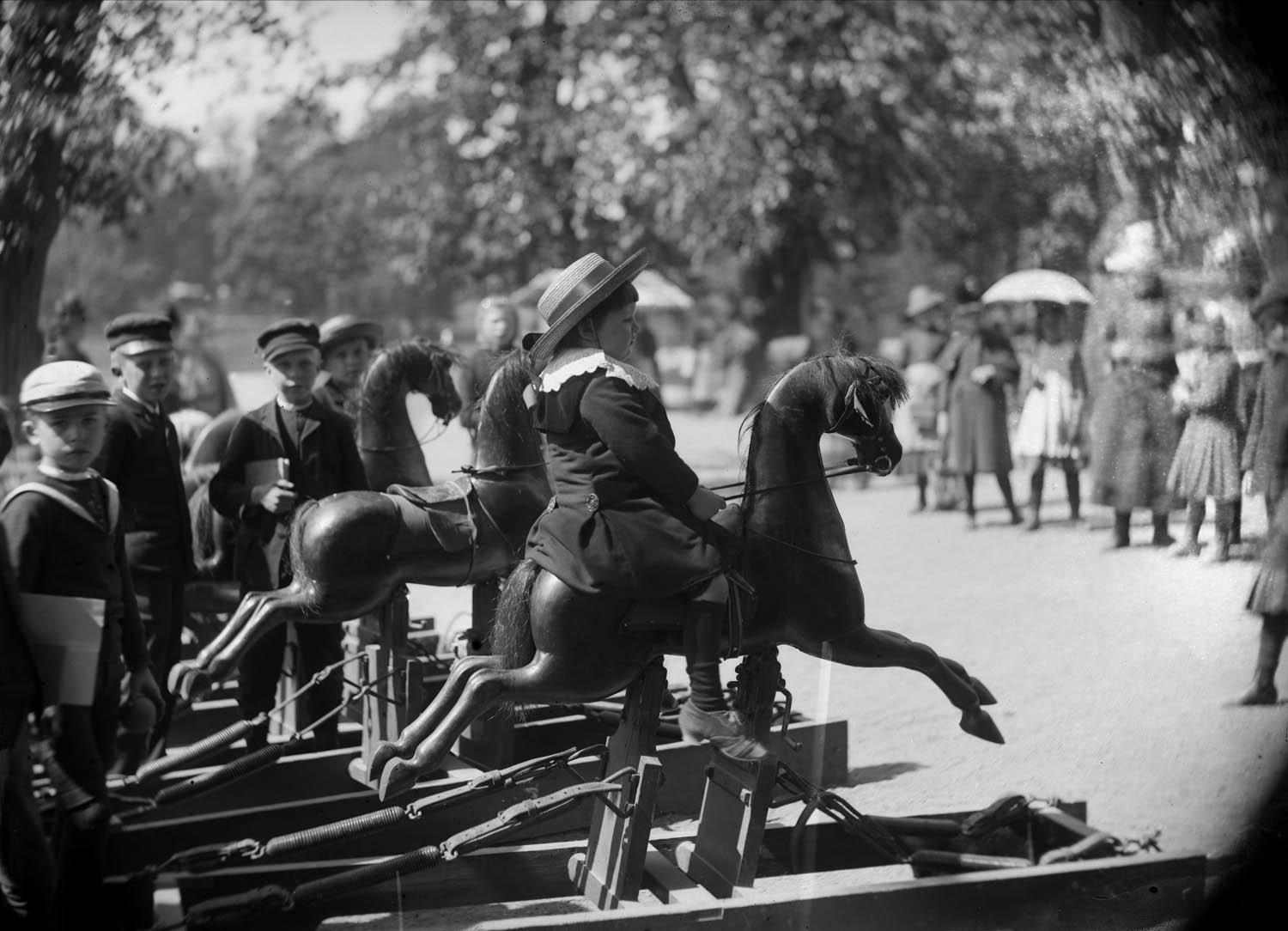
Boy riding a mechanical rocking horse in 1880s Stockholm

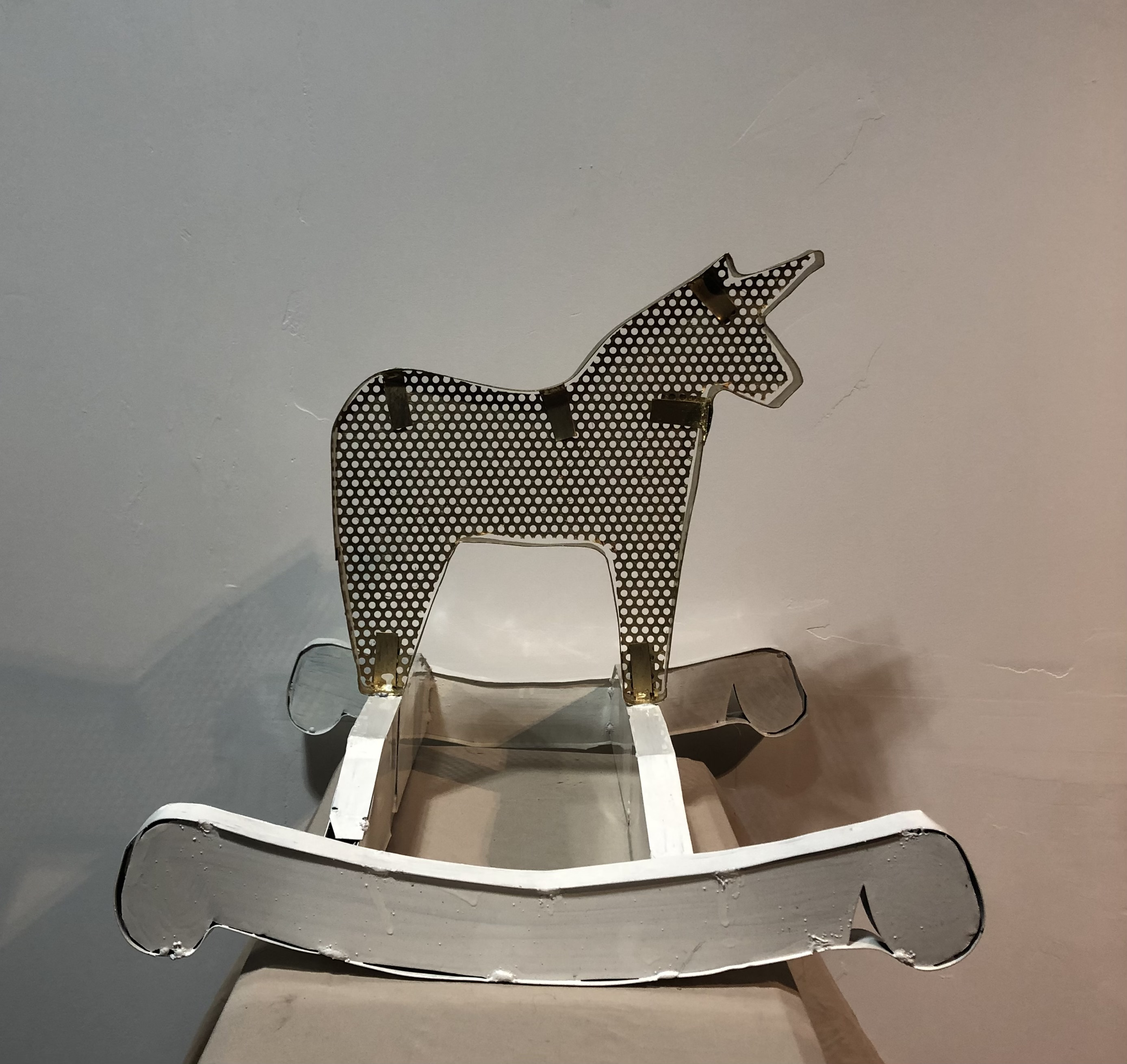
Dala Häst Hobby Rawkr

== See also ==
- Big Rocking Horse
- Hobby horse
- Spring rider
