= Fairy festival =

A Fairy Festival, Faery Festival, or Fairy Fayre is an outdoor gathering typically including costuming, handicrafts, music or other entertainment, and food. Fairy Festivals are sometimes considered a form of Renaissance fair, although they lack historical basis and the depiction of fairies is generally based on Victorian Romanticism rather than historical lore.

== Notable events ==
- 3 Wishes Fairy Festival in Cornwall

- Avalon Faery Fayre in Glastonbury
- The Fairy And Human Relations Congress in

Washington state

- Feenfest in Saalfeld, Germany
