= Christopher Radko =

American businessman

- Education: Columbia University (BA)
- Occupations: Designer, businessman
- Known for: Founding the eponymous Christmas ornaments brand

Christopher Radko is an American businessman and designer known for starting the eponymous Christmas ornaments business. He is called the "Czar of the Christmas Present" by The New York Times and the "Ornament King'' by the Chicago Tribune.

== Biography ==
Radko grew up in Scarsdale, New York, the son of two doctors. He skipped his senior year of high school and started college at 16. He graduated from Columbia University in 1981.

Out of college, Radko first worked as a mailroom clerk at ICM Partners. In 1984, his family's 14-foot Christmas tree crashed to the ground, taking his family's heirloom of 2,000 exquisite, mouth-blown European glass ornaments with it. Unable to find replacements of the ornaments, Radko started his own ornaments business and sourced the ornaments from Polish craftsmen that he met on a trip. He sold $25,000 worth of ornaments during his first year by visiting door-to-door to Manhattan retailers on his lunch hour. His earliest customers included celebrities such as Katharine Hepburn, Woody Allen, Mikhail Baryshnikov, Whoopi Goldberg and Bruce Springsteen, and he was invited to design mantel displays for the White House and to decorate the Vice President Al Gore's residence. By 1997, Radko saw his company sales totaling $50 million.

He sold his business to Rauch Industries in 2005. In 2022, he won a legal challenge against Rauch Industries to use his name for his new line of original ornaments. He originally signed a non-competition agreement with Rauch that expired as of August 15, 2021, but the company filed a motion to prohibit Radko from using his name in association with his new company.

Radko is of Polish descent. He lives in Westchester County, New York.
