= White van speaker scam =

Scam passing off cheap goods as premium

The white van speaker scam is a scam sales technique in which a con artist makes a buyer believe they are getting a good price on home entertainment products. Often a con artist will buy inexpensive, generic speakers and convince potential buyers that they are premium products worth hundreds or thousands of dollars, offering them for sale at a price that the buyer thinks is heavily discounted, but is actually a heavy markup from their real value. Con artists in this type of scam call themselves "speakerguys" or "speakermen", and usually claim to be working for a speaker delivery or installation company.

The speaker scam was common in the 1980s. Despite widespread information about the scam on consumer forums and watchdog sites, the scams continue operating across several continents.

== Process ==
The typical white van speaker scam involves one to three individuals, who are usually casually dressed or wearing uniforms. They drive an SUV, minivan or a commercial vehicle (usually a white commercial van, which may be rented inexpensively) that often displays a company logo. To find suitable targets, the van operators set up their con in moderately trafficked areas, such as parking lots, gas stations, colleges, or large apartment complexes. Alternatively, they may target people driving expensive cars and wave them down. The marks (victims) are usually affluent, young people, college students, or others thought to have large amounts of disposable income. The marks may also be foreigners or people who are unfamiliar with typical business transactions in Western countries.

The operators often claim that they work for an audio retailer or audio installer and that, through some sort of corporate error (warehouse operator mistake, bookkeeping mistakes, computer glitch, etc.) or due to the client changing the order after supplies were purchased, they have extra speakers. Sometimes, it is implied that the merchandise may be stolen. For varying reasons they need to dispose of the speakers quickly and are willing to get rid of them at "well below retail" prices. The con artists will repeatedly state the speaker's "value" as anywhere between the equivalent of $1800 and $3500, prices often purportedly verified by showing a website, brochure or a magazine advertisement. Speakers are often given a fictional brand name, sometimes intentionally similar to a well-regarded speaker manufacturer in order to mislead the buyer. Some of these fictional brands have reputable-looking websites which list customer service telephone numbers and support e-mail addresses, but these methods of contact are often dead ends.

If the mark declines the offer, the scammer uses various high-pressure negotiation sales tactics. Among these techniques are producing glossy material that details the quality and high retail value of the speakers, and bombarding the potential customer with technical jargon, whether correctly or incorrectly used. If still unable to convince the mark that he or she would be turning down an incredible offer, the con artist will almost always lower the price significantly.

The quality can vary greatly from unusable or non-working to barely acceptable, but overall, the quality of the product is inferior to name-brand speakers of a similar price and size. White van speakers are often partially filled with concrete or rocks to increase their weight and create the illusion of high quality. Another common characteristic of white van speakers is an unusually high wattage rating for their size, for example 1000 watts for a 3-inch speaker, which in reality may be rated as low as five watts. In some cases when a buyer tries to hook up the home theatre system to a high-definition television set, they find that it cannot be done, and the claim of HD compatibility made for the white van system is just another element of the scam. Systems (typically amplifiers with speakers, sold as sets) with only two or three inputs and a lack of video inputs, with only analogue L/R/6ch RCA jacks, are common in this scheme. In some cases, the amplifier will not be included, even though the information on the packaging implies that it is.
