= List of Wheaton College (Massachusetts) alumni =

The following is a categorized list of alumni, as well as honorary degree recipients, of Wheaton College in Massachusetts.

== Alumni ==
=== Academia ===
- Elizabeth Altmaier (1973), Professor of Counseling Psychology and Community and Behavioral Health, University of Iowa
- Mary Ellen Avery (1948), Thomas Morgan Rotch Professor of Pediatrics, Harvard Medical School
- Joan Copjec (1968), Professor of Modern Culture and Media, Brown University
- Faye Crosby (1969), Professor of Psychology, University of California, Santa Cruz
- Lydia Folger Fowler (1842), first female medical professor in the United States at the Rochester Eclectic Medical College
- Caroline Haven Ober (1884), founder of the Department of Romance Languages, University of Washington
- Patricia A. King (1964), Carmack Waterhouse Professor of Law, Medicine, Ethics, and Public Policy, Georgetown University
- E. Frances White (1971), Professor of Individualized Study and Social and Cultural Analysis, New York University

=== Arts ===
- Carolyn Brown (1950), choreographer
- Nick Fradiani (2008), winner of the fourteenth season of American Idol
- Nancy Hemenway Barton (1941), artist
- Mary Fickett, actress
- Lauren Henderson (2009), singer
- Catherine Keener (1983), Academy Award-nominated actress
- Molly Luce (1916), painter
- Bruce Marks (1986), director of the Boston Ballet
- Eleanor Norcross (1872), painter and founder of the Fitchburg Art Museum
- Anne-Imelda Radice (1969), art historian
- Ann Ronell (1923), composer
- Jessica Sonneborn, actress
- Callie Thorne (1991), actress
- Clenet Verdi-Rose (2004), film director
- Rose Weaver (1973), actress

=== Athletics ===
- Dan Antoniuk (2003), Major Arena Soccer League player
- Connie Carberg (1971–1972), National Football League scout
- Chris Denorfia (2002), Major League Baseball player
- Jim Manganello (1999), Major League Soccer player

=== Business ===
- Ken Babby (2002), businessman
- Ligia Bonetti (1989), businesswoman
- Evelyn Danzig Haas (1939), philanthropist
- Diane Farrell (1977), board member of the Export–Import Bank of the United States
- Janet Hanson, founder of Ellevate Network
- Denise Jefferson (1965), dancer
- Trish Karter (1977), founder of Dancing Deer Baking Co.
- Sandra Ohrn Moose (1963), advisor to the Boston Consulting Group
- Patricia Phelps de Cisneros (1969), philanthropist
- Catherine Filene Shouse (1918), philanthropist

=== Literature ===
- Lori Baker (1984), novelist
- Lesley Bannatyne (1975), author
- Linda Barlow (1970), author
- Gwenda Blair (1960–1961), author
- Harriet Connor Brown, author
- Kay Chorao (1958), children's writer
- Jean Fritz (1937), children's writer
- Robie Harris (1962), children's writer
- Allen J. Hubin, literary critic
- Peter W. Kunhardt Jr. (2005), author
- Nancy Mairs (1964), essayist
- Susan Meddaugh (1966), children's writer
- Estelle M. H. Merrill (1877), journalist
- Marion Naifeh (1950), author
- Esther Newberg (1963), literary agent
- Margaret Colby Getchell Parsons (1914), author
- Jean Pedrick (1943), author
- Sally Bedell Smith (1970), journalist
- Lesley Stahl (1963), journalist
- Mari Tomasi, novelist
- Amanda Urban (1968), literary agent

=== Politics ===
- Mimi Alford (1965), White House intern, who had an affair with United States President John F. Kennedy
- Gabe Amo (2010), member of the U.S. House of Representatives from Rhode Island
- Anne Canby, Commissioner of the New Jersey Department of Transportation
- Giovinella Gonthier (1972), Seychelles Ambassador to the United States
- Shad Al-Sherif Pasha (2001), Sharif of Hijaz
- Ellen Moran (1988), former White House Communications Director under United States President Barack Obama
- Barbara Richardson (1971), First Lady of New Mexico and wife of Bill Richardson
- Gale Rossides, acting director of the Transportation Security Administration
- Margaret Joy Tibbetts (1941), United States Ambassador to Norway
- Candy Waites (1965), member of the South Carolina House of Representatives
- Jigme Khesar Namgyel Wangchuck (1999–2001), King of Bhutan
- Christine Todd Whitman (1968), Governor of New Jersey

=== Religion ===
- Sarah B. Capron (1824-1918), evangelical missionary
- Emily Susan Hartwell (1883), missionary
- Nedi Rivera (1968), Episcopal bishop

=== Other ===
- Louise Bates Ames (1926–1928), psychologist
- Mark Baumer (2006), adventurer
- Ron Corning (1993), television news reporter
- Barbara Damrosch (1963), horticulturalist
- Dennis Leary, chef
- Mary Johnson Bailey Lincoln (1864), chef
- Fanny E. Minot (1867), president of the Woman's Relief Corps
- Ann Peoples (1979), anthropologist
- Sybil Ward, attorney

== Honorary ==
- Hattie Alexander (1967), pediatrician
- Lawrence S. Bacow (2024), former president of Harvard University and Tufts University
- Margaret Clapp (1960), president of Wellesley College
- Ruth Bader Ginsburg (1997), associate justice, US Supreme Court
- Emerson Greenaway (1973), president of the American Library Association
- Vartan Gregorian (1989), president of the Carnegie Corporation of New York
- Matina Horner (1979), president of Radcliffe College
- Alice S. Huang (1982), president of the American Association for the Advancement of Science
- Wolf Kahn (2000), painter
- Phyllis McGinley (1956), children's writer
- Agnes Mongan (1953), director of the Harvard Art Museums
- Seiji Ozawa (1984), director of the Boston Symphony Orchestra
- Helenka Pantaleoni (1966), actress
- Richard Stengel (2011), chief executive officer of the National Constitution Center
- Rosemond Tuve (1957), Professor of English, University of Pennsylvania
- Emily Vermeule (1973), Professor of Classical Philology and Archaeology, Harvard University
- Kathryn Wasserman Davis (2009), philanthropist
