= List of ambassadors of Seychelles to the United States =

Coordinates: 40.749789°N 73.971792°W

Ambassador of Seychelles to United States
- Inaugural holder: Bernard Michel Loustau-Lalanne
- Formation: 16 November 1978

The Seychellense Ambassador in New York City is the official representative of the Government of in Victoria, Seychelles to the Government of the United States. They are Permanent Representative next the Headquarters of the United Nations. Seychelles has no embassy in Washington, DC; its permanent representative to the United Nations in New York has also served as ambassador to the United States.

== List of representatives ==
Diplomatic agreement/designated	Diplomatic accreditation	Ambassador	Observations	List of presidents of Seychelles	List of presidents of the United States	Term end
10 October 1978	16 November 1978	Bernard Michel Loustau-Lalanne	Resident in London as Seychelles High Commissioner also commissioned to Canada, 2 Mill Street, W1R9TE (01-499-9951) (* 20 June 1938 in Mahb.) Son of J. A. M. and Madeleine (née Boulle) Loustau-Lalanne. *Seychelles College, Vic., St. Mary's College, Southampton, Imperial College, London. *1962–1964: Assistant Inspector N. Rhodesia Police, Ndola. *1970–1973: Crown Counsel, Attorney-General's Chambers, Seychelles. *1973-1976Senior State Counsel and Official Notary. *1976–1978 Attorney-General.*1978–1981 High Commissioner in United Kingdom (also Ambassador to United States of America). *1978–1980: Commander Institute Whaling Commission. *1980–1990: Institute Representative Performing Right Society Ltd. since 1991: Secretary-General European Federation of Management Consultancies Associations (FEACO), Brussels.	France-Albert René	Jimmy Carter	
7 June 1983	12 July 1983	Giovinella Gonthier		France-Albert René	Ronald Reagan	
23 June 1993	9 March 1993	Marc Michael Rogers Marengo		France-Albert René	Bill Clinton	
13 March 1998	16 March 1998	Claude Sylvestre Anthony Morel		France-Albert René	Bill Clinton	
20 May 2005	26 May 2005	Jérémie Émile Patrick Bonnelame		James Michel	George W. Bush	
10 September 2007	18 September 2007	Ronald Jean Jumeau		James Michel	George W. Bush	October 2016
9 June 2012	19 September 2012	Marie-Louise Potter	Marie Louis Cecile Potter	James Michel	Barack Obama	October 2016
March 2017	8 September 2017	Ronald Jean Jumeau	Returned to the position for a second term. Accredited to the UN on 3 May 2017	Danny Faure	Donald Trump	
17 June 2021	1 December 2021	Ian Madeleine	Accredited to the UN on 16 September 2021	Wavel Ramkalawan	Joe Biden	
August 1, 2025	16 December 2025	Vivianne Fock Tave	Accredited to the UN on 3 December 2025	Wavel Ramkalawan	Donald Trump	

== See also ==
- United States–Seychelles relations
