= Israel–Seychelles relations =

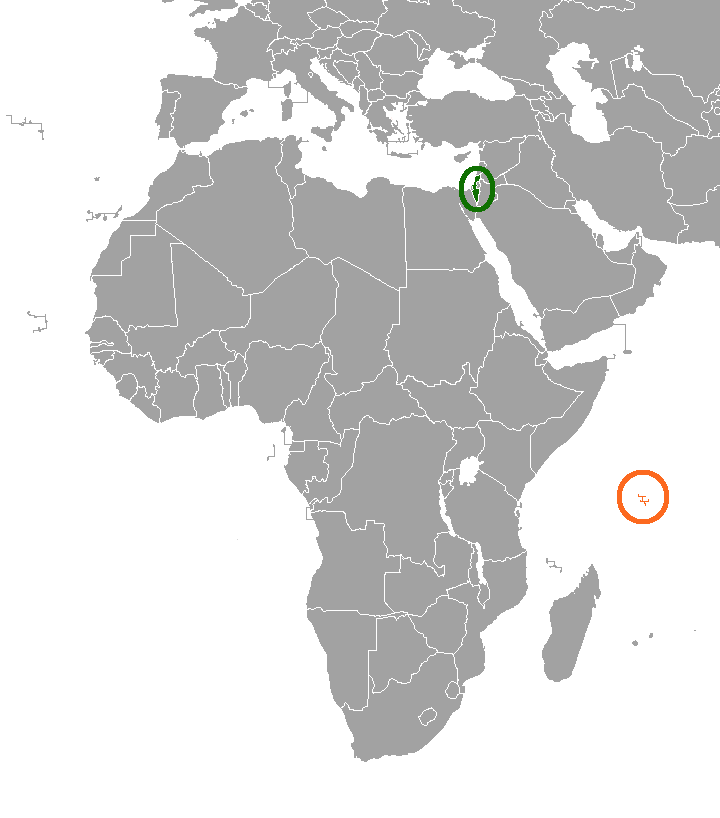

- Israel: Seychelles

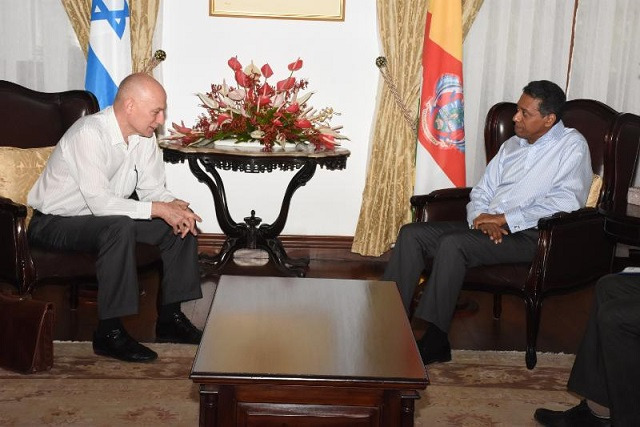
The Israeli ambassador to Seychelles with the president of Seychelles Danny Faure, November 2018.

Israel–Seychelles relations refer to the bilateral relationship between the State of Israel and the Republic of Seychelles. The Israeli embassy in Nairobi, Kenya is accredited to Seychelles. Seychelles has an honorary consul in Tel Aviv, named Arie Goldstein. Seychelles supports a two-state solution and Israel's right to defend itself during the Gaza war.

== History ==
Relations between the State of Israel and the Republic of Seychelles were officially established in 1992, after the end of the boycott of the Sub-Saharan African countries.

The economic relations between Israel and Seychelles are small and modest, with tourism as the most important co-operation between the countries. In 2020, during the COVID-19 pandemic, Seychelles opened the country for Israelis and set aside an island exclusively for them, since during the first wave, Israel had a low rate of infection.

== Diplomatic missions ==
Israel is not represented in Seychelles at either the embassy or consular level, but through the embassy it maintains in Nairobi.

Seychelles is not represented in Israel at embassy level. Seychelles is represented in Israel at a consular level through a consulate it maintains in Tel Aviv. The Honorary Consul of Seychelles in Israel is Aryeh Goldstein.

In January 2024, both countries signed visa-free accord.

== See also ==
- Foreign relations of Israel
- Foreign relations of Seychelles
