= Foochow College =

Former college in Fuzhou, China

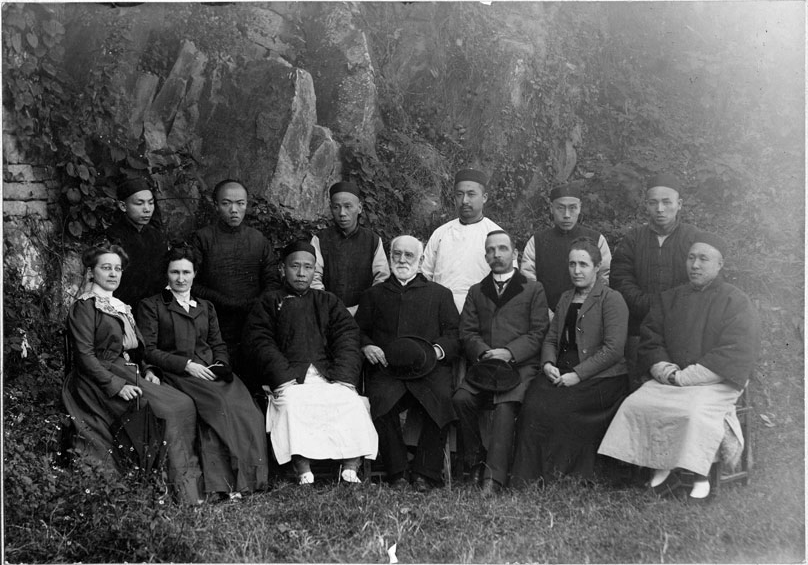
Hartwell with Foochow College faculty

Foochow College was a college in Fuzhou, China. It had a long history in the late nineteenth and early twentieth century with American Christian missionaries who taught there.

It was originally established in 1850 as Ponasung Primary School and changed its name to the Gospel House and then Foochow College; it was run by foreign Christian missionaries until 1927.

Charles Hartwell spent much time at the college. His daughter Emily Susan Hartwell taught English there for 20 years. Willard Livingstone Beard led it from 1912 to 1927.

Having merged other smaller colleges in Fuzhou, it became the main forerunner of Fuzhou No.5 Middle School in 1952, which resumed the former Chinese name of Fuzhou Gezhi High School in 1992.
