= List of people from Scarsdale, New York =

The following is a list of notable people from Scarsdale, New York.

== Arts ==
- Cabot Lyford, sculptor
- Stephanie Stebich, art historian and museum director
- Emmett Watson, illustrator

== Business ==
- Mark Bezos, early Amazon investor and brother of Jeff Bezos
- Lauren Hobart, CEO and chairwoman of Dick's Sporting Goods; board member of Yum! Brands
- Andrew R. Jassy, founder of AWS and CEO of Amazon.com, was raised in Scarsdale
- Eric Mindich, founder of the hedge fund Eton Park Capital Management and the youngest person to ever make partner at Goldman Sachs, was raised in Scarsdale
- Daniel Och, founder of Och-Ziff
- Jon Oringer, founder and CEO of Shutterstock, was raised in Scarsdale
- Christopher Radko, Christmas ornament designer
- David Siegel, founder of Two Sigma
- David Stern, commissioner of National Basketball Association
- Harry Wilson, businessman
- George Zimmer, founder of Men's Wearhouse, was raised in Scarsdale

== Criminals ==
- Joseph DiNapoli, Italian American mobster
- Robert Hanssen, Soviet spy; lived at 150 Webster Road in Scarsdale, 1978–1981; his children attended Immaculate Heart of Mary School
- Benjamin (Bugsy) Siegel, gangster and Las Vegas resort builder; owned a house in Scarsdale from 1929 on; was increasingly absent in later years but his family continued to live there

== Legal ==
- Preet Bharara, lawyer; United States attorney for the Southern District of New York 2009–2017
- William Glendon, lawyer who argued the Pentagon Papers case before the United States Supreme Court on behalf of The Washington Post

== Other ==
- Edgar Fiedler (1929–2003), economist
- Lauren Spierer, student who disappeared from Indiana University in 2011

== Media, music and entertainment ==
- Jacqueline Alemany, journalist and political reporter
- Bruce Beck, television sportscaster for WNBC-TV
- Walter Carl Becker, musician, songwriter, and record producer, and co-founder of the jazz rock band Steely Dan
- Joan Bennett, Hollywood actress from the 1930s and 40s; once owned a home on Chase Road North
- Aaron Brown, former host of CNN's NewsNight with Aaron Brown; once resided in Scarsdale
- Dorothy Dalton, silent-film actress
- Lisa Donovan, YouTube celebrity (LisaNova); former featured cast member of MadTV; graduated from Scarsdale High School in 1998
- Robert Durst, star of HBO documentary series The Jinx, grew up in Scarsdale
- Jimmy Fink, New York radio personality for WPLJ K-Rock and 107.1 The Peak WXPK
- Judy Garland, actress; lived at 1 Cornell Street
- Rupert Holmes, composer and writer; once resided in Scarsdale
- Al Jolson, 30s film star; owned a house on Fenimore Road in Scarsdale
- Joseph Kaiser, opera, theater, and film actor; grew up in Scarsdale
- Zach Kornfeld, member of The Try Guys
- David Lascher, actor, Hey Dude, Blossom, Sabrina the Teenage Witch, and Beverly Hills, 90210; born and raised in Scarsdale
- Mara Liasson, NPR political correspondent, graduated from Scarsdale (Alternative) High School in 1983.
- Susan Lucci, actor, star of soap TV series All My Children
- Linda McCartney, actress, writer, cinematographer, producer, photographer, vegan business owner; wife of Beatles star Paul McCartney; attended Scarsdale High School
- Liza Minnelli, singer and actress; lived in Scarsdale with her mother, Judy Garland; attended Scarsdale High School; toured Europe and Israel in an SHS production of The Diary of Anne Frank
- Yoko Ono, painter, performance artist, singer, activist; her family moved to Scarsdale in the early 1950s; she later joined them from Japan
- Bill Pankow, film editor, The Black Dahlia, Assault on Precinct 13, Paid In Full
- Robert Pine, actor, CHiPs; was raised in Scarsdale but born in New York City; father of Chris Pine
- Noah Schnapp, actor known for his portrayal of Will Byers in the Netflix science fiction series Stranger Things
- Cevin Soling, filmmaker, musician, and writer; born and raised in Scarsdale
- Too Much Joy, alternative rock band; formed in Scarsdale and three of its four members went to Scarsdale High School
- Nina Totenberg, NPR legal correspondent; graduate of Scarsdale High School
- Ellen Weiss, four-time Peabody award-winning journalist, former NPR vice-president of news; graduate of Scarsdale High School
- Erik von Ancken, multiple Emmy Award winning Television News Anchor / Reporter, Aerospace Correspondent, Manager of Content & Coverage WKMG-TV (CBS) Orlando, Scarsdale High School '94

== Political figures ==
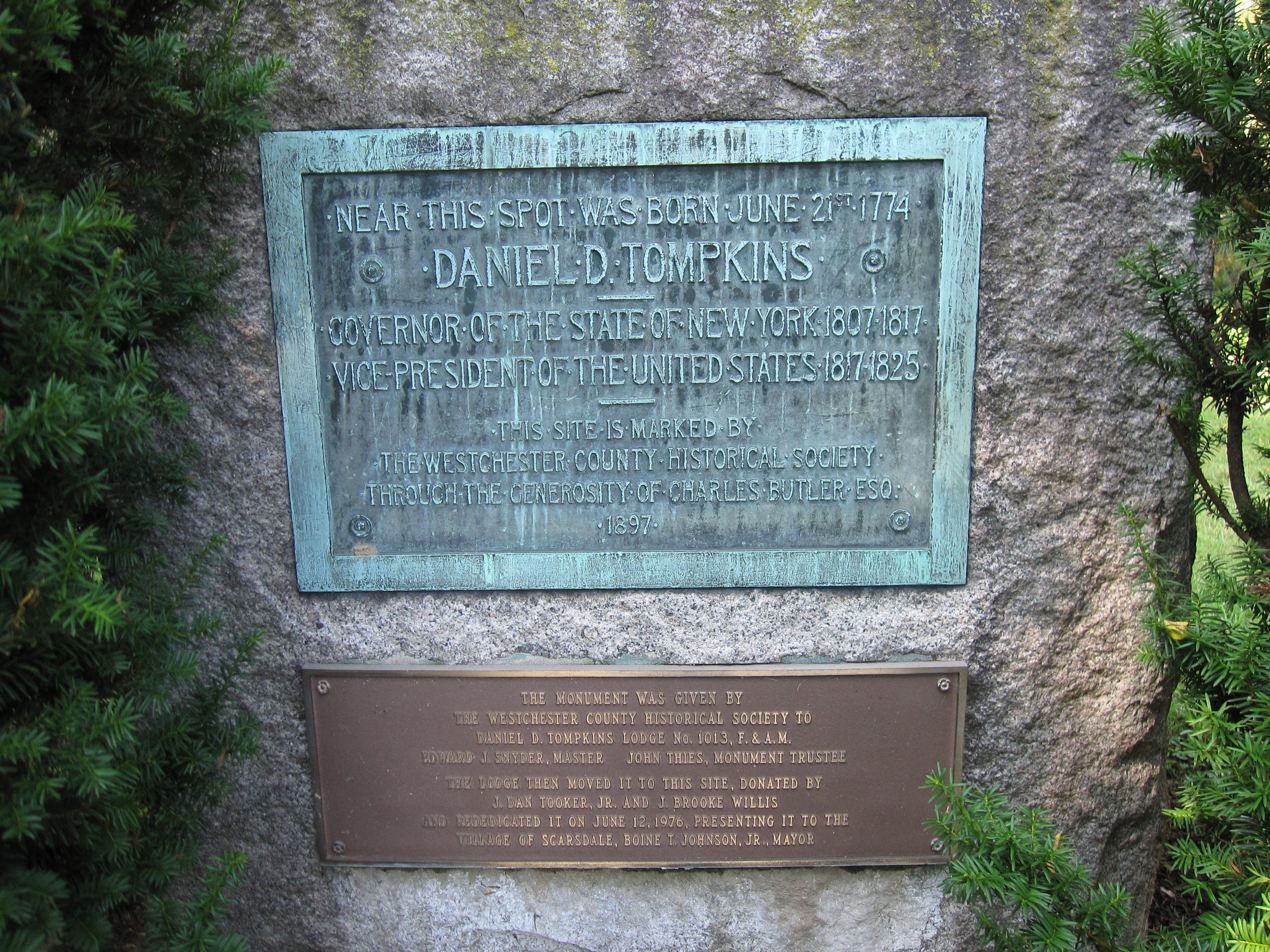
The Daniel D. Tompkins Memorial at the intersection of Post Road and Tompkins Road

- Otto Dohrenwend, chairman of the anti-Communist "Committee of Ten" during the 1950s
- Richard Charles Albert Holbrooke (1941–2010), diplomat, magazine editor, author, professor, Peace Corps official, and investment banker; graduated SHS 1958
- Daniel D. Tompkins, sixth vice president of the United States; born in Scarsdale

== Science and technology ==
- Raymond Ditmars, pioneering herpetologist, author, and long-time curator at the Bronx Zoo, lived and died in Scarsdale
- Jonathan Haidt, social psychologist and professor of Ethical Leadership at New York University's Stern School of Business, raised in Scarsdale
- Jeffrey A. Hoffman, astronaut; born in Brooklyn but considers Scarsdale to be his hometown; SHS graduate
- Maynard Holliday, robotics engineer and senior technology officer at The Pentagon
- Brewster Kahle, Internet pioneer; founded Wide Area Information Servers, Alexa Internet, Internet Archive
- Frank McDowell Leavitt, early engineer and inventor; patent for manufacturing tin cans; inventor of Bliss-Leavitt torpedo
- Benoit Mandelbrot, French mathematician, IBM research scientist and father of fractal geometry
- Ivan Sutherland, computer graphics pioneer; SHS 1955 graduate
- Herman Tarnower, author of The Complete Scarsdale Medical Diet

== Sports ==
- Herman Barron (1909–1978), professional golfer
- Bill Bavasi, Major League Baseball executive; born in Scarsdale
- Trenten Anthony Beram, double gold medalist sprinter born in Scarsdale representing the Philippines
- Nick Civetta, rugby lock/flanker; born in Scarsdale
- Benny Feilhaber, former professional soccer player, head coach of MLS Next Pro side Sporting Kansas City II
- Joe Garagiola (1926–2016), catcher for the St. Louis Cardinals, Pittsburgh Pirates, Chicago Cubs and New York Giants; later a popular sportscaster and TV personality; he and his wife raised their children in Scarsdale
- Frank Gifford (1930–2015), New York Giants star running back; ABC Monday Night Football broadcaster; married to Kathie Lee Gifford
- Lindsay Gottlieb, assistant coach for the Cleveland Cavaliers; born and raised in Scarsdale
- Paul Heyman, professional wrestling manager and former promoter, known for his role in Extreme Championship Wrestling
- Yanni Hufnagel, college basketball coach
- Bruce Lefkowitz, basketball player
- Bill Mazer (1920–2013), New York sports talk and talk show personality; resided in Quaker Ridge from the mid-1960s until his death in 2013
- Allie Sherman, former Philadelphia Eagles quarterback and New York Giants head coach
- Brandon Steiner, founder and CEO of Steiner Sports
- David Stern, former commissioner of the NBA
- Hugh White, captain of the 1901 national champion University of Michigan football team, winners of first Rose Bowl (1902), combined score for season (550-0); engineer and businessman; Scarsdale village president

== Writers ==
- Jacob M. Appel, short-story writer ("Creve Coeur"), playwright (Arborophilia), bioethicist; SHS graduate
- James Fenimore Cooper, author of The Last of the Mohicans; another of his books, The Spy, is set in Scarsdale
- Laura Dave, author, graduated from SHS in 1995
- Eve Ensler, dramatist, raised in Scarsdale, attended SHS
- David Galef, writer and editor of children's books, anthologies of poetry and short fiction, essays, and literary criticism; raised in Scarsdale
- Gish Jen (pseudonym of Lillian Jen), novelist; born in Scarsdale, 1956; a thinly disguised version of Scarsdale is a subject of some of her works
- Richard Kostelanetz, writer and artist; graduated from SHS in 1958
- Nicholas Kristof, journalist and columnist for the New York Times; twice winner of the Pulitzer Prize, most recently in 2006 for columns regarding the humanitarian crisis in Darfur
- Harry M. Lydenberg, librarian, author and book conservationist; best known as long-time director of the New York Public Library
- Esther Morgan McCullough, novelist and anthologist, died in Scarsdale but is buried in Bennington, Vermont
- Derek Milman, novelist
- Dan O'Brien, playwright and poet, The Body of an American, War Reporter; 1992 SHS graduate
- Bryan Reynolds, critical theorist, playwright; graduated SHS in 1983
- Carl Schorske, historian and author of Fin-de-Siècle Vienna: Politics and Culture with his sister,
- Alan Schwarz, reporter for the New York Times; author of The Numbers Game; grew up in Scarsdale and graduated from SHS in 1986
- Nikita Singh, author
- Robert Paul Smith, novelist and playwright, Where Did You Go? Out. What Did You Do? Nothing and The Tender Trap; husband of children's book author and illustrator Elinor Goulding
- Aaron Sorkin, writer and creator of TV series Sports Night and The West Wing; raised in Scarsdale
- Andrew Ross Sorkin, financial columnist for the New York Times; editor of DealBook, an online financial daily report; graduated SHS in 1995
- Florence Wald, former dean of the Yale School of Nursing; founder of American Hospice
- Sheryl WuDunn, Pulitzer Prize-winning journalist and columnist for the New York Times; married to Nicholas D. Kristof, also a columnist for The Times
