= List of diplomatic missions of Seychelles =

This is a list of diplomatic missions of Seychelles. The Indian Ocean island country of the Seychelles has only a few diplomatic missions overseas, although it has a very large number of honorary consulates (not listed below).

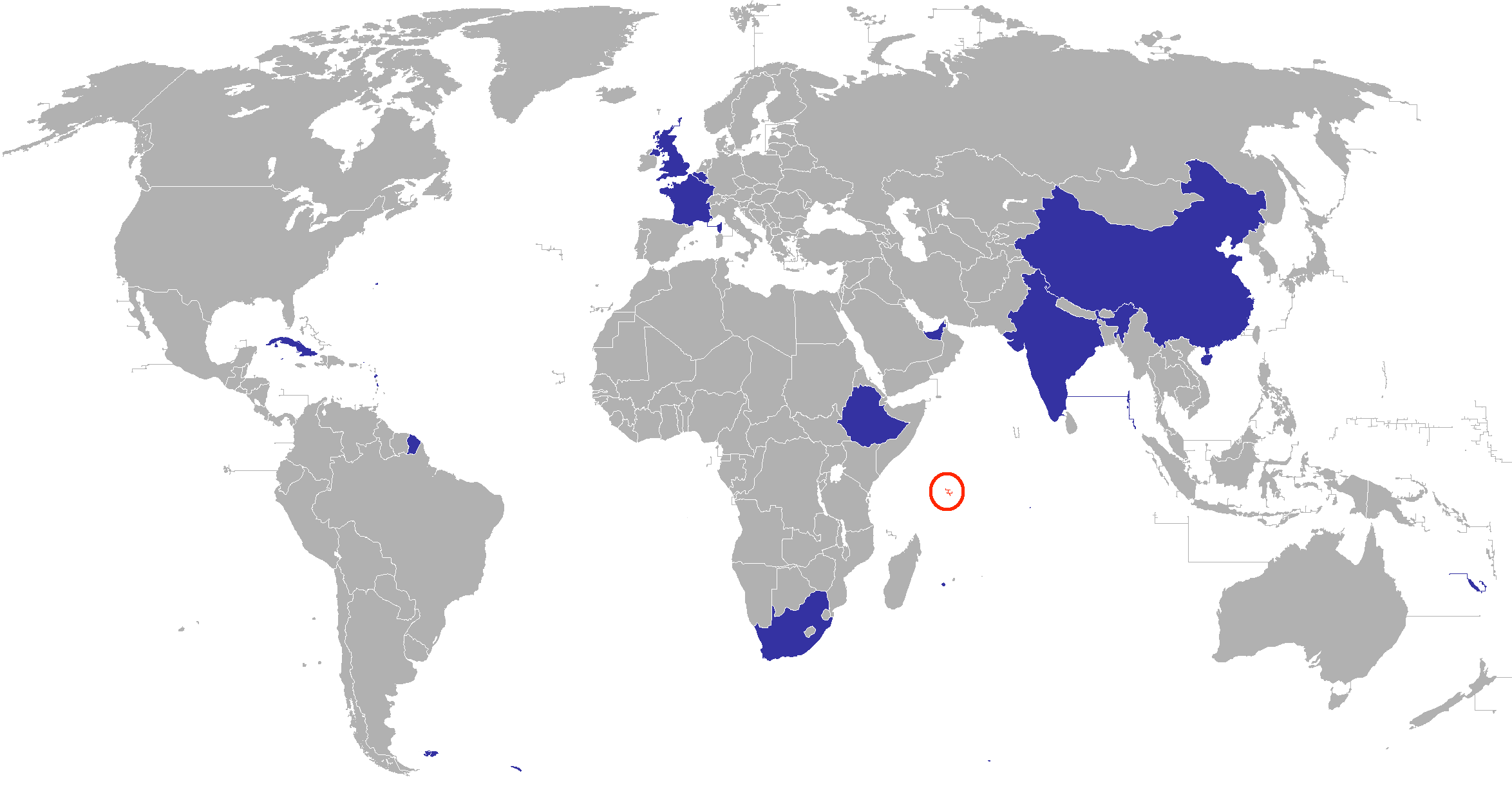
Diplomatic missions of Seychelles

== Current missions ==
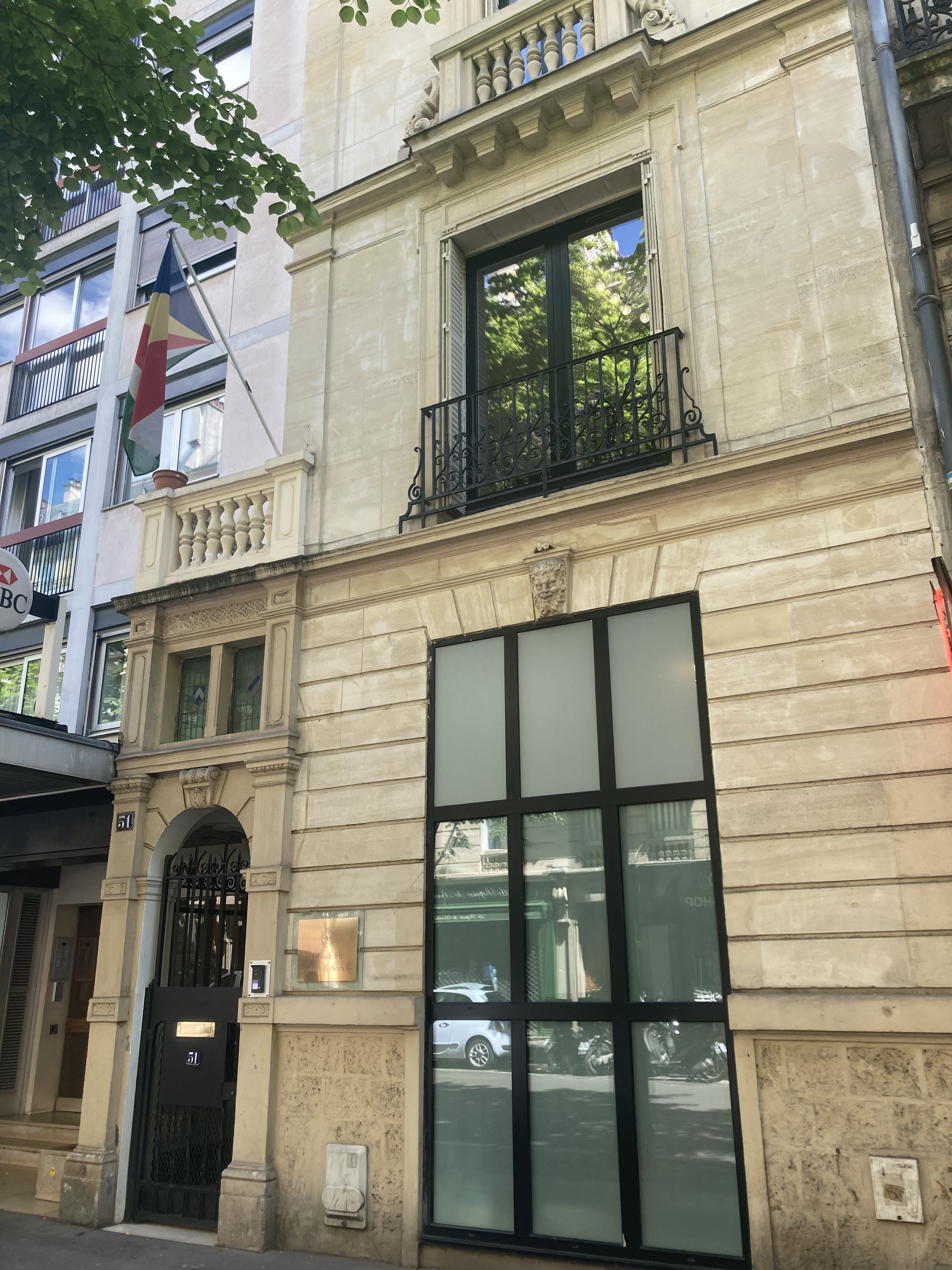
Embassy of Seychelles in Paris

=== Africa ===
Host country	Host city	Mission	Concurrent accreditation	Ref.
Ethiopia	Addis Ababa	Embassy	Countries: Algeria; Benin; Burkina Faso; Cameroon; Cape Verde; Central African Republic; Djibouti; Egypt; Equatorial Guinea; Eritrea; Gabon; Gambia; Ghana; Guinea; Ivory Coast; Kenya; Liberia; Mali; Mauritania; Morocco; Niger; Nigeria; São Tomé and Príncipe; Senegal; Sierra Leone; Somalia; South Sudan; Sudan; Togo; Tunisia; Uganda; Consular jurisdiction only: (Note: The following countries are listed only under the consular jurisdiction of the Seychellois Embassy in Addis Ababa. As of 2025, Seychelles has yet to establish formal diplomatic relations with any of them.); Chad; Guinea-Bissau; Multilateral Organizations: African Union; United Nations Economic Commission for Africa	
South Africa	Pretoria	High Commission	Countries: Angola; Botswana; Burundi; Comoros; Congo-Brazzaville; Congo-Kinshasa; Eswatini; Lesotho; Madagascar; Malawi; Mauritius; Namibia; Rwanda; Tanzania; Zambia; Zimbabwe; Multilateral Organizations: Indian Ocean Commission; Common Market for Eastern and Southern Africa; Southern African Development Community	
South Africa	Johannesburg	Consulate-General	Countries: Angola; Botswana; Burundi; Comoros; Congo-Brazzaville; Congo-Kinshasa; Eswatini; Lesotho; Madagascar; Malawi; Mauritius; Namibia; Rwanda; Tanzania; Zambia; Zimbabwe; Multilateral Organizations: Indian Ocean Commission; Common Market for Eastern and Southern Africa; Southern African Development Community	

=== Americas ===
Host country	Host city	Mission	Concurrent accreditation	Ref.
Cuba	Havana	Embassy		

=== Asia ===
Host country	Host city	Mission	Concurrent accreditation	Ref.
China	Beijing	Embassy	Countries: Japan; Malaysia; North Korea; South Korea	
China	Shanghai	Consulate-General	Countries: Japan; Malaysia; North Korea; South Korea	
India	New Delhi	High Commission	Countries: Australia; Bangladesh; Brunei; Indonesia; Israel; Laos; Maldives; Myanmar; Nepal; New Zealand; Philippines; Sri Lanka; Thailand; Vietnam; Consular jurisdiction only: Bhutan (Note: Bhutan is listed only under the consular jurisdiction of the Seychellois High Commission in New Delhi. As of 2024, the two countries have yet to establish formal diplomatic relations.); Multilateral Organizations: Association of Southeast Asian Nations; Indian Ocean Rim Association; International Solar Alliance	
United Arab Emirates	Abu Dhabi	Embassy	Countries: Afghanistan; Azerbaijan; Bahrain; Iran; Iraq; Kazakhstan; Kuwait; Kyrgyzstan; Lebanon; Pakistan; Palestine; Qatar; Saudi Arabia; Tajikistan; Turkmenistan; Uzbekistan; Yemen; Consular jurisdiction only: (Note: The following countries are listed only under the consular jurisdiction of the Seychellois Embassy in Abu Dhabi. As of 2025, Seychelles has yet to establish formal diplomatic relations with any of them.); Jordan; Syria; Multilateral Organizations: Abu Dhabi Fund for Development; Gulf Cooperation Council; International Renewable Energy Agency; Kuwait Fund for Arab Economic Development	

=== Europe ===
Host country	Host city	Mission	Concurrent accreditation	Ref.
Belgium	Brussels	Embassy	Countries: Bosnia and Herzegovina; Bulgaria; Croatia; Holy See; Hungary; Luxembourg; Montenegro; Netherlands; North Macedonia; Poland; Romania; Slovenia; Consular jurisdiction only: (Note: The following countries are listed only under the consular jurisdiction of the Seychellois Embassy in Brussels. As of 2024, Seychelles has yet to establish formal diplomatic relations with any of them.); Liechtenstein; Sovereign Entity: Sovereign Military Order of Malta; Multilateral Organizations: European Union; International Court of Justice; International Criminal Court; NATO; Organisation of African, Caribbean and Pacific States; Organisation for the Prohibition of Chemical Weapons; World Trade Organization	
France	Paris	Embassy	Countries: Armenia; Austria; Belarus; Czechia; Estonia; Georgia; Greece; Italy; Latvia; Lithuania; Moldova; Monaco; Portugal; San Marino; Serbia; Slovakia; Spain; Russia; Turkey; Ukraine; Multilateral Organizations: Food and Agriculture Organization; Francophonie; International Atomic Energy Agency; International Fund for Agricultural Development; Interpol; UNESCO; UN Tourism	
United Kingdom	London	High Commission	Countries: Cyprus; Denmark; Finland; Germany; Iceland; Ireland; Malta; Norway; Sweden; Multilateral Organizations: Commonwealth of Nations; International Maritime Organization	

=== Multilateral organisations ===
Organization	Host city	Host country	Mission	Concurrent accreditation	Ref.
United Nations	New York City	United States	Permanent Mission	Countries: Antigua and Barbuda; Argentina; Bahamas; Brazil; Canada; Colombia; Cook Islands; Dominica; Dominican Republic; El Salvador; Fiji; Guatemala; Grenada; Haiti; Kiribati; Marshall Islands; Mexico; Micronesia; Nauru; Palau; Saint Kitts and Nevis; Saint Lucia; Saint Vincent and the Grenadines; Samoa; Solomon Islands; Suriname; Tonga; Trinidad and Tobago; Tuvalu; United States; Vanuatu; Venezuela; Consular jurisdiction only: (Note: The following countries are listed only under the consular jurisdiction of the Seychellois Permanent Mission to the United Missions in New York City. As of 2024, Seychelles has yet to establish formal diplomatic relations with any of them.); Barbados; Bolivia; Honduras; Papua New Guinea; Multilateral Organizations: Global Environment Facility; International Monetary Fund; Non-Aligned Movement; World Bank Group	
United Nations	Geneva	Switzerland	Permanent Mission	Countries: Switzerland; Multilateral Organizations: International Committee of the Red Cross; International Organization for Standardization; International Organization for Migration; International Labour Organization; Inter-Parliamentary Union; United Nations Commission on Human Rights; United Nations Conference on Trade and Development; United Nations High Commissioner for Refugees; United Nations Office for the Coordination of Humanitarian Affairs; United Nations Industrial Development Organization; World Business Council for Sustainable Development; World Economic Forum; World Health Organization; World Intellectual Property Organization; World Meteorological Organization	

== Closed missions ==
=== Asia ===
Host country	Host city	Mission	Year closed	Ref.
Sri Lanka	Colombo	High Commission (Note: Resident in New Delhi, India)	2020	

== See also ==
- Foreign relations of Seychelles
- List of diplomatic missions in Seychelles
- Visa policy of Seychelles
