= Giovinella Gonthier =

Ambassador to the United States
- In office 1983–1987
- President: France-Albert René
- Preceded by: Bernard Michel Loustau-Lalanne
- Succeeded by: Marc Michael Rogers Marengo

Permanent Representative of Seychelles to the United Nations
- In office 1979–1987
- President: France-Albert René

Personal details
- Born: January 11, 1949 Dar es Salaam, Tanganyika Territory
- Died: May 21, 2012 (aged 63)

Giovinella Gonthier (January 11, 1949 – May 21, 2012) was a teacher, concierge, diplomat, author, and consultant.

== Biography ==
Gonthier was born in Dar es Salaam, Tanganyika to parents originally from the Seychelles. She graduated from Arusha Secondary School in 1968, Wheaton College (Massachusetts) (Class of 1972, history major) and the Harvard Graduate School of Education (Master's Degree in Teaching, 1973).

When she graduated Harvard, she taught at Seychelles College until 1975. She married Roger Wilson, whom she had met at Harvard, on March 7, 1975. When they moved to Chicago, she taught at the University of Chicago Lab School before working as a concierge.

== Diplomatic career ==
When the Seychelles gained their independence from Britain, Gonthier accepted the offer to establish the office of the Permanent Mission of the Republic of Seychelles to the United Nations, and become the Seychelles' Representative to the United Nations. She was ambassador from 1979 to 1987. From 1983 until 1987, she was also ambassador to the United States.

== Publications ==
Rude Awakenings: Overcoming the Civility Crisis in the Workplace 2002,
