= Willard Livingstone Beard =

American missionary (1865–1947)

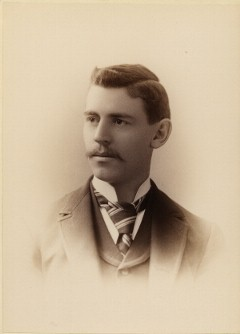
- Missionary to China
- Born: February 5, 1865; Huntington, Connecticut
- Died: April 15, 1947 (aged 82); Jacksonville, Florida

Willard Livingstone Beard (Chinese: 裨益知; Pinyin: Bì Yìzhī; Foochow Romanized: Bĭ Ék-dĭ; February 5, 1865 – April 15, 1947) was an American missionary serving under the American Board of Commissioners for Foreign Missions in Fuzhou, China.

== Life ==
Willard Livingstone Beard was born in Huntington, Connecticut on February 5, 1865. He enrolled at Oberlin College in 1887, and graduated with a Bachelor of Arts in 1891. In 1894 he graduated from Hartford Seminary.

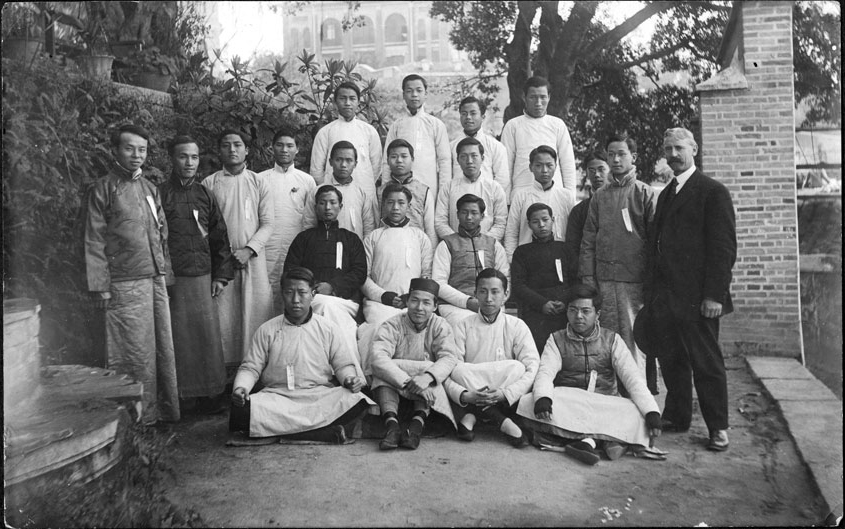
W.L. Beard with his students at conference, Fuzhou, ca. 1911-1913

In 1894, Beard started missionary work in China, serving with the American Board of Commissioners for Foreign Missions. In 1904, he was released to start a YMCA in Fukien Province (now Fujian), for which he served as general secretary until 1909. In 1910, he returned to the United States, and served as a secretary of the ABCFM in New York City for two years. In 1912, Beard returned to China, and held a position as president of Foochow College until 1927. From 1927 to 1936 he returned to general missionary work in China. And after a brief time home in the United States, Beard served two more years for the ABCFM in Fuzhou.

At the outbreak of World War II, Beard returned to his hometown, where he remained for the rest of his life. On April 15, 1947, he died of heart attack at the home of his daughter in Jacksonville, Florida.

Beard’s papers at held at the Yale University Library.

== Family ==
Beard had two sisters, Flora and Mary; in 1914, they founded the North China American School (NCAS) for missionary children in Beijing.

Beard married Ellen Kinney in 1894, and they had six children; Ellen died in 1953.

== Sources ==
- Oberlin College Archives
- 福州基督教青年会追寻 (in Chinese)
