= Foreign relations of Seychelles =

The Seychelles follows a policy of what it describes as "positive" nonalignment and strongly supports the principle of reduced superpower presence in the Indian Ocean. The Seychelles' foreign policy position has placed it generally toward the left of the spectrum within the Non-Aligned Movement. Russia, the United Kingdom, France, India, the People's Republic of China, Libya and Cuba maintain embassies in Victoria.

The government of the Seychelles withdrew diplomatic recognition of the Sahrawi Arab Democratic Republic on March 17, 2008, according to an official government source.

== Trends ==
The Seychelles government is one of the proponents of the Indian Ocean zone of peace concept and it has promoted an end to the United States presence on Diego Garcia. The country has adopted a pragmatic policy, however, and serves as an important rest and recreation stop for US ships serving in the Persian Gulf and Indian Ocean.

In its foreign relations, the Seychelles maximizes the benefits it receives from both China and India by taking advantage of those two countries' rivalry with respect to the strategic waterway in which the Seychelles exists.

== Diplomatic relations ==
List of countries which the Seychelles maintains diplomatic relations with:

#	Country	Date
1	United Kingdom	29 June 1976
2	Australia	29 June 1976
3	Canada	29 June 1976
4	France	29 June 1976
5	India	29 June 1976
6	Italy	29 June 1976
7	Japan	29 June 1976
8	Pakistan	29 June 1976
9	Russia	29 June 1976
10	South Korea	29 June 1976
11	China	30 June 1976
12	Romania	30 June 1976
13	Belgium	1 July 1976
14	Cyprus	1 July 1976
15	United States	1 July 1976
16	Egypt	14 July 1976
17	Iran	July 1976
18	Serbia	1 August 1976
19	Libya	15 August 1976
20	Portugal	16 August 1976
21	Vietnam	16 August 1976
22	North Korea	24 August 1976
23	Algeria	September 1976
24	Czech Republic	14 December 1976
25	Austria	12 January 1977
26	Germany	18 January 1977
27	Netherlands	19 January 1977
28	Nigeria	28 January 1977
29	Hungary	30 November 1977
30	Guinea	4 April 1978
31	Cuba	12 April 1978
32	Spain	3 November 1978
33	Jamaica	15 January 1979
34	Poland	12 February 1979
35	Sweden	14 August 1979
36	Denmark	27 November 1979
37	Grenada	22 April 1980
38	Albania	16 May 1980
39	Maldives	1 July 1980
40	Greece	16 July 1980
41	Bulgaria	14 August 1980
42	Mongolia	20 August 1980
43	Iraq	17 February 1981
44	Switzerland	10 March 1981
45	Ethiopia	14 April 1982
46	United Arab Emirates	18 December 1982
47	Bangladesh	28 February 1983
48	Oman	13 April 1983
49	Bahrain	4 May 1983
50	Mozambique	August 1983
51	Qatar	7 April 1984
52	Nicaragua	22 May 1984
—	Holy See	27 July 1984
53	Norway	1 February 1985
54	Indonesia	16 December 1985
55	Somalia	14 April 1986
56	Mexico	1 June 1986
57	Vanuatu	15 July 1986
58	Tunisia	25 August 1986
59	Argentina	2 October 1986
60	Nepal	10 October 1986
61	São Tomé and Príncipe	22 October 1986
62	Angola	7 November 1986
63	Brazil	10 November 1986
64	Tanzania	11 November 1986
65	Fiji	4 December 1986
66	Cape Verde	9 March 1987
67	Zimbabwe	11 March 1987
68	Finland	1 April 1987
69	Malaysia	1 May 1987
70	Philippines	9 October 1987
71	Benin	1 March 1988
72	Comoros	30 June 1988
73	Senegal	8 July 1988
74	Kuwait	11 July 1988
75	Saint Lucia	13 July 1988
76	Mauritius	17 July 1988
77	Thailand	19 July 1988
78	Colombia	5 August 1988
79	Singapore	16 September 1988
80	Botswana	30 September 1988
81	Ghana	10 October 1988
82	Morocco	17 December 1988
83	Luxembourg	17 February 1989
84	Malta	11 April 1989
85	Madagascar	12 April 1989
86	Ivory Coast	19 April 1989
87	Kenya	10 January 1990
88	Brunei	1 May 1990
89	Iceland	8 November 1990
—	State of Palestine	1990
90	Venezuela	15 April 1991
91	Chile	30 October 1991
92	Belize	20 November 1991
93	Ecuador	6 December 1991
94	Namibia	9 December 1991
95	Saint Kitts and Nevis	12 December 1991
96	Mauritania	10 January 1992
97	Peru	15 January 1992
98	Costa Rica	17 March 1992
99	Uganda	6 April 1992
100	Israel	30 June 1992
101	Slovenia	21 October 1992
102	New Zealand	1992
103	Slovakia	6 January 1993
104	Guatemala	13 January 1993
105	Marshall Islands	2 February 1993
106	Djibouti	3 February 1993
107	Equatorial Guinea	14 April 1993
108	Paraguay	23 April 1993
109	Guyana	28 April 1993
110	Panama	21 May 1993
111	Lithuania	1 July 1993
112	South Africa	23 March 1994
113	Latvia	23 March 1994
—	Sovereign Military Order of Malta	7 June 1994
114	Ukraine	30 September 1994
115	Azerbaijan	2 November 1994
116	Turkey	22 June 1995
117	Cambodia	15 August 1996
118	Gabon	14 November 1996
119	Croatia	30 September 1997
120	Zambia	11 March 1998
121	Sri Lanka	3 October 1998
122	Ireland	9 October 1999
123	Andorra	28 April 2000
124	Samoa	29 August 2000
125	Saudi Arabia	28 September 2000
126	Haiti	15 October 2000
127	North Macedonia	7 February 2001
128	Mali	April 2001
129	Malawi	22 May 2001
130	Sudan	21 September 2001
131	Belarus	4 October 2001
132	Eswatini	14 March 2002
133	San Marino	14 March 2002
134	Eritrea	25 April 2002
135	Tonga	12 July 2002
136	Burundi	15 July 2002
137	Armenia	24 March 2006
138	Laos	22 June 2006
139	Estonia	15 November 2006
140	Monaco	15 April 2008
141	Dominican Republic	23 September 2008
142	Uruguay	12 November 2008
143	Trinidad and Tobago	24 November 2009
144	Montenegro	19 May 2010
145	Rwanda	5 October 2010
146	Solomon Islands	20 December 2010
147	Tuvalu	20 December 2010
148	Lesotho	25 January 2011
149	Nauru	14 April 2011
150	Georgia	15 March 2013
151	South Sudan	24 July 2013
152	Kyrgyzstan	5 March 2014
153	Kazakhstan	11 March 2014
154	Bosnia and Herzegovina	4 June 2014
155	Niger	18 November 2014
156	Togo	3 March 2015
157	Palau	30 March 2015
158	Afghanistan	24 February 2017
159	Kiribati	24 February 2017
160	Central African Republic	16 May 2017
161	Burkina Faso	16 May 2017
162	Saint Vincent and the Grenadines	26 May 2017
163	Myanmar	12 July 2017
164	Tajikistan	28 December 2017
165	Dominica	23 June 2021
166	Gambia	16 November 2023
—	Cook Islands	31 May 2024
167	Turkmenistan	13 August 2024
168	Suriname	22 September 2024
169	Antigua and Barbuda	23 September 2024
170	Uzbekistan	23 September 2024
171	Bahamas	24 October 2024
172	El Salvador	12 November 2024
173	Sierra Leone	16 February 2025
174	Lebanon	25 June 2025
175	Cameroon	11 February 2026
176	Liberia	13 February 2026
177	Moldova	28 April 2026
178	Federated States of Micronesia	19 August 2026
179	Republic of the Congo	24 September 2026
180	Honduras	24 September 2026
181	Democratic Republic of the Congo	Unknown
182	Yemen	Unknown

== Bilateral relations ==
=== Americas ===
Country	Formal Relations Began	Notes
Cuba	12 April 1978	On 26 April 2017 President Seychelles inaugurated the embassy of Seychelles in Havana.
Mexico	1 June 1986	Diplomatic relations between Seychelles and Mexico established as of 1 June 1986: Mexico is accredited to the Seychelles from its embassy in Nairobi, Kenya.; Seychelles does not have an accreditation to Mexico.
United States	1 July 1976	See Seychelles–United States relations: Seychelles is accredited to the United States from its Permanent Mission to the United Nations in New York City.; United States has an embassy in Victoria.

=== Asia ===
Country	Formal Relations Began	Notes
China	30 June 1976	See China–Seychelles relations: China has an embassy in Victoria.; Seychelles has an embassy in Beijing and a consulate-general in Shanghai.
India	29 June 1976	See India–Seychelles relations Diplomatic relations between Seychelles and India established as of 29 June 1976 In an effort to reduce the increasing piracy in the nearby region, Seychelles requested the Indian Navy to carry out anti-piracy operations in her waters. This made India-Seychelles relations stronger. The Seychelles also praised the Indian Navy for their anti-piracy operations.: India has a High Commission in Victoria.; Seychelles maintains a High Commission in New Delhi.
Malaysia	1 May 1987	See Malaysia–Seychelles relations
North Korea	29 June 1976 and 24 August 1976	See North Korea–Seychelles relations
Turkey	22 June 1995	Diplomatic relations between Seychelles and Turkey established as of 22 June 1995: Embassy of Seychelles in Paris is accredited to Turkey.; The Turkish Embassy in Nairobi is accredited to Seychelles.; Trade volume between the two countries was US$25.4 million in 2019 (Turkish exports/imports: 17.7/7.7 million USD).
Vietnam	16 August 1979	President James Alix Michel's official visited to Vietnam in August, 2013. The statement says this is an official visit to Vietnam made by a high-ranking leader of Seychelles.

=== Europe ===
Country	Formal Relations Began	Notes
Cyprus	1 July 1976	Diplomatic relations between Seychelles and Cyprus established as of 1 July 1976: Both countries a members of the Commonwealth of Nations; List of bilateral agreements.; Cyprus is represented in Seychelles through its embassy in Muscat, Oman.; Seychelles is represented in Cyprus through its High Commission in London, United Kingdom. Two countries are a member of La Francophonie.
France	29 June 1976	Diplomatic relations between Seychelles and France established as of 29 June 1976 Embassy of Seychelles in Paris: France has an embassy in Victoria.; Seychelles has an embassy in Paris.; Seychelles claimed the French-owned Glorioso Islands in the Indian Ocean before the France–Seychelles Maritime Boundary Agreement.; Both countries are members of La Francophonie.
Greece	16 July 1980	Diplomatic relations between Seychelles and Greece established as of 16 July 1980: Greece is accredited to Seychelles from its embassy in Nairobi, Kenya.; Seychelles is accredited to Greece from its embassy in Paris, France.
Russia	30 June 1976	See Russia–Seychelles relations Diplomatic relations between Seychelles and the Soviet Union were established on 30 June 1976, a day after the island nation gained its independence from the United Kingdom.: Russia has an embassy in Victoria.; Seychelles is accredited to Russia from its embassy in Paris, France and maintains an honorary consulate in Saint Petersburg.
Switzerland	10 March 1981	Diplomatic relations between Seychelles and Switzerland established as of 10 March 1981; Both countries are full members of the Organisation internationale de la Francophonie.; Seychelles is accredited to Switzerland from its embassy in Paris, France.; Switzerland is accredited to Seychelles from its embassy in Antananarivo, Madagascar.
United Kingdom	29 June 1976	See Seychelles–United Kingdom relations British Prime Minister David Cameron with Seychellois Prime Minister James Michel in 10 Downing Street, February 2012 Seychelles established diplomatic relations with the United Kingdom on 29 June 1976.: Seychelles maintains a high commission in London.; The United Kingdom is accredited to Seychelles through its high commission in Victoria.; The UK governed Seychelles from 1811 to 1968, when Seychelles achieved full independence. Both countries share common membership of the Commonwealth, the International Criminal Court, the United Nations, the World Health Organization, and the World Trade Organization, as well as the Eastern and Southern Africa–UK Economic Partnership Agreement. Bilaterally the two countries have an Economic Security Partnership.

== See also ==
- List of diplomatic missions in Seychelles
- List of diplomatic missions of Seychelles
