= Seychelles–United Kingdom relations =

- Seychelles: United Kingdom

Diplomatic mission
- High Commission of Seychelles, London: High Commission of the United Kingdom, Victoria

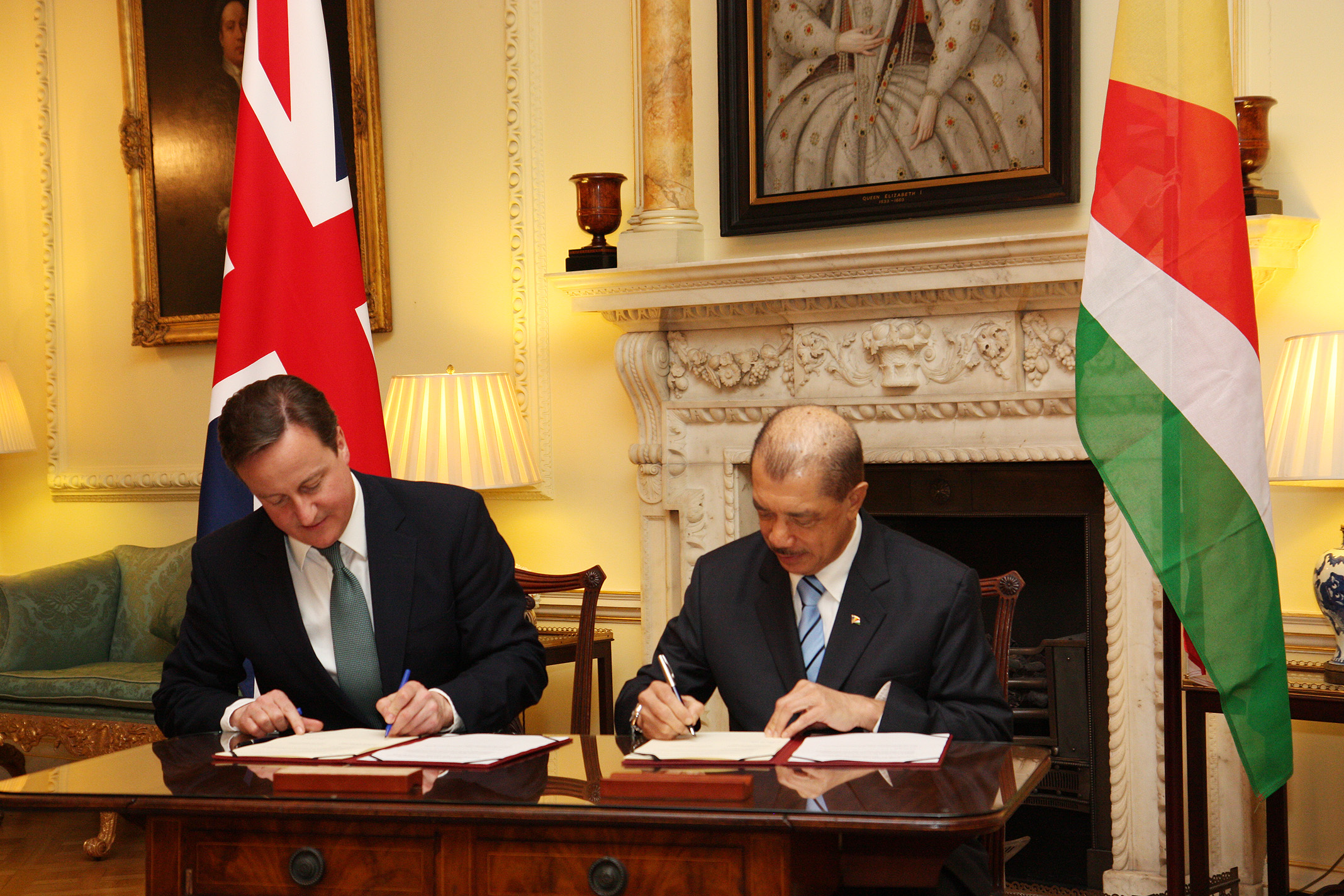
British Prime Minister David Cameron with Seychellois Prime Minister James Michel in 10 Downing Street, February 2012

Seychelles–United Kingdom relations are the bilateral relations between Seychelles and the United Kingdom. The UK governed Seychelles from 1811 to 1976, when Seychelles achieved full independence. Both countries established diplomatic relations on 29 June 1976.

Both countries share common membership of the Commonwealth, the International Criminal Court, the United Nations, the World Health Organization, and the World Trade Organization, as well as the Eastern and Southern Africa–UK Economic Partnership Agreement. Bilaterally the two countries have an Economic Security Partnership.

== History ==
The UK governed Seychelles from 1811 to 1976, when Seychelles achieved full independence.

== Economic relations ==
From 4 August 2014 until 30 December 2020, trade between Seychelles and the UK was governed by the Eastern and Southern Africa–European Community Economic Partnership Agreement, while the United Kingdom was a member of the European Union.

Following the withdrawal of the United Kingdom from the European Union, the United Kingdom and Mauritius, Seychelles, and Zimbabwe signed the Eastern and Southern Africa–United Kingdom Economic Partnership Agreement on 31 January 2019. The Eastern and Southern Africa–United Kingdom Economic Partnership Agreement is a continuity trade agreement, based on the EU free trade agreement, which entered into force on 1 January 2021. Trade value between COMESA states and the United Kingdom was worth £1,922 million in 2022.

== Diplomatic missions ==
- Seychelles maintains a high commission in London.
- The United Kingdom is accredited to Seychelles through its high commission in Victoria.

== See also ==
- Foreign relations of Seychelles
- Foreign relations of the United Kingdom
