= North Korea–Seychelles relations =

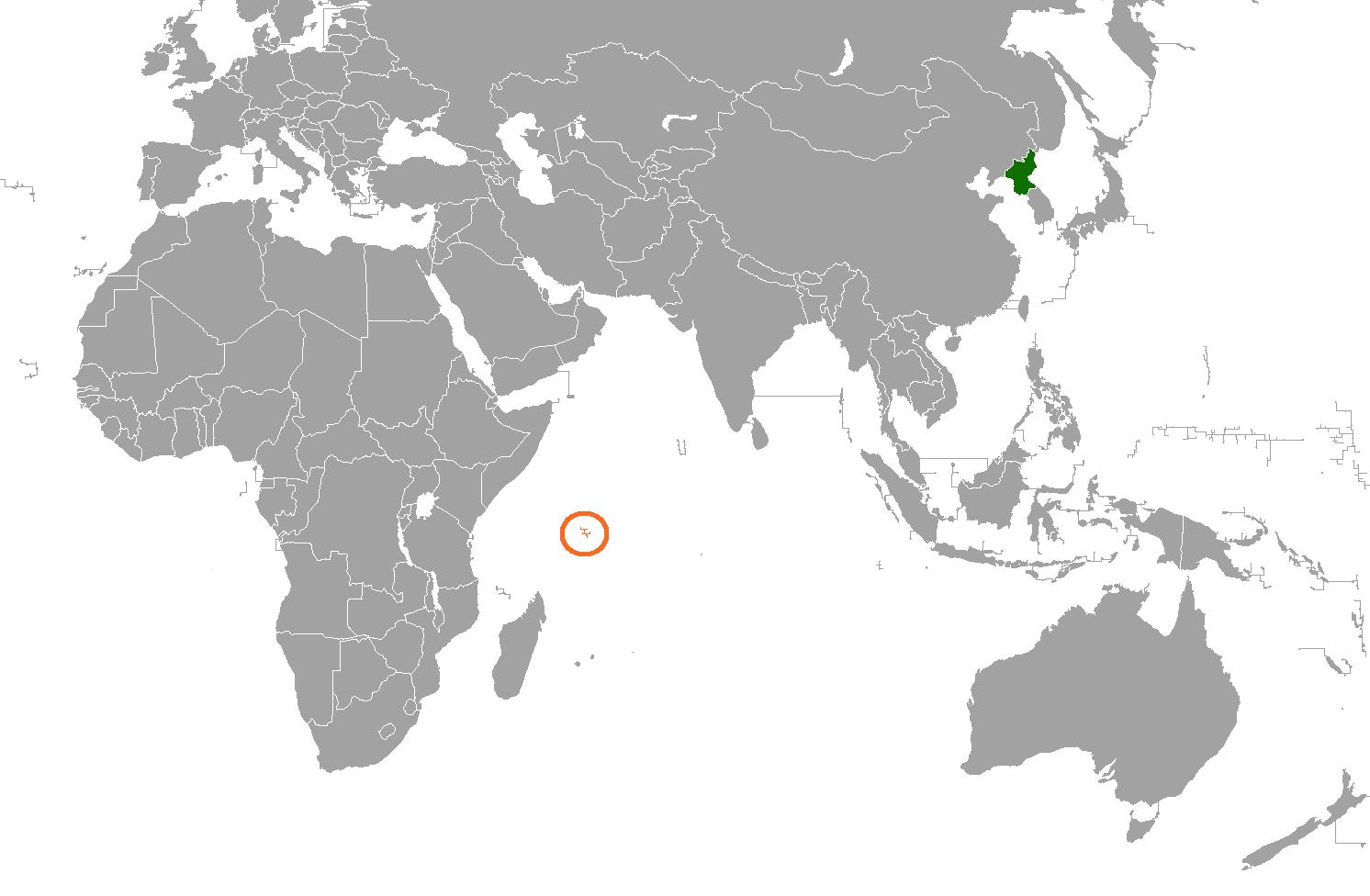

- North Korea: Seychelles

North Korea–Seychelles relations refers to the current and historical relationship between North Korea and Seychelles. Neither country maintains an embassy in their respective capitals.

During the 1977–2004 rule of President France-Albert René, the socialist and non-aligned government of Seychelles – a small African Indian Ocean island nation – maintained close relations with the Democratic Republic of Korea, commonly known as North Korea. The country received significant North Korean developmental aid. Much of the cooperation was military. Uniformed North Korean soldiers were present in the country in 1980. Another example of military cooperation was the 1983 deployment of fifty-five North Korean instructors and interpreters to aid the military of Seychelles.

During his time in power, President René visited Pyongyang several times, meeting with Kim Il Sung. During one meeting in 1988, he expressed support for Korean reunification, and applauded the idea of a Democratic Confederal Republic of Koryo. At the end of that visit, the two countries signed a treaty of economic cooperation.

In 2012 the Seychellois government – together with that of Kiribati – was accused of providing passports to North Koreans involved in illegal arms smuggling.

== See also ==
- Foreign relations of North Korea
- Foreign relations of Seychelles
