= Claude Morel =

Seychellois diplomat

- Born: 25 September 1956 (age 69); Victoria
- Occupation: Diplomat

Claude Sylvestre Anthony Morel (born 25 September 1956 in Victoria) is a Seychellois diplomat. He was the Chief of Protocol at the Ministry of Foreign Affairs, Director-General for Foreign Affairs and International Cooperation at the Ministry of Foreign Affairs, and Permanent Representative to the European Commission in Brussels. He served as Permanent Representative to the United Nations and Ambassador of Seychelles to the United States, Canada, and Cuba. He became Ambassador to the United States in March 1998.

In February 2005, Jérémie Bonnelame was appointed to replace him as Ambassador and Permanent Representative, and Morel was instead appointed as Principal Secretary for Foreign Affairs. In July 2007, he was replaced in that post by Callixte d'Offay and was instead appointed as Ambassador to France, presenting his credentials to French President Nicolas Sarkozy on November 19, 2007. He was also appointed as Permanent Delegate to UNESCO, presenting his credentials in October 2007. On April 15, 2008, he additionally presented his credentials as Ambassador to Monaco, becoming the first Seychellois ambassador to be accredited to that country. He also represents the Seychelles at the FAO. Morel was appointed as Foreign Secretary effective from 1 March 2017.
