= Russia–Seychelles relations =

- Russia: Seychelles

Russia–Seychelles relations (Russian: Российско-сейшельские отношения) are the bilateral relations of Russia and Seychelles. Seychelles is represented in Russia through its embassy in Paris (France) and two honorary consulates (in Saint Petersburg and Yekaterinburg).

== Soviet-era relations ==
Seychelles–Soviet Union relations
- Seychelles: Soviet Union

Diplomatic relations between Seychelles and the Soviet Union were established on 30 June 1976, a day after the island nation gained its independence from the United Kingdom. Russia has an embassy in Victoria. On 15 February 1980, the Soviet Union and Seychelles signed the Agreement on merchant navigation in Victoria. The government of Seychellois President France-Albert René supported the Soviet invasion of Afghanistan.

In 1987 The Sunday Times, quoting unnamed US intelligence officers, reported that the Soviet Union had landed 50 naval infantry troops in the Seychelles after making landfall on the Ivan Rogov in October 1986; a month after a foiled assassination attempt on René.

== Modern relations ==
In February 2009, Alexander Vladimirov, Russia's Ambassador to Seychelles paid a final visit to President James Michel and Vice-President Joseph Belmont at the State House. On April 19, 2026, Seychelles President Patrick Herminie visited Moscow, holding discussions with Russian President Vladimir Putin. Russian servicemen of the 154th Preobrazhensky Independent Commandant's Regiment marched in a military parade at Unity Stadium marking the 50th anniversary of Seychelles' independence on 29 June.

== Economic relations ==
Bilateral trade between Russia and the Seychelles in 2008 reached a total of US$6.23 million. Russia exported some US$4.54 million worth of goods and services to the Seychelles, including mineral oils, machinery and equipment. The Seychelles exports to Russia totalled US$1.69 million made up of fish, seafood and spices.

In 1999 an agreement on co-operation in the field of tourism was concluded between the two nations, and in 2008 some 6,400 Russian tourists visited the Seychelles. Burgeoning Russian tourism to the Seychelles led the Seychellois national airline Air Seychelles to launch a weekly flight to Moscow's Vnukovo International Airport in March 2009, with the expectation of the addition of another weekly flight once its presence in the Russian market has been consolidated.

== See also ==
- Foreign relations of Russia
- Foreign relations of Seychelles
- List of ambassadors of Russia to Seychelles
