= Marie-Louise Potter =

Seychellois politician and diplomat

Marie Louise Potter
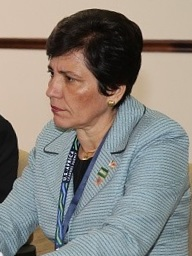
- Occupations: Politician, diplomat

Marie-Louise Potter (born March 15, 1959) is a Seychellois politician and diplomat member of the National Assembly of Seychelles. She is a member of the Seychelles People's Progressive Front and was first elected to the Assembly in 1993. In 2007, she became the leader of Government Business. Potter was appointed in March 2012 as the Permanent Representative of Seychelles to the United Nations, on June 9, 2012, as the Seychelles Ambassador to the United States, as High Commissioner (Commonwealth) to Ottawa, and on 1 November 2016 as Foreign Secretary, and retired from these posts on 1 March 2017.
