= Elizabeth Broun =

American art historian and former museum director (born 1946)

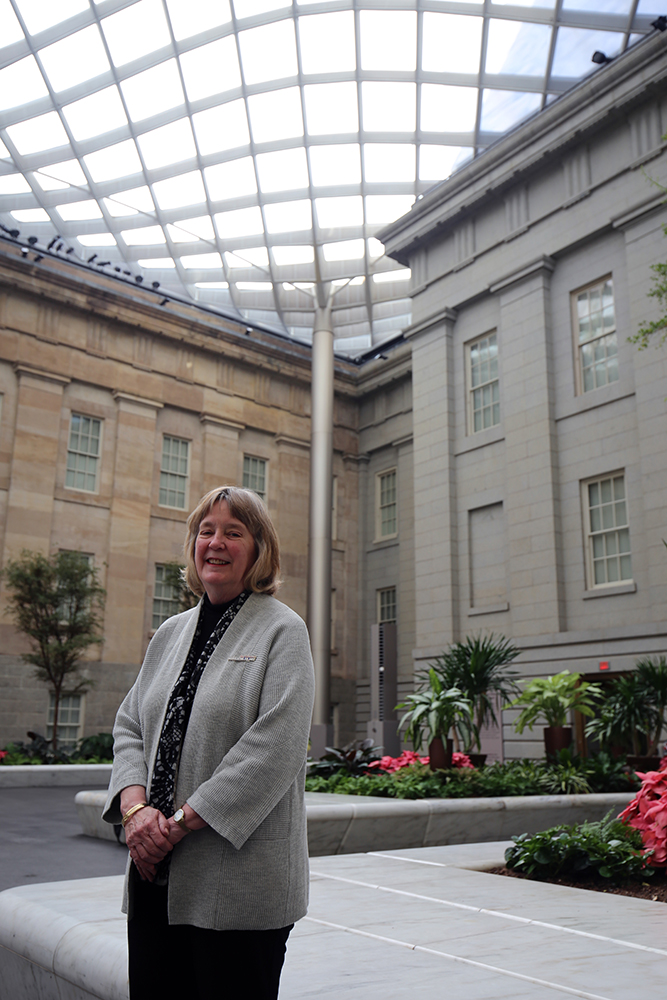
- Broun, standing in the Smithsonian American Art Museum courtyard, in 2016.
- Born: December 15, 1946 (age 79); Kansas City, Missouri, United States
- Occupations: Art historian Curator

Academic background
- Education: University of Kansas
- Thesis: American Paintings and Sculpture in the Fine Arts Building of the World's Columbian Exposition, Chicago, 1893 (1976)
- Influences: Charles C. Eldredge

Academic work
- Discipline: Art history
- Sub-discipline: American art
- Institutions: Spencer Museum of Art; Smithsonian American Art Museum

Elizabeth "Betsy" Broun (born December 15, 1946, in Kansas City) is an American art historian and curator. Broun served as the Margaret and Terry Stent Director of the Smithsonian American Art Museum from 1989 to 2016, and is the longest-serving female director in the history of the Smithsonian Institution.

== Career ==
Born in Kansas City, but raised in Independence, Kansas, Broun completed all of her degrees from the University of Kansas: a Bachelor of Arts in French and art history in 1968, a Master of Arts in art history in 1969, and a Doctor of Philosophy in art history in 1976. Her doctoral dissertation examined American sculptures and paintings at the World's Columbian Exposition in 1893.

In the early 1970s, Broun began her career in museums as a Ford Foundation Curatorial Fellow at the Walters Art Museum. After completing her doctorate, she remained at the University of Kansas as Assistant Professor of Art History, as well as the Curator of Prints and Drawings at the Spencer Museum of Art until 1983. In her final year at the museum, Broun also served as acting director, succeeding Charles C. Eldredge, who went on to become director of the Smithsonian American Art Museum.

In 1983, Broun followed Eldredge to the Smithsonian American Art Museum and became Chief Curator and Assistant Director there. Five years later, she succeeded him and was elevated to Margaret and Terry Stent Director, becoming the first female to serve in that role. Broun held the post until retirement in 2016, making her one of the longest standing directors and the longest serving female director in the history of the Smithsonian Institution. She was succeeded by Stephanie Stebich. Broun oversaw two major museum renovations during her tenure, including the $250 million main building project from 2000 to 2006, and refurbishing the Renwick Gallery from 2013 to 2015. Major exhibitions under her directorship included The West as America (1991) and The Art of Video Games (2012).

In 2017, Broun was elected to the American Academy of Arts and Sciences. Her own curatorial work has concerned artists such as Thomas Hart Benton, Albert Pinkham Ryder, Pat Steir, and Anders Zorn.

In 1991, she received the Alfred H. Barr Jr. Award from the College Art Association for her biography of Albert Pinkham Ryder, published by the Smithsonian Institution Press in 1989.

== Select works ==
- The Prints of Anders Zorn (1979)
- Benton's Bentons: Selections from the Thomas Hart Benton and Rita P. Benton Trusts (1980)
- Form, Illusion, Myth: Prints and Drawings of Pat Steir (1983)
- Images on Stone: Two Centuries of Artists' Lithographs (1987)
- Albert Pinkham Ryder (1989)
- Free Within Ourselves: African-American Artists in the Collection of the National Museum of American Art (1992)

== See also ==
- List of American Academy of Arts and Sciences members (2006–2019)
- List of female art museum directors
- List of people from Kansas City
- List of University of Kansas people

Preceded by Charles C. Eldredge	Director; Spencer Museum of Art; 1982 – 1983	Succeeded by Jay Gates
Preceded by Charles C. Eldredge	Director; Smithsonian American Art Museum; 1989 – 2016	Succeeded by Stephanie Stebich
