= Anne-Imelda Radice =

American art historian

- Born: Anne-Imelda Marino Radice; February 29, 1948 (age 78); Buffalo, New York, United States
- Occupations: Art historian Curator
- Spouse: Stephanie Stebich (m. 2016)

Academic background
- Education: Wheaton College; Dominican University; University of North Carolina at Chapel Hill; American University
- Thesis: Il Cronaca: A Fifteenth-Century Florentine Architect (1976)

Academic work
- Discipline: Art history
- Sub-discipline: American art

Anne-Imelda Marino Radice (born February 29, 1948, in Buffalo) is an American art historian and curator. Radice currently serves as the Management Analyst for the National Endowment for the Humanities.

== Career ==
Born in Buffalo to Lawrence and Anne, Radice earned three art history degrees: a Bachelor of Arts from Wheaton College in 1969, a Master of Arts from Dominican University, and a Doctor of Philosophy from the University of North Carolina at Chapel Hill in 1976, studying abroad at Villa Schifanoia in 1971. Her thesis at Dominican was on the architect Filippo Raguzzini and his works on Sant'Ignazio in Rome. Radice wrote a doctoral dissertation on the architect Simone del Pollaiolo. She then also went on to receive a Master of Business Administration from American University in 1985.

Radice began her curatorial career while a student at Chapel Hill. In 1971, she was hired as assistant curator at the National Gallery of Art. From 1976 to 1981, Radice served as architectural historian in the office of the Architect of the Capitol, and then was promoted to curator until 1985, under George M. White. While there, she was also named the first director of the National Museum of Women in the Arts in 1983, a position that she held until 1989.

From 1989 to 1991, Radice was Chief of the Creative Arts Division of the United States Information Agency, where she supervised the Cultural Property Advisory Committee, appointed by United States Presidents Ronald Reagan and George H. W. Bush. The committee, formed in response to the 1970 UNESCO Convention, promoted long-term measures to safeguard cultural heritage. In the following year, President Bush appointed Radice to serve as the Acting Chairman of the National Endowment for the Arts.

In 1993, Radice left to become a consultant for organizations such as PBS, until 1995. In 1998, Radice became executive director of the Friends of Dresden, Inc., an organization focused on the restoration and preservation of architecture in Dresden. Three years later, she moved on to become executive director of the Appeal of Conscience Foundation.

In 2003, Radice returned to government work by being appointed Chief of Staff for United States Secretary of Education Rod Paige until 2005. That year, she also stepped in as Acting Assistant Chairman for Programs of the National Endowment for the Humanities, and was ultimately appointed Director of the Institute of Museum and Library Services by President George W. Bush, succeeding Robert S. Martin. During her tenure, Radice raised public awareness for conservation, and was recognized with awards from the American Association of Museums, the American Institute for Conservation, and the Presidential Citizens Medal in 2008. Her term ended in 2010.

In 2012, Radice became executive director of the American Folk Art Museum. She would spend a decade there, while simultaneously returning to work for the National Endowment for the Humanities as Director of the Division of Public Programs in 2018. Three years later, she exclusively became the Management Analyst for the Office of the chair, under Shelly Lowe.

== Personal life ==
On August 14, 2016, Radice married fellow art historian and museum director Stephanie Stebich.

== See also ==
- List of American University people
- List of female art museum directors
- List of gay, lesbian or bisexual people: R
- List of people from Buffalo, New York
- List of University of North Carolina at Chapel Hill alumni
- List of Wheaton College (Massachusetts) alumni
