= Stephanie Stebich =

American art historian

- Born: Stephanie Antoinette Franziska Stebich; January 26, 1966 (age 60); Mülheim, West Germany
- Occupations: Art historian Curator
- Spouse: Anne-Imelda Radice (m. 2016)

Academic background
- Education: Columbia University; New York University

Academic work
- Discipline: Art history
- Sub-discipline: American art
- Institutions: Brooklyn Museum; Cleveland Museum of Art; Minneapolis Institute of Art; Tacoma Art Museum; Smithsonian American Art Museum

Stephanie Antoinette Franziska Stebich (born January 26, 1966, in Mülheim) is a German-born American art historian and curator.

== Early life and education ==
Born in West Germany to Gerhard and Ute, Stebich's family immigrated to Scarsdale, New York, when she was three years old. She graduated from Phillips Exeter Academy in 1984. Stebich then continued on to receive degrees in art history: a Bachelor of Arts from Columbia University in 1988 and a Master of Arts from New York University Institute of Fine Arts.

== Career ==
Stebich began her career in museum directorship in assistant director positions:

- Brooklyn Museum from 1992 to 1995
- Cleveland Museum of Art from 1995 to 2001
- Minneapolis Institute of Art from 2001 to 2004.

In 2005, she became executive director of the Tacoma Art Museum.

In 2017, Stebich was named the Margaret and Terry Stent Director of the Smithsonian American Art Museum, succeeding Elizabeth Broun.

In 2024, Stebich was appointed the first executive director of the Boris Lurie Art Foundation.

== Personal life ==
On August 14, 2016, Stebich married fellow art historian and museum director Anne-Imelda Radice.

== See also ==
- List of Columbia College people
- List of female art museum directors
- List of gay, lesbian or bisexual people: Sj–Sz
- List of New York University alumni
- List of Phillips Exeter Academy people
- List of people from Scarsdale, New York

Preceded by Janeanne Upp	Executive Director; Tacoma Art Museum; 2005 – 2017	Succeeded by David F. Setford
Preceded by Elizabeth Broun	Director; Smithsonian American Art Museum; 2017 – 2024	Succeeded by Jane Carpenter-Rock
