= Caroline Haven Ober =

Argentinian school regent

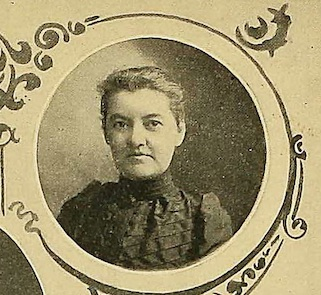
Caroline Haven Ober

Caroline Haven Ober (May 3, 1866 – June 2, 1929) was regent and vice-directress of the Normal School in Argentina and founded the department of Romance languages at the University of Washington.

== Early life ==
Ober was born on May 3, 1866, in Beverly, Massachusetts, the daughter of Andrew Kimball Ober (1825-1893) and Sarah A. Hadlock Ober (1828-1901).

Ober attended Wheaton Seminary and graduated from Massachusetts Normal School, Salem, in 1884.

== Career ==
Ober taught at Wheaton Seminary from 1884 to 1886 and then in Palisade, Nevada, public schools from 1886 to 1888. She was instructor in modern languages at Bozeman Academy, Montana, from 1888 to 1889, and at Trinidad High School, Colorado, from 1894 to 1895. She also taught in Beverly and Omaha, Nebraska. She was instructor of Spanish at San Diego High School, California, from 1896 to 1897.

From 1897, she was a professor of romance languages at the University of Washington, and became professor emeritus. She was Regent and Vice-Directress of Government Normal Schools in Argentina from 1889 to 1893.

She was a member of American Association of Teachers of Spanish, Washington Education Association, National Education Association, China Club of Seattle, Association of University Instructors, Modern Language Association, Faculty Women's Club, American Philological Association, and the Alumnae Association of Wheaton College.

Ober founded the department of romance languages at the University of Washington and became its head. She retired in 1929 and died after just one month.

She was interested in supervising the education of many Chinese boys studying in the United States. She investigated educational conditions in China and Japan. She was charter member and vice-president of the Association for the Promotion of Education of the People of India.

== Personal life ==
Ober moved to Washington in 1897 and lived at 4558 Thackeray Place, Seattle, Washington. Before that she lived in Nevada, Montana, Colorado, California and Argentina.

She died on June 2, 1929, and is buried at Lake View Cemetery, Seattle, Washington.

== Legacy ==
The Caroline Haven Ober papers, 1897-1929 are preserved at University of Washington Libraries, Special Collections.
