= Charles Hartwell =

American missionary to China (1825–1905)

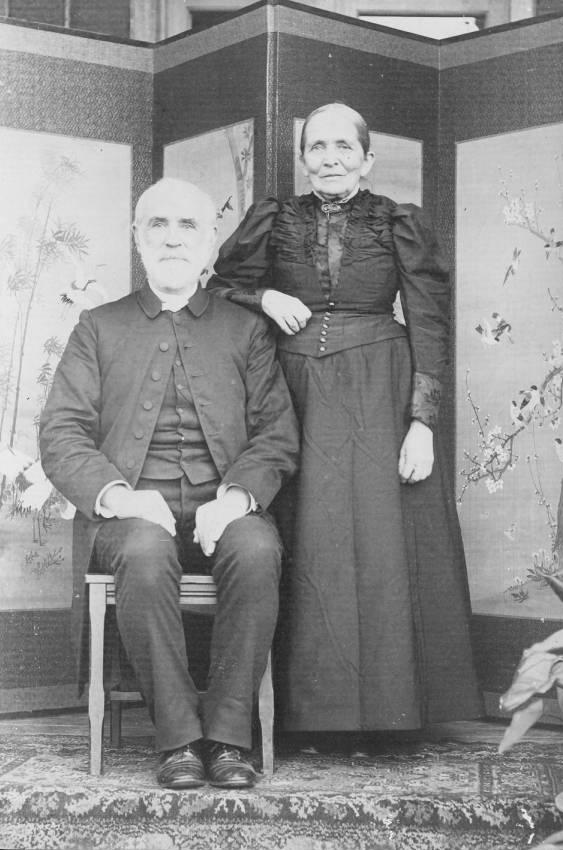
- Rev. and Mrs. Charles Hartwell in Fuzhou, ca. 1902
- Born: December 19, 1825; Lincoln, Massachusetts, United States
- Died: January 30, 1905 (aged 79); Fuzhou, China

Charles Hartwell (Chinese: 夏察理; Pinyin: Xià Chálǐ; Foochow Romanized: Hâ Chák-lī; December 19, 1825 – January 30, 1905) was an American Board missionary to Fuzhou, China in the second half of the 19th century.

== Life and work ==
Hartwell was born in Lincoln, Massachusetts, on December 19, 1825, and was fitted for college at Westford Academy in Westford, Massachusetts. After teaching several months at West Killingly, Hartwell studied theology at Amherst College in 1849, and received the degree of Master of Arts from the same institution three years later. He was ordained at Lincoln, Massachusetts, on October 13, 1852, entered the service of the ABCFM, embarked for China on November 3, and reached Hong Kong on April 16, 1853. Hartwell was located at Fuzhou on June 9, 1853, and was engaged in missionary work there for the rest of his life, with only three visits to the United States: 1865–67, 1877–78, and 1890–91, in all, four years.

Hartwell ranked high as a sinologist. He spoke the Fuzhou dialect with fluency, and was one of the proposers of the romanization of that dialect. In addition to preaching the Gospel, he translated one fourth of the New Testament into the Fuzhou colloquial, composed the Three Character and the Four Character Classics in the same dialect, and various tracts and books (including the 2nd edition of the Dictionary of the Foochow Dialect). He also prepared many textbooks for schools (including one series of the so-called Hongkong Readers), wrote a book on Meteorology, and contributed articles on temperance to English and American journals.

The fiftieth anniversary of Hartwell's arrival at Fuzhou was celebrated on May 26, 1903, a full account of which was issued from the Foochow Mission Press in February, 1904, in a volume entitled Jubilee Notes.

Hartwell was married twice during his life. On September 6, 1852, he married his first wife Lucy E. Stearns, who died July 10, 1883, in Fuzhou. In 1885 he married his second wife Hannah Louisa Plimpton Peet Hartwell. Hartwell died of heart failure in Fuzhou on January 30, 1905. At the time of his death he was the senior missionary of the American Board in China. His wife died 3 years afterwards. His daughter, Emily Susan Hartwell, remained in the field until 1937.

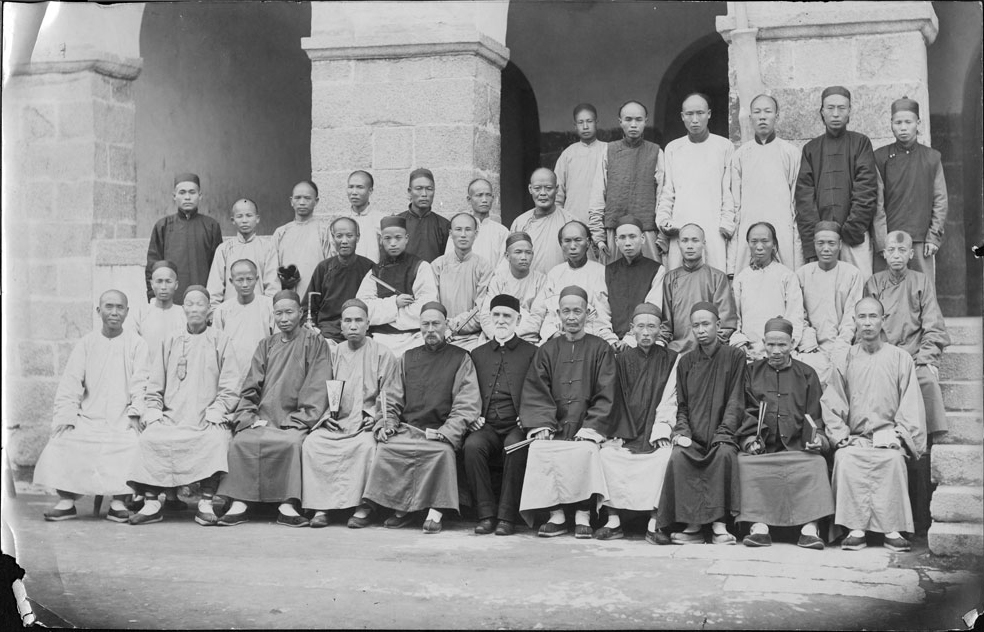
Rev. Charles Hartwell with Chinese preachers and booksellers, 1900

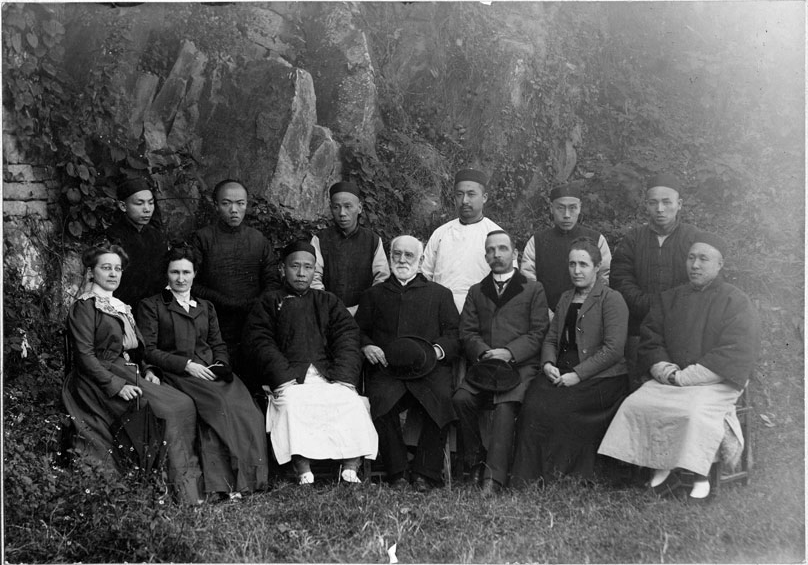
Charles Hartwell with Foochow College faculty, 1903

== References and further reading ==
- Wilcox, Myron C (April 1905), "In Memoriam: Rev. Charles Hartwell, M.A.", The Chinese Recorder, 36: 190–194
