= Lori Baker =

American novelist and short story writer (born 1962)

Lori Baker (born 1962) is an American novelist and short story writer. She has earned degrees from Wheaton College, Brown University and Boston College. Her books include: The Glass Ocean (Penguin Press, 2013; Virago, 2013); Crash & Tell: Stories (LSU Press, 2011); Crazy Water: Six Fictions (NYU Press, 1996); and Scraps (paradigm press, 1995). Crazy Water received the Mamdouha S. Bobst Prize for Emerging Fiction.

Critical responses to Baker's work have been generous. Man Booker Prize-winning novelist John Banville wrote, "The Glass Ocean is that rarest of things, a historical novel, or at least a novel set in history, that is also a work of art. Lori Baker is a captivating storyteller, and her prose has the flash and fire of molten glass." Other praise for the novel has come from Clare Clark, Bill Goldstein, and novelist Thomas Pynchon. According to WorldCat, the book is held in 706 libraries.

Along with her writing, Baker is part of the International Writers Project steering committee at Brown University, a project founded in 2003; each year, the IWP brings one visiting fellow to Brown for the academic year. The fellow is a prominent or emerging literary writer who has faced serious difficulties because of her or his writing (such as severe harassment, censorship, imprisonment, death threats). The project was founded by the novelist Robert Coover, and is currently overseen by Baker, Erik Ehn and Gale Nelson.
