= Emily Susan Hartwell =

American Congregationalist missionary (1859–1951)

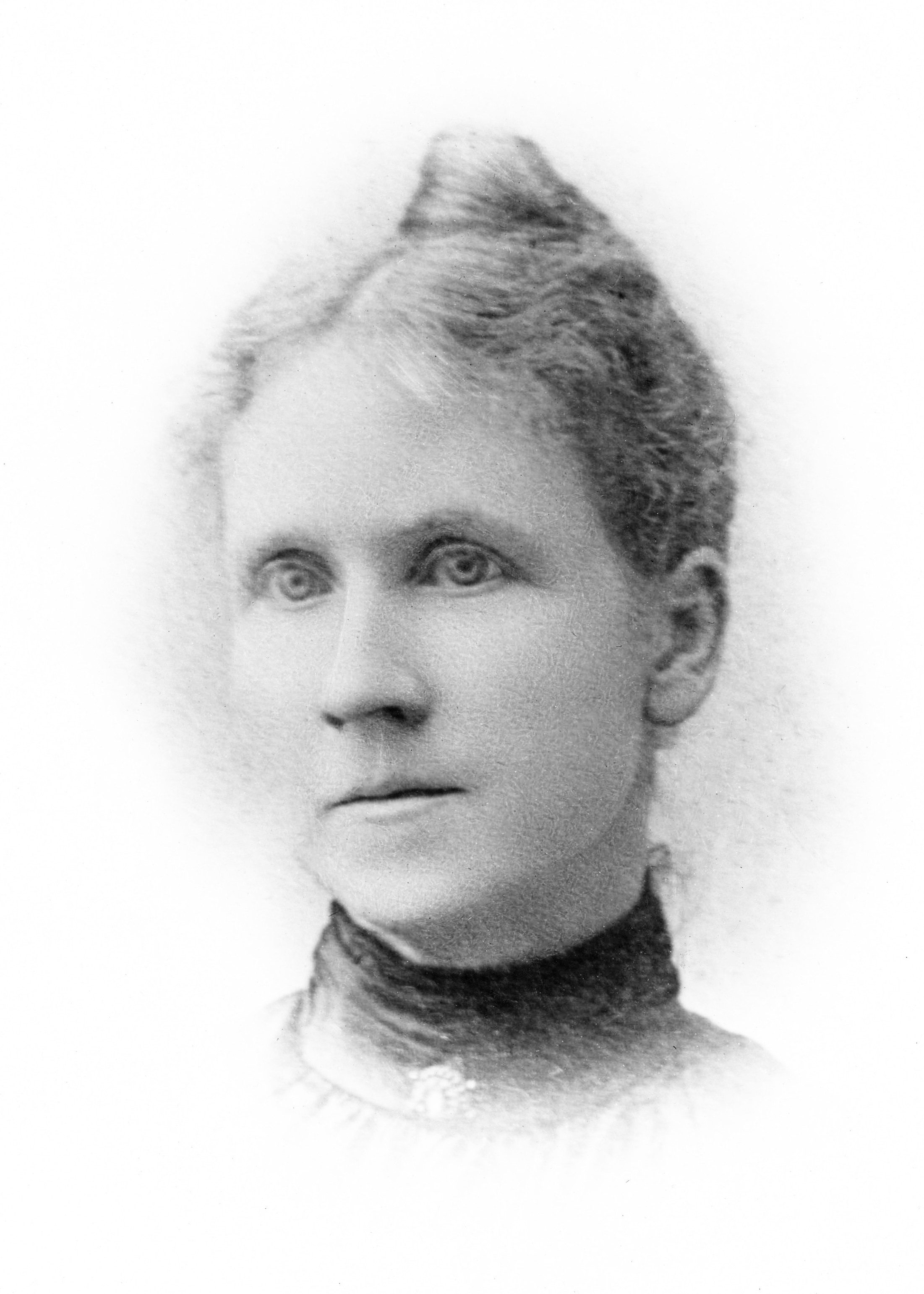
- Missionary to China
- Born: April 16, 1859; Fuzhou, Qing China
- Died: October 2, 1951 (aged 92); Oberlin, Ohio, United States

Emily Susan Hartwell (Chinese: 夏咏美; Pinyin: Xià Yǒngměi; Foochow Romanized: Hâ Īng-mī; April 16, 1859 – October 2, 1951) was a Congregational Christian educational missionary and philanthropist in Fuzhou, China under the American Board of Foreign Missions.

== Life ==
Miss Emily S. Hartwell was the daughter of Lucy E. Stearns and Charles Hartwell (夏察理), who were the pioneering Congregational missionaries stationed in Fuzhou. She graduated from Wheaton College in 1883 and taught there before her mother died in Fuzhou and she returned as a missionary.

She started a girls' school at Ponasang (保福山) and for 20 years she taught English at Foochow College (福州格致书院). When Fuzhou was inundated by a flood in 1900 Miss Hartwell organized relief work. She also founded an orphanage named the Christian Herald Fukien Industrial Homes (福建孤儿院) at Ado (下渡). After the fall of the Qing Dynasty in 1911 she raised funds to aid the stranded and starving Manchus in Fuzhou. Other charitable institutions established by her included the Union Kindergarten Training School, the Christian Women's Industrial Institute, and the Dr. Cordelia A. Green Memorial Home.

Miss Hartwell received the Order of Golden Grain from the president of the Fujian Provincial Government. She was evacuated from Fuzhou in 1937 during the Sino-Japanese War, and died in Oberlin, Ohio in 1951.
