= Seychelles–United States relations =

- Seychelles: United States

Seychelles–United States relations are bilateral relations between Seychelles and the United States.

== History ==
The year 1963 marked the beginning of an official U.S. presence in Seychelles when the U.S. Air Force Tracking Station was built and put into operation on Mahé. The USAF Tracking Station facilities were situated on land that was leased from the Seychelles Government ($4.5 million annually).

The station's complement consisted of five uniformed Air Force personnel (two officers and three sergeants), 65 employees of Loral Corporation and Johnson Instruments, and 150 Seychellois employees. The USAF Tracking Station officially closed down on September 30, 1996. Peace Corps Volunteers served in Seychelles between 1974 and 1995.

A U.S. consulate was opened in May 1976 and became an embassy after Seychelles' independence in June 1976. The embassy was subsequently closed in August 1996, and the United States opened a consular agency on September 2, 1996, to provide services to residents of Seychelles. The U.S. embassy was reopened in Victoria in June 2023.

In the 2010 United States diplomatic cables leak a 2009 cable revealed that US drones carried out missions over Somalia and the Horn of Africa from the Seychelles. (see United States drone base in Seychelles) According to Seychelles officials the drones also track pirates in regional waters.

== See also ==
- Foreign relations of Seychelles
- Foreign relations of the United States
