= Jérémie Bonnelame =

Seychellois political figure and diplomat

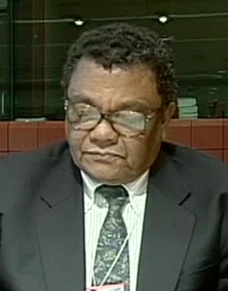
Bonnelame in 2003

Jérémie Émile Patrick Bonnelame (born October 24, 1938) is a Seychellois political figure and diplomat. He was Secretary-General of the Indian Ocean Commission from 1993 to 1997, Minister of Foreign Affairs from 1997 to 2005, and was the Permanent Representative of the Seychelles to the United Nations from 2005 to 2007. He was the Chairman of the Constitutional Appointment Authority from July 2007 to July 2014(CAA).

== Life and career ==
Bonnelame was born on Mahé Island in the Seychelles. He worked as a teacher at the Modern Secondary School of Seychelles from 1967 to 1975, as well as Editor-in-Chief of L'Écho des Îles, a Catholic monthly. He was subsequently Director-General of Information from 1978 to 1979, then Principal Secretary in the Ministry of Education from 1979 to 1980, Principal Secretary in the Ministry of External Relations from 1981 to 1983, and Principal Secretary in the Ministry of Education and Information from 1983 to 1986.

He entered the government as Minister of Manpower in 1986, serving in that position until 1988; he was then Minister of Transport from 1988 to 1989 and Minister of Agriculture and Fisheries from 1989 to 1993. He was not included in the government named on August 3, 1993 and was instead appointed as Secretary-General of the Indian Ocean Commission in the same year. He remained in that post until he returned to the Seychellois government as Minister of Foreign Affairs in August 1997.

Bonnelame was replaced as Foreign Minister in February 2005 and was instead nominated as Permanent Representative of the Seychelles to the United Nations and Ambassador to a number of countries, including the United States, by President James Michel. The National Assembly approved the nomination on March 1. Presenting the motion for its approval, Leader of Government Business Patrick Herminie noted Bonnelame's extensive experience as a politician and diplomat; the opposition chose to abstain from the vote, acknowledging that Bonnelame was qualified for the post but questioning the selection of a man of Bonnelame's age, expressing the view that a younger person would be more suitable. Bonnelame presented his credentials as Permanent Representative on May 13, 2005; he also presented his credentials as Ambassador to the United States in May and presented his credentials as High Commissioner to Canada on June 7.

In mid-2007, Bonnelame was appointed as Chairman of the Constitutional Appointment Authority (CAA); he was replaced by Ronald Jumeau as Permanent Representative to the UN and as Ambassador to the US. In April 2008, Bonnelame was additionally appointed by President Michel as a member of a constitutional review commission.
