= List of diplomatic missions in Seychelles =

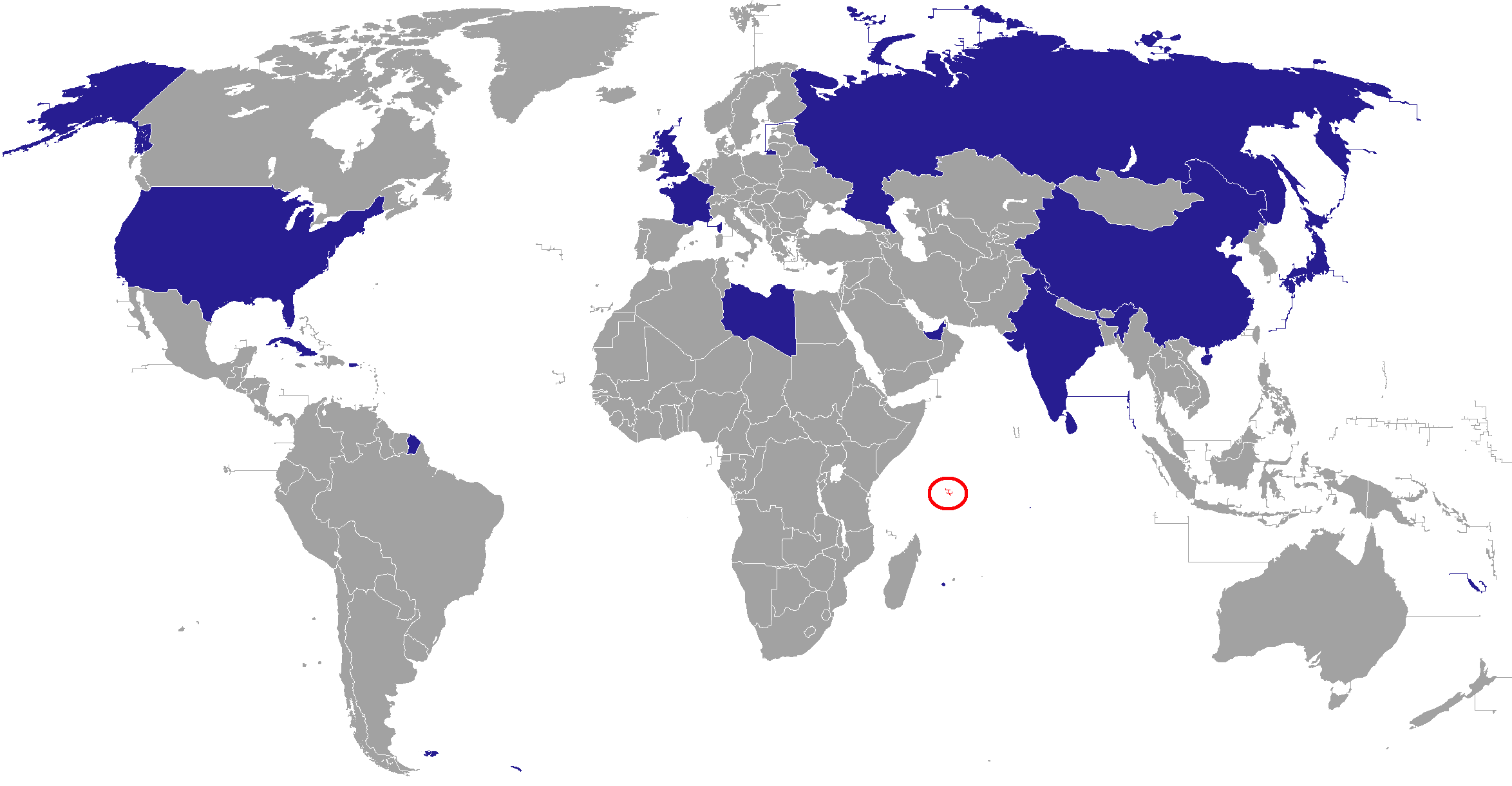
Diplomatic missions in Seychelles

This is a list of diplomatic missions in Seychelles.

As of 2024, the capital city of Victoria hosts 12 embassies and high commissions. Several other countries have ambassadors accredited to Seychelles, with a plurality being resident in Nairobi.

== Embassies/High Commissions in Victoria ==
Entries marked with an asterisk (*) are member-states of the Commonwealth of Nations. As such, their embassies are formally termed as "high commissions".

1. China
2. Cuba
3. France
4. India*
5. Japan
6. Libya
7. Russia
8. Sri Lanka
9. Sovereign Military Order of Malta
10. United Arab Emirates
11. United Kingdom*
12. United States

== Non-resident embassies/high commissions accredited to Seychelles ==
=== Resident in Addis Ababa, Ethiopia ===
1. Bulgaria
2. Czechia
3. Djibouti
4. Equatorial Guinea
5. Georgia
6. Kazakhstan
7. New Zealand
8. Serbia
9. South Korea
10. Spain
11. Tunisia
12. Ukraine

=== Resident in Antananarivo, Madagascar ===
1. Algeria
2. Comoros
3. Holy See
4. Indonesia
5. Iran
6. Switzerland

=== Resident in Dar es Salaam, Tanzania ===
1. Angola
2. Brazil
3. Canada
4. Ireland
5. Kenya
6. Kuwait
7. Malawi
8. Oman
9. Palestine
10. Rwanda

=== Resident in Maputo, Mozambique ===
1. Botswana
2. Eswatini
3. Portugal
4. Vietnam

=== Resident in Nairobi, Kenya ===
1. Argentina
2. Austria
3. Belgium
4. Denmark
5. Egypt
6. Ethiopia
7. Finland
8. Germany
9. Greece
10. Hungary
11. Israel
12. Italy
13. Mexico
14. Netherlands
15. Nigeria
16. Norway
17. Philippines
18. Poland
19. Qatar
20. Romania
21. Saudi Arabia
22. Slovakia
23. Sweden
24. Tanzania
25. Thailand
26. Turkey
27. Uganda
28. Zambia

=== Resident in Port Louis, Mauritius ===
1. Australia
2. Bangladesh
3. Madagascar
4. Pakistan
5. South Africa

=== Resident in Pretoria, South Africa ===
1. Burundi
2. Colombia
3. Croatia
4. Ghana
5. Guinea
6. Ivory Coast
7. Mali
8. Mauritania
9. Mozambique
10. Namibia
11. Paraguay
12. Senegal
13. Togo
14. Zimbabwe

=== Resident elsewhere ===
1. Bahrain (Abu Dhabi)
2. Cyprus (Muscat)
3. Lebanon (Libreville)
4. Iceland (Reykjavík)
5. Malaysia (Harare)
6. Maldives (Colombo)
