= Ronald Jumeau =

Seychellois political figure and diplomat

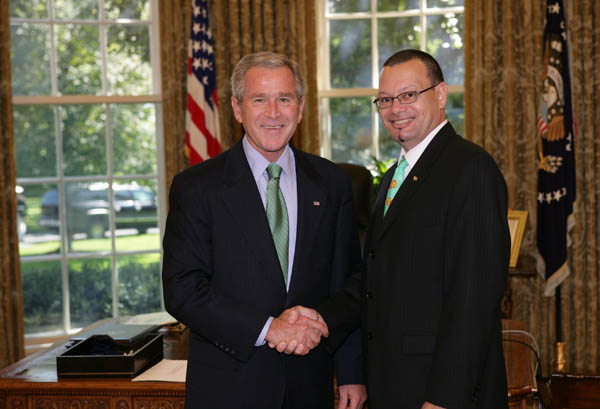
Ambassador Ronald Jumeau meets with George W. Bush in 2007.

Ronald Jean Jumeau (born January 24, 1957) is a Seychellois political figure and diplomat. He is currently the New York-based roving Ambassador for Climate Change and Small Island Developing State Issues of the Republic of Seychelles since 2012. Previously, Ambassador Jumeau has held various ministerial positions in the government from 1998 to 2007, and adopted the role of Permanent Representative of the Seychelles to the United Nations and Ambassador to the United States from 2007 to 2012 and again from 2017 to 2021.

== Biography ==
Jumeau was born in Dar es Salaam, Tanzania. He attended secondary school at Seychelles College, from which he graduated in 1975. Early in his career he was a journalist; from 1978 – 1980 as a Reporter for the Government Information Services and as the Editor of Seychelles Agence Presse and the Seychelles Nation daily newspaper from 1980 to 1993. Subsequently, he was an adviser with special press duties at the Ministry of Education from 1991 to 1993, and he was Secretary to the Cabinet in the office of the President of Seychelles and at the same time secretary of four inter-ministerial Cabinet committees from 1994 to 1998; additionally, Jumeau was in charge of the government's relations with the National Assembly from 1995 to 1998.

In 1992 and 1993, Jumeau was a member of the delegation of the ruling Seychelles People's Progressive Front (SPPF) to the first and second Seychelles Constitutional Commissions. Since 1995, he has been a member of the Central Committee of the SPPF. Jumeau was Minister for Agriculture and Marine Resources from 1998 to 1999, then Minister for Culture and Information from 2000 to September 2001, Minister for the Environment from September 2001 to 2003, and Minister for the Environment and Natural Resources (i.e. agriculture and marine resources) from 2003 to 2007. He was appointed as Permanent Representative to the UN in 2007, presenting his credentials on August 23, 2007; he was also appointed as Ambassador to the United States, presenting his credentials on September 18, 2007. For his second term as Permanent Representative to the UN he presented his credentials to the UN on May 3 2017 and for his second term as Ambassador to the United States he presented his credentials on September 8, 2017

Amb. Jumeau was posted to New York in 2007 as Seychelles’ Permanent Representative to the United Nations and Ambassador to the United States, Canada, Brazil and several Caribbean islands until 2012. He has been Chair of the Steering Committee of the Global Island Partnership since 2013 and Chief Spokesperson of the Alliance of Small Island States (AOSIS) since 2012. Jumeau is the AOSIS Island Champion for the United Nations International Year of Small Island Developing States (IYSIDS) representing the AIMS region (Atlantic, Indian Ocean, Mediterranean and South China Sea)
