= Endangered Species (Warhol series) =

1983 series of prints by Andy Warhol

- Artist: Andy Warhol
- Year: 1983
- Catalogue: F&S II.293–302
- Medium: Screenprints in colors on Lenox Museum Board
- Movement: Pop Art
- Dimensions: 96.5 cm × 96.5 cm (38.0 in × 38.0 in)

Endangered Species is a portfolio of ten screenprints created by American artist Andy Warhol in 1983. Commissioned by art dealer Ronald Feldman, the series depicts endangered animals, including the bald eagle, Siberian tiger, giant panda, and African elephant. The portfolio departed from Warhol's established emphasis on celebrities, consumer products, and popular culture, using his signature Pop art aesthetic of vivid colors and high-contrast compositions to draw attention to wildlife conservation. The prints were published in an edition of 150, with additional artist's proofs. Warhol donated ten complete sets to wildlife conservation organizations.

== Background ==
Endangered Species was the second animal-themed series created by American Pop artist Andy Warhol, following Cats and Dogs (1976). The series originated in conversations between Warhol and New York art dealer Ronald Feldman about environmental issues, including beach erosion and endangered wildlife. Feldman and his wife, Frayda Feldman, subsequently proposed that Warhol create a portfolio devoted to threatened animals, an idea he embraced because of his longstanding interest in animals and his desire to draw public attention to their plight. It also marked the 10th anniversary of the Endangered Species Act of 1973.

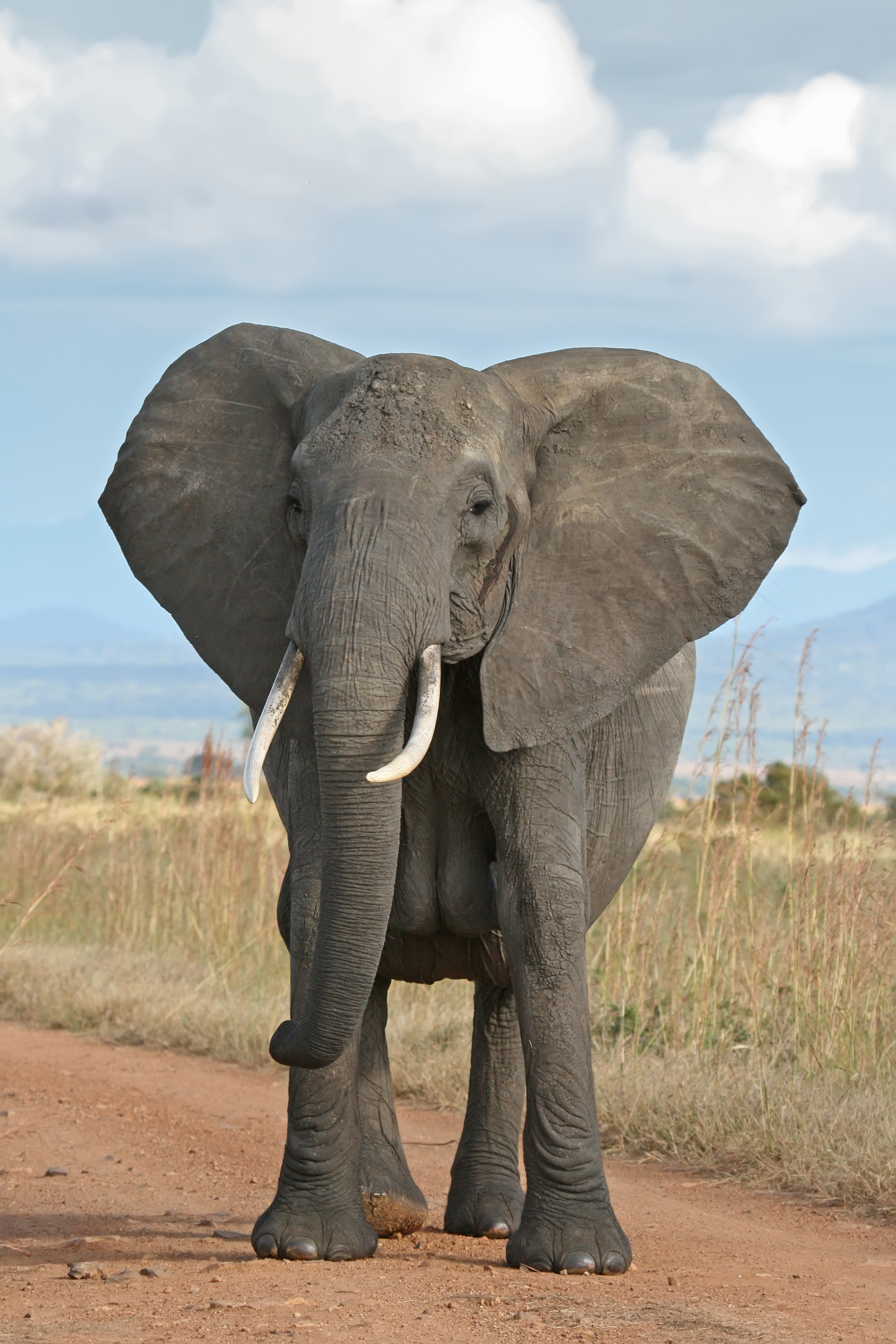
African Elephant

The portfolio depicts ten endangered or threatened species: the Pine Barrens tree frog, Southern bald eagle, Siberian tiger, orangutan, Grévy's zebra, black rhinoceros, African elephant, Callippe silverspot butterfly, giant panda, and bighorn sheep. The animals were selected to represent species threatened by habitat destruction, hunting, commercial exploitation, and other human activities.

Produced in 1983, Endangered Species is a departure from Warhol's traditional focus on celebrities, consumer products, and mass-media imagery. Instead, he transformed endangered animals into Pop art subjects, using bold colors and dramatic compositions to emphasize their visual appeal and cultural visibility. Warhol explained, "I think animals are celebrities, too. Look how many millions of people run to the circus each year just to look at the animals." He also remarked, "Animals are beautiful, just beautiful. I loved painting them."

Three years later, in 1986, Warhol produced sixteen additional prints for Vanishing Animals, a book created with Kurt Benirschke, an animal pathologist and former director of research at the San Diego Zoo. The project continued Warhol's engagement with wildlife conservation and served as a call to protect the world's endangered species.

== Production ==
Pine Barrens Tree Frog

Giant Panda

Based on images taken by other photographers, Warhol transformed the animals into stylized Pop icons through the use of highly saturated, often unnatural colors. He created the silkscreen images by tracing and enlarging photographic sources, superimposing his drawings onto the photographs, and layering them with vivid, psychedelic hues, producing a surreal, almost synthetic effect. The animals are rendered with the same electric palette and hand-drawn linear accents that characterized Warhol's celebrity portraits.

Warhol denied any symbolic meaning behind his unconventional color choices, explaining to the Daily News in 1983: "There's no reason I painted a panda red or an elephant pink. I just used colors I liked." He added, "I just used colors I liked. I looked at a lot of Audubon paintings before I started and probably got some ideas on color from them." In another interview, Warhol elaborated: "Audubon did such a good job [painting birds], I knew I couldn't do a better job. So I just thought I'd be more colorful."

== Description ==
Bald Eagle

The portfolio consists of 10 screenprints in colors on Lenox Museum Board, each measuring approximately 38 × 38 inches (96.5 × 96.5 cm). Thin strokes of contrasting hues emphasize the animals' features and heighten their graphic intensity.

The prints were published by Ronald Feldman Fine Arts, Inc., New York, and printed by Rupert Jasen Smith. The portfolio was issued in an edition of 150 numbered sets, in addition to 30 artist's proofs. Warhol also donated 10 complete portfolios to wildlife conservation organizations to support fundraising efforts.

== Portfolio ==
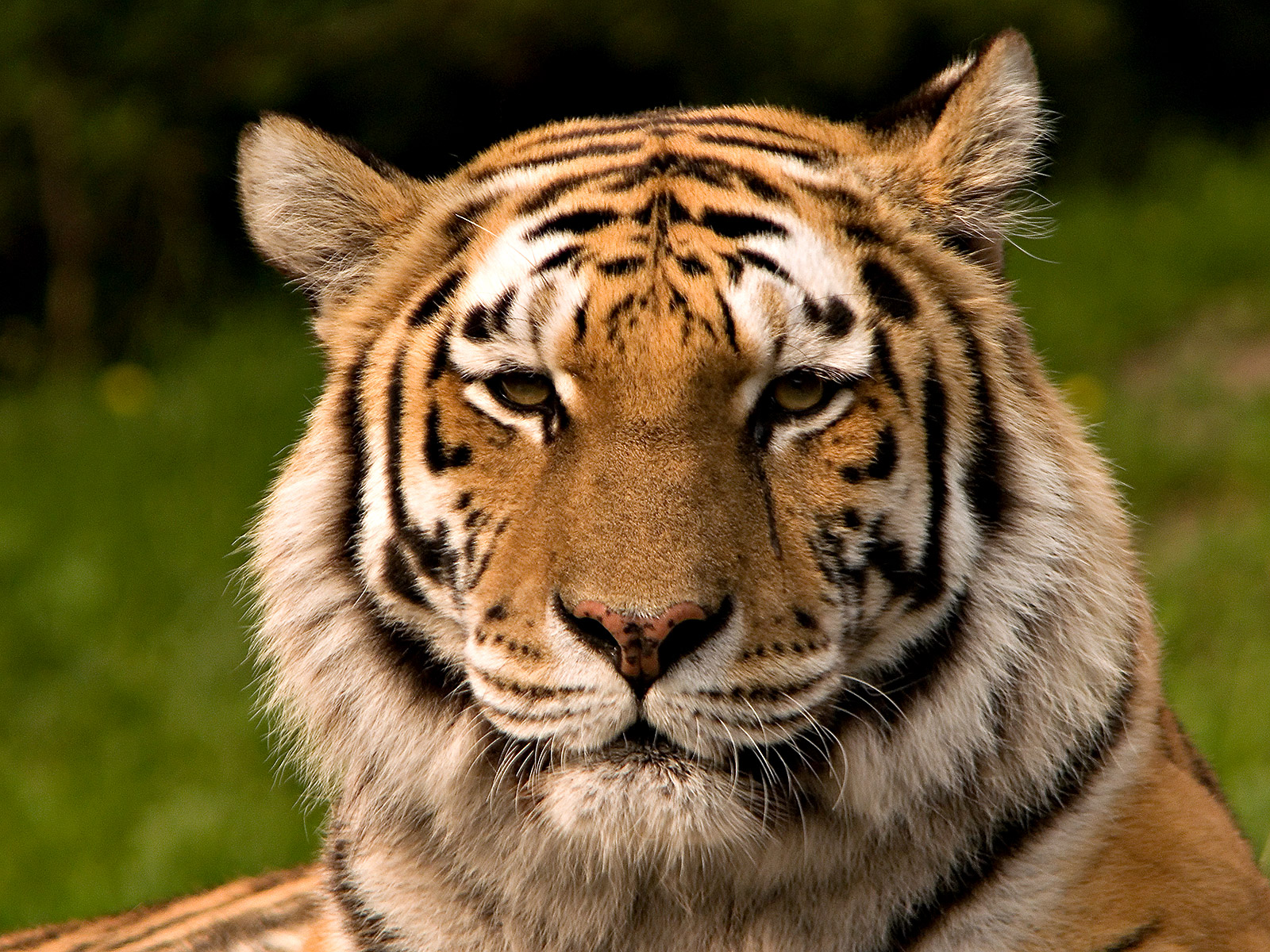
Siberian tiger

San Francisco silverspot butterfly

The portfolio is catalogued as Feldman & Schellmann II.293–302.

No.	Work	Catalogue raisonné
1	African Elephant	F&S II.293
2	Pine Barrens Tree Frog	F&S II.294
3	Giant Panda	F&S II.295
4	Bald Eagle	F&S II.296
5	Siberian Tiger	F&S II.297
6	San Francisco Silverspot	F&S II.298
7	Orangutan	F&S II.299
8	Grevy's Zebra	F&S II.300
9	Black Rhinoceros	F&S II.301
10	Bighorn Ram	F&S II.302

== Interpretation ==
Orangutan

Endangered Species is an unusual departure from Warhol's predominantly based on "cultural artifacts." As noted in the Andy Warhol Prints: A Catalogue Raisonné, "When he had used nature subjects in the past (as in Flowers and Sunsets), the images purposefully had been pushed over the edge from the real to the artificial and transformed into pure design. With Endangered Species however, the content is crucial to their success." Warhol's vivid colors made the animals "irresistibly appealing," reinforcing the "environmentalist message" that was the "raison d'être for the series."

Although the prints lack some of the ambiguity characteristic of Warhol's earlier work, "they have a directness that is captivating and entirely appropriate for the thematic issue with which he was dealing." The portfolio also demonstrates Warhol's increasing technical sophistication, with prints requiring as many as nine screens and fourteen colors. This approach to printmaking is reflective of the "polished style" of the 1980s.

== Exhibitions ==
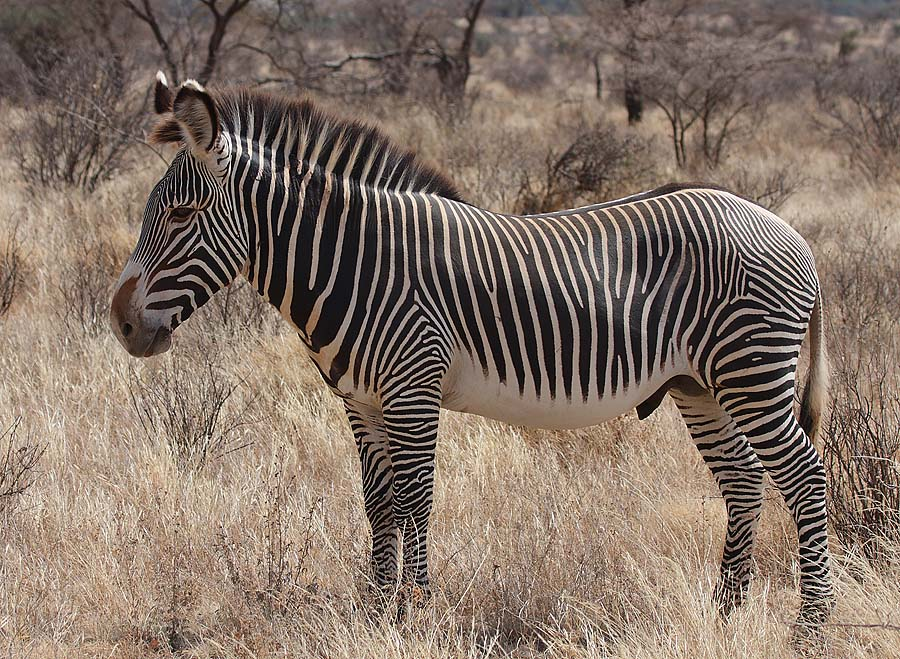
Grevy's zebra

The Endangered Species portfolio was first exhibited in Warhol's Animals: Species at Risk at the American Museum of Natural History in New York City from April 12 to May 8, 1983. The exhibition was presented in the Corning Gallery at the Cleveland Museum of Natural History in Cleveland from April 18 to June 30, 1983. From April 25 to May 8, the portfolio was also displayed at the Washington Park Zoo in Portland, Oregon.

Black rhinoceros

On May 21–22, 1983, the Greater Los Angeles Zoo Association presented its fourth annual Botanical and Wildlife Art Show at the Los Angeles Zoo. The exhibition featured the first Los Angeles presentation of Warhol's Endangered Species.

Endangered Species was the inaugural exhibition at Eastern Washington University's Higher Education Center gallery in Spokane, Washington from September 16 to October 28, 1983.

Prints from Endangered Species, together with Warhol's Ten Portraits of Jews of the Twentieth Century (1980) and Myths (1981), were featured in Andy Warhol in the '80s at the Aldrich Contemporary Art Museum in Ridgefield, Connecticut, from September 25 to December 31, 1983.

Bighorn Ram

The portfolio was also exhibited at Govinda Gallery in Washington, D.C., in Endangered Species from November 18 to December 31, 1983, and at the American National Bank in Kennewick, Washington, from December 12 to 23, 1983.

In 1985, Endangered Species was exhibited at the Delaware Art Museum in Wilmington, Delaware, from July 8 to August 7. It was subsequently shown with Warhol's Ads (1985) portfolio in Ads and Endangered Species at the Kilcawley Center Art Gallery in Youngstown, Ohio, from September 25 to October 19.

The portfolio was later exhibited at the Hudson River Museum in Yonkers, New York, in Andy Warhol: Endangered Species from July 16 to September 12, 1999. It was also presented at the Ackland Art Museum in Chapel Hill, North Carolina, in Endangered Species from October 29, 2000, to January 21, 2001.

In recognition of the 50th anniversary of the Endangered Species Act of 1973, the High Desert Museum in Oregon presented Andy Warhol's Endangered Species: From the Collections of Jordan D. Schnitzer and his Family Foundation from December 2023 through April 2024. The exhibition featured the complete Endangered Species portfolio, along with selected works from Warhol's Skulls (1976) and Vanishing Animals (1986) series and a portrait of Marilyn Monroe.

== Critical reception ==
Maryfran Johnson of the Tri-City Herald praised the "striking portraits" that Warhol created "to draw attention to the plight of endangered species."

Kevin Coughlin of The News compared the animals to Warhol's celebrity portraits, writing, "Like Warhol's Marilyn Monroe, these animals are reduced to transitory pop stars. The colors aren't real, and soon, neither will the animals be, as man renders them casualties of his cool greed and callous indifference."

Michael Schmeltzer of The Spokesman-Review described the works as "striking and technically well executed," but argued that the polished aesthetic threatened to overshadow the artist's apparent sensitivity to the subject. Nevertheless, Schmeltzer singled out the Siberian tiger and black rhinoceros as the exhibition's "strongest, most exciting pieces," writing that Warhol captured "the beauty, the strength and the dignity of these creatures and helps us also to see their frailties."

== Collections ==
Several prints from the portfolio are held in museum collections, including the Andy Warhol Museum in Pittsburgh. Warhol donated a complete set to the American Museum of Natural History in New York, which was sold to benefit the museum.

In 1983, a complete set was donated to the Cleveland Metroparks Zoo by Jared and Elizabeth Faub in memory of their daughter, Susan. That year, Eastern Washington University in Spokane purchased a portfolio for their permanent collection.

== Art market ==
In 1983, prints from the Endangered Species portfolio sold for approximately $15,000 each. Since then, the works have appreciated considerably in value, with complete portfolios and individual prints regularly appearing at auction.

In November 2012, the print Endangered Species: San Francisco Silverspot, numbered 'PA29.007,' sold for $1,258,500 at Christie's in New York. In that same auction, Endangered Species: Bighorn Ram, numbered 'PA29.008,' sold for $842,500.

Inn November 2014, the set Engendered Species, signed and numbered 'T.P. 16/30' (trial proof), sold for $1,265,000 at Christie's in New York.

In March 2021, the set Engendered Species, each signed and numbered 125/150, sold for £2,919,000 at Sotheby's in London.

In October 2022, the set Engendered Species, each signed and numbered 91/150, sold for $3,075,000 at Sotheby's in New York.

In November 2023, the set Engendered Species, each signed and numbered 83/150, sold for $3,438,000 at Christie's in New York.

In April 2024, the print Siberian Tiger, signed and inscribed AP 5/30 (artist's proof), sold for $304,800 at Sotheby's in New York.

In November 2024, the set Engendered Species, each signed and numbered 126/150, sold for $4,320,000 at Sotheby's in New York.

In May 2026, the set Engendered Species, signed and numbered 'Andy Warhol TP 14/30' (trial proof), sold for $4,467,000 at Christie's in New York.
