= Benirschke =

Benirschke is a surname. Notable people with the surname include:

- Kurt Benirschke (1924–2018), German-American pathologist and geneticist
- Rolf Benirschke (born 1955), American football player
