= Moonwalk (Warhol) =

1987 series of prints by Andy Warhol

- Artist: Andy Warhol
- Year: 1987
- Catalogue: F&S II.404–405
- Medium: Screenprints in colors on Lenox Museum Board
- Movement: Pop Art
- Dimensions: 96.2 cm × 96.3 cm (37.9 in × 37.9 in)

Moonwalk is a pair of screenprints created by American artist Andy Warhol in 1987. It depicts the Apollo 11 moon landing in 1969. Warhol combined two photographs taken by astronaut Neil Armstrong of Buzz Aldrin and the American flag on the surface of the moon. The prints were part of a planned portfolio of ten screenprints titled TV, conceived with New York art dealer Ronald Feldman, intended to trace the history of American television through iconic images in pop culture, sports, and politics.

== Background ==
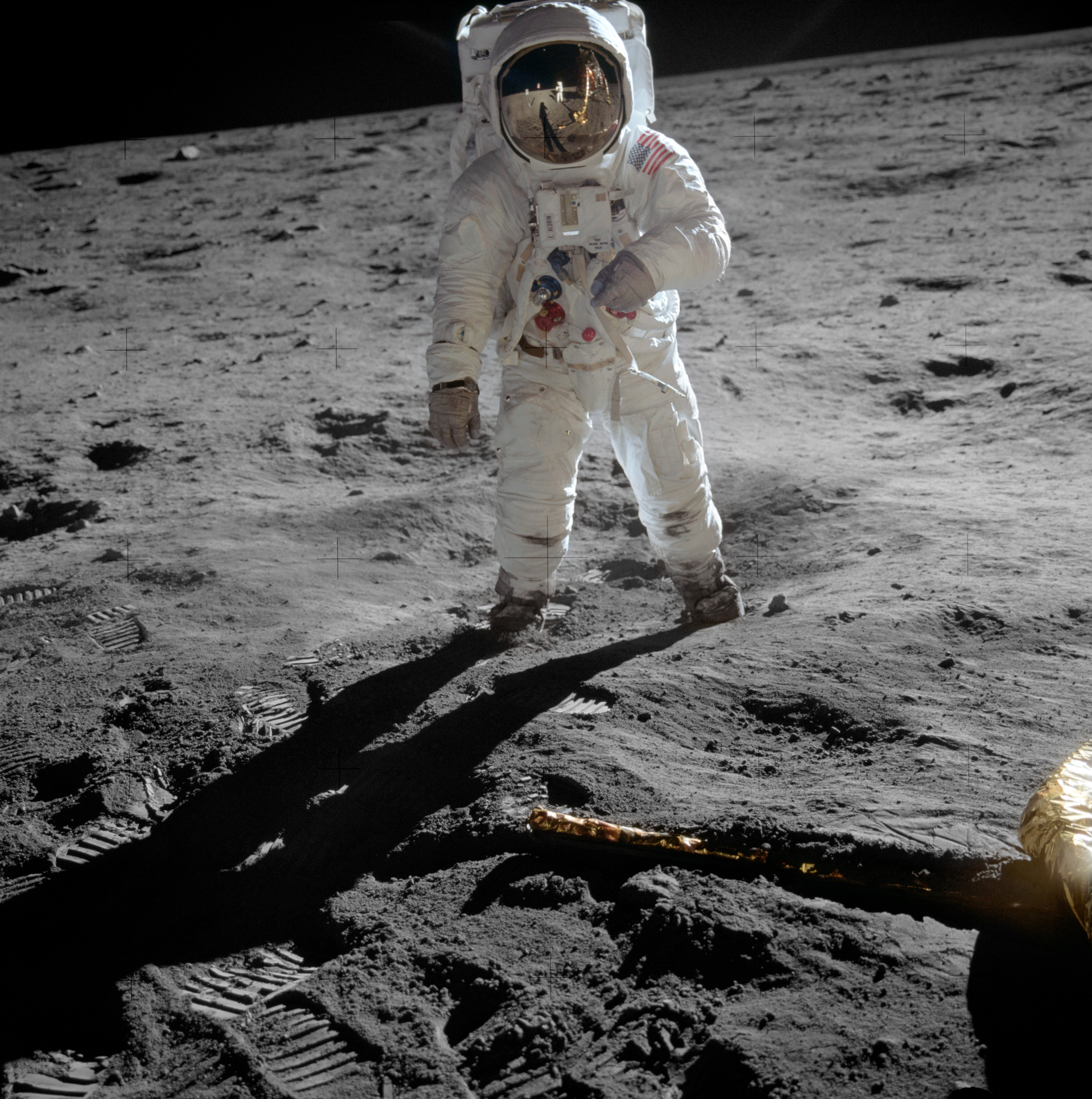
Warhol used this image of astronaut Buzz Aldrin walking on the moon near the leg of the Lunar Module Eagle, during the Apollo 11 moonwalk, 1969

Pop artist Andy Warhol's enduring fascination with television can be traced from his early paintings, including TV $199 (1961), and films such as Soap Opera (1964), to his 1968 television commercial, Underground Sundae, for Schrafft's. Throughout his career, he made numerous television appearances and commercials and produced experimental television programs and video diaries. He later created three cable television programs: Fashion (1979–1980), Andy Warhol's TV (1980–1983), and the MTV talk show Andy Warhol's Fifteen Minutes (1985–1987).

Warhol's interpersonal relationship with television began when he purchased an RCA television set in the 1950s. He later described his relationship with the medium in his book The Philosophy of Andy Warhol (From A to B and Back Again) (1975):

When I got my first TV set, I stopped caring so much about having close relationships with other people. I'd been hurt a lot to the degree you can only be hurt if you care a lot. So I guess I did care a lot, in the days before anyone ever heard of "pop art" or "underground movies" or "superstars." So in the late 50s I started an affair with my television which has continued to the present, when I play around in my bedroom with as many as four at a time.

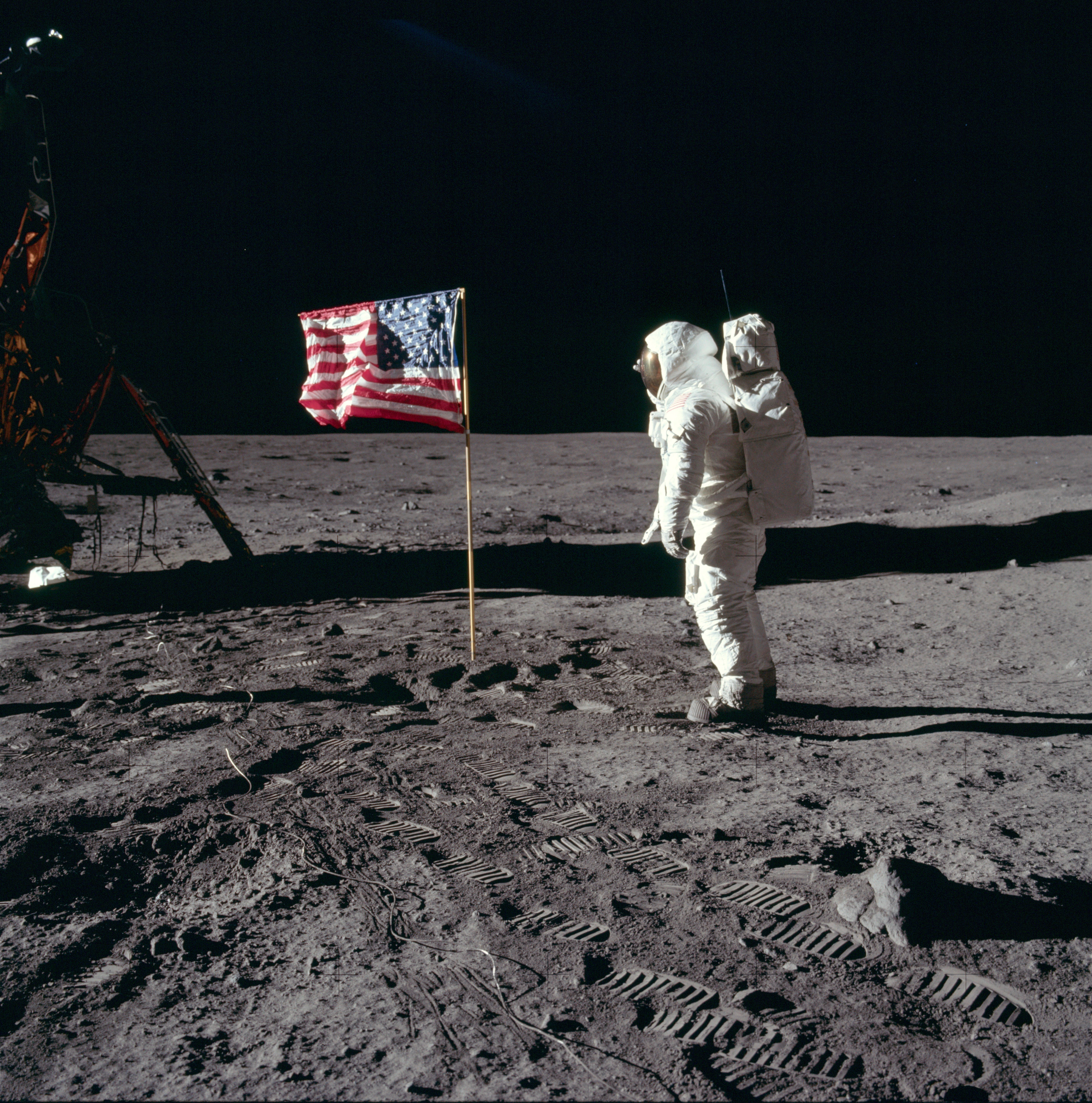
Warhol also used this image of Aldrin standing beside the deployed American flag erected at Tranquility Base on the moon, 1969

In a 1969 interview with Newsday movie critic Joseph Gelmis, Warhol similarly described television as a continuous stream of images, comparing its rapid succession of subjects to his own films:

Television is so great. Everybody ought to have at least two sets, or three, like the President. There's always something interesting to see. Television is like the movies I make. It's just a lot of pictures of cigarets [sic], cops, cowboys, kids, war, all cutting in and out of each other without stopping. If you watch it right straight through, it's just one whole big thing.

At the time of his death in 1987, Warhol was developing a portfolio of ten screenprints provisionally titled TV, conceived with New York art dealer Ronald Feldman. The portfolio was intended to trace the history of American television through iconic images from entertainment, sports, and political events. The event was one of the most widely televised events of the 20th century. Among the subjects considered were Felix the Cat in an early television test pattern, scenes from The Honeymooners and I Love Lucy, The Beatles' appearance on The Ed Sullivan Show, Babe Ruth at Yankee Stadium, and Martin Luther King Jr.'s "I Have a Dream" speech. Moonwalk, based on the Apollo 11 moon landing, was the only image to be completed and printed.

== Description ==
Moonwalk is a pair of screenprints in colors on Lenox Museum Board, each measuring approximately 37.9 × 37.9 inches (96.2 × 96.3 cm). Warhol combined two separate NASA photographs taken by astronaut Neil Armstrong during the Apollo 11 mission in 1969: one depicting astronaut Buzz Aldrin standing on the lunar surface and another showing the American flag planted nearby. The resulting screenprints are characterized by vivid and contrasting colors.

The prints were published by Ronald Feldman Fine Arts, Inc., New York, and printed by Rupert Jasen Smith. The portfolio was issued in an edition of 160 numbered sets, in addition to 31 artist's proofs.

== Portfolio ==
The portfolio is catalogued as Feldman & Schellmann II.404 and II.405.

| No. | Work | Catalogue raisonné |
|---|---|---|
| 1 | Moonwalk | F&S II.404 |
| 2 | Moonwalk | F&S II.405 |

== Interpretation ==
Moonwalk has been interpreted within Warhol's broader interest in revisiting images that had become embedded in American popular culture. By drawing on the televised memory of the Apollo 11 mission, the work combines a historically significant event with Warhol's longstanding fascination with mass-media imagery and the ways in which television shaped collective memory.

As noted in Andy Warhol Prints: A Catalogue Raisonné: "These choices highlight Warhol's preference in his later works for looking back in time rather than culling charged images from the present, as he had done in the 1960s. Because of Warhol's role as detached recorder of American society, balanced between decadence and innocence, sophistication and naiveté, his imagery has a range which would seem inconsistent for another artist."

== Art market ==
In 2019, Moonwalk became the subject of a legal dispute between brothers Keith and Robert Donaldson over the ownership and sale of a set of the prints. According to civil court papers, the brothers acquired the Warhol work jointly in 1999, with Robert retaining possession of both prints. In 2018, Keith requested the return of what he believed to be his half of the work, only to learn that Robert had sold both prints two years earlier for $200,000, netting approximately $180,000 after commission. In the resulting lawsuit, Keith sought either the return of one print or at least $140,000, which he claimed represented the fair market value of his half of the work.

In March 2019, Moonwalk, each signed and numbered 20/160, sold for £347,250 at Christie's in London.

In April 2019, Moonwalk, each print signed and numbered 'PP 3/5' (printer's proof), sold for $312,500 at Sotheby's in New York.

In April 2020, Moonwalk (F&S II.405), a single print signed and numbered 40/160, sold for $187,500 at Sotheby's in New York.

In October 2022, Moonwalk, each print signed and numbered 48/160, sold for $567,000 at Christie's in New York.

In September 2023, Moonwalk, each signed and numbered 'AP 19/31' (artist's proof), sold for £441,000 at Christie's in London.

In October 2023, Moonwalk, each print signed and numbered 87/160, sold for $635,000 at Sotheby's in New York. That month, Moonwalk, each signed and numbered 131/160, sold for $693,000 at Christie's in New York.

In October 2025, Moonwalk, a single print signed and numbered 'TP 23/66' (trial proof), sold for $406,400 at Christie's in New York.

In April 2026, Moonwalk (F&S II.405), a single print signed and numbered 94/160, sold for $358,400 at Sotheby's in New York.
