= Vanishing Animals =

1986 book by Andy Warhol and Kurt Benirschke

- Author: Andy Warhol; Kurt Benirschke
- Illustrator: Andy Warhol
- Publisher: Springer-Verlag
- Publication date: 1986
- Pages: 99
- ISBN: 0-387-96410-X
- OCLC: 14167003

Vanishing Animals is a 1986 book by American artist Andy Warhol and German-American scientist Kurt Benirschke. Published by Springer-Verlag, the book features text by Benirschke on endangered wildlife and illustrations by Warhol. Vanishing Animals focuses on lesser-known species, including the okapi, California Condor, Galapagos tortoise, and Komodo monitor. The book was intended to increase awareness of the threats facing them and encourage efforts to prevent their extinction. Vanishing Animals continued Warhol's interest in wildlife conservation following his 1983 portfolio Endangered Species.

== Background ==
Douc Langur

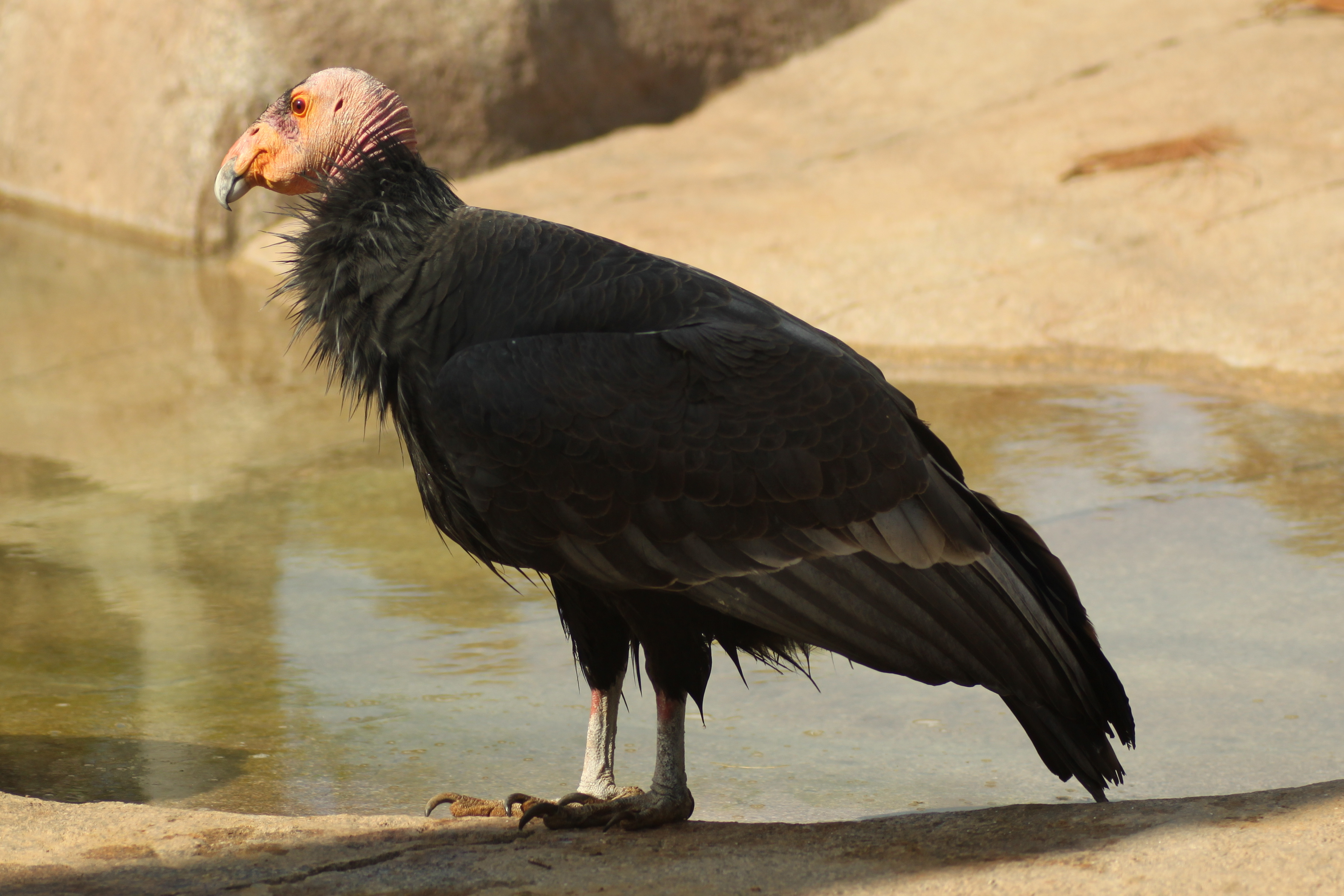
California Condor

In 1983, Pop artist Andy Warhol was commissioned by New York art dealer Ronald Feldman to create Endangered Species, a portfolio of ten screenprints depicting threatened animals. The series reflected Warhol's interest in animals and the environment. It also coincided with the 10th anniversary of the Endangered Species Act of 1973.

Warhol's growing interest in wildlife conservation brought him into contact with conservationist Kurt Benirschke, who was a professor of pathology and reproductive medicine at the University of California, San Diego, as well as a trustee and former director of research at the San Diego Zoo. Their collaboration began following a 1984 celebration of the 20th anniversary of the publishing company Springer-Verlag, held at the Union Club in New York City. Benirschke was the principal speaker and delivered a presentation on "vanishing animals."

Warhol had been invited to the event and was deeply impressed by Benirschke's presentation. Heinz Götze, managing partner of Springer-Verlag, subsequently asked Warhol to illustrate the manuscript of Benirschke's speech, which he planned to publish. Warhol accepted, resulting in the book Vanishing Animals. The book combines Warhol's Pop art imagery with Benirschke's scientific research to examine endangered species and the threat of extinction.

== Content ==
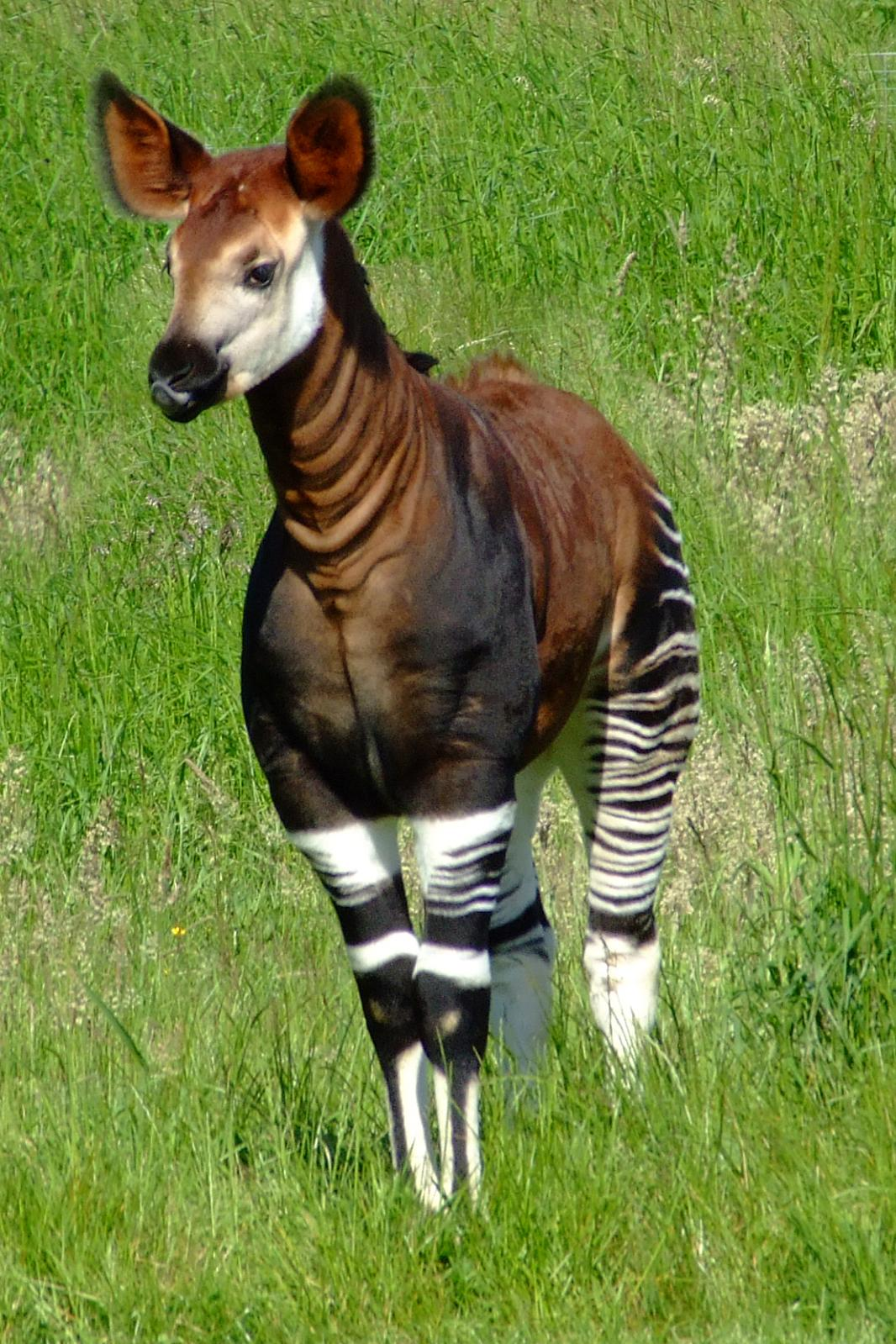
Okapi

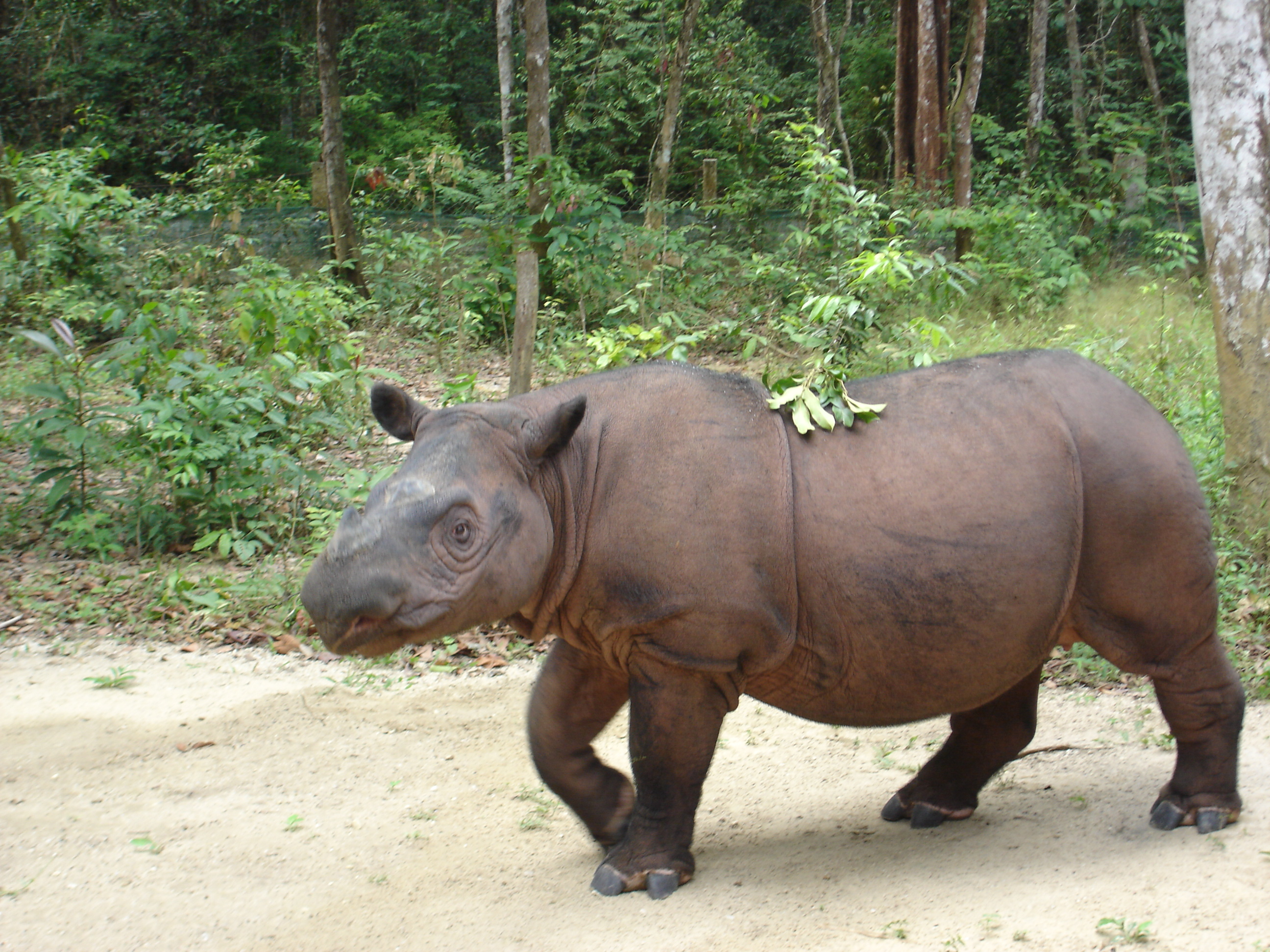
Sumatran Rhinoceros

Soemmerring's Gazelle

Vanishing Animals focuses 15 endangered animals, with their threatened status determined by the International Union for Conservation of Nature criteria: urgency, prominence, and biological value. Benirschke provided text discussing the animals, their habitats, and their prospects for survival, while Warhol created sixteen prints. There are also accompanying black-and-white drawings and photographs.

=== Illustrations ===
The prints Warhol produced for the book were silkscreens over collages made from colored paper. The works in the book measure approximately 14.3/8 × 14.3/8 inches (36.5 × 36.5 cm). Warhol also produced screenprints and drawings in various dimensions. Related works from the project have subsequently entered the art market.

The prints are catalogued as Feldman & Schellmann IIIB.51–67.

| No. | Title | Catalogue raisonné |
|---|---|---|
| 1 | Douc Langur (Mother and Baby) | F.S. III.B.51 |
| 2 | California Condor | F.S. III.B.52 |
| 3 | La Plata River Dolphin | F.S. III.B.53 |
| 4 | Mouse Armadillo | F.S. III.B.54 |
| 5 | Mongolian Wild Horse | F.S. III.B.55 |
| 6 | Giant Chaco Peccary | F.S. III.B.56 |
| 7 | Okapi | F.S. III.B.57 |
| 8 | Whooping Crane | F.S. III.B.58 |
| 9 | Komodo Monitor | F.S. III.B.59 |
| 10 | Sumatra's Rhinoceros | F.S. III.B.60 |
| 11 | Douc Langur | F.S. III.B.61 |
| 12 | Bats | F.S. III.B.62 |
| 13 | Butterflies | F.S. III.B.63 |
| 14 | Butterfly | F.S. III.B.64 |
| 15 | Sömmering Gazelle | F.S. III.B.65 |
| 16 | Galapagos Tortoise | F.S. III.B.66 |
| 17 | Puerto Rican Parrot | F.S. III.B.67 |

== Publication ==
Vanishing Animals was published in hardcover by Springer-Verlag in November 1986. On December 2, 1986, Warhol signed copies of the book at the Museum Shop of the American Museum of Natural History in New York City.

== Critical reception ==
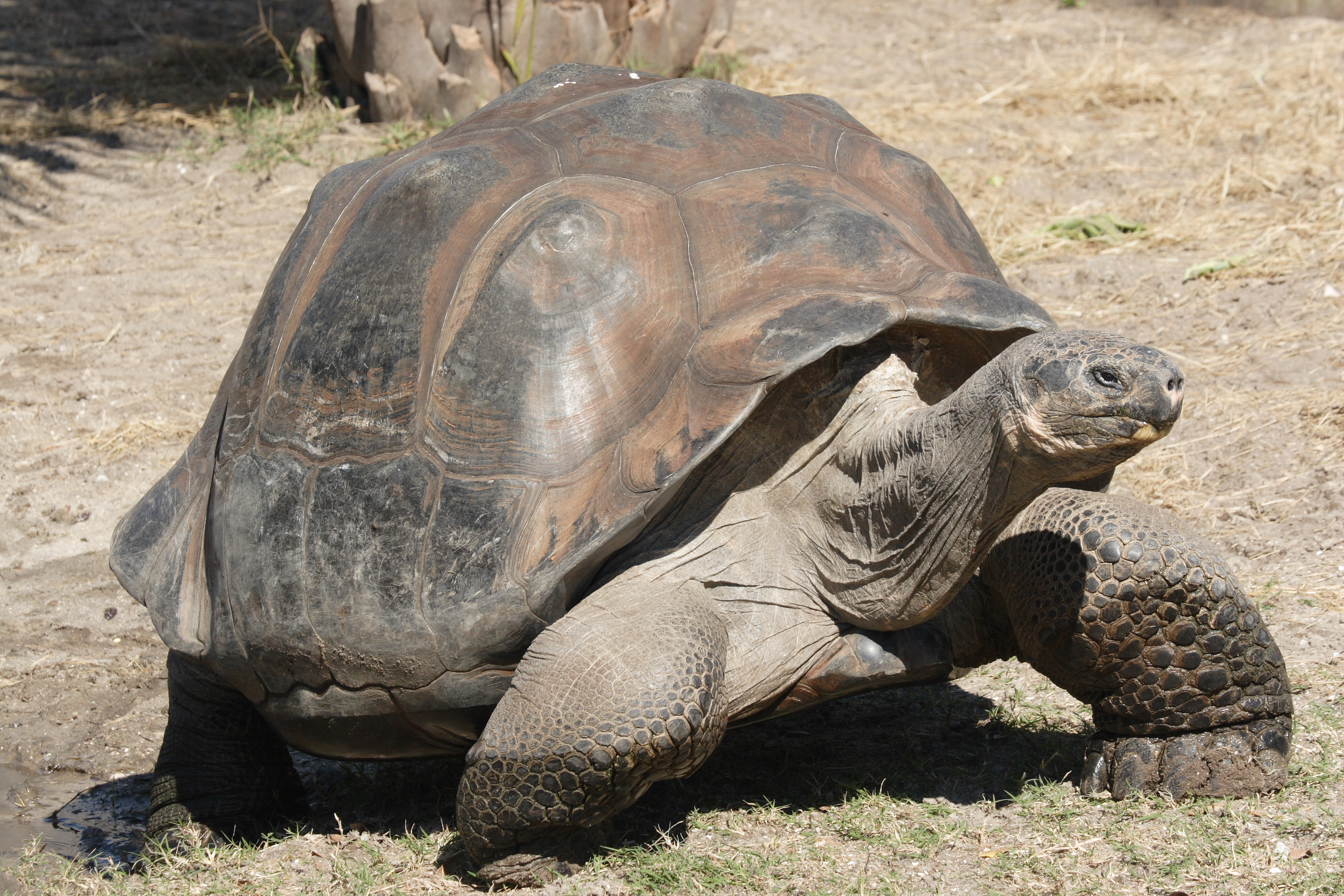
Galapagos Tortoise

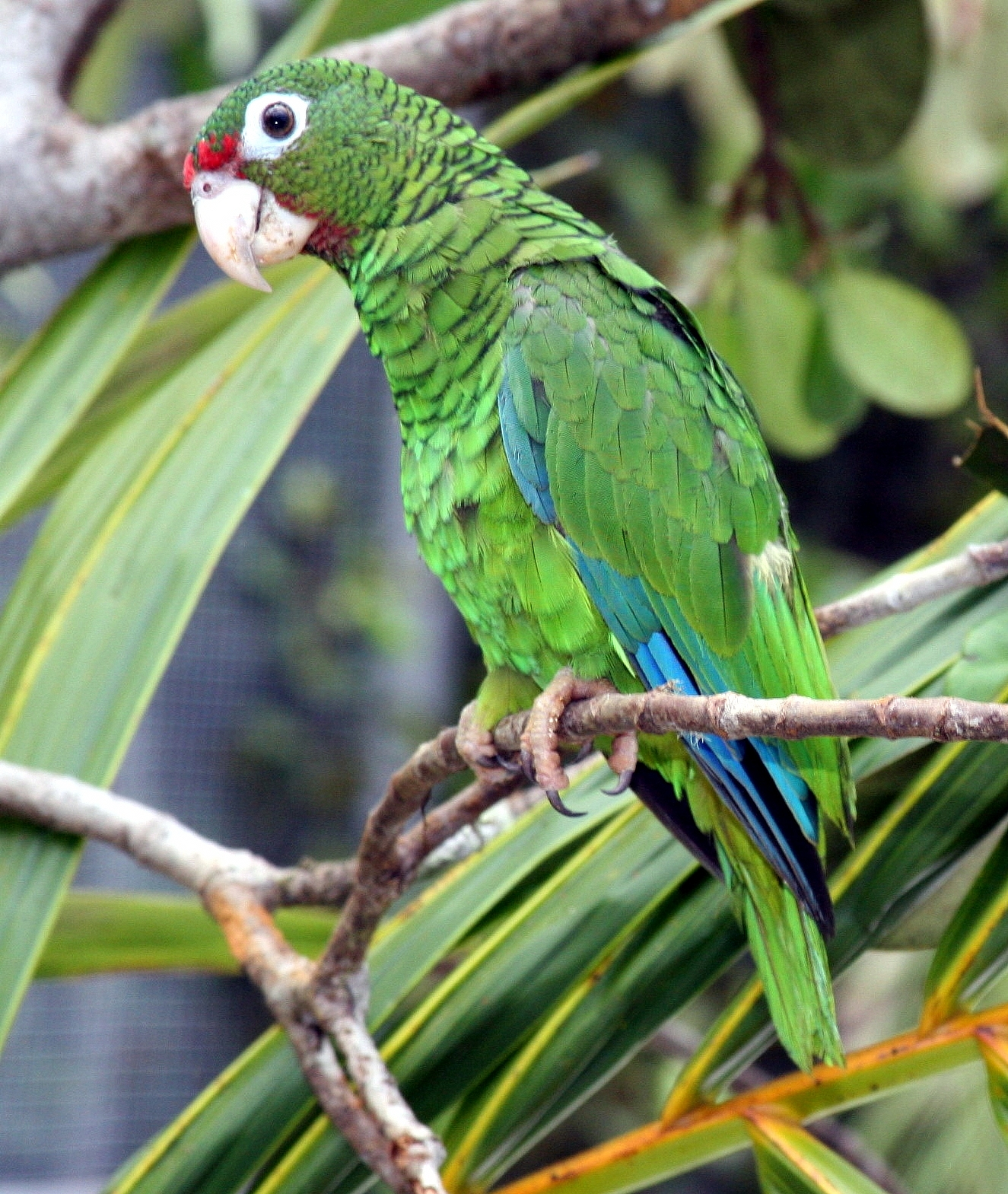
Puerto Rican Parrot

D. L. Plung of the Carlsbad Current-Argus described Vanishing Animals as having a "fine balance among aesthetic presentation, factual information, and clearly communicated appreciation for the distinct value of each and every species discussed." He noted that the book introduces readers to overlooked threatened animals such as the California condor and okapi. Plung praised the illustrations, which he called the book's "greatest marketing tool" and representative of Warhol's "colorful and powerful style that has kept him at the forefront of contemporary art." He concluded that the book "succeeds in giving the reader and unrivaled appreciation of these animals and the complexity of issues faced by conservationist fighting for their survival."

British environmentalist Norman Myers wrote in American Scientist that Vanishing Animals was a welcome contribution to the literature on the extinction crisis. He noted that the book presented underrepresented endangered species, including the douc langur, Puerto Rican parrot, and Komodo monitor, rather than familiar "flagship animals" such as the panda and gorilla. Myers regarded the illustrations among Warhol's "most innovative efforts," and declared, "I have not come across anything so immediately illuminating as this. Indeed I have learned as much, through intuitive application, from this book as from several biological treatises put together. An extremely agreeable way for scientists to sense what is ultimately at stake as we grossly deplete the panoply of life-forms sharing our earth."

Publishers Weekly wrote that Benirschke's "enthusiasm and ability to convey scientific information in simple, absorbing terms should win converts to the cause." Ray Olson of Booklist similarly described his writing as "open, appealing, yet authoritative and informed."
