= Ronald Feldman =

American art dealer (1938–2022)

Ronald Feldman (1938 – December 22, 2022) was an American art dealer and advocate for the arts, especially contemporary performance and conceptual art.

== Biography ==
Ira Ronald Feldman was born in the Bronx to Irving and Judith (Solon) Feldman on April 25, 1938. His father Irving was the President of Zelart Drug Company and served as President of Toiletry Merchandisers of America. Ronald grew up on Long Island in Long Beach. He graduated from Syracuse University with a B.A. degree and later from New York University Law School with a law degree.

In 1963 he married Frayda Futterman. Futterman grew up in Larchmont, New York and worked at the McCall corporation.

After law school Feldman worked for the corporate-law firm of Hefland, Lesser & Moriber and made partner there. Feldman did not enjoy being a corporate lawyer and with his wife's help opened Ronald Feldman Fine Arts in November 1971.

After running the Gallery for most of his life, he retired in 2019. He died on December 20, 2022 in Chappaqua, N.Y. at the age of 84 after struggling with Alzheimer’s disease.

== Ronald Feldman Gallery ==
Ronald Feldman Fine Arts was founded in 1971 with the intention of being private dealers rather than a public gallery and was located in an Upper East Side townhouse on East 74th Street near the Whitney Museum.

Feldman Fine Arts became a haven for performance and conceptual art that other dealers and galleries would not represent or show. In 1972, the gallery held Hannah Wilke’s debut solo exhibition "in which the artist displayed a suite of her anatomically-allusive wall-mounted sculptures." The gallery was an early proponent of art that featured themes of women's rights, politics, the environment, and war.

In 1974, Feldman worked with Joseph Beuys, offering him gallery space, but instead creating a ten-day lecture tour titled "Energy Plan for the Western Man". The tour started with a public lecture held at The New School. This was the first time Beuys expounded on his ideas of social sculpture in America. At the time he was refusing to travel to the U.S. in protest of the Vietnam war.

In 1975, Chris Burden performed White Light/White Heat at the Feldman Gallery. In this performance Burden spent twenty-two days in the gallery without eating or speaking. The Feldman Gallery was also the first to exhibit works by the Russian-born duo Vitaly Komar and Alexander Melamid which it did by smuggling work out of the Soviet Union and displaying it in 1976. Though the art was exhibited, the artists were stopped by Soviet authorities from attending the exhibition.

During the 1980s, Feldman collaborated closely with Pop artist Andy Warhol, a frequent visitor to the gallery. Together, they conceptualized and published several of Warhol's most notable late-career print portfolios, including Ten Portraits of Jews of the Twentieth Century (1980), Myths (1981), Endangered Species (1983), Ads (1985), and Moonwalk (1987).

The Gallery moved locations to Mercer Street in SoHo in 1982. After a year at both locations, they consolidated to just the Mercer Street location. In the 1980s the Gallery also held exhibitions by Ida Applebroog, Ilya Kabakov, Todd Siler, Nancy Chunn, Joseph Beuys, and Eleanor Antin among others.

The gallery has continued to mount exhibitions by artists such as Roxy Paine, Pepón Osorio, and Cassils. In 2017, Cassils "staged an exhibition in which they collected 200 gallons of urine, in a commentary on how the Trump administration had stripped transgender students of their legal right to use bathrooms that best fit their chosen gender identities."

In 2017, the name officially changed to Ronald Feldman Gallery. The gallery is now run by Feldman's son, Mark Feldman.

== Political involvement ==
Ronald Feldman advocated for art and artists in many ways. One was to be active in the political sphere. In the 1990s he was appointed by President Bill Clinton to serve on the National Council on the Arts which he did for five years. Feldman served on many boards as well including the boards of The New School’s Vera List Center (VLC) for Art and Politics, Creative Capital, People for the American Way, and the Art Dealers Association of America.

Feldman joined the VLC Advisory Committee in 1992 and was an inaugural member. He was affiliated with the Committee for 30 years. He supported many of the VLC programming including Sustaining Democracy, debates on the National Endowment of the Arts and the "decency clause", and forums on the American electoral system.
