= Ads (Warhol) =

1985 series of prints by Andy Warhol

- Artist: Andy Warhol
- Year: 1985
- Catalogue: F&S II.350–359
- Medium: Screenprints in colors on Lenox Museum Board
- Movement: Pop Art
- Dimensions: 96.5 cm × 96.5 cm (38.0 in × 38.0 in)

Ads is a portfolio of ten screenprints created by American artist Andy Warhol in 1985. The works revisit the commercial imagery that had informed Warhol's early career as a commercial illustrator, drawing on advertisements and popular culture, including corporate logos, consumer products, automobiles, food, and Hollywood celebrities. The portfolio features the brands and subjects Chanel, Ronald Reagan, James Dean, Judy Garland, Life Savers, Mobil, Volkswagen, Donald Duck, and Macintosh. Ads was commissioned by art dealer Ronald Feldman and published by Ronald Feldman Fine Arts in an edition of 190.

== Background ==
1941 Mobilgas ad

Advertising had been a recurring subject throughout Andy Warhol's career. Before becoming one of the leading figures of the Pop art movement, he worked as a commercial artist in New York, producing illustrations for magazines, department stores, and advertising campaigns. He later incorporated imagery taken from commercial culture, including Campbell's soup cans, dollar bills, Coca-Cola bottles, and celebrity publicity photographs.

In 1984, art dealer Ronald Feldman proposed that Warhol create a portfolio based on American advertising. Warhol recorded in his diary on March 14, 1984: "Ron Feldman came up to talk about the new project, the portfolio of old magazine ads. But he wants me to do corny ones—like the Judy Garland Blackglama ads. He doesn't want the Coke one. He says who would buy it." Warhol and Feldman selected ten images representing fashion, automobiles, technology, entertainment, and consumer products, which Warhol produced in an edition of 190 in 1985. Feldman Fine Arts sought permissions from the copyright holders for Warhol to depict.

== Copyright and licensing ==
Apple logo for Macintosh

The Ads series involved the use of corporate trademarks, advertising imagery, and other copyrighted material, including the Mobil Pegasus, Paramount Pictures logo, Chanel perfume bottle, Volkswagen advertising, Apple logo, and a Van Heusen advertisement featuring Ronald Reagan.

The corporations whose imagery appeared in the series generally permitted Warhol to use their trademarks because of his established reputation. Warhol's provided the companies with cultural recognition and, in some cases, influenced subsequent presentations of their own trademarks. Feldman cited Paramount's later modification of its logo's coloring and Chanel's incorporation of a yellow line resembling one Warhol had added to his depiction of its perfume bottle. Chanel subsequently acquired rights to use Warhol's version in its advertising.

1960 Volkswagen Beetle De Luxe Sedan

The Van Heusen (Ronald Reagan) print presented a different legal situation. The source advertisement featured Ronald Reagan promoting Van Heusen Century shirts with the slogan "won't wrinkle... ever!" Warhol and Feldman were aware that Van Heusen could object to the use of the advertisement. They nevertheless proceeded with the work, reasoning that, as a practical matter, neither the company nor Reagan was likely to seek legal action over an image that portrayed the future president in a humorous commercial context.

Several works in the Ads portfolio involved arrangements with the owners of the source imagery. Warhol obtained rights to use an image of James Dean from an advertisement promoting the film East of Eden (1955) for the Japanese market from the Curtis Licensing Company.

== Portfolio ==
1948 Life Savers ad

The portfolio is catalogued as Feldman & Schellmann II.350–359.

No.	Work	Catalogue raisonné
1	Mobil	F&S II.350
2	Blackglama (Judy Garland)	F&S II.351
3	Paramount	F&S II.352
4	Life Savers	F&S II.353
5	Chanel	F&S II.354
6	Rebel Without a Cause (James Dean)	F&S II.355
7	Van Heusen (Ronald Reagan)	F&S II.356
8	The New Spirit (Donald Duck)	F&S II.357
9	Volkswagen	F&S II.358
10	Apple	F&S II.359

== Interpretation ==
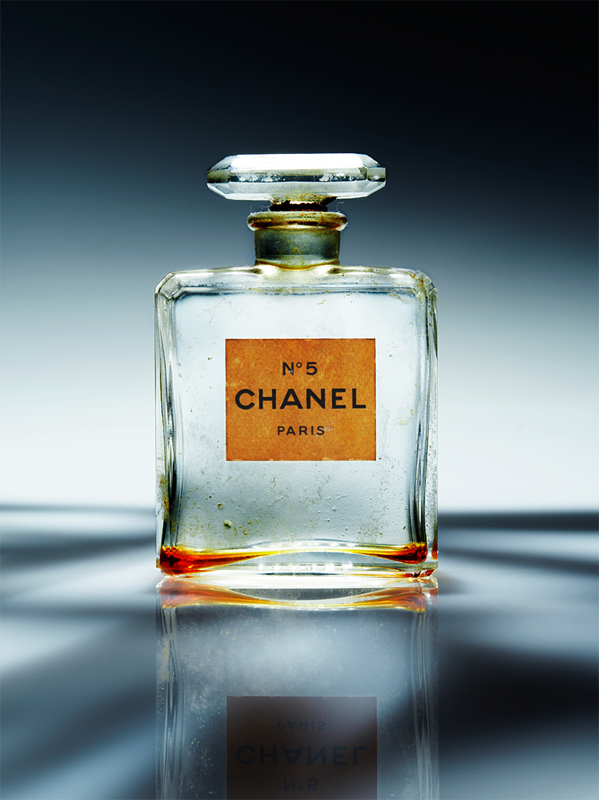
Chanel No. 5 bottle

The Ads series has been interpreted as a playful commentary on advertising and commercial culture, particularly in light of Warhol's background as a commercial illustrator. The portfolio draws on Warhol's longstanding use of mass-media imagery, while also depicting Hollywood's relationship with consumerism.

Several works bring together imagery associated with major American companies and changing forms of popular culture. The New Spirit (Donald Duck) recalls Disney's use of Donald Duck in wartime propaganda, while its placement alongside Apple—which depicts the Macintosh computer logo—can be read as a juxtaposition of two influential American businesses from different generations. The inclusion of Chanel reflects Warhol's longstanding interest in perfume, while Paramount draws on his fascination with the film industry, and it may allude to his relationship with Paramount executive Jon Gould. The Mobil Pegasus, meanwhile, evokes an earlier period of American commercial imagery.

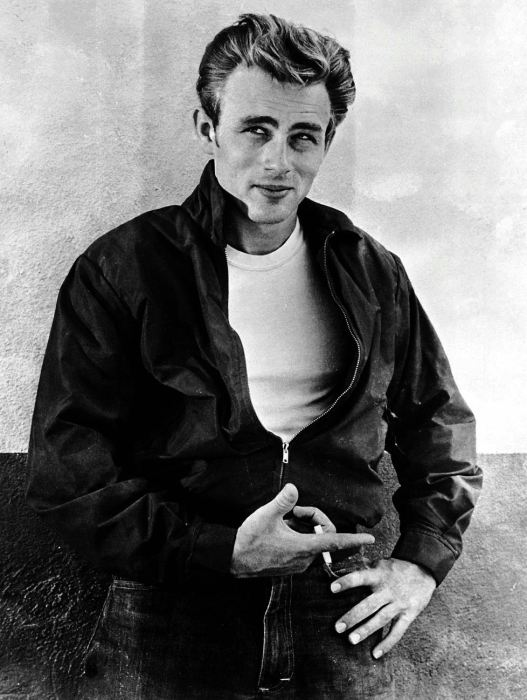
Publicity still of James Dean for Rebel Without a Cause (1955)

The celebrity subjects similarly combine glamour and nostalgia. Blackglama (Judy Garland) transforms a posthumous advertising portrait of Garland into a Warhol portrait, bringing together his interest in old Hollywood and fashion. Rebel Without a Cause (James Dean) revisits the mythology of James Dean, who became an enduring symbol of 1950s youth culture. Van Heusen (Ronald Reagan) places an image of the then-president within the context of commercial advertising, while the Volkswagen print appropriates the well-known "lemon" campaign and its deliberately unconventional approach to automobile advertising.

Academic Stuart Lenig wrote that, "In a way, Warhol's new design work acknowledged and accepted his enthronement as a member of the establishment." As noted in Andy Warhol Prints: A Catalogue Raisonné, "In these prints, Warhol continued to position his imagery on the boundary between art about advertising and art as advertising, as he had since the beginning of his career." The Ads portfolio relates to Warhol's first print, Cooking Pot (1962), which was based on a newspaper advertisement. Unlike the modestly scaled Cooking Pot, however, the Ads prints feature famous brand names and personalities presented as large, brightly colored screenprints.

Writer David Bollier places Warhol's use of commercial imagery within the broader conflict between artistic appropriation and intellectual property rights. Bollier argues that Warhol's reputation gave him unusual freedom to work with corporate imagery, describing him as "both a regular case and a special case" in relation to copyright and trademark law.

== Exhibitions ==
The Ads portfolio was first publicly exhibited at the Amelie A. Wallace Gallery in Old Westbury, New York from February 4 to March 2, 1985. It was subsequently exhibited at the Atchison Gallery in Birmingham, Alabama from May 19 to June 10, 1985. The prints were also shown at the Govinda Gallery in Washington, D.C., from May 23 to June 30, 1985.

The portfolio was exhibited at the Center Gallery at Bucknell University in Lewisburg, Pennsylvania, from August 1 to September 1, 1985. At the Kilcawley Center Art Gallery in Youngstown, Ohio, the Ads portfolio was exhibited alongside Warhol's Endangered Species portfolio from September 25 to October 19, 1985.

In 2000, the portfolio was exhibited at Ronald Feldman Fine Arts in New York from October 26 to December 22.

== Critical reception ==
Jo Ann Lewis of The Washington Post praised the Ads portfolio, describing Warhol as "an expert on fabricated myths" and noting that the works represented a return to the commercial world he "so fully understands." She wrote that the portfolio was "easy to like" and argued that Warhol's treatment of familiar commercial images encouraged viewers to become more visually aware and skeptical of advertising. Lewis singled out the Ronald Reagan print as the portfolio's most "uncannily timely." She concluded, "Warhol reveals his wit and sense of irony in the way he has altered this and other images, though ever so slightly. In all of them, he caresses the image with his nervous line—a classic part of the Warholizing process."

== Art market ==
In November 2014, the set Ads, each signed in pencil and numbered 'T.P. 13/30' (trial proof), sold for $1,025,000 at Christie's.

In November 2025, the set Ads, inscribed AP 22/30 (artist's proof), sold for $2,978,000 at Sotheby's.

In May 2026, the set Ads, signed and numbered 57/190, sold for $2,926,000 at Sotheby's.
