= Myths (Warhol) =

1981 series of silkscrens by Andy Warhol

- Artist: Andy Warhol
- Year: 1981
- Catalogue: F&S II.258–267
- Medium: Screenprint with diamond dust on Lenox Museum Board
- Movement: Pop Art
- Dimensions: 96.5 cm × 96.5 cm (38.0 in × 38.0 in)

Myths is a series of works created by American artist Andy Warhol in 1981. Commissioned by art dealer Ronald Feldman, the series includes a portfolio of ten screenprints, issued in an edition of 200, along with related silkscreen paintings. The works depict nostalgic figures drawn primarily from 20th-century film, television, and cartoons, including Superman, Howdy Doody, the Wicked Witch of the West from The Wizard of Oz, Greta Garbo as Mata Hari, Dracula, and Mickey Mouse. Other subjects, including Uncle Sam, Santa Claus, and Mammy, had been widely used for patriotic imagery and advertising. Warhol portrayed himself as The Shadow, effectively elevating himself into the pantheon of mythical figures he depicted.

== Copyright and licensing ==
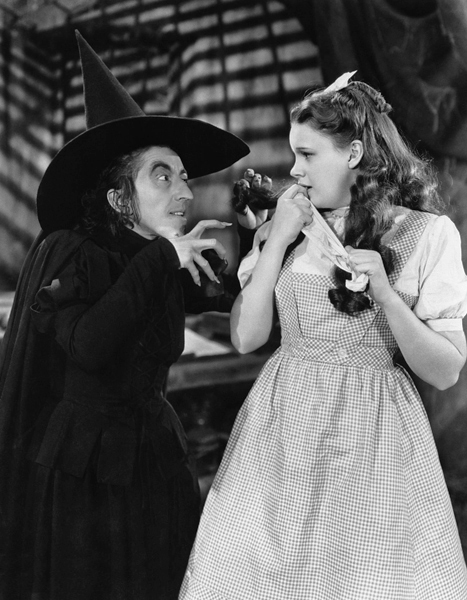
Publicity still of Margaret Hamilton and Judy Garland in The Wizard of Oz (1939)

Warhol began working on the Myths series in October 1980, a project that was commissioned by gallerist Ronald Feldman. Warhol and publisher Feldman navigated extensive copyright and trademark negotiations to secure rights for images of Superman, Mickey Mouse, and Greta Garbo from the film Mata Hari. Permissions were obtained from companies such as The Walt Disney Company and Warner Bros., while actress Margaret Hamilton agreed to pose as the Wicked Witch of the West in exchange for special prints rather than payment. He also photographed the original Howdy Doody puppet in December 1980.

Some proposed images proved more contentious. The Quaker Oats Company threatened legal action over Warhol's proposed depiction of Aunt Jemima, a fictional character associated with their pancake mix and syrup. Warhol subsequently changed the title of the print to Mammy and used singer Sylvia Williams as the model. The change was intended not only to avoid a legal dispute with Quaker Oats, but also to reflect Warhol's view that the myth he was depicting extended beyond the company's product to the broader cultural image of the "Mammy" archetype.

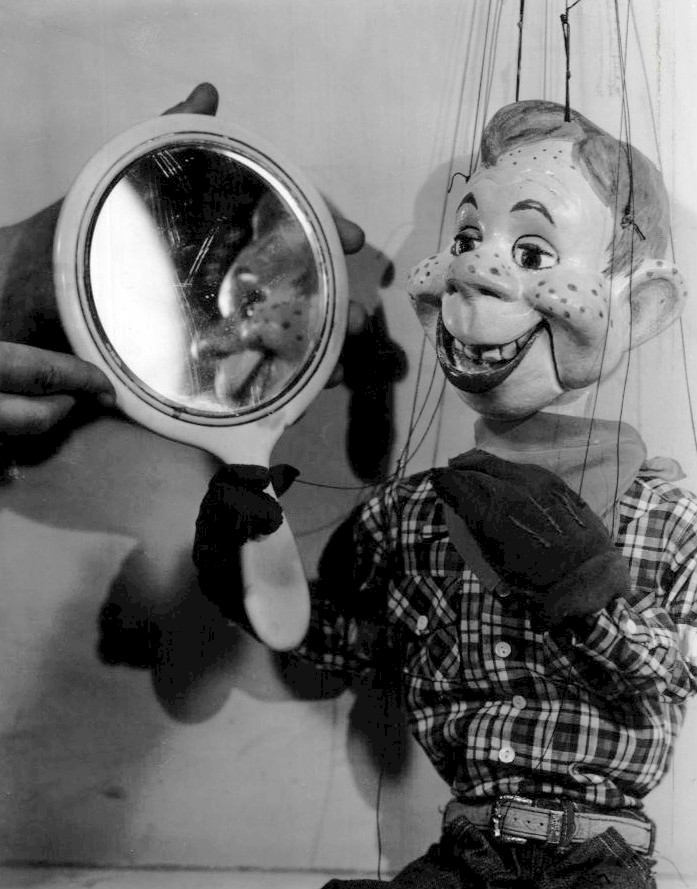
Howdy Doody, 1949

Warhol also abandoned plans to use the Coca-Cola Santa Claus illustration after permission was denied by artist Haddon Sundblom's estate. Instead, he hired a model to pose as Santa Claus, Dracula, and Mother Goose. Warhol recorded in his diary on January 18, 1981, "I think the best thing we decided to do is have people come and dress up in the costumes and we'll take the pictures ourselves, because that way there's no copyright to worry about." Warhol initially wanted to pose in drag for the portfolio, but his business manager, Fred Hughes, advised him to reserve the idea for a later project.

Warhol's Mickey Mouse became one of the portfolio's most notable works. Disney granted permission after negotiations with company attorney Pete Smith, allowing Warhol to use archival Mickey imagery in exchange for a fee, special prints, and an agreement not to depict the character in a sexualized or derogatory way. Warhol and Feldman retained shared rights to the resulting images, although Disney maintained approval over commercial uses outside Warhol's own promotion. Feldman later remarked that "Disney gave up a 50 percent interest in Mickey Mouse in whatever images Andy made."

== Portfolio ==
The portfolio is catalogued as Feldman & Schellmann II.258–267.

No.	Work	Subject	Catalogue raisonné
1	The Star	Greta Garbo as Mata Hari in Mata Hari (1931)	F&S II.258
2	Uncle Sam	Personification of the United States	F&S II.259
3	Superman	Superman	F&S II.260
4	The Witch	Margaret Hamilton as the Wicked Witch of the West in The Wizard of Oz (1939)	F&S II.261
5	Mammy	Mammy archetype associated with Gone with the Wind (1939)	F&S II.262
6	Howdy Doody	Howdy Doody television puppet	F&S II.263
7	Dracula	Dracula	F&S II.264
8	Mickey Mouse	Mickey Mouse	F&S II.265
9	Santa Claus	Santa Claus	F&S II.266
10	The Shadow	Andy Warhol	F&S II.267

== Interpretations ==
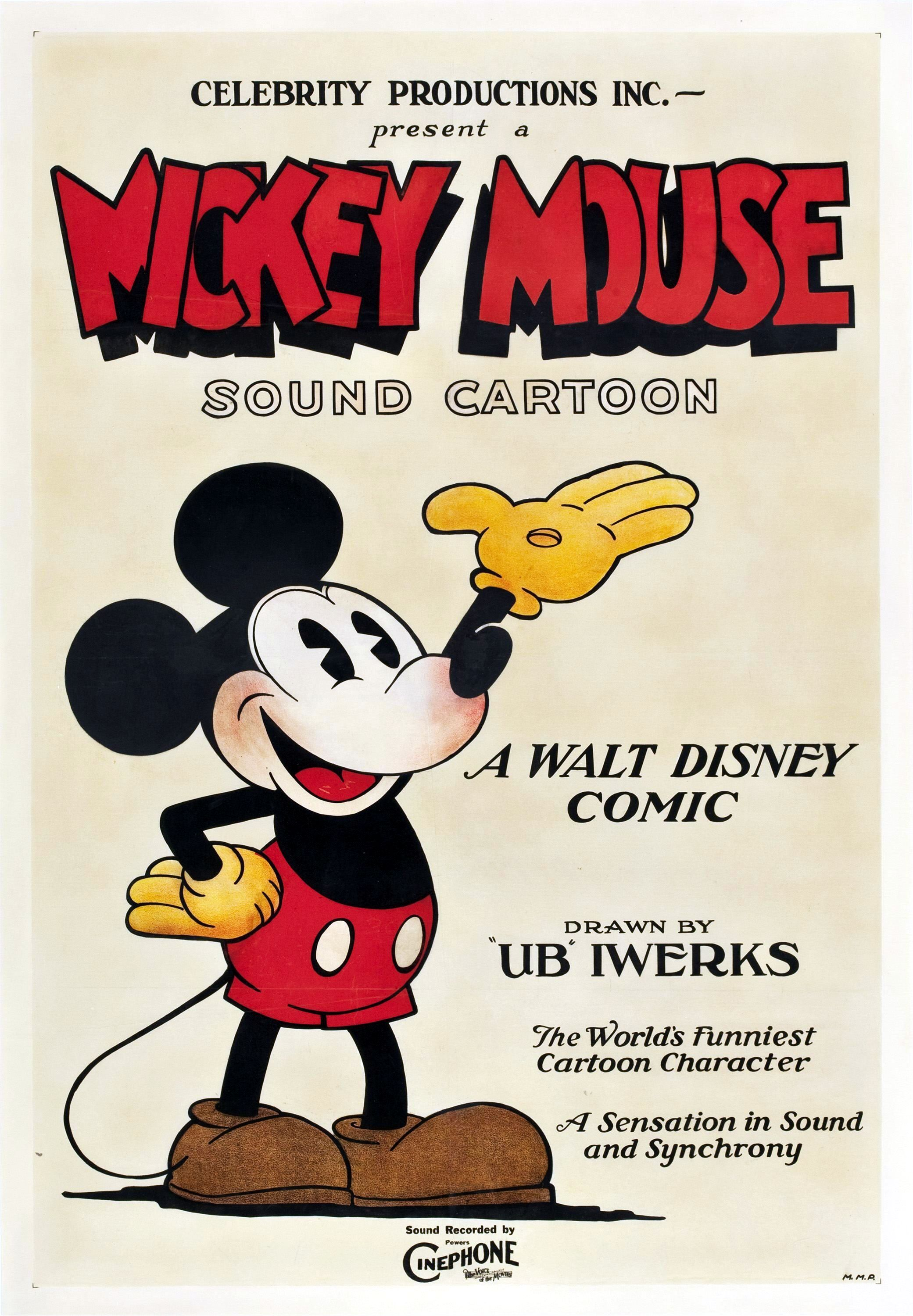
1928 Mickey Mouse poster

Uncle Sam in a WW I U.S. Army recruitment poster, 1917

The Myths series marked a return to the type of mass-media imagery Warhol had appropriated during the 1960s, when his work raised questions about the influence of popular media on cultural values. Unlike his earlier portraits of celebrities, the series relies on nostalgia, depicting mostly fictional figures associated with childhood, including superheroes and monsters.

Curator Christopher Phillips interprets Myths as Warhol's attempt to reach an "ontologically higher plane" through the depiction of cultural idols. Phillips notes that "the aura of glamour that surrounds Warhol's celebrity icons springs directly from the sense that the subjects have crossed over to the same zone of timeless ubiquity occupied by consumer products like Campbell's soup." He argued, "Warhol set out to achieve the same kind of transcendence, the only one in which he could fully believe."

Likewise, art historian Anthony E. Grudin interprets Myths as a reflection Warhol's changing relationship to American popular culture and celebrity. Warhol himself was dissatisfied with the portfolio, recording in his diary that the images looked "so sixties." Grudin suggests that they appeared outdated because Warhol had become increasingly immersed in celebrity culture, socializing with figures who had themselves become cultural myths while simultaneously becoming a mythic figure in his own right.

Grudin also contrasts the Myths with Warhol's imagery of the 1960s. Rather than using existing mass-media for all of his source images, Warhol photographed models in costumes to avoid copyright issues. He concluded, "The results were disappointing—Warhol's special relation with myths required proximity and distance. The myths he found so fascinating lost their power when they were made in-house; in order to be effective, they had to be appropriated from elsewhere, permissions be damned."

== Exhibitions ==
The Myths series was first exhibited at Ronald Feldman Fine Arts, Downtown, in New York from September 15 to October 17, 1981. In October 1981, the portfolio was exhibited at the NorthPark National Bank art gallery in Dallas, alongside a three-print study of boxer Muhammad Ali and Warhol's early Campbell's Soup Cans works.

In November 1981, Weinstock's department store in Sacramento launched its holiday promotion by displaying Myths in its stores and establishing an art scholarship in Warhol's name at the University of California, Davis.

The series was subsequently exhibited at the Thomas Segal Gallery in Boston in Andy Warhol: Myths 1981, from December 5, 1981, to January 13, 1982. It was then shown at the Marianne Deson Gallery in Chicago in Andy Warhol: Myths, from February 12 to March 17, 1982, followed by an exhibition at Modernism Gallery in San Francisco, from March 1 to April 30, 1982. Myths was also exhibited at the Reconnaissance Gallery in Fitzroy, Victoria, from April 16 to 29, 1982.

Prints from Myths, together with Warhol's Ten Portraits of Jews of the Twentieth Century (1980) and Endangered Species (1983), were included in Andy Warhol in the '80s at the Aldrich Contemporary Art Museum in Ridgefield, from September 25 to December 31, 1983.

In May 1988, the Pittsburgh Children's Museum in Pittsburgh opened the Andy Warhol Myths gallery, featuring the series, which had been acquired for the museum's permanent collection. The gallery also included a hands-on silkscreening studio.

The series was later exhibited at Ronald Feldman Fine Arts in New York in Myths 1981, from January 8 to February 12, 2000.

== Critical reception ==
Art critic Robert Rooney wrote in The Age: "'Myths' is essentially a slick, commercial package that combines the marketing expertise of its publisher Ronald Feldman and Warhol's habit of never saying no to any suggestion. Considered as such, the series works well with some reservations. … The 10 prints are immaculately printed and carefully color coordinated, particularly in 'Dracula' and 'Mammy' where close tones and black-on-black are used with subtlety. … If you prefer Warhol's classic icons of the 60s, with their clogged screens and other processed accidents, you will probably be repelled by the slickness of the Myths."

== Art market ==
In 1981, Weinstock's department store offered its customers a set for $15,000 or individual serigraphs for $1,500.

In October 2018, a suite of 10 screenprints from the Myths portfolio sold for $780,500 at Christie's.

In October 2020, the set Myths, each signed and numbered 72/200, sold for $867,000 at Sotheby's in New York.

In March 2021, the painting Myths (Multiple) sold for £2,314,000 at Sotheby's in London.

In October 2022, the set Myths, each signed and numbered 135/200, sold for $1,008,000 at Sotheby's in New York.

In February 2025, individual paintings from a set were sold for a total of $832,900 at Christie's online "Andy Warhol Myths" single-artist auction.

In November 2025, the painting The Witch (from Myths), sold for $1,392,000 at Sotheby's in New York.

== In pop culture ==
Weinstock's commissioned Warhol to create the cover of its 1981 Christmas magazine, The Art of Giving, which featured his Santa Claus serigraph from the Myths portfolio. On November 14, 1981, Warhol appeared at the store to sign reproductions from the series and the November 1981 issue of Interview.

In 1988, Warhol's Mickey Mouse print was featured on the cover of a special commemorative edition of Time magazine marking the character's 60th birthday. The image was subsequently used in a special advertising supplement in the November 1988 issue of Life magazine, which also celebrated Mickey Mouse's milestone anniversary.
