= Rupert Jasen Smith =

American artist (1951–1989)

Rupert Jasen Smith Jr. (February 1951 – February 15, 1989) was an American artist who worked closely with pop artist Andy Warhol as a silkscreen printer and art director for a decade. His association with Warhol led him to collaborate with other artists, including Paul Jenkins, Frank Stella, and Robert Rauschenberg. Smith owned one of New York City's top printmaking studios and also held solo exhibitions of his artwork.

== Early life and education ==
Smith grew up in St. Lucie County, Florida, the son of an attorney, Rupert Jasen Smith Sr., and Peggy Jane Hamilton, an interior designer. His father later became a circuit judge of the 19th Judicial Circuit. His maternal uncle was James Hamilton, the scenic designer behind the award-winning sets for the musical Oliver! and other stage productions.

Smith attended preparatory school in Boca Raton, Florida. He had his first art show as a teenager in Fort Pierce, Florida, in 1967.

In 1973, Smith received a Bachelor of Fine Arts degree from Pratt Institute in New York City. During his first year as an art student, Smith accompanied actress Julie Christie around New York City.

== Career ==
After graduating from the Pratt Institute, Smith and a group of other students rented two former cheese factories on Duane Street in Manhattan's Financial District to use as lofts. They gut renovated the buildings themselves, and subsequently, the buildings were featured on the cover of a national magazine to highlight an article on "Urban Pioneers" in 1975. Smith used one of the lofts as a studio, and he later purchased the two buildings. Smith's studio became one of New York's top printmaking studios. His clients included artists Andy Warhol, Jamie Wyeth, and Robert Rauschenberg, and musician John Lennon.

Smith worked with the J. Walter Thompson advertising agency before meeting Warhol in 1977. He began working with Warhol on his Hammer and Sickle (1977) series. Warhol was impressed with Smith's work and appointed him his master printmaker and art director. Warhol allowed Smith's printer's stamp to be placed next to his signature on their collaborations, which include silkscreen portraits of Princess Grace of Monaco, Ingrid Bergman, Mickey Mouse, and Edward Kennedy. Smith was also a serigrapher for the Warhol series Ten Portraits of Jews of the Twentieth Century (1980), Shoes (1980), Myths (1981), Endangered Species (1983), and Reigning Queens (1985). Smith's printer's stamp is also on the works of artists Larry Rivers, Keith Haring, Kenny Scharf, and photographer Francesco Scavullo.

Smith simultaneously created his own artwork while spending evenings and weekends working at Warhol's Factory. Like his mentor, Smith became successful in his interpretations of Marilyn Monroe and Campbell's soup cans. He did silkscreen paintings of actress Greta Garbo and was working on a portfolio of notable female performers such as Cher and Liza Minnelli. In 1981, Smith had a one-man show at the North Miami Museum & Art Center. His work was also exhibited at the Gallery Sho in Tokyo, Gallerie Borjeson in Sweden, the Fred Dorfman Gallery in New York, and the Hokin galleries in Chicago, Miami, and Palm Beach. By 1982, Smith's work was selling from $500 to $5,000, and on occasion, he had fetched $25,000 and above for his Warhol collaborations. Musician John Lennon, singer Mick Jagger, and actress Julie Christie had Smith's work in their collections.

Smith was known for applying diamond dust to his paintings. "I have always liked the way the lines of a boat reflect in the water, the distortions. The figures are just a vehicle for reflections on water, and the diamond dust compliments the reflections. I put it on the highlights — the whitest, hottest, brightest spots," he said. This technique was inspired by the reflective ground optical glass on the State of Florida traffic warning signs. Smith stated that during his early experimentation, he had spent up to $10,000 on a 50-pound bag of premium diamond dust before realizing that industrial-grade dust, which costs $1,200 per bag, created the same illuminating effect.

Smith had an estate in New Hope, Pennsylvania, and an apartment in New York City.

== Illness and death ==
In September 1988, Smith was diagnosed with AIDS. In early February 1989, he attended a dinner for the opening of a Warhol retrospective at the Museum of Modern Art in New York City.

Smith died a week before his 38th birthday in Fort Lauderdale of complications from AIDS on February 15, 1989. He was survived by his parents, a brother, Mark Smith, and his companion, Daniel Polaski. Smith's parents asked for donations in his memory to be made to the University of Miami School of Medicine, Clinical Immunology Lab, or the AIDS Project for Health Crisis Network.
