= Kurt Benirschke =

American physician (1924–2018)

- Born: May 26, 1924; Glückstadt, Germany
- Died: September 10, 2018 (aged 94); San Diego, California, U.S.
- Citizenship: American
- Education: University of Hamburg
- Known for: Expert on the placenta and reproduction in humans and animals Created the research program at the San Diego Zoo; Created the Frozen Zoo
- Scientific career
- Fields: Pathology; Genetics; Conservation

Kurt Benirschke (May 26, 1924 – September 10, 2018) was a German-American pathologist, geneticist, and animal conservationist. He was expert on the placenta,reproduction in humans, and myriad mammalian species. In 1975, Benirschke founded the San Diego Zoo's Center for the Reproduction of Endangered Species, where he created the world's first frozen zoo for the cryopreservation of genetic material from endangered species.

== Early life and education ==
Benirschke grew up in Glückstadt, a small town in northern Germany. He received his M.D. degree from the University of Hamburg in 1948. He immigrated to the United States in 1949.

== Career ==
After an internship in New Jersey, he trained in pathology at university hospitals affiliated with Harvard Medical School in Boston. In 1955, he became pathologist of the Boston Lying-in Hospital, now part of the Brigham and Women's Hospital, and there developed his interest in the placenta and reproductive problems.

From 1960 to 1970 he was the chairman of the department of pathology at Dartmouth Medical School in Hanover, New Hampshire, and pursued his interests in placental pathology and comparative reproductive pathology. There, he developed a passion for comparative cytogenetics, discovering the reason for the sterility of mules and investigating twinning in armadillos and marmosets.

In 1970, Benirschke moved west to participate in the development of a new medical school of the University of California, San Diego (UCSD). He established a genetics laboratory and ran the autopsy service at UCSD. He also chaired the department of pathology for two years.

In 1975, Benirschke persuaded the Board of Trustees of the San Diego Zoo to establish a formal research department. Benirschke led this new research department, which was named the Center for the Reproduction of Endangered Species, until 1986 he became a member of the Zoo's Board of Trustees. He set up a laboratory at the Zoo to study the chromosomes of mammals, particularly aspects relating to reproduction and evolution. In collaboration with T.C. Hsu, he published an Atlas of Mammalian Chromosomes which presented the karyotypes of 400 different species of mammals.

He established at the Zoo a collection of frozen cells and reproductive material from dozens of highly endangered species that became famous as the first "Frozen Zoo." In the 1970s when he began this collection, there was no technology available to make use of it, but he quoted Daniel Boorstin: "You must collect things for reasons you don't yet understand." The Frozen Zoo eventually became a priceless genetic resource.

Throughout his career, he moved freely back and forth between human medicine and animal medicine. This inspired the title One Medicine given to a Festschrift written by 50 of his colleagues to honor his 60th birthday. In the introduction, O. A. Ryder and M. L. Byrd state, "The acknowledgment that the underlying mechanisms of cellular function and organismal development are highly similar among animals provides the impetus for the title of this volume, One Medicine. It is a tribute to Prof. Kurt Benirschke from his students and colleagues. As such, we attempt to recognize the breadth and depth of his thinking and to acknowledge the significant role he has played in aspects of human medicine, veterinary medicine, and wildlife conservation."

Benirschke collaborated with Pop artist Andy Warhol on the book Vanishing Animals, published by Springer-Verlag in 1986. Benirschke provided the text on endangered wildlife, while Warhol created color illustrations. The book received favorable reviews from critics for drawing attention to the plight of endangered species.

In 1994, he was elected a fellow of the American Academy of Arts and Sciences. The same year, he retired from the faculty at UCSD. From 1997-2000 he was president of the Zoo's Board of Trustees and looked after the "Proyecto Tagua" in Paraguay, a breeding facility of the newly discovered species of peccary. His text (with Peter Kaufmann) on Human Placental Pathology is the standard text on the subject. In 2008 he was one of the founders of the Center for Academic Research and Training in Anthropogeny (CARTA), an interdisciplinary research group based at UCSD and devoted to the study of human origins.

Benirschke was a member of many societies and authored 30 books and 510 scientific publications. He was described as a "visionary" and a "Renaissance physician".

== Personal life ==
He met his wife Marion, a nurse, during his internship. They were married for 66 years at the time of his death and had three children, two sons and a daughter. One son, Dr. Stephen Benirschke, lives in Seattle and is a foot and ankle orthopedic surgeon best known for his specialty with the calcaneus fracture surgery. His other son, Rolf Benirschke, is a retired placekicker for the San Diego Chargers of the National Football League. His daughter Ingrid Benirschke-Perkins is the community relations director for CARTA.
