= Ten Portraits of Jews of the Twentieth Century =

1980 series of paintings by Andy Warhol

- Artist: Andy Warhol
- Year: 1980
- Catalogue: F&S II.226–235
- Medium: Screenprints in colors on Lenox Museum Board
- Movement: Pop art
- Dimensions: 100 cm × 81 cm (40 in × 32 in)

Ten Portraits of Jews of the Twentieth Century is a 1980 series of silkscreen prints by American artist Andy Warhol. It features ten portraits of influential Jewish figures drawn from a broad range of disciplines, including politics, theatre, psychology, literature, music, and science. Among those depicted are Golda Meir, Sarah Bernhardt, Sigmund Freud, Franz Kafka, and the Marx Brothers. Following their initial exhibition, the paintings toured synagogues and Jewish cultural institutions throughout the United States.

== Background ==
[Pop artist Andy Warhol began working on the series in 1979, which was commissioned by art dealer Ronald Feldman. The subjects of the portraits were subsequently chosen by Feldman after consultation with the director of the art school of the Jewish Community Center of Greater Washington, Ruth Levine, and with the Center's gallery director, Susan Morgenstein. Feldman had originally been asked by an Israeli art dealer for a series of portraits of Golda Meir. Warhol nicknamed the series "Jewish geniuses".

Feldman researched and secured rights to the source photographs used in the series, including images of Franz Kafka, Gertrude Stein, and Albert Einstein. Photographer Trude Fleischmann provided Warhol with a signed portrait of Einstein free of charge.

== Description ==
The series consists of ten silkscreened canvases, each measuring 40 by 40 inches (100 cm × 100 cm). Five sets of the painted canvas series were produced. Warhol also created the images as a portfolio of 40 by 32 inch (102 × 81 cm) screenprints on Lenox Museum Board, issued in editions of 200.

== Portfolio ==
The portfolio is catalogued as Feldman & Schellmann II.226–235.

No.	Work	Catalogue raisonné
1	Franz Kafka	F&S II.226
2	Gertrude Stein	F&S II.227
3	Martin Buber	F&S II.228
4	Albert Einstein	F&S II.229
5	Louis Brandeis	F&S II.230
6	George Gershwin	F&S II.231
7	The Marx Brothers	F&S II.232
8	Golda Meir	F&S II.233
9	Sarah Bernhardt	F&S II.234
10	Sigmund Freud	F&S II.235

== Exhibitions ==
Ten Portraits of Jews of the Twentieth Century was first shown at the Jewish Community Center of Greater Washington in Rockville, Maryland in March 1980.

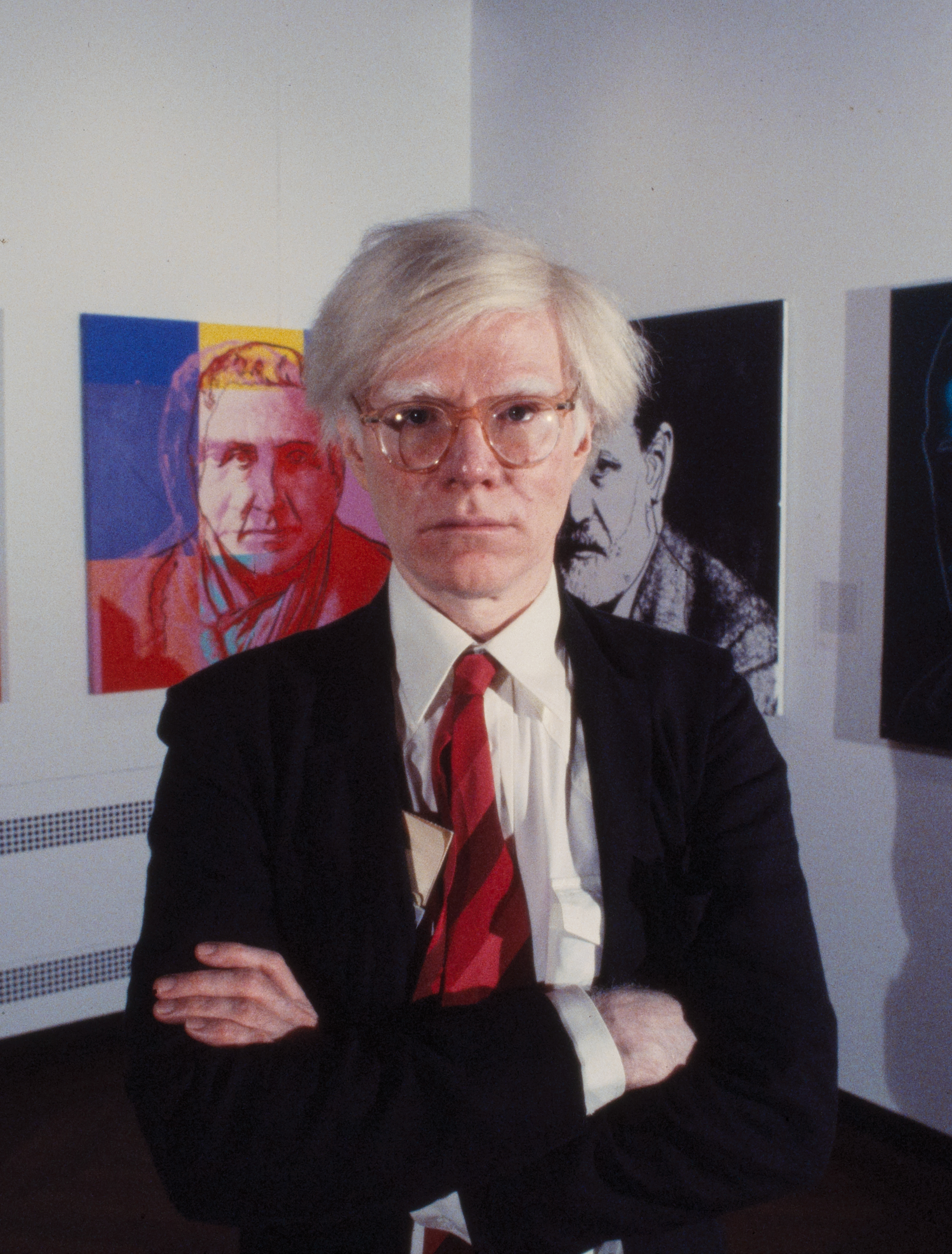
Warhol with portraits of Gertrude Stein and Sigmund Freud at the Jewish Museum in New York, 1980

In September 1980, a set was displayed at the Lowe Art Museum at the University of Miami in Coral Gables, Florida. That month, another set was mounted at the Linda Farris Gallery in Seattle, Washington. From September to November 1980, the series was included in a Warhol exhibit at the Portland Center for Visual Arts in Portland, Oregon. The series was also exhibited at the Jewish Museum of New York from September 1980 to January 1981.

In November 1980, the series was included in a celebration of Jews titled Variations on a Jewish Themes at the Hartford Jewish Community Center in Harford, Connecticut.

The series was displayed at the National Portrait Gallery in London between January and June 2006, and returned to New York's Jewish Museum in 2008 in an exhibition called Warhol's Jews: 10 Portraits Reconsidered. The series was exhibited at Waddesdon Manor in Buckinghamshire, England, in 2011.

From November 2024, to February 2025, a rare complete set of Warhol's preparatory collages for the series was exhibited in New York City at Lévy Gorvy Dayan in the exhibition Andy Warhol: Ten Portraits of Jews of the Twentieth Century.

== Critical reception ==
The exhibition had a distinctly varied and even quite harsh critical reception. The Philadelphia Inquirer called the series "Jewploitation" and a critic for The Village Voice wrote that the show was "hypocritical, cynical and exploitative."The New York Times review by Hilton Kramer stated that "the show is vulgar, it reeks of commercialism, and its contribution to art is nil" and that "the way it exploits its Jewish subjects without showing the slightest grasp of their significance is offensive – or would be, anyway, if the artist had not already treated so many non-Jewish subjects in the same tawdry manner".

Carrie Rickey reviewed the show more positively for Artforum, writing that "the paintings are staggering" and adding they had an "unexpected mix of cultural anthropology, portraiture, celebration of celebrity, and study of intelligentsia—all at the same time."

Roger Hurlburt of the Fort Lauderdale News praised Warhol's approach: "Warhol's highly graphic technique masterfully singles out those traits that emphasize a universal aspect for each personality. ... The image may be immediately recognizable, but Warhol forces us to evaluate the work while he remains distant."

Bernard Hanson of the Hartford Courant stated that the portraits were "handsome." He added that the show was "quite an experience. Warhol combines the photographic image, the elegantly simplified outline and the magic interplay of planes of color to produce a vision which is part document and part fantasy."

=== Subsequent assessments ===
In 2006, the National Portrait Gallery wrote that "Warhol's insistence that the subjects be deceased invests the series with an inescapable character of mortality. The faces of the dead appear as if behind a veneer of modernity. The tension sustained between photograph and abstraction focuses the issue of their celebrity. Probing the faultlines between the person and their manufactured, surface image, Warhol presents these individuals' fame as a complex metamorphosis."

In 2008, Ken Johnson of The New York Times wrote that "What is remarkable about the paintings now, however, is how uninteresting they are. What once made them controversial – the hint of a jokey, unconscious antisemitism – has evaporated, leaving little more than bland, posterlike representations. The paintings do have a certain visual panache; you could even call some of them jazzy. ... The issue for Warhol is not what his subjects did and not Jewishness in general. His real subject was fame. He was interested in famous people simply because they were famous."

== Collections ==
A set of screenprints was donated to New York's Jewish Museum by Lorraine and Martin Beitler in 2006.

Two complete sets of the series are located in Des Moines, Iowa. One is held by the Des Moines Art Center, while the other is displayed at Tifereth Israel Synagogue.
